= Communes of Buenos Aires =

Administrative divisions of Buenos Aires, Argentina

The comunas separately coloured, showing neighbourhood divisions

The city of Buenos Aires is administratively divided into fifteen comunas, unlike the Province of Buenos Aires, which is subdivided into partidos, or the rest of Argentina, in which the second-order administrative division is departamentos. Each comuna encompasses one or more neighbourhoods (barrios), which are represented in the respective community centres for administrative purposes.

The division by comunas was instituted by the 1996 Constitution of the City of Buenos Aires, and modified in 2005 by Law #1777. The law was again modified in 2008, 2011, and 2013.

== List of comunas ==
The comunas are serially numbered. They are listed below in numerical order together with their constituent neighbourhoods.

1. Comuna 1: Puerto Madero, San Nicolás, Retiro, Monserrat, San Telmo and Constitución
2. Comuna 2: Recoleta
3. Comuna 3: Balvanera and San Cristóbal
4. Comuna 4: La Boca, Barracas, Parque Patricios and Nueva Pompeya
5. Comuna 5: Almagro and Boedo
6. Comuna 6: Caballito
7. Comuna 7: Flores and Parque Chacabuco
8. Comuna 8: Villa Soldati, Villa Lugano and Villa Riachuelo
9. Comuna 9: Parque Avellaneda, Mataderos and Liniers
10. Comuna 10: Villa Luro, Vélez Sársfield, Floresta, Monte Castro, Villa Real and Versalles
11. Comuna 11: Villa Devoto, Villa del Parque, Villa Santa Rita and Villa General Mitre
12. Comuna 12: Villa Pueyrredón, Villa Urquiza, Coghlan and Saavedra
13. Comuna 13: Núñez, Belgrano and Colegiales
14. Comuna 14: Palermo
15. Comuna 15: Villa Ortúzar, Chacarita, Villa Crespo, La Paternal, Agronomía and Parque Chas

Nr.Plates	Districts of Buenos Aires	Population (Census 2022)	Area (km²)	Density (/km²)
2007	Comuna 1	223,554	17.9	12,489
2014	Comuna 2	161,645	6.3	25,658
2021	Comuna 3	196,240	6.4	30,663
2028	Comuna 4	229,240	22.7	10,099
2035	Comuna 5	194,271	6.7	28,996
2042	Comuna 6	203,043	6.9	29,427
2049	Comuna 7	215,896	12.4	17,411
2056	Comuna 8	204,367	22.5	9,083
2063	Comuna 9	169,063	16.6	10,185
2070	Comuna 10	173,004	12.6	13,731
2077	Comuna 11	204,601	14.1	14,511
2084	Comuna 12	236,887	15.7	15,088
2091	Comuna 13	264,385	15.0	17,626
2098	Comuna 14	248,635	15.9	15,637
2105	Comuna 15	196,876	14.3	13,768
Total		3,121,707	205.9	15,161

== See also ==
- Departments of Argentina – second-level administrative divisions in other parts of Argentina.
