= Arroyo Vega =

Location
- Country: Argentina
- City: Buenos Aires

Physical characteristics
- Length: 10.8 km (6.7 mi)
- Basin size: 17.1 km^{2} (6.6 sq mi)

Arroyo Vega is a stream of the city of Buenos Aires, Argentina, which originates in the current neighborhoods of Agronomía and La Paternal and continues its course through the neighborhoods of Colegiales and Belgrano to flow into the Río de la Plata at the height of Ciudad Universitaria. Its basin has an area of 1700 hectares and is located entirely within the limits of the city.
