= La Paternal, Buenos Aires =

Coordinates: 34°36′S 58°28′W

La Paternal
- Neighborhood of Buenos Aires
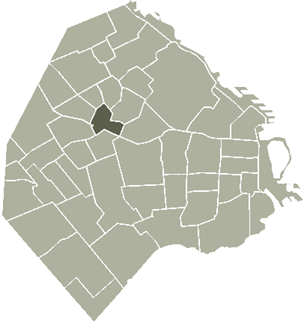
- Location of La Paternal within Buenos Aires
- Country: Argentina
- Autonomous City: Buenos Aires
- Comuna: C15

Area
  - Total: 2.4 km^{2} (0.93 sq mi)

Population (2001 census [INDEC])
  - Total: 20,053
  - Density: 8,400/km^{2} (22,000/sq mi)
- Time zone: UTC-3 (ART)

La Paternal or Paternal (English: The Paternal) is a neighborhood or district in the centre of Buenos Aires city, Argentina. It was founded in 1904 by a city decree (decreto) and was named 'La Paternal' after the train station in the neighbourhood, a former industrial zone.

La Paternal neighbours the following barrios: Agronomía, Chacarita, Villa Crespo, Villa General Mitre, Villa Santa Rita and Caballito.

Primarily a residential quarter, it has mostly condos and single-family homes, and a shopping district on its main venue, Avenida San Martín.

The barrio is traditionally associated with Argentinos Juniors football team, whose social headquarters is at the northern part of the neighbourhood.
