= Julia Zenko =

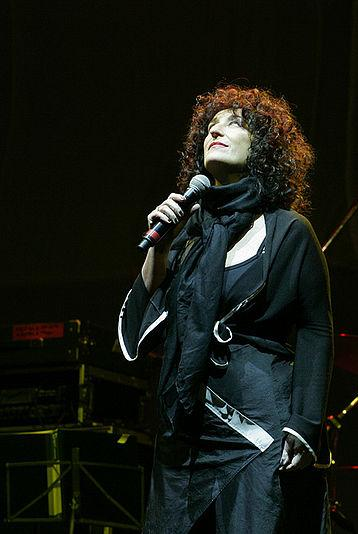

Background information
- Born: Julia Trzenko; 30 October 1958 (age 67); La Paternal, Buenos Aires, Argentina
- Genres: Latin ballad; Latin pop; Tango
- Occupations: Singer; actress
- Instrument: Vocals

Julia Trzenko (born 30 October 1958) better known as Julia Zenko, is an Argentine singer and actress.

== Biography ==
Zenko was born in the La Paternal neighborhood, and she lived there until she was six years old with her parents and brother. She then moved with her family to Villa Devoto. She lives in Coghlan. She is the daughter and granddaughter of Polish and Latvian Jewish immigrants. Her paternal grandfather was a fan and singer in the temples. In elementary school, she was part of the choir and he always remembers her music teacher named Clarita. She played the guitar; she never liked sports. She took theater courses with Edgardo Moreira.

In 1977, Zenko began to sing in clubs and pubs. She sang in the groups Trío Sol y sus Amigos, Scat Singer and Amalgama, where she was the vocalist, along with Pedro Aznar on bass, Eddie Sierra on guitar and Ricardo "Topo" Carbone on drums; she did covers and different genres, such as ballads, boleros, songs in Portuguese. She began to record commercial jingles, also under the tutelage of Parentella. She was recognized for the personality of her particular voice, in jingles for companies such as Aerolíneas Argentinas, Palette bedspreads or Express cookies.

Zenko took theater courses with Alezzo, Luis Agustoni and Augusto Fernandes. In 1983, she edited his first LP, Vital, and where he sang "Carta de un león a otro". She has recorded folklore, ballads, songs with social commitment. She sang in Argentine films such as Los pasajeros del jardín, with Graciela Borges, Señora de nadie with Luisina Brando and No toquen a la nena (with Andrea del Boca). She put her voice on curtains of famous telenovelas such as María de Nadie (with Grecia Colmenares), Dulce Ana (with Patricia Palmer) and Soy Gina (with Luisa Kuliok).

Zenko has two daughters.

== Awards ==
Zenko has won the following awards:

- ACE Award
- Presser Award
- Festibuga award
- Konex Award (1995, 2005 and 2015) as Female Pop and Ballad Soloist.
- Gardel Award Best Pop Female Artist Album (2018)

== Discography ==
- 1983: Vital - PHILIPS
- 1985: Travesía del alma - PHILIPS
- 1986: Cambios - PHILIPS
- 1987: Crecer con todo - PHILIPS
- 1988: Requetepillos - PHILIPS
- 1989: El remedio es cantar - PHILIPS
- 1991: En tiempo real - SONY MUSIC
- 1991: Vital '91 - POLYGRAM
- 1992: Así va la vida - COLUMBIA
- 1995: Sin rótulos - SONY
- 1998: María de Buenos Aires TELDEC
- 1998: Julia de Buenos Aires - EPSA MUSIC
- 2001: Tango por vos - EPSA MUSIC
- 2002: Orestes
- 2004: El Show de las Divorciadas
- 2006: Vida mía - SONY
- 2009: Canta a MARÍA ELENA WALSH - LUCIO ALFIZ PRODUCCIONES S.R.L.
- 2009: P'ra Elis - CALLE ANGOSTA DISCOS
- 2013: Mi libertad - LUCIO ALFIZ PRODUCCIONES S.R.L.
- 2017: Nosotras - CICLO 3
- 2019: "Vuelvo a ser luz" - WARNER MUSIC

Compilations

- 1995: Lo nuestro - POLYGRAM
- 1997: Siempre pienso en ti - POLYGRAM
- 1997: 20 Grandes éxitos - SONY MUSIC ENTERTAINMENT ARGENTINA S.A.
- 2000: Mis 30 mejores canciones - SONY
- 2003: Los esenciales - SONY
- 2004: De colección - SONY
- 2009: Los elegidos - SONY
- 2020: Vuelvo a ser luz - WARNER MUSIC

== Filmography ==
=== As an actress ===
- 1986: Mesa de noticias
- 1992: Gran Hotel Casino
- 1993: ¡Dale Loly!
- 2017: Mujeres perfectas (obra de teatro).
- 2018: Hermanos de Sangre- El Musical

=== As a singer ===
- 1982: Pubis angelical
- 1989: Los espíritus patrióticos
- 1992: Soy Gina
- 1995: Dulce Ana
