= Postal codes in Argentina =

Postal codes in Argentina are called códigos postales. Argentina first implemented a four-digit postal code system in 1958, aiming to improve mail distribution efficiency. However, it wasn't until 1998 that the more detailed and comprehensive Código Postal Argentino (CPA) system was launched, significantly enhancing both accuracy and efficiency in mail delivery. Until 1998 Argentina employed a four-digit postal code for each municipality, with the first digit representing a region in the country, except in the case of the city of Buenos Aires (which had different postal codes starting in 1000 and with the other numbers varying according to the zone). The unique codes became the base for the newer system, officially called CPA (Código Postal Argentino, Argentine Postal Code).

== Usage ==
The CPA is not mandatory for private use, but companies that do mass mailings benefit from a discount if they use the CPA. Despite this, the CPA is still not in wide use by private persons, and even government sources and private businesses often list only the base code (the old system). In order to ease the adoption of the new postal code, the former state mail company (Correo Argentino) provides a look-up feature on its website. The CPA is intended to improve the quality and speed of mail delivery, but mail without a well-formed CPA will be delivered correctly as well.

== Structure ==
The CPA consists of three parts:

- A single letter (ISO 3166-2:AR) that references the province (for example, C for Capital Federal, Q for Neuquén).
- Four digits (the old postal code or a variation of it on the last digits) showing the town or city.
- Three letters, identifying a side of the city block where the address is located.

=== Position 1 ===
The first letter in the CPA, which identifies the province, has its origins in the old Argentine license plates system, which gave each province a letter, usually its initial. Since several provinces share the same initial, a few odd assignments are found (such as X for Córdoba, A for Salta, and N for Misiones). See ISO 3166-2:AR for a complete list.

=== Position 2 to 5 ===
The four digits could be grouped as the following:

- 1XXX = Buenos Aires City, Buenos Aires Province North (e.g., C1420 Buenos Aires City, B1900 La Plata).
- 2XXX = Santa Fe (e.g., S2000 Rosario, S2300 Rafaela).
- 3XXX = Santa Fe, Entre Ríos, Chaco, Corrientes, Formosa, Misiones (e.g., E3100 Paraná, P3600 Formosa, N3300 Posadas, W3400 Corrientes).
- 4XXX = Jujuy, Salta, Tucumán, Catamarca, Santiago del Estero (e.g., T4000 San Miguel de Tucumán, A4400 Salta, K4700 San Fernando del Valle de Catamarca).
- 5XXX = Córdoba, La Rioja, San Juan, San Luis, Mendoza (e.g., X5000 Córdoba, M5500 Mendoza, D5700 San Luis, F5300 La Rioja).
- 6XXX = Buenos Aires Province West, La Pampa (e.g., B6000 Junín, L6300 Santa Rosa, L6700 Luján).
- 7XXX = Buenos Aires Province East, Center and South (e.g., B7000 Tandil, B7600 Mar del Plata, B7400 Olavarría).
- 8XXX = Buenos Aires Province South, Río Negro, Neuquén (e.g., B8000 Bahía Blanca, R8400 Bariloche, R8500 Viedma, Q8300 Neuquén).
- 9XXX = Chubut, Santa Cruz and Tierra del Fuego (e.g., U9000 Comodoro Rivadavia, U9200 Esquel, V9410 Ushuaia, Z9400 Río Gallegos).

=== Position 6 to 8 ===
A combination of three letters that identifies a side of a city block.
