= Vehicle registration plates of Uruguay =

2016 Mercosur Uruguayan license plates

Uruguay requires its residents to register their motor vehicles and display vehicle registration plates.

== History ==
Until the early 2000s, the codes, designs, sizes, and colors of vehicle license plates varied in each department. In 2001, by agreement of the National Congress of Mayors, it was decided to implement the new alphanumeric system (3 letters and 4 numbers) for the entire country. During that year and at the beginning of 2002, the new system was adopted in Montevideo, that spread throughout all the departments of the country, except Maldonado and Salto. In March 2015, the Single Patent of Mercosur began to be implemented, which has been mandatory since 2016.

Maldonado was the only department that did not adopt the new alphanumeric license plate system for automobiles during the first decade of the 2000s (like the rest of the departments), except for motorcycles and some special license plates (such as those of ediles, intendencia, officials, tourism, professional freight transport, taxis and remises). Finally, on January 4, 2019, the department began to implement the Mercosur license plates, with the particularity of indicating each municipality by a badge added below the patent plate (in addition to the second letter of the series).

In the case of Salto, an alphanumeric system of 3 letters and 3 numbers was adopted, with the shield of the department larger than other departments in the center of the license plate. In 2015, the Mercosur patent was implemented with 3 letters and 4 numbers starting from HAA 1000.

== Departmental coding ==
Plates issued in each department begin with a one-letter code. These codes, used on the unique local issues of the past, have carried over to the current national series as part of the standard nationwide format.

Department or lia	Code
Artigas Department	G
Canelones Department	A
Cerro Largo Department	E
Colonia Department	L
Durazno Department	Q
Flores Department	N
Florida Department	O
Lavalleja Department	P
Maldonado Department	B
Montevideo Department	S
Paysandú Department	I
Río Negro Department	J
Rivera Department	F
Rocha Department	C
Salto Department	H
San José Department	M
Soriano Department	K
Tacuarembó Department	R
Treinta y Tres Department	D

== Old series ==
Prior to the introduction of this series, plates issued in each department had a unique design, in many instances displaying only the name of the municipality, rather than that of the department or the country. The change echoes that made in Argentina in 1994 with the change to a national plate series displaying the nation's name rather than a more local designation.

Under the current plate series, a single serial number format of ABC 1234 (and ABC 123 for motorcycles) has been introduced for the entire country, with either the country name, the vehicle type, or both displayed on the plate. Now absent are department or municipality designations, except for the small official logos displayed on many plates, one between the letters and numbers indicating the department of registration and another in the lower right corner indicating the municipality of registration. Plates in the current series employ FE-Schrift for their serials.

Some older plates are still in use, but evidently they are being replaced with plates of the current series, as even many antique cars have plates from the current series.

Italicized letters indicate a departmental code; bold letters indicate a fixed type code that appears on all plates of a particular type:

Image	Type		Legend	Serial format	Design
Image	English	Spanish	Legend	Serial format	Design
	Passenger	Particular	URUGUAY	ABC 1234	black on white
	Motorcycle	Motocicleta	URUGUAY	ABC; 123	black on white
	Official	Oficial	OFICIAL—URUGUAY	SOF 1234	blue on white
	Ambulance	Ambulancia	URUGUAY	AAM 1234	green on white; embossed cross in lower left corner
	Doctor	Médico	URUGUAY	AME 1234	green on white; embossed cross in lower left corner
	Departmental Assembly	Edil Junta Departamental	EDIL JUNTA DEPARTAMENTAL	AED 1234	white on light blue; screened type designation
	President of Departmental Assembly	Presidente de la Junta Departamental	PRESIDENTE J. DEPARTAMENTAL	APE 1	white on light blue; screened type designation
	Diplomatic	Diplomático	URUGUAY	SCD 1234	black on white
	Diplomatic—Motorcycle	Diplomático—Motocicleta	URUGUAY	SCD; 123	black on white
	Diplomatic—Consular Corps	Diplomático—Cuerpo Consular	URUGUAY	SCC 1234	black on white
	Diplomatic—Consular Corps—Motorcycle	Diplomático—Cuerpo Consular—Motocicleta	URUGUAY	SCC; 123	black on white
	Government	Gobierno	URUGUAY	SAB 1234	black on white
	Government—unknown type	?	URUGUAY	SAB 1234	white on orange
	International organization	Organización internacional	URUGUAY	SOI 1234	black on white
	National Representative	Representante Nacional	REPRESENTANTE NACIONAL	ARN 1234	blue on white
	Non-governmental organization	Organización no gubernamental	URUGUAY	SNG 1234	black on white
	Livery	Remise	REMISE	ARE 1234	black on yellow
	Taxi		TAXI	ATX 1234	black on yellow
	Public transportation	Transporte colectivo	URUGUAY	ATC 1234	black on yellow
	School	Escolar	ESCOLAR	AES 1234	black on yellow
	Tourist van	Turismo	TURISMO—URUGUAY	AMT 1234	black on yellow
	Tourist bus	Turismo	TURISMO—URUGUAY	ATU 1234	white on blue
	Truck	Carga	CARGA URUGUAY	ATP 1234	black on white
	Rental motorcycle	Motocicleta—Alquiler	URUGUAY	AAL; 123	black on yellow
	Rental vehicle	Alquiler	ALQUILER—URUGUAY	AAL 1234	black on white

== Previous series ==
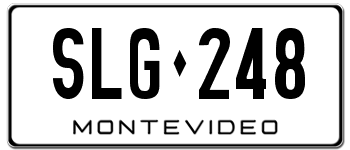
Montevideo pre-1996 license plate

While also issued by department with the same codes, these plates employ varying designs, with unique plate sizes and shapes, dies, and color schemes and may identify the municipality of registration rather than the department itself. Many plates featured a white and blue color scheme.

Italicized letters indicate a departmental code; bold letters indicate a fixed type code that appears on all plates of a particular type:

Image	Location and/or type	Serial format	Design	Legend(s)
	Diplomatic	CC 123?	white on blue	?
	National Navy	123	black on white; embossed anchor at center	"ARMADA"
	Public safety/government	MI 12-345; MI 123456	black on white or blue on white; variety of manufacturing styles	none
	Artigas Department	GA-1234	blue on white	"ARTIGAS"; "ROU" debossed in embossed box at left
	Canelones Department	ABC 123		
	Caneloles Department—Official	A 1234	white on blue	"OFICIAL URUGUAY"
	Cerro Largo Department—Melo city	EM-12345	black on white	"CERRO LARGO" embossed at top; "ROU" embossed vertically at left; "MELO" embossed vertically at right; the small M below the hyphen also indicates the city
	Colonia Department	LA-1234	blue on white	"COLONIA" debossed within embossed square that contains the "L"; "URUGUAY" at top. Some plates have a full-color seal, while others do not.
	Durazno Department	QAB-123	dark blue on gold	"DURAZNO - ROU" at bottom
	Maldonado Department—Maldonado	B 112-345	black on white	"Maldonado" at bottom; first number signifies city
	Maldonado Department—Piriápolis	B 712-345	black on white	"PIRIAPOLIS" at bottom; first number signifies city
	Maldonado Department—Punta del Este city	B 51-234; B 512-345	black on white	"PUNTA DEL ESTE" at bottom; first number signifies city
	Maldonado Department—San Carlos city	B 212-345	black on white	"SAN CARLOS" at bottom; first number signifies city
	Maldonado Department—Solís	B 812-345	black on white	"SOLIS" at bottom; first number signifies city
	Río Negro Department—Fray Bentos city	JAB 123	black on white	"FRAY BENTOS" at top, "RIO NEGRO" in orange band at bottom
	Rivera Department	FAB-123	dark blue on whute	"RIVERA - URUGUAY" at bottom
	Salto Department	HA 123	black on white; Salto logo at left	"SALTO" at bottom
	Soriano Department	K 12-3456	blue on white	"SORIANO URUGUAY" at bottom

=== Special plates ===
Certain vehicles dedicated to different functions (that is, those that are not private in most cases) have special combinations of letters and colors on the plates that do not have those of ordinary vehicles. These combinations are located (with exceptions) in the last two letters of the series. Almost all special license plates have the legend "Uruguay" and some have another legend added, depending on the vehicle's condition.

Private vehicles: black characters and borders

- DI: for people with disabilities. They also feature the wheelchair badge.
- ME: for doctors. It also features a green cross as an additional badge.

Diplomatic Corps: gilt characters and borders

- CC: for consular body.
- DC: for diplomatic corps.
- IO: for International Organizations.

Government vehicles: blue characters and borders

- OF: for official vehicles.
- ED: for ediles.
- ID: for vehicles of the Departmental Administration.
- JD: for vehicles of the Departmental Board.
- PL: for vehicles of the Legislative Power.
- PE: for vehicles of the Executive Power.
- PJ: for vehicles of the Judicial Power.
- MD: for vehicles of the Ministry of Defense.
- MI: for vehicles of the Ministry of the Interior.

Commercial transport vehicles: red characters and borders

- AL or LQ: rental vehicles.
- TP: heavy transport.
- RE: Remises.

Transfer and temporary vehicles: green characters and borders

- EN: school vehicles.
- TX: taxis.
- AM: ambulances.
- TU: tourism vehicles.
- TC: collective transport.
- IT: intercity transport.
- AT: temporary admission vehicles.
- PR: test vehicles.
- DP: sports cars.

=== Nomenclatures used before the Mercosur Single Patent ===
The following initials of special license plates were used to register vehicles in a specific department of the 19 that make up the Eastern Republic of Uruguay, these denominations follow the letter that identifies the department, for example B is Maldonado or S is Montevideo, a license plate would be composed as BCC (Consular Corps) or SCD (Diplomatic Corps):

- DU (Demonstration Used; yellow characters and border with red background; with caption "Demos. Used")
- AT (Temporary Admission); characters and green border with white background.
- CC (Consular Corps); characters and black border with white background.
- CD (Diplomatic Corps); characters and red border with white background.
- IO (International Organizations); characters and black border with white background.
- NG (Non-Governmental Organizations); characters and black border with white background.
- PR (Test; characters and black border with red background, or letters, numbers and white border and red background, or letters, numbers and red border and orange background; with the legend "Test")
- PR (Provisory; white characters and border with red background; with the legend "Provisory")
- PE (Permission; characters and red border with white background)
- AL (Vehicles for rent; characters and black border on a white background, or characters and black border on a yellow background, or characters and black border on an orange background, or characters and white border on an orange background; with the legend "Uruguay" on the most departments, only in Salto and Colonia the legend "Rent" is added)
- DA (Vehicles for rent; white characters and border with red background; with the legend "Rental")
- HA (Vehicles for Hire; characters and black border with red background, or characters and black border with orange background; with the legend "Rental")
- DP (Deportivo; black characters and border with a white background; with the legend "Deportivo"; this license plate is used in some departments to identify competition cars, such as rally cars, that enter the temporary admission regime).
- EX (Exempt; black characters and border with white background, or red characters and border with yellow background; also applies to motorcycles)
- DI (Disabled; characters and black border with white background, or characters and black border with orange background; with the wheelchair badge (this symbol is not added in Canelones))
- AM (Ambulances; characters and green border with white background)
- ME (Physician; characters and green border with white background; with green cross mark)
- TX (Taxis; characters and black border with yellow background; only with the legend "Taxi", except in border departments where the legend "Uruguay" is added)
- RE (Remises; characters and white border on green background, or characters and black border on green background, or characters and black border on yellow background, or characters and blue border on white background; only with legend "remit")
- RA (Remises; characters and red border with green background; with the legend "Remise")
- TU (Tourist vehicle; characters and white border on light blue background, or characters and blue border on white background, or characters and yellow border on light blue background, or characters and red border on yellow background; with the legend "Tourism" )
- MT (Tourist vehicle; characters and black border with yellow background; with the legend "Turismo")
- ES (Transportation of Schools; characters and yellow border with green background, or characters and red border with white background, or characters and white border with red background, or characters and black border with yellow background; only with the legend "Escolar", in Canelones the legend is only "Uruguay")
- TD (Transportation of Scholars disabled; characters and red border with blue background)
- TC (Transportation Collective; characters and yellow border with light blue background, or characters and black border with white background, or characters and blue border with white background, or characters and black border with yellow background, or characters and black border with orange background. In Flores the legend "Omnibus" is added to the left of "Uruguay")
- IT (Interurban Transport; characters and red border with blue background, or characters and black border with white background)
- TP (Transporte cargo professional; characters and white border with red background, or characters and black border with white background; with the legend "Cargo", in Río Negro and Colonia the legend is only "Uruguay")
- TM (Medium Transport; black characters and border with white background)
- TA (Transport with docked; characters and black border with white background)
- TR (Transportation with trailer; characters and black border on white background, or characters and black border on green background, or characters and white border on green background)
- TZ (Transport with trailer; characters and black border with white background)
- MZ (Transport with trailer; characters and white border with red background)
- ZZ (Vehicles with trailer; characters and black border with white background)
- MA (Machinery; characters and black border with white background. Does not apply to Cerro Largo, Soriano, Colonia and Lavalleja (their series with "MA" are private vehicles))
- MV (Road Machinery; characters and black border with red background)
- RO (Motorhome; characters and black border with white background)
- IM (Municipal Government, characters and red border with white background, or characters and blue border with white background, or characters and white border with light blue background, or characters and white border with red background. In Paysandú and Colonia the legend "Official" is added. Treinta y Tres, Artigas, Soriano and Lavalleja do not use these special license plates for vehicles of their respective I.M., instead they are registered as Officials (OF); if these license plates have a number they belong to Mayors, in this case the possible legends can only be "Montevideo" for SIM plates and "Uruguay" in other cases)
- JD (Junta Departamental; characters and blue border with white background, or characters and white border with dark red background; only with the legend "J. Departamental". It presents from 1 to three numbers and the departmental icons according to the Intendancy (generally the departmental coat of arms in the center))
- ED (Departmental Councilman; characters and blue border with a white background; with the legend "Councilman". Presents only 2 numbers and to the right the Government period)
- ED (Departmental Councilman; characters and red border with white background, or characters and blue border with white background, or characters and white border with red background; with the legend "Councilman" or "Official ")
- CM (Municipal Councilor; characters and blue border with white background; with the legend "Municipal Councilor")
- DI (Deputy; characters and blue border with white background)
- RN (National Representative; characters and blue border with white background, or characters and white border with red background)
- PL (Legislative Branch; characters and blue border with white background)
- PE (Presidency; characters and blue border with white background; with the legend "Presidency". Presents only 2 numbers and in the center the Uruguayan shield)
- PE (Executive Power; characters and blue border with a white background or characters and white border with a light blue background; the legend can only be one of the following: "Uruguay", "Presidency" or "President J. Departmental". Presents at least one number and the departmental icons)
- PJ (Judicial Power; characters and blue border with white background, or characters and red border with white background, or characters and black border with white background; with the legend "Judicial")
- OF (Official; characters and blue border with white background, or characters and white border with light blue background, or characters and red border with white background; with the legend "Official". It can have 1, 3 (for any Salto vehicle) or 4 numbers, also applies to motorcycles)
- MI (Ministry of the Interior; characters and blue border with white background. Presents only 2 letters and one more number in the series; with the legend "Official")
- MP (Public Ministry; characters and blue border with white background; with the legend "Fiscal" (which does not have a bevel like "Uruguay"). It is not used on motorcycles)

==== Used in only one department ====
The following special license plates are exclusive to a department and are fixed series, therefore none of the three letters varies as vehicles with these license plates can only be registered in those departments:

Canelones

- AIC (Intendance of Canelones, characters and red border with a white background; only with the legend "Uruguay". It also applies to motorcycles.)

Maldonado

- BCC (Consular Corps; Intendancy of Maldonado, characters and blue border with white background; only with the legend "Maldonado". High priority official. only for General Consuls with Jurisdiction throughout the territory of the Oriental Republic of Uruguay)

Rocha

- CCM (Trucks of merchandise; characters and black border with white background. Applies only in Rocha as CTP (Professional Freight Transport) is not used)
- CCZ (Transport with trailer; black characters and border with white background)

Artigas

- GAM, GBM (Doctor; characters and green border with white background; with the green cross symbol. The second letter indicates the town of Artigas)
- GAO, GBO (Omnibus Interdepartmental; black characters and border with yellow background; only with the legend "Uruguay". The second letter indicates the town of Artigas)
- GAR, GBR (Remises; characters and black border with yellow background; with the legend "Remise - Uruguay". It is used only in Artigas and the second letter indicates the locality)
- GAT, GBT (Taxis; characters and black border with yellow background; with the legend "Taxi", the second letter indicates the town of Artigas)
- GAE (School Transportation; black characters and border with yellow background; with the legend "School". Used only in Artigas)
- GTC (Cargo transport; black characters and border with white background. Used only in Artigas, sometimes the legend "Cargo" is added)

Salto

- HOM (Omnibus Interdepartmental; characters and red border with blue background)

Montevideo

- SAT (Temporary Admission; white characters and border with orange background. Not used on motorcycles)
- SCC (Consular Corps; characters and black border with white background)
- SCD (Diplomatic Corps; characters and black border with white background)
- SMI (Ministry of the Interior, characters and blue border with a white background; with the legend "Official". Same for the whole country. Also applies to motorcycles (3 numbers))
- SMP (Ministry of the Interior; used for motorcycles (presents 3 numbers), characters and blue border with white background. Same for the whole country)
- SJP (Police Headquarters; used for motorcycles (presents 3 numbers), characters and blue border with white background. Same for the whole country)

==== Uruguayan Armed Forces ====
These license plates do not use the icons that would normally correspond to an Intendancy, but an emblem always shown at the center belonging to one of the three branches of the Armed Forces of Uruguay, the series of these license plates are the same throughout the country.

- ENA (National Army - Administrative; characters and black border with white background.)
- ENT (National Army - Tactical; characters and black border with white background.)
- E (National Army; used for motorcycles (presents 3 numbers), with characters and black border with white background.)
- FAU (Uruguayan Air Force; characters and black border with white background.)
- ARN (Armada Nacional; characters and black border with white background.)

Maldonado

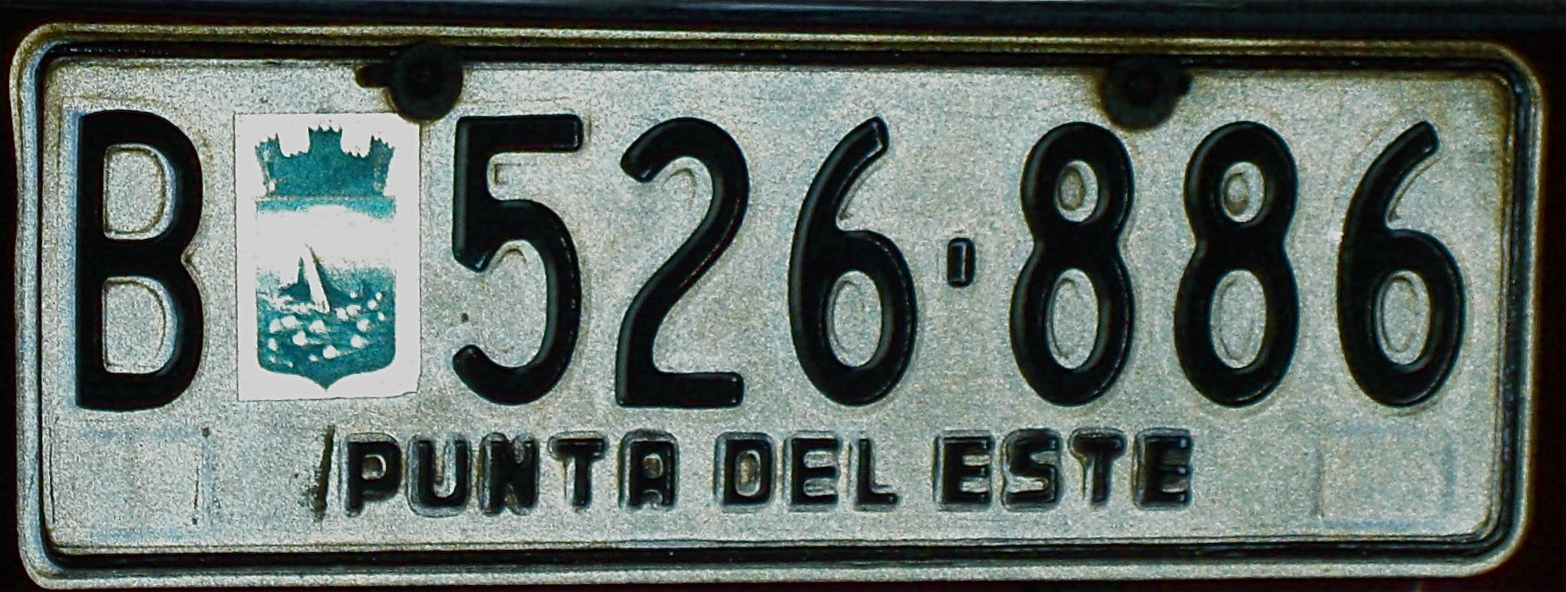
Registration of Punta del Este

Since 1992, this department had the format B 123·456. The letter B corresponds to the department; to its right is placed the departmental coat of arms and then a code of 3 to 6 numbers, which, together with the colors of the plate/plate, indicate the function of the wheel. In addition, the first number indicates in which locality a vehicle is registered, and this is reflected in the legend shown below in capital letters and without accents.

== 2016 Mercosur standard ==
Mercosur Uruguayan license plate

In October 2014 the design of the new license plate to be used by all Mercosur countries was officially presented. This consists of a plate of 15.75 in × 5.12 in (400.05 mm × 130.05 mm), with a white background, the characters and frame in black and a blue band at the top that shows the name of the country, its flag and the Mercosur logo. The typeface used is FE-Schrift.

== 2016 Mercosur standard for Maldonado department ==
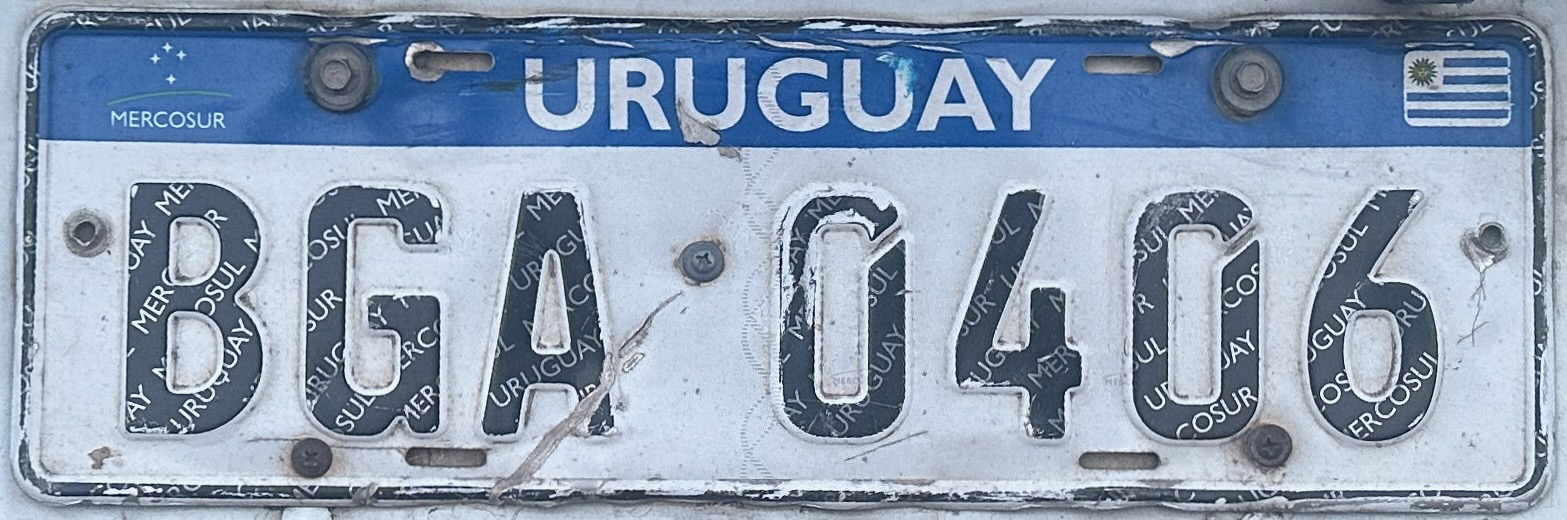
A vehicle registration plate of Piriápolis, Maldonado, issued after 2019

Unlike most departments that began issuing Mercosur license plates in 2015, the department of Maldonado did only on 4 january 2019. Authorities of this department wanted to preserve the historical particularity of having a specific code for each city. As for old registration plates, those issued after 2019 start with the letter B, followed by an identification letter for each city, whose name may be indicated by a blue band at bottom.

- BA : Maldonado
- BB : San Carlos
- BC : Pan de Azúcar
- BD : Aiguá
- BE : Punta Del Este
- BF : Garzón
- BG : Piriápolis
- BH : Solís
