= Villa Pueyrredón =

Coordinates: 34°35′S 58°30′W

Villa Pueyrredon
- Neighborhood of Buenos Aires
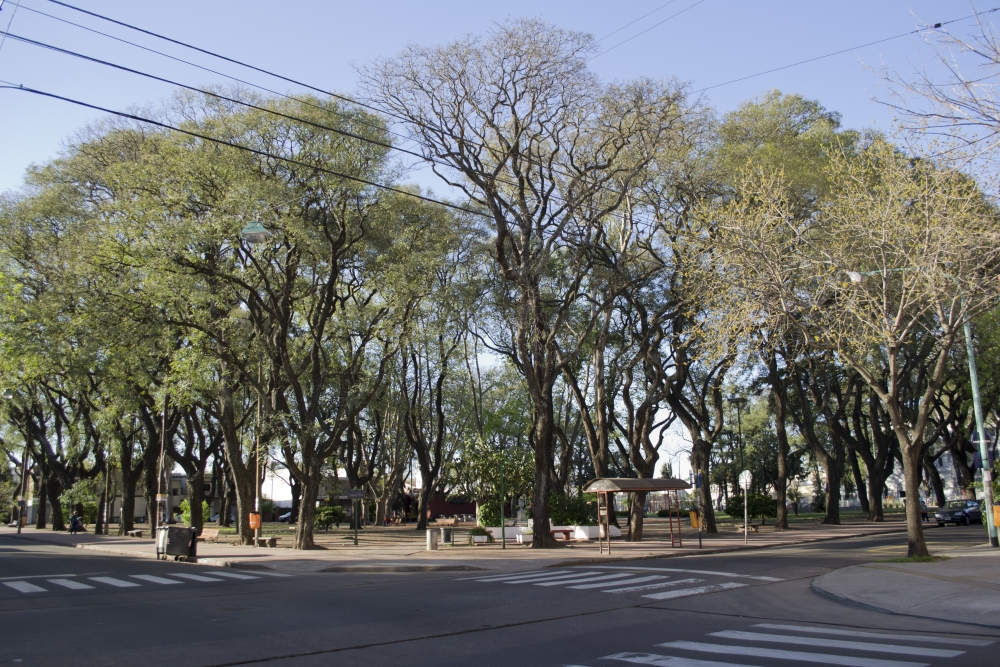
- Alem Square

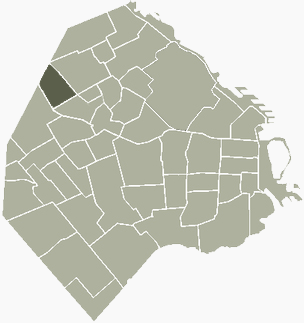
- Location of Villa Pueyrredon within Buenos Aires
- Country: Argentina
- Autonomous City: Buenos Aires
- Comuna: C12

Area
  - Total: 3.7 km^{2} (1.4 sq mi)

Population (2001)
  - Total: 40,325
  - Density: 11,000/km^{2} (28,000/sq mi)
- Time zone: UTC-3 (ART)

Villa Pueyrredón is a neighbourhood of Buenos Aires, the capital of Argentina. It is located between the neighborhoods of Villa Urquiza, Villa Devoto, and Agronomía. It is a middle class residential neighborhood with streets in draught-board, and surrounded by many squares and parks. The General Mitre Railway links Villa Pueyrredon with Retiro railway station in Buenos Aires CBD.

== History ==
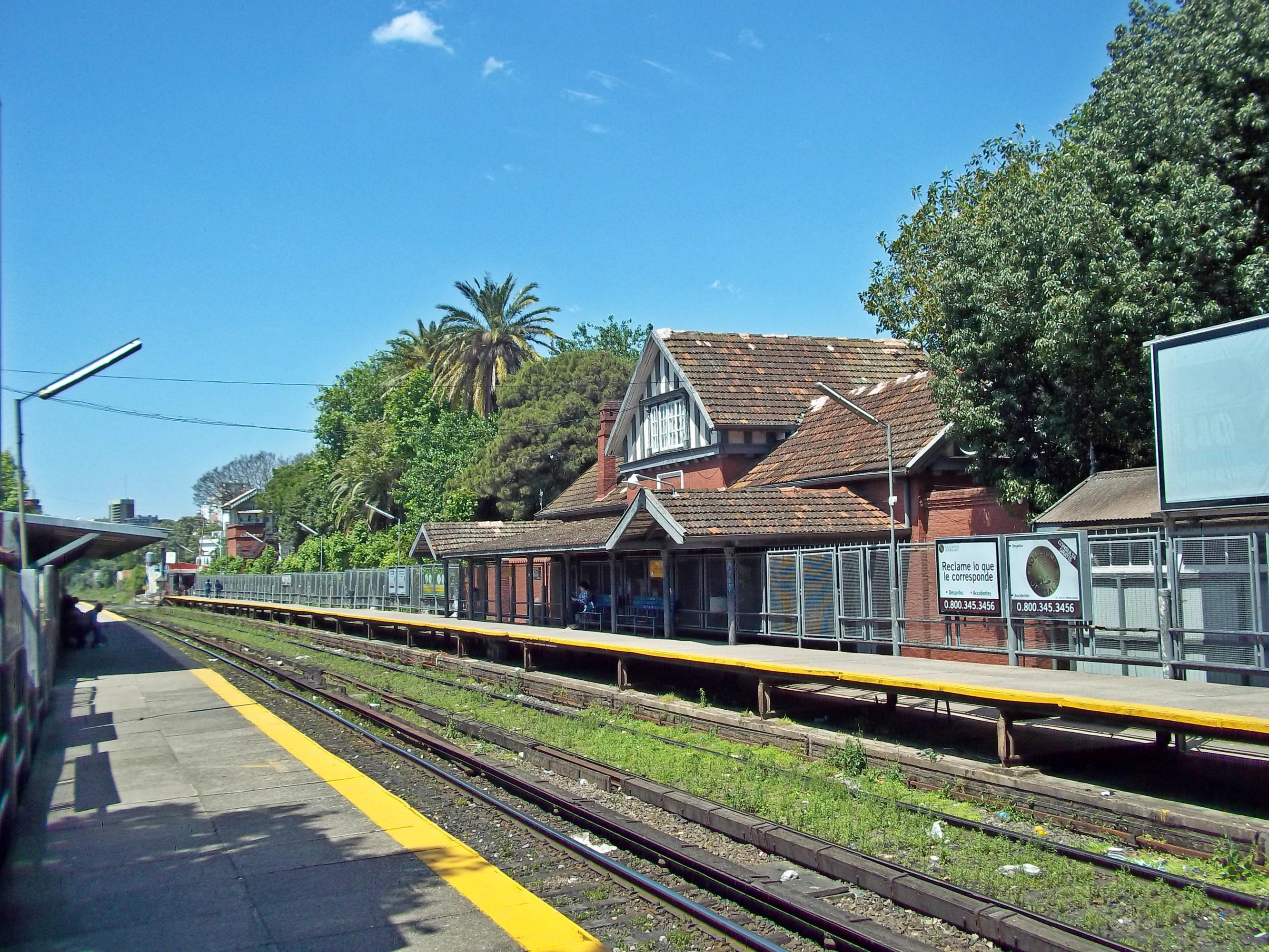
Pueyrredón Station

The district's name originated from a station of the Central Argentine Railway (today part of the Mitre Line) called "km 14". In 1907, it received the name of "Pueyrredón" in honour of the illustrious Brigadier Juan Martín de Pueyrredón. Since the railroad provided the area with its main transportation connections, the station became the neighbourhood's official namesake, and "Villa Pueyrredón" was established in 1923.

The population in this neighbourhood was established by European settlers, principally Italian and Spanish, all of whom arrived in the late 19th and early 20th centuries to be employed at the "great railway project" (the most important in Latin America).

== Parks and Squares ==
This neighborhood has several green spaces, the oldest of which is Leandro N. Alem Square (inaugurated on 25 May 1921). Alem Square is located between Larsen, Artigas, Zamudio, and Cochrane Streets.

The General Eduardo Lonardi Square has a very irregular outline, measuring 1.15 hectares (2.8 acres). It is located between the streets of Obispo San Alberto, Ladines, Jose L. Cabezón, Gral. José G. de Artigas, and the tracks of the Mitre Railroad. It has a notable illuminated and decorative fountain in the shape of a staggered pyramid.

Located on the street of Albarellos, Club Cultural y Deportivo 17 de Agosto is a football club founded in 1949. It is the most important club of the neighborhood and takes part in the First Division of Futsal's Championship (Argentine) AFA. Club Social Pueyrredón was founded on 1 June 1927, and is located at 5540 Condarco St. The Social, Cultural and Sports Club Gloria was established on 16 September 1936. Initially, it was located on Gabriela Mistral Street; it was subsequently relocated to 4970 Caracas St.

== Notable natives ==
- Roberto DeVicenzo: Golfer of international reputation.
- Marcelo Alexandre: Cyclist.
- Víctor Avedano: boxer.
- Alejandro Sabella, Federico Vairo, Carlos Veglio, Francisco Scagliotta: soccer players.
- Teresa Blasco: actress.
- Enrique Alejandro Mancini: Radio and Television host.
- Roberto Rufino: tango singer at Carlos Di Sarli and Aníbal Troilo Orchestra.
- Gloria Díaz: Tango singer.
- Eduardo Gelaz: Tango singer.
- Juan Carlos Copes: Tango dancer.
- Miguel Mateos: Rock Musician.
- Luis Rubio: Humorist, famous with his character Eber Ludueña.
- Roxana Callegari: tango dancer.
- Fabian Belmonte: tango dancer – bandoneonista.
