= Comuna 13 =

- Commune

- Location within Buenos Aires
- Coordinates: 34°33′13″S 58°27′50″W
- Country: Argentina
- Province: Buenos Aires

Area
  - Total: 14.6 km^{2} (5.6 sq mi)

Population (2010)
  - Total: 231,331
- Time zone: UTC-3 (ART)
  - Summer (DST): UTC-2
- Climate: BSh

Comuna 13 is one of the 15 communes in which the Autonomous City of Buenos Aires is divided. It is made up of the neighborhoods of Núñez, Belgrano and Colegiales. It is located in the north of the city, has an area of 14.6 km^{2} and a total population of 231,331 according to the 2010 census of which 103,832 are men and 127,499 are women, which represent 44.9% and 55.1% of the commune respectively. The 2001 census registered 228,226 inhabitants, which represents an increase of 1.4%.
