= Villa del Parque =

Coordinates: 34°36′S 58°29′W

- Neighborhood of Buenos Aires
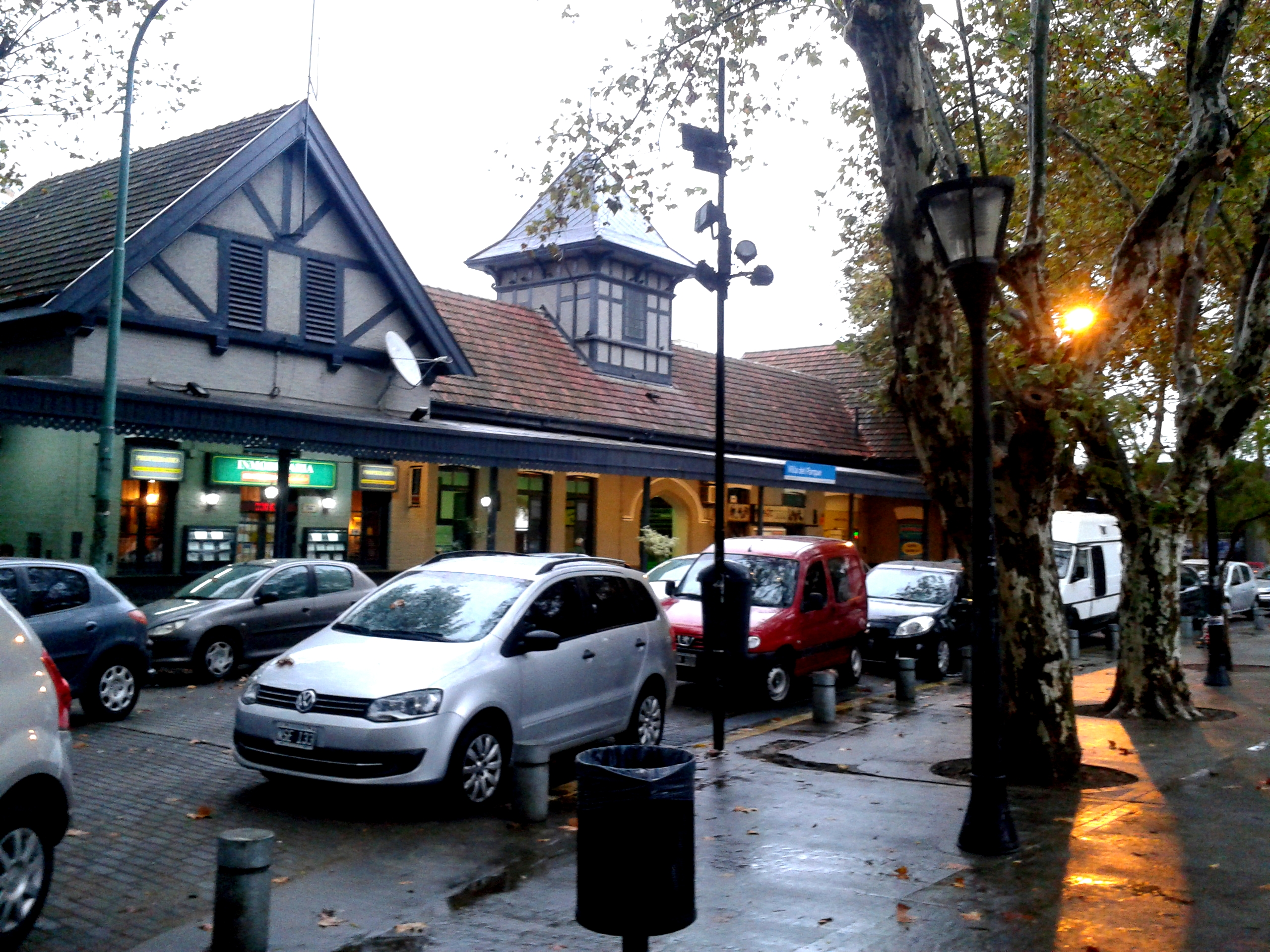
- San Martin Line railway station in the neighborhood.

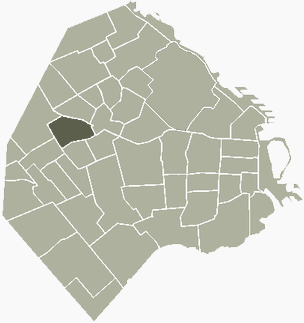
- Location of Villa del Parque within Buenos Aires
- Country: Argentina
- Autonomous City: Buenos Aires
- Comuna: C11

Area
  - Total: 3.6 km^{2} (1.4 sq mi)

Population
  - Total: 58,573
  - Density: 16,000/km^{2} (42,000/sq mi)
- Time zone: UTC-3 (ART)

Villa del Parque is a barrio (neighbourhood) or district within the city of Buenos Aires, Argentina. Its name translates as Village of the Park and was derived from its earliest beginnings, when several haciendas were all that existed, alongside a growing agricultural park in this section of Buenos Aires Province. Nowadays Villa del Parque is a middle class suburban neighbourhood, though with a central area in Cuenca street with many shops.

== History ==
Villa del Parque was officially incorporated on 8 November 1908, as a separate district of the city of Buenos Aires. This neighborhood and Villa Devoto, both got their start when an initiative to improve the teaching of agronomy during the presidency of Julio Roca was begun in 1901. Upon the establishment of a field station and model farm in 1903, population and developmental growth resulted in its expansion towards this agronomy park and the eventual opening of a railway station in August 1907.

== Notable residents ==
Famous people who lived in Villa del Parque include: the writer Julio Cortázar, the musicians Andrés Ciro Martínez, Horacio Salgán, and Sebastián Piana, tango singers Julio Sosa and Carlos Almada, the actors Guillermo Francella, Luciano Castro, and Pedrito Quartucci, the politicians Emilio Lamarca and Francisco Beiró, and the athletes Gabriela Sabatini and, currently, the goalkeeper Nicolás Cambiasso, and the coach Julio César Falcioni.
