= Comuna 11 =

- Commune

- Location within Buenos Aires
- Coordinates: 34°36′32″S 58°30′59″W
- Country: Argentina
- Province: Buenos Aires

Area
  - Total: 14.1 km^{2} (5.4 sq mi)

Population (2022)
  - Total: 203,491
- Time zone: UTC-3 (ART)
  - Summer (DST): UTC-2
- Climate: BSh

Comuna 11 is one of the 15 communes in which the Autonomous City of Buenos Aires is divided. It is made up of the neighborhoods of Villa Devoto, Villa del Parque, Villa Santa Rita, and Villa General Mitre. It is located in the midwest of the city, has an area of 14.1 km² and a total population of 189,832 according to the 2010 census.
