= Comuna 3 =

- Commune

- Location within Buenos Aires
- Coordinates: 34°36′10″S 58°23′48″W
- Country: Argentina
- Province: Buenos Aires

Area
  - Total: 6.4 km^{2} (2.5 sq mi)

Population (2010)
  - Total: 187,537
- Time zone: UTC-3 (ART)
  - Summer (DST): UTC-2
- Climate: BSh

Comuna 3 is one of the 15 communes in which the Autonomous City of Buenos Aires is divided. It is made up of the neighborhoods of Balvanera and San Cristóbal. It is located in the center-east of the city, has an area of 6.4 km^{2} and a total population of 187,537 according to the 2010 census of which 85,601 are men and 101,936 are women, which represent 45.6% and 54.4% of the commune respectively. The 2001 census registered 184,015 inhabitants, which represents an increase of 1.9%.
