= Comuna 4 =

- Commune

- Location within Buenos Aires
- Coordinates: 34°39′01″S 58°25′28″W
- Country: Argentina
- Province: Buenos Aires

Area
  - Total: 21.6 km^{2} (8.3 sq mi)

Population (2010)
  - Total: 218,245
- Time zone: UTC-3 (ART)
  - Summer (DST): UTC-2
- Climate: BSh

Comuna 4 is one of the 15 communes in which the Autonomous City of Buenos Aires is divided. It is made up of the neighborhoods of Barracas, La Boca, Nueva Pompeya and Parque Patricios. It is located in the southeast of the city, has an area of 21.6 km^{2} and a total population of 218,245 according to the 2010 census of which 103,166 are men and 115,079 are women, which represent 47.3% and 52.7% of the commune respectively. The 2001 census registered 215,539 inhabitants, which represents an increase of 1.3%.
