= Villa General Mitre =

Coordinates: 34°36′27.36″S 58°28′25.33″W

- Neighborhood of Buenos Aires
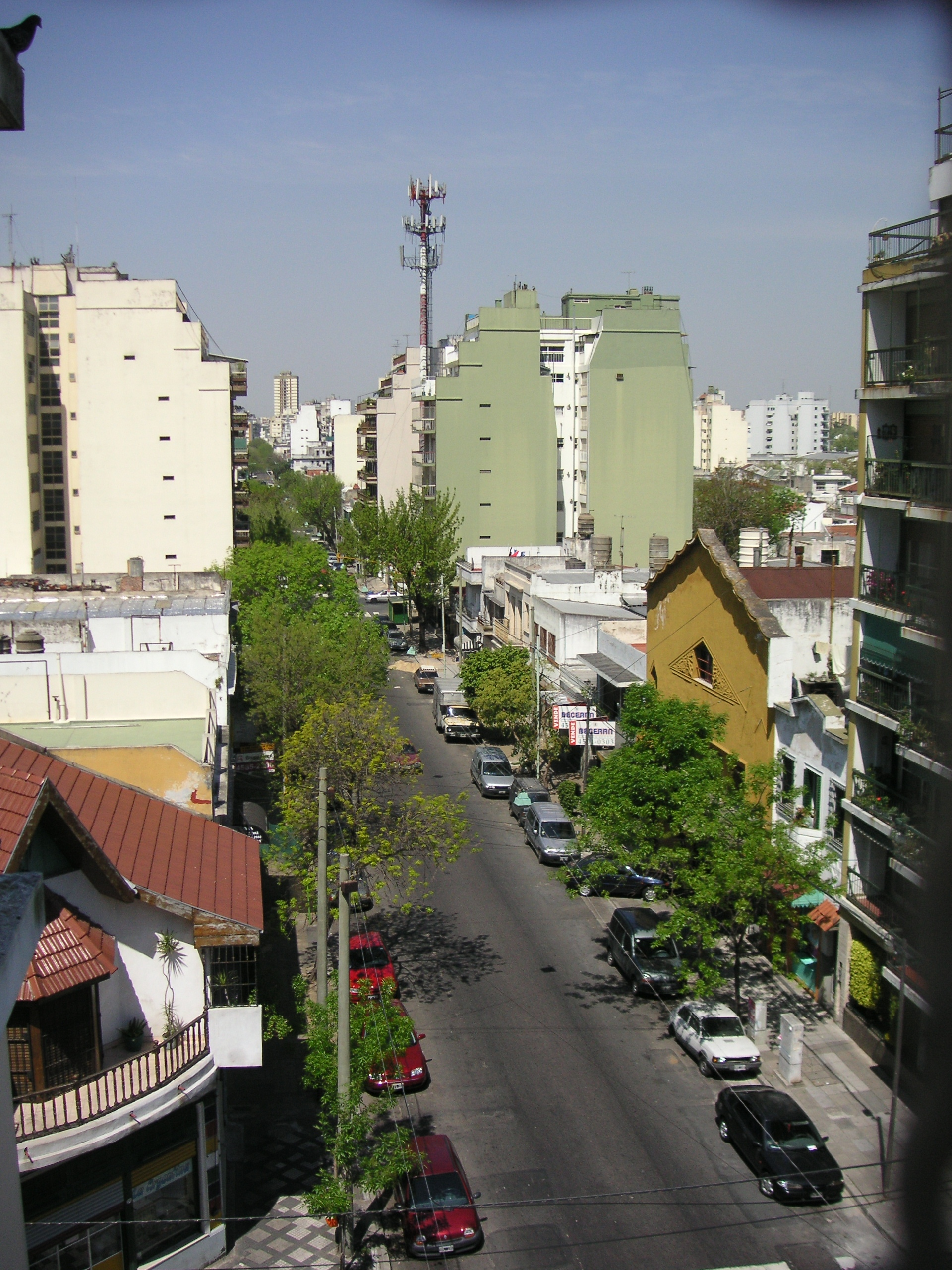
- José Artigas Street

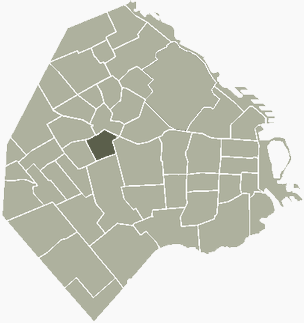
- Location of Villa General Mitre within Buenos Aires
- Country: Argentina
- Autonomous City: Buenos Aires
- Comuna: C11

Area
  - Total: 2.2 km^{2} (0.85 sq mi)

Population
  - Total: 36,090
  - Density: 16,000/km^{2} (42,000/sq mi)
- Time zone: UTC-3 (ART)

Villa General Mitre is a neighborhood, or barrio, of Buenos Aires.

The ward has a land area of 2.2 km^{2} (0.85 sq mi), and a population of 36,000. It was named after General Bartolomé Mitre, President of Argentina from 1862 to 1868, who had died in 1906, two years before the establishment of the barrio.

Villa Mitre was developed on land originally purchased by Francisco Ruiz de Gaona during the late colonial era, and he lived there until his death in 1813; Gaona Avenue, located along the ward's southern border, was named in his honor. The land was later subdivided into smallholdings mainly devoted to alfalfa, horticulture, and brick kilns. It became home to a large Italian immigrant community during the late 19th century, and in 1901 Mother Frances Xavier Cabrini founded the future Cabrini Institute here (one of 67 around the world, and her first in South America).

Initially a subdivision of the Villa Santa Rita ward to the west, Villa Mitre was formally established as such on November 6, 1908. The neighborhood remained prone to flooding until work began in 1929 on converting the Maldonado Stream into an underground storm sewer, above which Juan B. Justo Avenue was inaugurated in 1936. A block-sized lot adjacent to the Cabrini Institute was purchased by the City Government in 1937 to create Sáenz Peña Square, the neighborhood's largest park. Diego Maradona Stadium, home venue for the Argentinos Juniors football team, was inaugurated in Villa Mitre in 2003.
