= Comuna 1 =

- Commune

- Location within Buenos Aires
- Coordinates: 34°36′00″S 58°23′13″W
- Country: Argentina
- Province: Buenos Aires

Area
  - Total: 17.4 km^{2} (6.7 sq mi)

Population (2010)
  - Total: 205,886
- Time zone: UTC-3 (ART)
  - Summer (DST): UTC-2
- Climate: BSh

Comuna 1 is one of the 15 communes in which the Autonomous City of Buenos Aires is divided. It is made up of the neighborhoods of Retiro, San Nicolás, Puerto Madero, San Telmo, Monserrat and Constitución. It is located in the east of the city, has an area of 17.4 km^{2} and a total population of 205,886 according to the 2010 census of which 98,097 are men and 107,789 are women, which represent 47.6% and 52.4% of the commune respectively. The 2001 census registered 171,975 inhabitants, which represents an increase of 19.7%. With 50,948 inhabitants born outside the country, it is the commune that registers the highest proportion of foreigners (24.7%).
