= Comuna 15 =

- Commune

- Location within Buenos Aires
- Coordinates: 34°35′14″S 58°26′28″W
- Country: Argentina
- Province: Buenos Aires

Area
  - Total: 14.6 km^{2} (5.6 sq mi)

Population (2010)
  - Total: 182,574
- Time zone: UTC-3 (ART)
  - Summer (DST): UTC-2
- Climate: BSh

Comuna 15 is one of the 15 communes in which the Autonomous City of Buenos Aires is divided. It is made up of the neighborhoods of Villa Ortúzar, Chacarita, Villa Crespo, La Paternal, Agronomía and Parque Chas. It is located in the center-northwest of the city, has an area of 14.6 km^{2} and a total population of 182,574 according to the 2010 census of which 84,485 are men and 98,089 are women, which represent 46.3% and 53.7% of the commune respectively. The 2001 census registered 182,627 inhabitants, which represents a slight decrease of 0.03% .
