= Villa Riachuelo =

Coordinates: 34°42′S 58°28′W

- Neighborhood of Buenos Aires
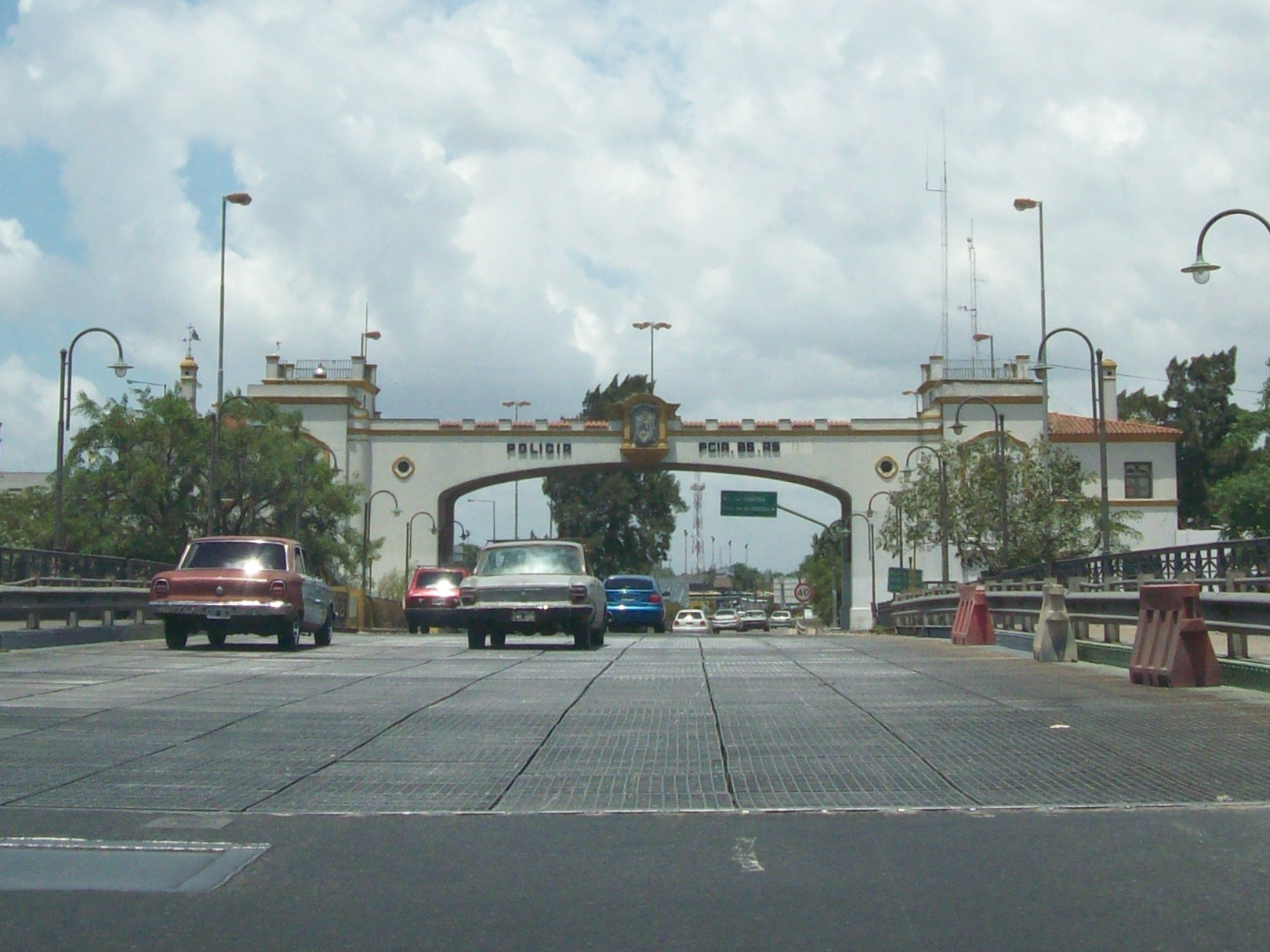
- de la Noria Bridge, the southernmost point in the city of Buenos Aires

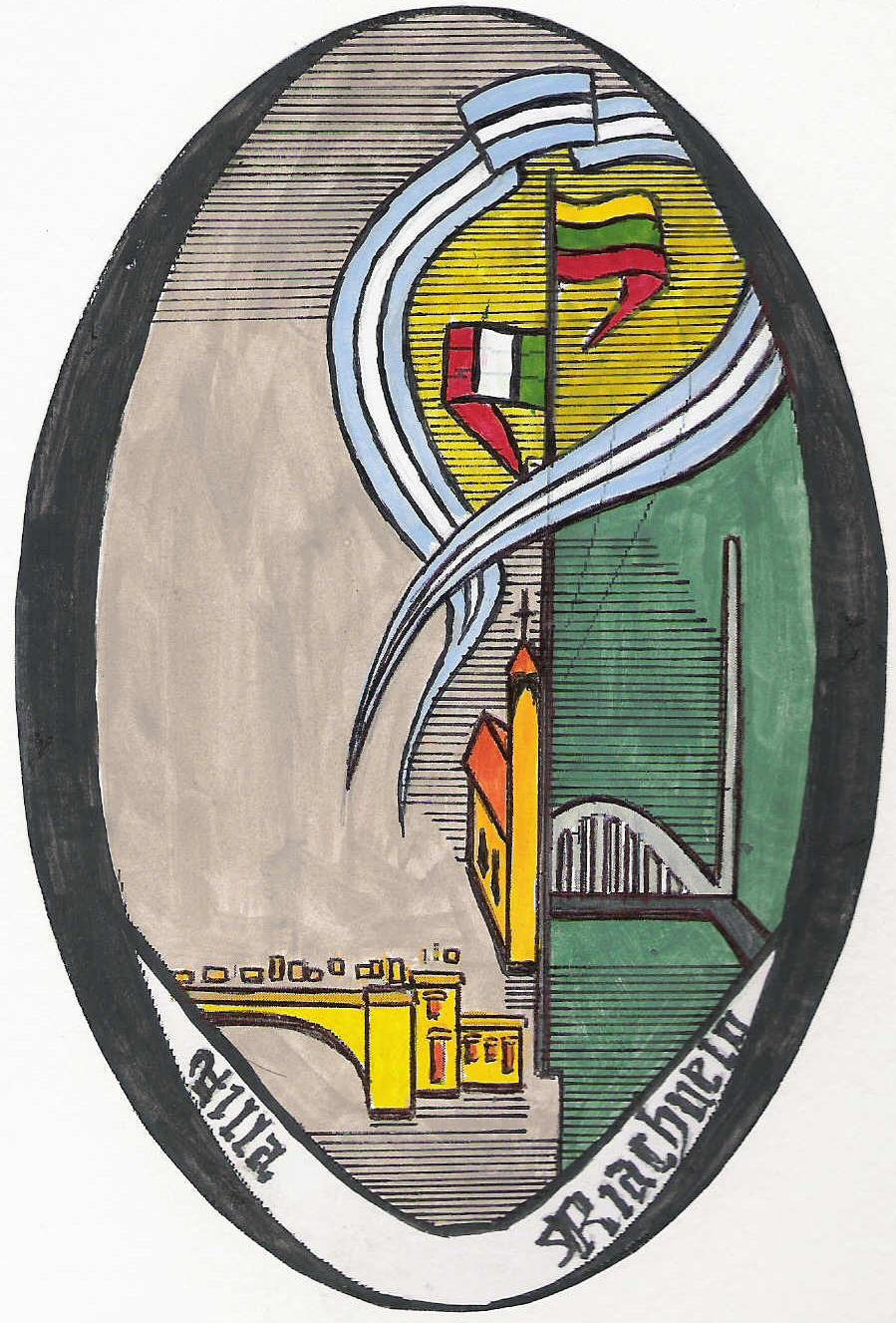
- Emblem

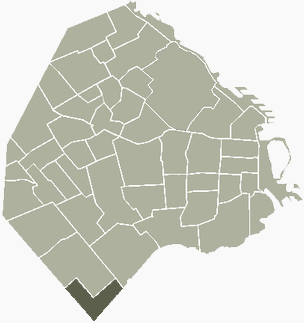
- Location of Villa Riachuelo within Buenos Aires
- Country: Argentina
- Autonomous City: Buenos Aires
- Comuna: C8
- Important sites: Autódromo Juan y Óscar Gálvez

Area
  - Total: 4.4 km^{2} (1.7 sq mi)

Population
  - Total: 14,960
  - Density: 3,400/km^{2} (8,800/sq mi)
- Time zone: UTC-3 (ART)

Villa Riachuelo is a barrio or neighborhood of Buenos Aires, Argentina. Located at the southernmost end of the city, Villa Riachuelo is bordered by the barrios of Villa Lugano to the north and Villa Soldati to the northeast, the Buenos Aires Province localities of Villa Fiorito and Lanús Oeste to the southeast and Ciudad Madero to the southwest.

It is home to the Autódromo Juan y Oscar Gálvez, home of the Argentine Grand Prix until 1998, and the Puente de la Noria which crosses the Riachuelo River.
