= Villa Ortúzar =

Coordinates: 34°34′50″S 58°28′06″W

- Neighborhood of Buenos Aires
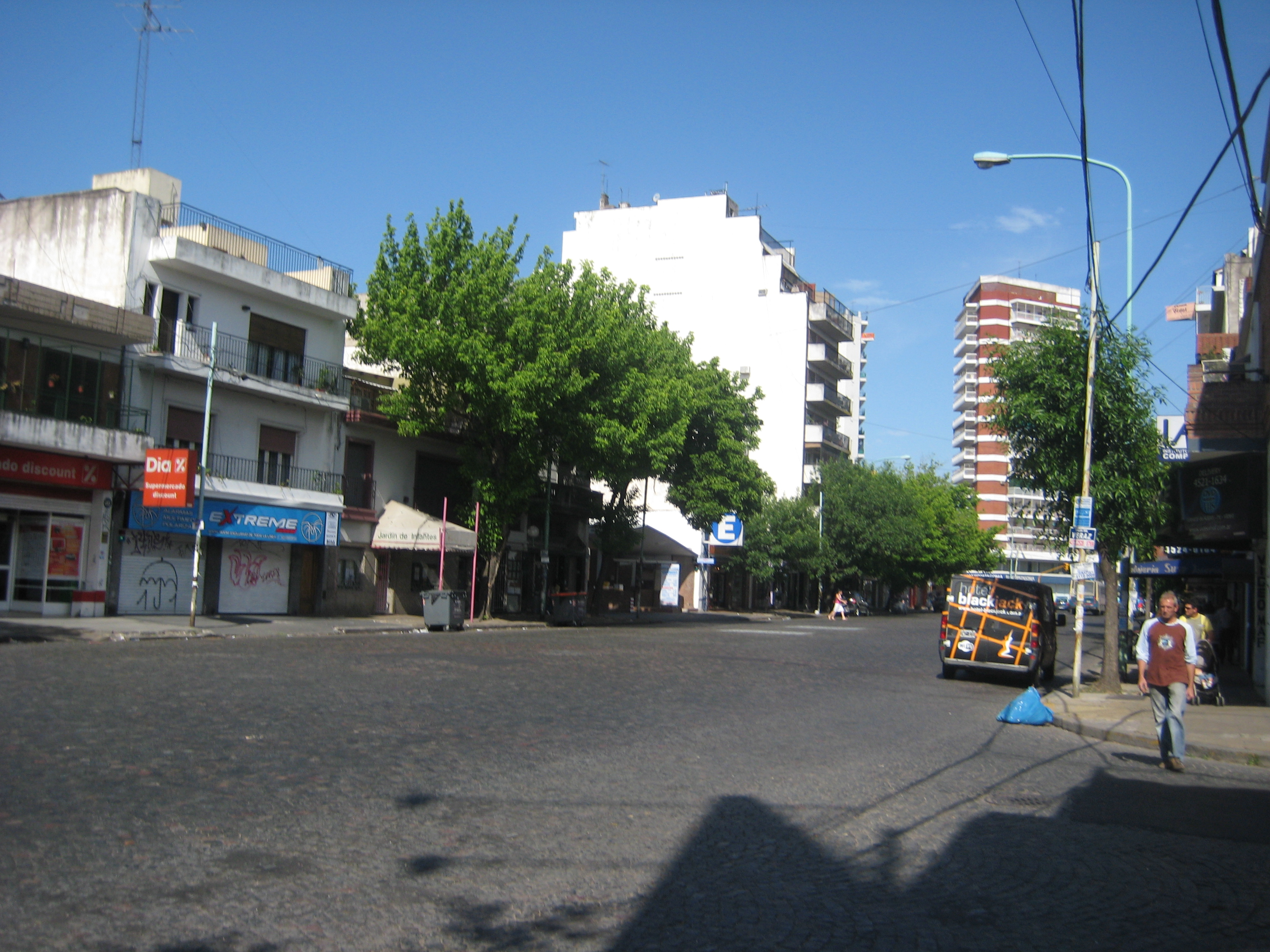
- Triunvirato Avenue, Villa Ortúzar

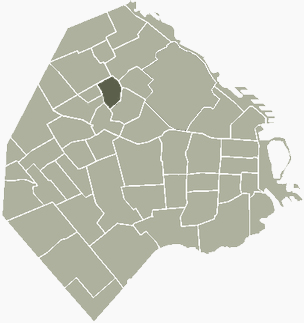
- Location of Villa Ortúzar within Buenos Aires
- Country: Argentina
- Autonomous City: Buenos Aires
- Comuna: C15

Area
  - Total: 1.2 km^{2} (0.46 sq mi)

Population (2001)
  - Total: 22,591
  - Density: 19,000/km^{2} (49,000/sq mi)
- Time zone: UTC-3 (ART)

Villa Ortúzar is one of the neighbourhoods of Buenos Aires. Its limits are La Pampa St., Forest Ave., Elcano Ave., Ferrocarril General Urquiza railroads, Del Campo Ave., Combatientes de Malvinas Ave. and Triunvirato Ave.

The "Villa" received its name as after Esq. Santiago Francisco de Ortúzar y Mendiola, a basque businessman who bought the "area" the 26th of April 1862 paying for it 265,000 pesos.
