= Comuna 5 =

- Commune

- Location within Buenos Aires
- Coordinates: 34°37′23″S 58°24′45″W
- Country: Argentina
- Province: Buenos Aires

Area
  - Total: 6.7 km^{2} (2.6 sq mi)

Population (2010)
  - Total: 179,005
- Time zone: UTC-3 (ART)
  - Summer (DST): UTC-2
- Climate: BSh

Comuna 5 is one of the 15 communes in which the Autonomous City of Buenos Aires is divided. It is made up of the neighborhoods of Almagro and Boedo. It is located in the center-east of the city, has an area of 6.7 km^{2} and a total population of 179,005 according to the 2010 census of which 80,806 are men and 98,199 are women, which represent 45.1% and 54.9% of the commune respectively. The 2001 census registered 173,769 inhabitants, which represents an increase of 3.0%.
