= Comuna 12 =

- Commune

- Location within Buenos Aires
- Coordinates: 34°34′07″S 58°28′58″W
- Country: Argentina
- Province: Buenos Aires

Area
  - Total: 15.6 km^{2} (6.0 sq mi)

Population (2010)
  - Total: 200,116
- Time zone: UTC-3 (ART)
  - Summer (DST): UTC-2
- Climate: BSh

Comuna 12 is one of the 15 communes in which the Autonomous City of Buenos Aires is divided. It is made up of the neighborhoods of Villa Pueyrredón, Villa Urquiza, Coghlan and Saavedra. It is located in the northwest of the city, has an area of 15.6 km^{2} and a total population of 200,116 according to the 2010 census of which 92,527 are men and 107,589 are women, which represent 46.2% and 53.8% of the commune respectively. The 2001 census registered 191,122 inhabitants, which represents an increase of 4.7%.
