= San Cristóbal, Buenos Aires =

Coordinates: 34.6235°S 58.3977°W

San Cristóbal
- Neighborhood of Buenos Aires
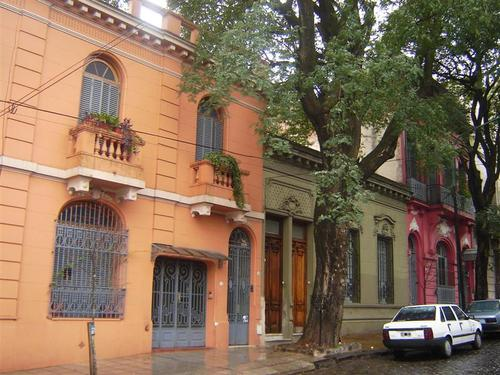
- 19th architecture in San Cristóbal, once ubiquitous in Buenos Aires

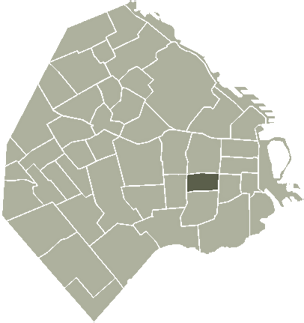
- Location of San Cristóbal within Buenos Aires
- Country: Argentina
- Autonomous City: Buenos Aires
- Comuna: C3

Area
  - Total: 2.1 km^{2} (0.81 sq mi)

Population (2001)
  - Total: 49,986
  - Density: 24,000/km^{2} (62,000/sq mi)
- Time zone: UTC-3 (ART)

San Cristóbal is a barrio or neighbourhood of the Argentine capital, Buenos Aires.

The Subte Line E goes under the San Juan Avenue.
