= Comuna 8 =

- Commune

- Location within Buenos Aires
- Coordinates: 34°41′09″S 58°27′20″W
- Country: Argentina
- Province: Buenos Aires

Area
  - Total: 21.9 km^{2} (8.5 sq mi)

Population (2010)
  - Total: 187,237
- Time zone: UTC-3 (ART)
  - Summer (DST): UTC-2
- Climate: BSh

Comuna 8 is one of the 15 communes in which the Autonomous City of Buenos Aires is divided. It is made up of the neighborhoods of Villa Soldati, Villa Lugano, and Villa Riachuelo. It is located in the southwest of the city, has an area of 21.9 km² and a total population of 187,237 according to the 2010 census of which 89,545 are men and 97,692 are women, which represent 47.8% and 52.2% of the commune respectively. The 2001 census registered 161,642 inhabitants, which represents an increase of 15.8%, being the commune that grew the second most in the last nine years. It is the commune with the second highest proportion of foreigners (23.4%), mostly from bordering countries, 2 of which 46.6% is of Bolivian origin, followed by those of Paraguayan origin (37.9%).
