= Comuna 7 =

- Commune

- Location within Buenos Aires
- Coordinates: 34°37′49″S 58°28′02″W
- Country: Argentina
- Province: Buenos Aires

Area
  - Total: 12.4 km^{2} (4.8 sq mi)

Population (2010)
  - Total: 220,591
- Time zone: UTC-3 (ART)
  - Summer (DST): UTC-2
- Climate: BSh

Comuna 7 is one of the 15 communes in which the Autonomous City of Buenos Aires is divided. It is made up of the neighborhoods of Flores and Parque Chacabuco. It is located in the mid-southwest of the city, has an area of 12.4 km² and a total population of 220,591 according to the 2010 census of which 102,481 are men and 118,110 are women, which represent 46.5% and 53.5% of the commune respectively. The 2001 census registered 197,333 inhabitants, which represents an increase of 11.8%.

It is the commune with the third highest proportion of foreigners (18.6%), mostly from neighboring countries; 2 of which 47.8% are of Bolivian origin, followed by those of Peruvian (12.9%) and Paraguayan origin (12.1%). Also noteworthy is the proportion of foreigners of Asian origin (8.6% of the total number of foreigners).
