= Comuna 9 =

- Commune

- Location within Buenos Aires
- Coordinates: 34°39′00″S 58°29′00″W
- Country: Argentina
- Province: Buenos Aires

Area
  - Total: 16.8 km^{2} (6.5 sq mi)

Population (2010)
  - Total: 161,797
- Time zone: UTC-3 (ART)
  - Summer (DST): UTC-2
- Climate: BSh

Comuna 9 is one of the 15 communes in which the Autonomous City of Buenos Aires is divided. It is made up of the neighborhoods of Liniers, Mataderos and Parque Avellaneda. It is located in the southwest of the city, has an area of 16.8 km² and a total population of 161,797 according to the 2010 census.
