= Colegiales =

Coordinates: 34°34′27″S 58°26′57″W

- Barrio
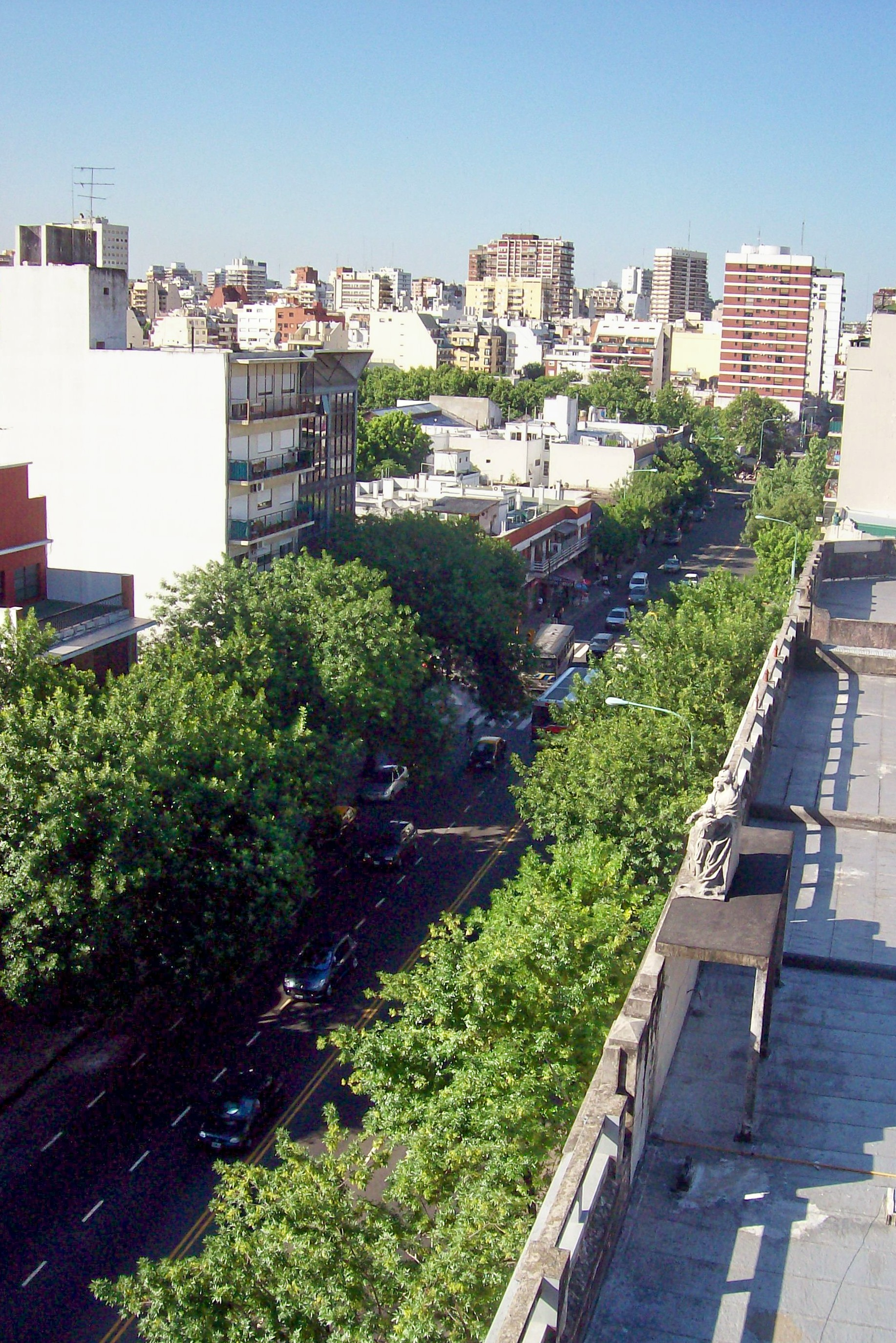
- Federico Lacroze Avenue

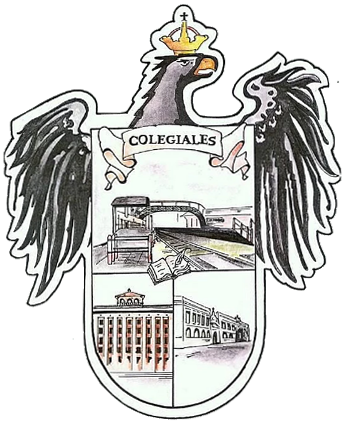
- Emblem
- Interactive map of Colegiales
- Country: Argentina
- Autonomous City: Buenos Aires
- Comuna: C13

Area
  - Total: 2.3 km^{2} (0.89 sq mi)
- Elevation: 25 m (82 ft)

Population (2001)
  - Total: 56,998
  - Density: 25,000/km^{2} (64,000/sq mi)
- Time zone: UTC-3 (ART)
- Postal code: 1426

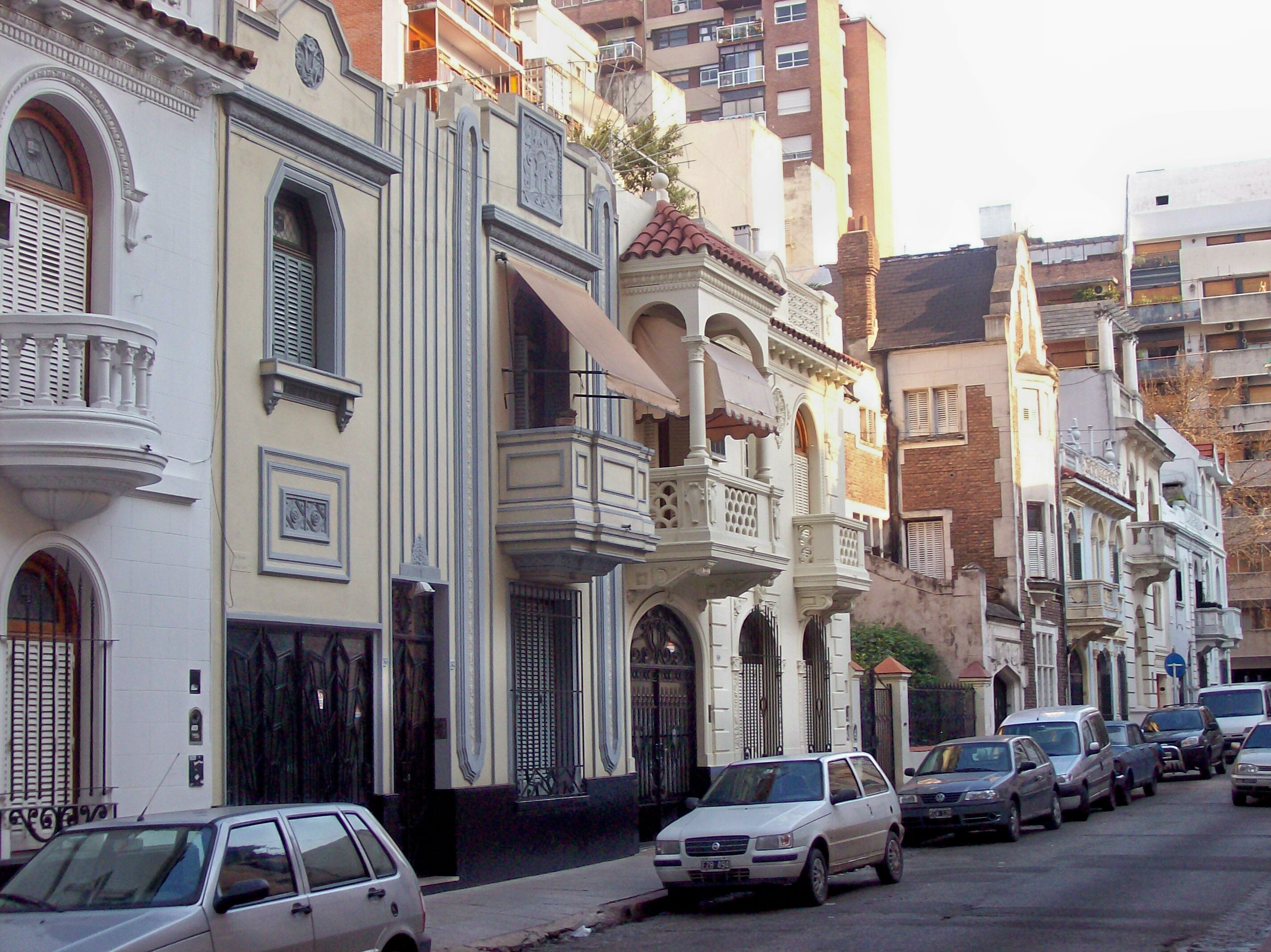
Gorostiaga Street

Colegiales is a barrio or district in Buenos Aires, Argentina. It is located between Alvarez Thomas av., Forest av., De los Incas av., Virrey del Pino st., Cabildo av., Jorge Newbery st., Crámer st. and Dorrego av.

There are large and tall buildings that go from the Crámer street to Avenida Cabildo and traditional houses up to three stories. This district has become a busy one with many pedestrians and cars on the streets. This neighborhood is mainly residential, with some non-residential areas like the classification yard in the north-east zone, the fairs in the south-west (where until the late 1960s there was another classification yard), and the UCA Colegiales campus in the south-east.

== History ==
The history of Colegiales is the same as the barrio of Chacarita because it used to be called Chacarita de los Colegiales. This neighborhood had chacras and quintas (smallholdings), where the Jesuits hosted retreats with their students. When this order was expelled in 1767, the lands were expropriated by the Spanish Crown. Beginning with the government of Bernardino Rivadavia in 1826, workers and immigrants from Europe settled in the area that later became the two neighborhoods of Chacarita and Colegiales.

== Sports ==
In this district the Club Atlético Colegiales developed, a football club that plays in the regionalized third tier of Argentine football. Today, however, it is in the city of Munro, north of Buenos Aires.

== Tourism ==
Colegiales is one of Buenos Aires' smallest districts. Its main thoroughfare is Federico Lacroze avenue, where most neighborhood traffic and retail stores are concentrated. Alvarez Thomas avenue is a study in contrasts, lined with single-family rowhouses along one side and almost entirely with apartment blocks along the other. The avenue also separates Colegiales with its neighbor to the south, the barrio of Chacarita.

The Pasaje General Paz (a narrow pedestrian promenade) attracts visitors near and far, with its mature trees, streams and ornate, balconied Andalusian-style patio. Colegiales is also one of the city's "greenest" areas, being also home to Juan José Paso Plaza, Portugal Plaza, San Miguel de Garicoits Plaza, Colegiales Plaza and Mafalda Plaza -known for its whimsical art donated to it by renowned local cartoonist Joaquin Lavado ("Quino").

== Social and cultural life ==
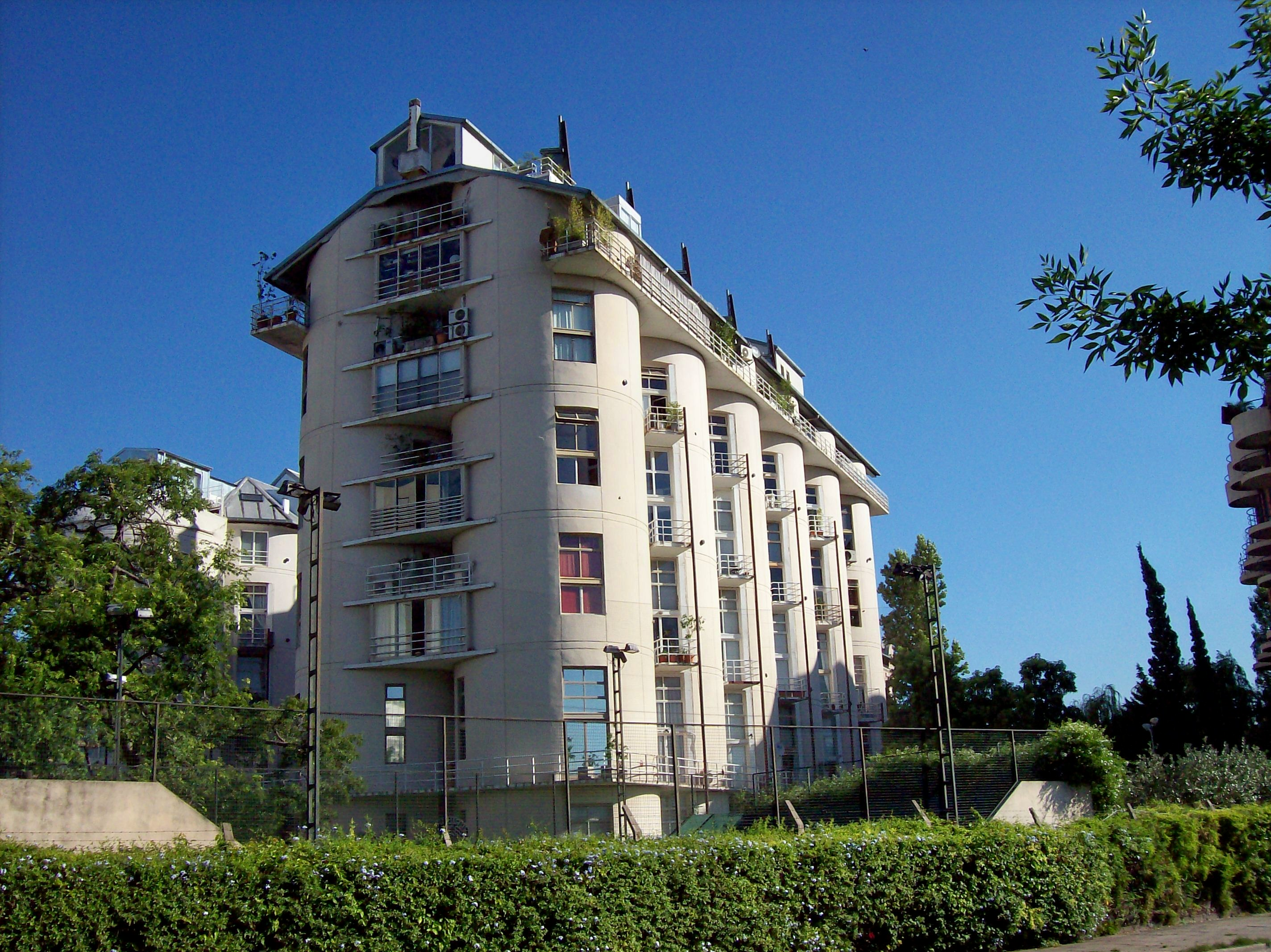
Old silos in the Colegiales district, now upscale lofts.

The Colegiales Athletic and Social Club is probably the neighborhood's favorite social venue. Located on 2860 Teodoro García Street, it was famous in decades past for Roberto "Polaco" Goyeneche's frequent Tango recitals there. Colegiales was also home to the city's first cinema, Las Familias. The cinema was probably better-known, however, for the people who had it built than for its distinction as a historical first. Though now a distant memory, the colorful Anselmis entertained generations of locals with their namesake circus on Lacroze and Cabildo Avenues. Nnone of these establishments still exist, as they either shut down or relocated to the more upscale Belgrano, to the east.

The Argos Cinema (on 3455 Federico Lacroze Ave.) was long the most popular in Colegiales, as it included a cinema, theatre, meeting hall (popular with evangelists) and a dance hall. It was renovated and reopened in May 2012 as the Vorterix Theater, a music venue with a 1500 capacity theater which also houses the radio station Vorterix Rock. Another radio station, Radio Metro (95.1 MHz), is also based in Colegiales, on Conde street.

Colegiales' cafés, many still open, are often not unlike pool halls, frequented by night owls and assorted "ne'er-do-wells." Perhaps the best-known is the Café Argos (Federico Lacroze & Álvarez Thomas Avenues), which still boasts its period decor and billiard tables.

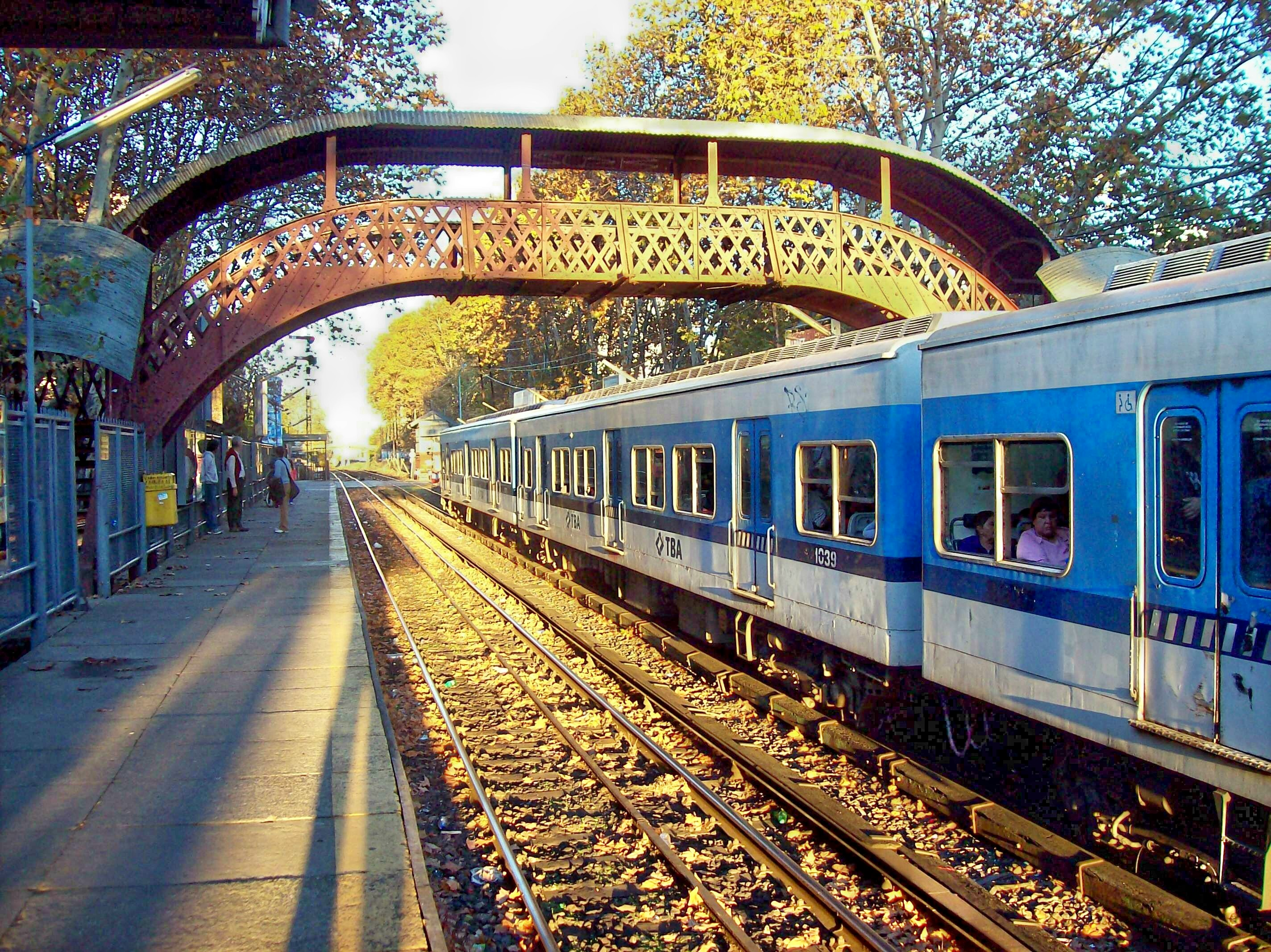
TBA Colegiales Station

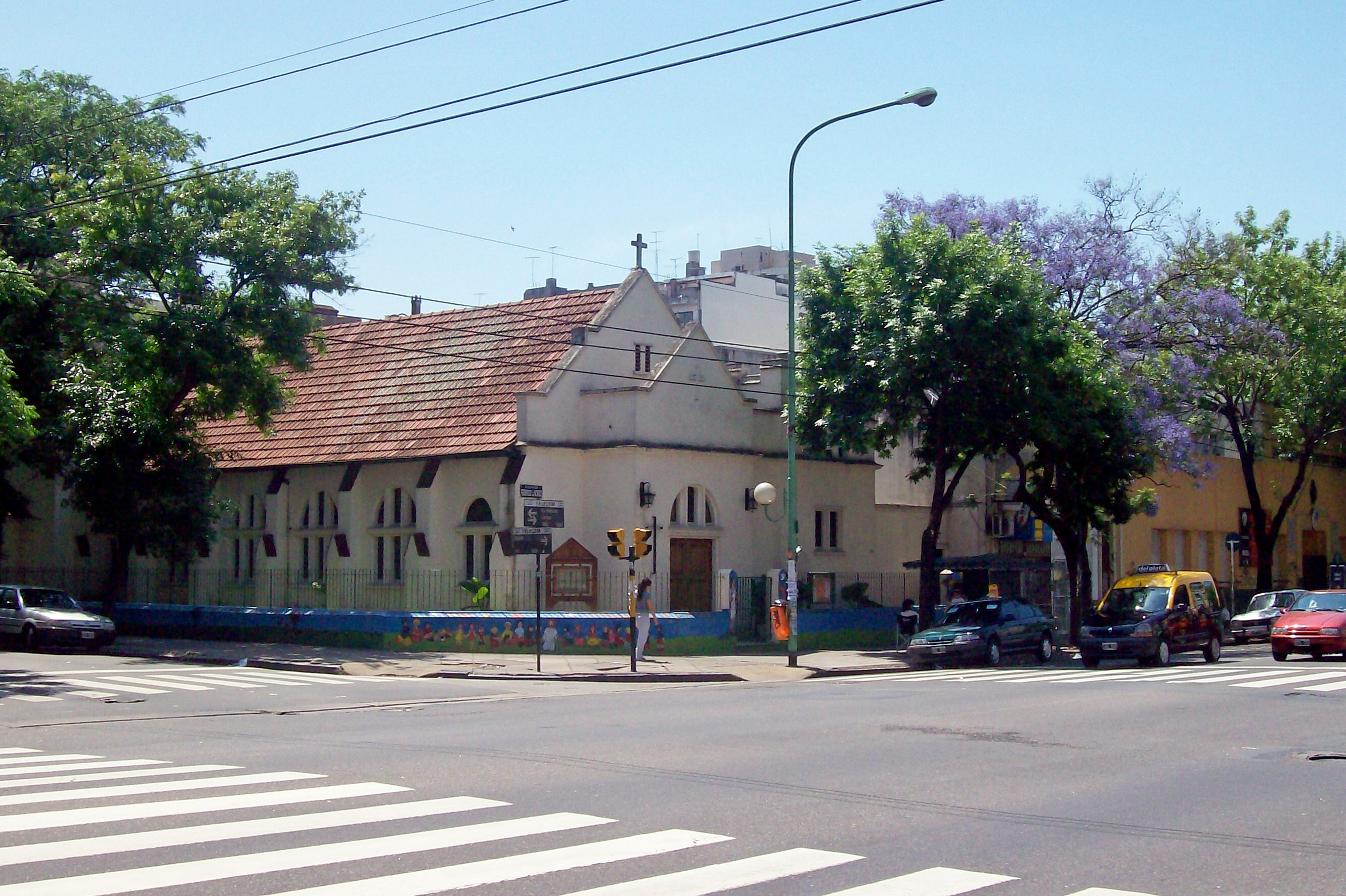
Good Pastor Evangelical Church

The Federico Lacroze Area Development Council, on 3955 Maure Street, publishes its own periodical, El Fomentista. Socially and culturally invested, it provides a forum for literary circles like the Enrique Banchs Literary Society and the Chacarita-Colegiales Historical Society. Colegiales is also home to a Rotary Club, on Arribeños & José Hernández Streets and a Lions Club, on 2964 Teodoro García St.

Recently, upscale lofts were developed in what years ago were the massive Buenos Aires flour mills (known also as Silos Minetti), on 1916 Dorrego Street. Elegant and trendy, they were built into the silos themselves (see photo above) and have become popular with local yuppies.

Until 1988, the popular Dorrego Farmers' Market operated in Colegiales, on Álvarez Thomas & Dorrego Avenues. Its stalls were run by a veritable "United Nations" of Portuguese, Italian, Spanish and Japanese-Argentines offering all manner of produce and homemade canned goods. It later became Buenos Aires' largest flea market, famous for its supply of everything from African handicrafts to antique china, costumes and housewares. The flea market was renovated by the City Government and reopened in 2011.

Colegiales celebrates its Neighborhood Day on September 21.

== Religious heritage ==
Colegiales also has a rich religious heritage. The Holiest Corpus Christi Monastery (450 Amenábar St.) has been the centuries-old home to the Order of "Barefoot Carmelites". Likewise, the Church of St. Paul the Apostle (795 Álvarez Thomas Ave.) and the Parish of Our Lord of the Miracle of Salta (1157 Moldes St.) still draw a sizable flock. These houses of worship share the Colegiales faithful with several smaller Catholic churches and others, notably the Evangelical Church of Colegiales, at 3429 Federico Lacroze Avenue.
