= Coghlan, Buenos Aires =

Coordinates: 34°33′38.5″S 58°28′29″W

Coghlan
- Barrio
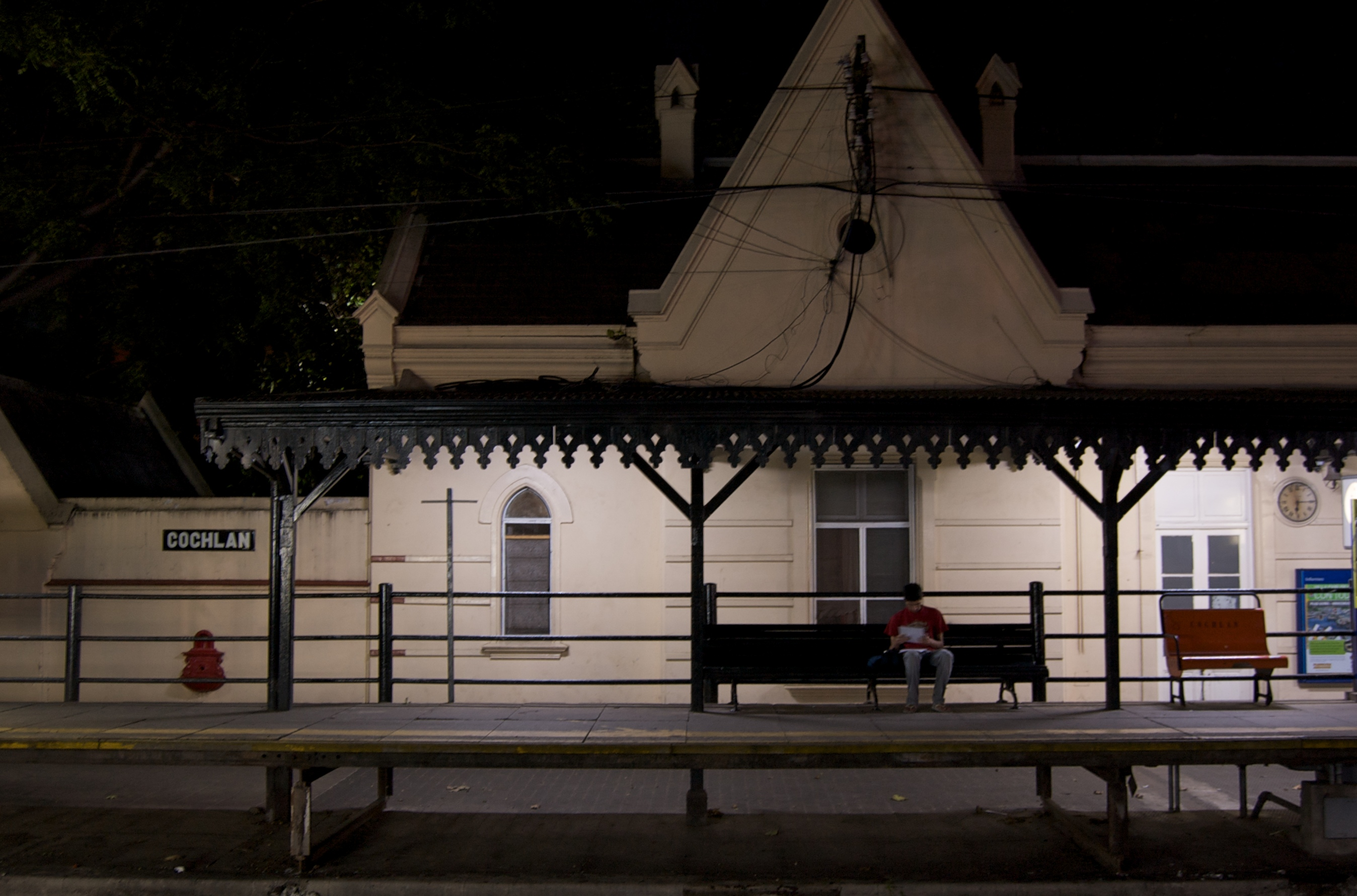
- The Coghlan Train Station, from which the barrio gets its name

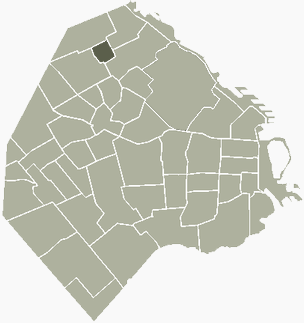
- Location of Coghlan within Buenos Aires
- Country: Argentina
- Autonomous City: Buenos Aires
- Comuna: C12

Area
  - Total: 1.3 km^{2} (0.50 sq mi)

Population (2001)
  - Total: 19,177
  - Density: 15,000/km^{2} (38,000/sq mi)
- Time zone: UTC-3 (ART)

Coghlan is a barrio (neighbourhood) in the city of Buenos Aires, Argentina.

This middle class neighbourhood is located between Belgrano, Saavedra, Núñez and Villa Urquiza, originally inhabited by Irish and English immigrants.

The 1887 sale of 30 hectares (75 acres) of land to the Mitre Railway led to the railway's extension under the direction of Irish Argentine engineer John Coghlan, in whose honor the train station was named. The sale of residential lots after 1891 led to the rapid growth of what was then a suburb of Buenos Aires. In 1896, Dr. Ignacio Pirovano opened an emergency hospital, and it is among the city's public medical facilities today.

Coghlan was formally designated as a barrio (borough) in 1968 and is today still a quiet bedroom community known for its big, English style residences.
