= Villa Crespo =

Coordinates: 34°36′S 58°27′W

- Neighborhood of Buenos Aires
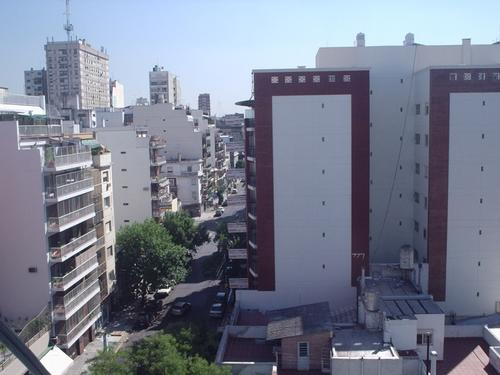
- Cityscape view over Villa Crespo

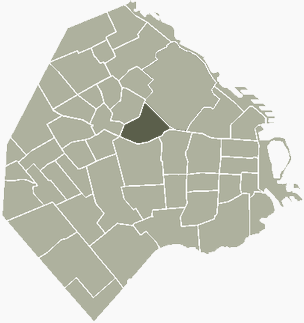
- Location of Villa Crespo within Buenos Aires
- Country: Argentina
- Autonomous City: Buenos Aires
- Comuna: C15
- Important sites: Memorial to Osvaldo Pugliese

Area
  - Total: 3.8 km^{2} (1.5 sq mi)

Population (2001)
  - Total: 89,859
  - Density: 24,000/km^{2} (61,000/sq mi)
- Time zone: UTC-3 (ART)

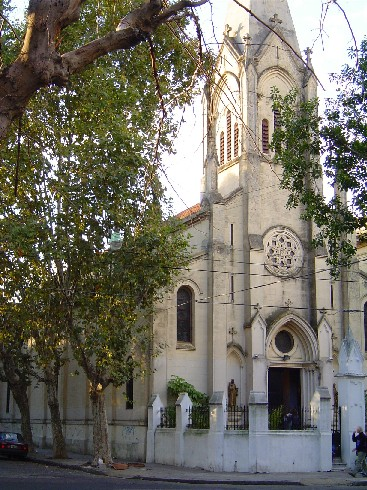
Church of St. Joseph, Villa Crespo.

Villa Crespo is a middle class neighborhood in Buenos Aires, Argentina, located in the geographical center of the city. It had a population of 83,646 people in 2001, and thus currently a population density of 23,235 inhabitants/km^{2}. Villa Crespo celebrates its anniversary on June 3.

Villa Crespo was also sometimes referred to as Palermo Queens around 2007. This trade name, caused a reaction from the Neighborhood Association and Historical Studies at the Ombudsman of the city of Buenos Aires. They issued Resolution 2549/07, resulting in 14 realtors being sanctioned for publishing misleading advertising, in violation of the consumer competition law and fair trading law, and violation of the law of neighborhood boundaries and the tourist protection law. Palermo is considered a more expensive neighborhood and renaming Villa Crespo as part of Palermo would allow people to charge higher rents, etc.

It grew around the "Fábrica Nacional de Calzado" (National Shoe Factory, 1888). The first name of the neighborhood was San Bernardo and that remained in general use during its first twenty-five years, in spite of it being officially named after Buenos Aires mayor, Antonio F. Crespo. On April 11, 1894, the San Bernardo church was opened to the public. Villa Crespo was home to several conventillos, including the most famous one, the Conventillo de la Paloma. Under Juan B. Justo avenue runs the Maldonado waterstream, culverted to prevent major floods.

Villa Crespo has been traditionally associated with the Jewish community, hosting several synagogues, Hebrew schools and youth movements. Its traditional football club is Atlanta.

Until the 1980s, it had a clothing commercial centre in Scalabrini Ortiz Avenue (previously named Canning), but this has lost its strength over the years. The main commercial hub is still the intersection of Scalabrini Ortiz and Corrientes avenues, these two roads being also the main access of the neighborhood.

Some leather clothes stores are located in the area around Murillo street, and on Warnes Avenue are numerous auto-part stores. On the other hand, the neighborhood has a relative lack of parks and squares.

== Villa Crespo people ==
- Juan Gelman, poet
- Julian Bourdeu
- Leopoldo Marechal, writer, who located many episodes of his Adán Buenosayres novel in Villa Crespo
- Lucrecia Martel, Argentinian director
- Osvaldo Pugliese, tango musician
- Remigio Iriondo
- Salvador Benedit
- Wos, Argentinian rapper

== Filmed in Villa Crespo ==
- Bolivia, 2001.
