= Parque Chas =

Coordinates: 34°35′06″S 58°28′46″W

- Neighborhood of Buenos Aires
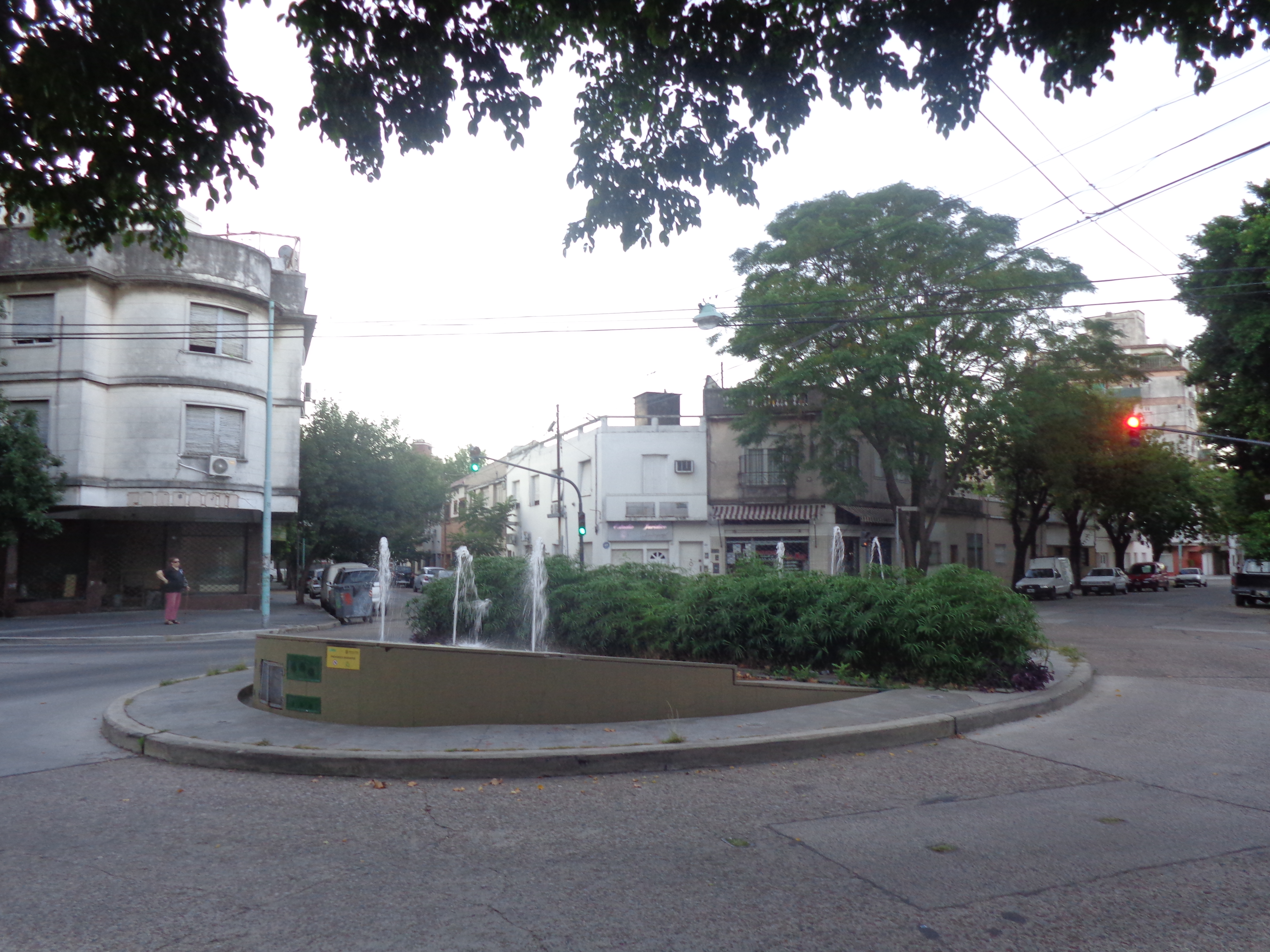
- Parque Chas intersection

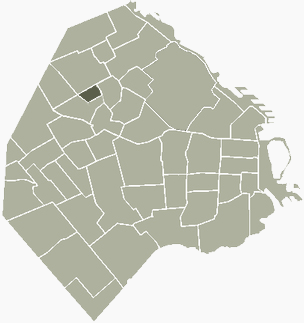
- Location of Parque Chas within Buenos Aires
- Country: Argentina
- Autonomous City: Buenos Aires
- Comuna: C15

Area
  - Total: 1.4 km^{2} (0.54 sq mi)

Population
  - Total: 18,926
  - Density: 14,000/km^{2} (35,000/sq mi)
- Time zone: UTC-3 (ART)

Parque Chas is a neighborhood in Buenos Aires, Argentina, reinstated on 6 December 2005 through By-law No. 1907/06.

Parque Chas is the smallest district in Buenos Aires and is bounded by La Pampa, Triunvirato, Combatientes de Malvinas, Chorroarín, and Constituyentes streets. It is also the only district not organized following a grid pattern. Three streets (Victorica, Avalos and Gándara) meet in the center of the neighborhood forming a six-points intersection. A concentric pattern of streets, named after European cities, surrounds this center. The pattern breaks when drawing closer to the major avenues (La Pampa, Triunvirato, and Avenida de Los Incas), where the grid pattern resumes. There are two small parks within the barrio.

Parque Chas plays a prominent role in Tomas Eloy Martinez' book The Tango Singer.
