= Agronomía =

Coordinates: 34°36′S 58°29′W

- Neighborhood
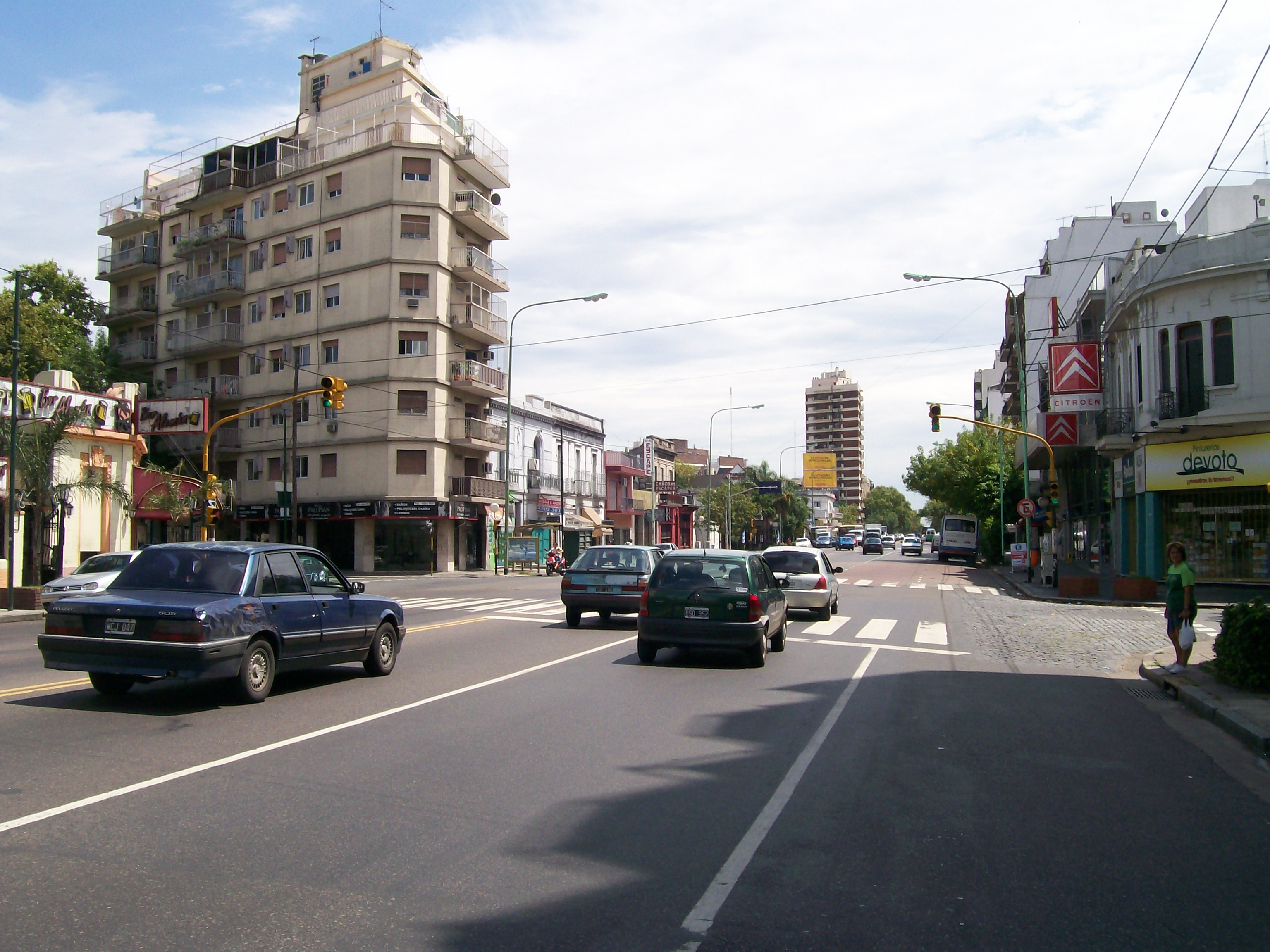
- San Martin Avenue, Agronomia's southern limit

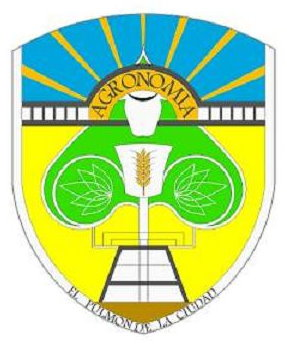
- Coat of arms

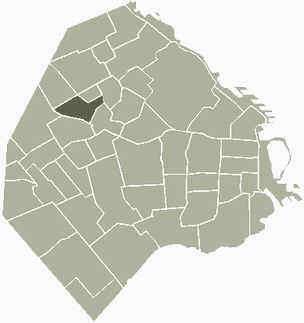
- Location of Agronomía within Buenos Aires
- Country: Argentina
- Autonomous City: Buenos Aires
- Comuna: C15
- Important sites: Faculty of Agronomy and Veterinary Science

Area
  - Total: 2.1 km^{2} (0.81 sq mi)

Population
  - Total: 13,963
  - Density: 6,600/km^{2} (17,000/sq mi)
- Time zone: UTC-3 (ART)
- Day: September 25

Agronomía is a barrio or district in the centre part of City of Buenos Aires, Argentina. It gets its name from the University of Buenos Aires Faculty of Agronomy (Facultad de Agronomía, in Spanish) based in the neighborhood. Its boundaries are Avenida San Martín, Campana, Avenida Salvador María del Carril, Avenida de los Constituyentes, and Avenida Chorroarín.

Parque Chas was previously a part of Agronomía, but was awarded barrio status in December 2005.

== History ==
The fields were originally property of the Society of Jesus, and they were called Chacra de los jesuitas. When this religious order was expelled in 1769, these fields were taken from the Society of Jesus, and expropriated into the government's control. The government then gave them to the Real Colegio de San Carlos and its successors, one of them being Colegio Nacional de Buenos Aires. The first generations stayed there on vacation, for this reason it was known as Chacarita de los Colegiales.

At the end of the 19th century a park was built on these lands. In 1901 the Executive Branch of the government gave 185 hectares (460 acres) for the construction of the park, but 30 of those hectares were to be used for the Estación Agronómica con Granja Modelo (Agronomic Station and Model Farm) and the Escuela de Agricultura (Agricultural School), an educational institution necessary for the agro-export driven development model that the government was following at the time.

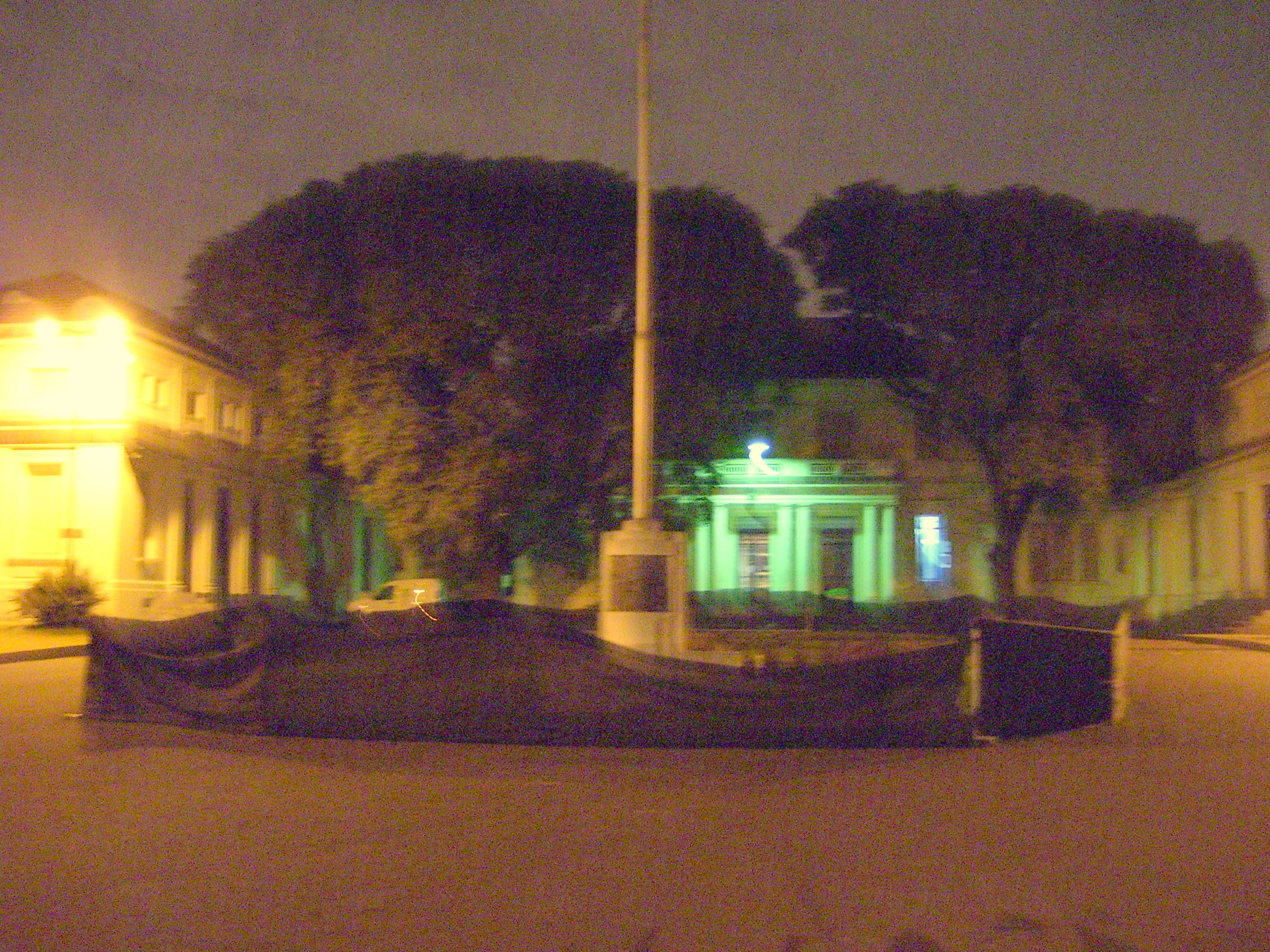
The University of Buenos Aires School of Agronomy, neighborhood namesake.

The neighbourhood was then formed around the park, which carried a series of names until de Agronomía (of Agronomy) was settled on. The Estación Agronómica (Agronomic Station) also experienced a change of name, becoming the Instituto Superior de Agronomía y Veterinaria (Superior Institute of Agronomy and Veterinarian Science). The institute was founded on 25 September 1904, and five years later became the Facultad de Agronomía y Veterinaria (Faculty of Agronomy and Veterinary Sciences) of the Universidad de Buenos Aires. In 1984, the two parts of the Faculty split, resulting in the creation of the Faculty of Agronomy and the Faculty of Veterinary Sciences.

== Notable sites ==
The neighbourhood is home to a large complex owned by the University of Buenos Aires, which serves as the site for its Faculty of Agronomy, its Faculty of Veterinary Sciences, and other dependencies, including the Escuela Agropecuaria y Agroalimentaria, a special agronomy-oriented high school. The complex also houses the Villa Ortúzar Meteorological Station, part of the Servicio Meteorológico Nacional. The Faculty of Veterinary Sciences campus is also home to two museums, one of dedicated to animal anatomy and the other of to surgical pathologies. The Faculty of Agronomy, in addition, contains the Agricultural Machinery Museum and a project titled "Del Campo a la Ciudad" (From the Countryside to the city), a 16 hectare farm used for educational purposes.

Another notable building is the former house of Julio Cortázar, a famous Argentine writer, who lived in an apartment at Artigas 3246. Currently, a street in the neighbourhood carries his name.
