= Villa Santa Rita =

Coordinates: 34.6124°S 58.4811°W

- Neighborhood of Buenos Aires
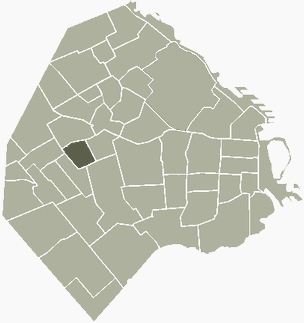
- Location of Villa Santa Rita within Buenos Aires
- Country: Argentina
- Autonomous City: Buenos Aires
- Comuna: C11

Area
  - Total: 2.3 km^{2} (0.89 sq mi)

Population
  - Total: 33,850
  - Density: 15,000/km^{2} (38,000/sq mi)
- Time zone: UTC-3 (ART)

Villa Santa Rita is a barrio (district) of Buenos Aires, Argentina. It is located in the western part of Capital Federal.
