= Vehicle registration plates of Argentina =

Argentine Republic
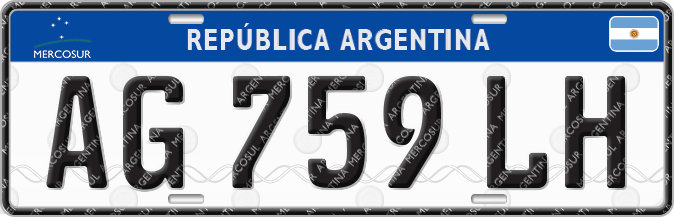
- Argentina regular legal standard number plate, current Mercosur format.
- Country: Argentina
- Country code: RA

Current series
- Size: 400 mm × 130 mm 15.7 in × 5.1 in
- Serial format: AB 123 CD
- Colour (front): Black on white
- Colour (rear): Black on white

Argentine license plates (in Spanish, chapas patentes or simply patentes) are used to uniquely identify motor vehicles on the roads of Argentina. The current system employs three letters followed by three digits, issued consecutively, but the license plate system underwent significant changes before the use of this format.

The history of license plates in Argentina can be broken down in two major phases, the decentralized phase (until 1972) and the centralized one (since 1972). During the decentralized phase, license plates were assigned by each municipality or by the provinces, while during the second phase, the national state took charge of standardizing and centralizing the design and style.

== Early 1900s-1972: Decentralization ==
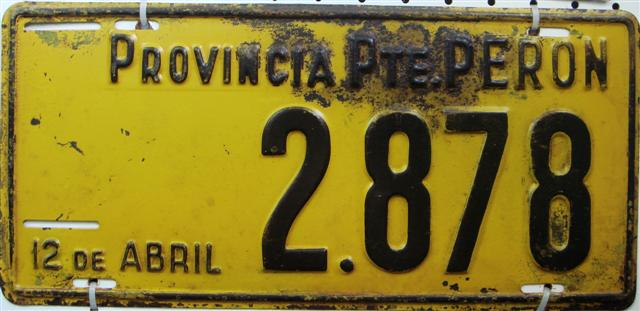
Argentine patent from the 1940s

The first formal patents were issued in the early 1900s, although few records of them exist. The period between 1916 and 1969 was the most prolific in designs. Each district was allowed to issue its own license plates.

== 1964-1994: Identifying the provinces ==
In 1958, under Decree Law 6582, the National Registry of Automotive Property (RNPA) was created. It is a body dependent on the Ministry of Justice and Human Rights, whose mission is to regulate everything related to the registration of ownership of motor vehicles, subsequent procedures and pledge credits. Its first objective was to unify, regulate and standardize the different identifications or automotive patents, a task carried out until then by each municipality in the country autonomously.

The format of the first license plates created by the RNPA, issued from June 1, 1964, consisted of a letter and six numerical digits printed in white in relief on a black background, and all its content was framed by a thin white painted box also in relief. The letter identified the province or district where the automobile was located, while the numbers were generated consecutively, although zoned according to the corresponding registry. These first patents used a somewhat small typeface that made it difficult to read them at a certain distance, especially when faced with police requirements. Due to this inconvenience, in the mid-1970s a new format of larger patent plate began to be issued, where the characters were larger and in which the white box was also eliminated, as can be seen in the photograph on the right. Although this considerably changed and improved the appearance of the patent plates themselves, it did not modify the patent system at all and kept the same numerical sequence. This change was observed more quickly in the Federal Capital and some districts of Greater Buenos Aires, although the vast majority of sectional registries began to issue the new plates between the end of 1970 and the beginning of 1971.

However, between 1972 and 1973 many vehicles with the old format were also patented and re-patented, but they were issued by those sections with little registration activity that took much longer to exhaust the number series (from 200 to 500 numbers) assigned to them by the RNPA during 1970. The vast majority were small towns in the interior of the provinces or far from the big cities; this was gradually regularized when each registry mentioned began to issue a new assigned number series, already with the patent plates in the definitive format.

=== Patenting ===
Once the RNPA was created, the main objective of the new state body was to integrate the entire country under the same vehicle patenting system, but this task would require a large logistics organization, unprecedented until then, which had to be carefully planned to be carried out in different stages, which were the following:

- On Monday, June 1, 1964, the Federal Capital was the first district in the country designated to begin with the new patenting, being the only one to do so throughout the rest of that year, as the first step for the gradual and programmed insertion of the new automotive patenting system.
- The second step of the plan began in 1965 in the province of Buenos Aires, but for organizational reasons it was decided that the new patenting would be carried out initially in 17 districts of the Buenos Aires suburbs at that time (General Sarmiento was not included). nor Esteban Echeverría).
- Two years later, in July 1967, Mendoza, Neuquén and Salta were the next provinces that began to patent the new system.
- Between September and December 1969, the starting point for the new patenting was designated in the rest of the municipalities of the province of Buenos Aires, that is, those districts that made up the interior of the province. General Sarmiento and Esteban Echeverría also joined, since they were not included in Greater Buenos Aires in 1965.
- Finally, between 1968 and 1969 the rest of the provinces were incorporated.

This patenting scheme was valid until December 31, 1994, except for the province of Mendoza, which began with the current system of alphanumeric patents on December 1, 1994.

=== Repatents ===
However, the arduous task of repatenting the entire vehicle fleet that had not yet been incorporated, that is, those vehicles that did not manage to register from zero kilometers to the new system, still remained to be carried out. Mendoza, Neuquén and Salta were the first districts to start with mandatory repatenting as of January 2, 1968. Little more than two years later, in February 1970, when the rest of the provinces whose registries were already prepared and organized for issue the new patent plates, the mandatory re-registration of the rest of the vehicle fleet began. The repatents were programmed to reregister the entire remaining vehicle fleet from the newest to the oldest units, in that order. Each repatented year was set at a maximum period of 3 months, with the year 1973 as the limit to complete the entire process. However, a good number of vehicles received their new patent in later years, leaving very few cases of those that never did and the vast majority were abandoned units or that ended their existence as scrap.

The following list details chronologically how this stage was executed:

- Since 01/02/1968: registration of patented units prior to 1967 in the provinces of Mendoza, Neuquén and Salta.
- From 01/02/1970: re-registration of patented units prior to June 1, 1964, in the Federal Capital.
- Since 01/02/1970: re-registration of patented units prior to 1965 in Greater Buenos Aires (17 parties).
- Since 01/02/1970: re-registration of patented units prior to 1969 or 1970 (depending on the district) in the rest of the province of Buenos Aires (104 districts).
- From 01/02/1970: re-registration of patented units prior to 1968 or 1969 (depending on the province) in the rest of the country.

There were no special numbers or series to identify the repatented units, contrary to what happens today, since they were shared at the same time with the new units. This explained the non-relationship of the model of a much older automobile with respect to the year of issuance of its new patent. To cite just one example: in 1972 it was very common to find the license plate number of a zero kilometer Ford Falcon that was close to, followed by or before the license plate number of a 1947 Chevrolet, among thousands and thousands of other cases.

== 1972-1994: Identifying the provinces ==
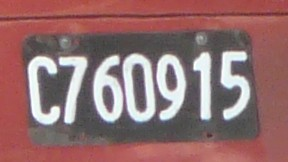
Typical Argentine registration plate, 1972-1994 format

In 1972 the national government standardized the plates, the format being one letter and six digits, with embossed characters painted white against a black background. The letter identified the issuing province (or city, in the case of Buenos Aires), with the numbers issued consecutively in each jurisdiction. The letter usually was the first letter of the province's name, but for multiple provinces beginning with the same letters, some provinces were issued other letters (such as X for Córdoba, P for Formosa, A for Salta, Q for Neuquen and N for Misiones); this standard is still used in the ISO 3166-2:AR geocode.

Code	Subdivision name
C	Ciudad Autónoma de Buenos Aires
B	Buenos Aires
K	Catamarca
H	Chaco
U	Chubut
X	Córdoba
W	Corrientes
E	Entre Ríos
P	Formosa
Y	Jujuy
L	La Pampa
F	La Rioja
M	Mendoza
N	Misiones
Q	Neuquén
R	Río Negro
A	Salta
J	San Juan
D	San Luis
Z	Santa Cruz
S	Santa Fe
G	Santiago del Estero
V	Tierra del Fuego
T	Tucumán

=== Passing the million ===
The only two districts to exceed one million license plates issued were the province of Buenos Aires (in 1973 it exceeded one million and in 1984 two million) and the Federal Capital (in 1980 it reached one million). As the original format contemplated only six digits, a conflict was unexpectedly generated by incorporating another new digit using the same plate format and its typography, but the issue was quickly resolved by moving the province identification letter a little upwards and adding a number extra below it representing just the unit of a million.

== 1995-2016: A national standard ==
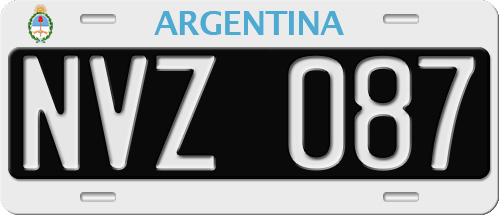
Typical Argentine registration plate, 1995-2016 format

In 1994 the government decreed that all vehicles sold on or after January 1, 1995, were to have a new license plate design, used vehicles would get new plates upon re-sale after that date, and all other vehicles would be issued with new plates in stages.

The new design consists of three letters followed by three digits, and removes any clues identifying the vehicle's province of origin. This was advertised as a federalist move from the government.

In a move to simplify the transition, all plates issued to vehicles sold prior to the cut-off date started with the letter R (and successively S, T, U, V, W, and part of the X series), while vehicles being registered for the first time received plates in a series starting alphabetically with AAA 000. The lettering is impressed in white on a black background. The plates also have a white frame with the word Argentina at the top, screened in light blue. All materials are reflective, to improve visibility on the road. Some plates feature a small "D" or "T" between the letters and the numbers, denoting that this plate is a duplicate or triplicate when the previous plate or plates had been damaged, lost or stolen.

In some provinces, unofficial stickers, with the province name printed in the same type and size of the word "Argentina", were issued and sold to be added to the bottom edge of the plate, as a way to identify the province (as in the old plate pattern). This system, however, did not become popular and was rarely used.

== Limits of the system ==
The 3-letter-plus-3-digit code allows for 26^{3} × 10^{3} = 17,576,000 license plates. RAA-000 to ZZZ-999 were reserved for older vehicles. Since 1995, new licenses have been issued starting from AAA-000. In July 2005, new cars have licenses starting with F, while about the same month in 2004, license plates started with E. An efficient solution would be to add a fourth letter, which will increase the system's capacity by a factor of 26, to 456,976,000 vehicles (a fourth number would only increase it tenfold to 175,760,000 licenses). In August 2008, new cars had plates starting with HK. As of 2009, the series has reached the mid I series. In January 2015 the series had reached already the O series.

Evolution of lettering (starts January 1, 1995)

- Jan 1st, 1995 - AA-
- Jan 1st, 1996 - AP-
- Jan 1st, 1997 - BD-
- Jan 1st, 1998 - BV-
- Jan 1st, 1999 - CO-
- Jan 1st, 2000 - DC-
- Jan 1st, 2001 - DQ-
- Jan 1st, 2002 - DX-
- Jan 1st, 2003 - EC-
- Jan 1st, 2004 - EH-
- Jan 1st, 2005 - ET-
- Jan 1st, 2006 - FI-
- Jan 1st, 2007 - GA-
- Jan 1st, 2008 - GV-
- Jan 1st, 2009 - HU-
- Jan 1st, 2010 - IN-
- Jan 1st, 2011 - JN-
- Jan 1st, 2012 - KU-
- Jan 1st, 2013 - LZ-
- Jan 1st, 2014 - NM-
- Jan 1st, 2015 - ON-
- Jan 1st, 2016 - PM-

According to first letter start:

- A - JAN 1995
- B - OCT 1996
- C - MAR 1998
- D - NOV 1999
- E - MAY 2002
- F - JUN 2005
- G - DEC 2006
- H - FEB 2008
- I - APR 2009
- J - JUL 2010
- K - MAY 2011
- L - FEB 2012
- M - JAN 2013
- N - AUG 2013
- O - JUL 2014
- P - JUL 2015

== From 2016: Mercosur standard ==
In October 2014 the design of the new license plate to be used by all Mercosur countries was officially presented. It consists of a plate of 400 mm × 130 mm (15.75 in × 5.12 in), with a white background, the characters and frame in black and a blue band at the top that shows the name of the country, its flag and the Mercosur logo. The typeface used is FE-Schrift, notably one of the security features of the new license plates is a map of the Falklands in the background of the plate.

In Argentina, the serial format is AA 000 AA, allowing a total of 450 million combinations. The system started with AA 000 AA, AA 000 AB ... AA 000 AZ, AA 000 BA... AA 000 ZZ, AA 001 AA... By January 2017, there were plates with license numbers as high as AA 950 AA. It is expected the AB series to start in February 2017. Series AC started in December 2017, while AD started in November 2018. As of April 2019, the highest number is AD530.

== Other types ==
Image	Type	Serial format	Design
	Diplomatic Corps	CD 1234 or CD-1234	black on white; longer plate size; variety of manufacturing styles
	Diplomatic Corps	D123xxA	
	Consular corps	CC-1234	orange on teal; "Rep. Argentina" legend; longer plate size
	Consular corps	C123xxA	
	Special missions	ME-1234	orange on teal; "Rep. Argentina" legend; longer plate size
	Special missions	M123xxA	
	International organization	OI-1234	orange on teal; "Rep. Argentina" legend; longer plate size
	International organization	I123xxA	
	Non-diplomatic embassy staff (personal auxiliar)	PA-1234	orange on teal; "Rep. Argentina" legend; longer plate size
	Non-diplomatic embassy staff (personal auxiliar)	A123xxA	
	Motorcycle	123/ABC	Until 2010. White on black; vertically at left is one-letter province code over a horizontal line over "RNPA".
	Motorcycle	123 ABC	Starting in 2010.
	Registro Nacional de la Patente Automotor	ABC 12	white on black; "RNPA" and "Republica Argentina" legends
	Temporary	RAB-1234 possibly UAB-1234	red on white; made of paper
	Trailer	101 ABC 123; alpha-numeric sequence matches that of primary mover	same design as standard plate but with narrower serial characters
	Transporte Nacional de Cargas	ABC 123	teal on yellow, more square plate; currently obsolete

=== Approximate evolution of current patenting year by year ===
Note: relative data, since the combinations may vary according to the sectional registry that issued them and therefore the third letter of each combination is not included, since they do not all coincide on the same dates.

Date	Combination
January 1995	AB_
January 1996	AN_
January 1997	BD_
January 1998	BU_
January 1999	CN_
January 2000	DC_
January 2001	DP_
January 2002	DX_
January 2003	ED_
January 2004	EJ_
January 2005	EU_
January 2006	FI_
January 2007	GB_
January 2008	GV_
January 2009	HU_
January 2010	IM_
January 2011	JN_
January 2012	KV_
January 2013	MC_
January 2014	NM_
January 2015	ON_
January 2016	PM_

=== Mercosur system ===
Date	Combination
April 1, 2016	AA000AA
February 2017	AB000AA
November 2017	AC000AA
July 2018	AD000AA
October 2019	AE000AA
August 2021	AF000AA
April 2023	AG000AA
November 2024	AH000AA
December 2025	AI000AA

=== Approximate start dates of each main letter ===
Note: relative data, given that the combinations may vary according to the sectional registry that issued them and therefore they do not all coincide on the same dates.

Letter	Date / Usage
A	December 1994
B	September 1996
C	February 1998
D	October 1999
E	April 2002
F	June 2005
G	December 2006
H	February 2008
I	April 2009
J	July 2010
K	May 2011
L	February 2012
M	December 2012
N	August 2013
O	July 2014
P	July 2015
Q	The eventual use is reserved
R	For vehicles prior to the implementation of the system
S	For vehicles prior to the implementation of the system
T	For vehicles prior to the implementation of the system
U	For vehicles prior to the implementation of the system
V	For vehicles prior to the implementation of the system
W	For vehicles prior to the implementation of the system
X	For vehicles prior to the implementation of the system
Y	Unassigned
Z	Unassigned

== Sources ==
- clarin.com - Las claves de las nuevas patentes para vehículos del Mercosur
- dnrpa.gov.ar - Patente Unica del Mercosur
