= Subdivisions of Buenos Aires =

The city of Buenos Aires is formally divided in 48 barrios (neighborhoods), grouped into 15 comunas (communes), which are defined as "units of decentralized political and administrative management governed by designated residents".

The city proper (excluding the suburbs and exurbs that form Greater Buenos Aires), had 2,891,082 inhabitants as of 2010.

== Overview ==
English name	Spanish name	Time of first occurrence	Quantity at time of first occurrence	Relation to other types
Parishes	Parroquias	1622	1	
Police sections	Secciones policiales/comisarías	1778		
Neighborhoods	Barrios	1794		
Census divisions	Divisiones censales	1869.		
Electoral sections	Secciones electorales	1877		Aligned with the boundaries of the communes. "las secciones electorales se ajustaron a las comunas"
School districts	Distritos escolares	1884.		
CGP	CGP	1996.	16	
Communes	Comunas	2005.	15	Grouping of several neighborhoods.
Sanitary regions	Régiones sanitarias	2008.	4	Grouping several communes.

== Sanitary regions ==
The borders of the sanitary regions are aligned with the borders of the communes.

- Region 1: C1, C3, C4
- Region 2: C7, C8, C9
- Region 3: C5, C6, C10, C11, C15
- Region 4: C2, C12, C13, C14
