= Beruti, Buenos Aires =

Beruti
- Town
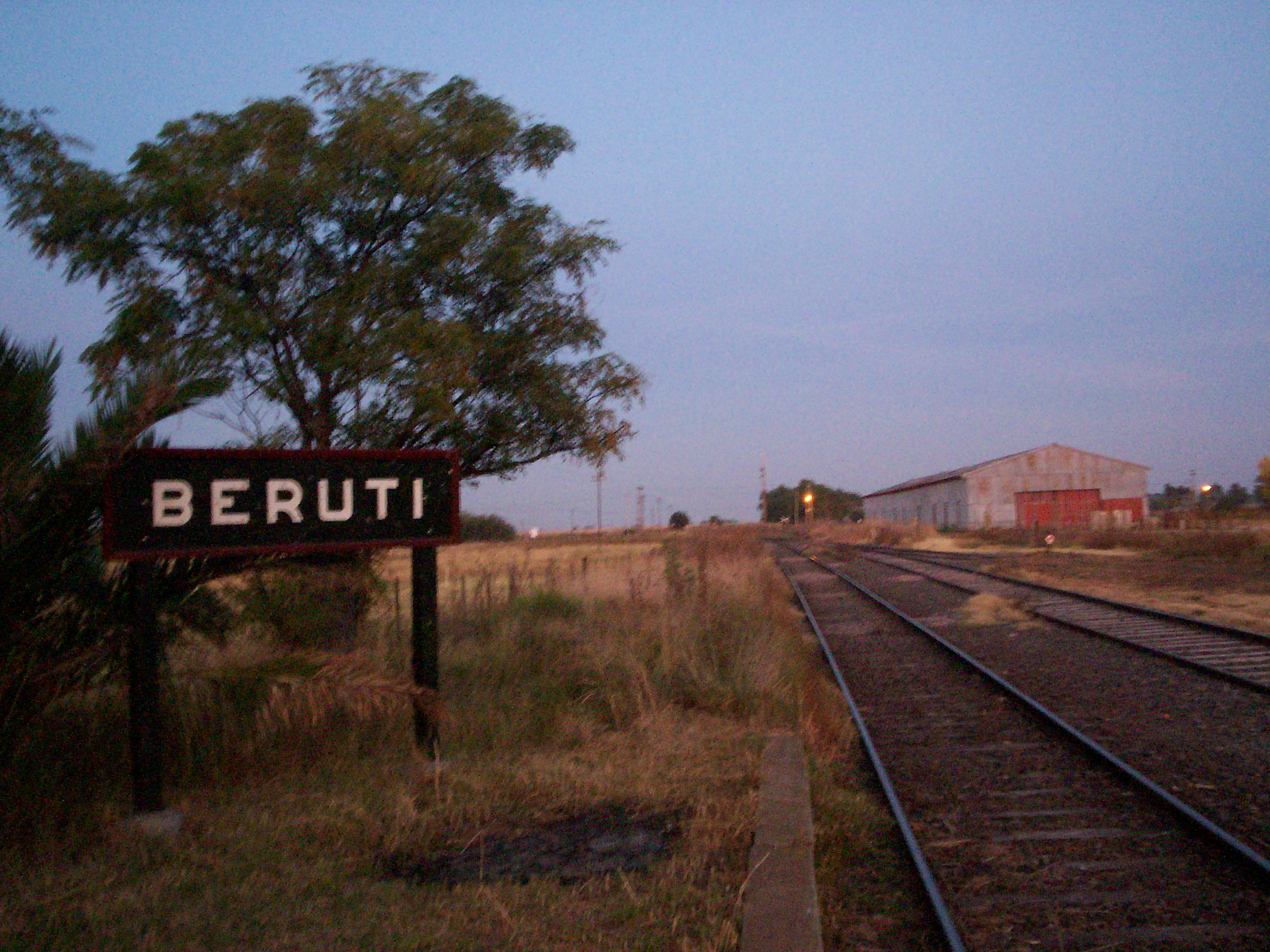
- Rail station

- Location within Buenos Aires Province
- Coordinates: 35°52′S 62°30′W
- Country: Argentina
- Province: Buenos Aires
- Partidos: Trenque Lauquen
- Established: August 25, 1890
- Elevation: 77 m (253 ft)

Population (2001 Census)
  - Total: 874
- Time zone: UTC−3 (ART)
- CPA Base: B 6424
- Climate: Dfc

Beruti is a town located in the Trenque Lauquen Partido in the province of Buenos Aires, Argentina.

== Name ==
The town was named for Antonio Beruti, who participated in the May Revolution, part of the Argentine War of Independence. Upon founding, the town was erroneously spelled "Berutti". In 2020, the town was renamed to correct the error.

== History ==
A rail station run by the Ferrocarril Oeste was established on August 25, 1890, connecting the town with Trenque Lauquen and Nueve de Julio.

In 1987, Beruti suffered a major flood which nearly destroyed the town.

== Economy ==
The town was formerly home to a large textile factory which employed roughly 400. It opened in 1935 and closed in the 1990s.

== Population ==
According to INDEC, which collects population data for the country, the town had a population of 874 people as of the 2001 census.
