= Beruti =

Beruti may refer to:

- Antonio Beruti (1772-1841), Argentine revolutionary
- 3179 Beruti, a minor planet
- Beruti, Buenos Aires, a town in Argentina
