= Treinta de Agosto =

- Town
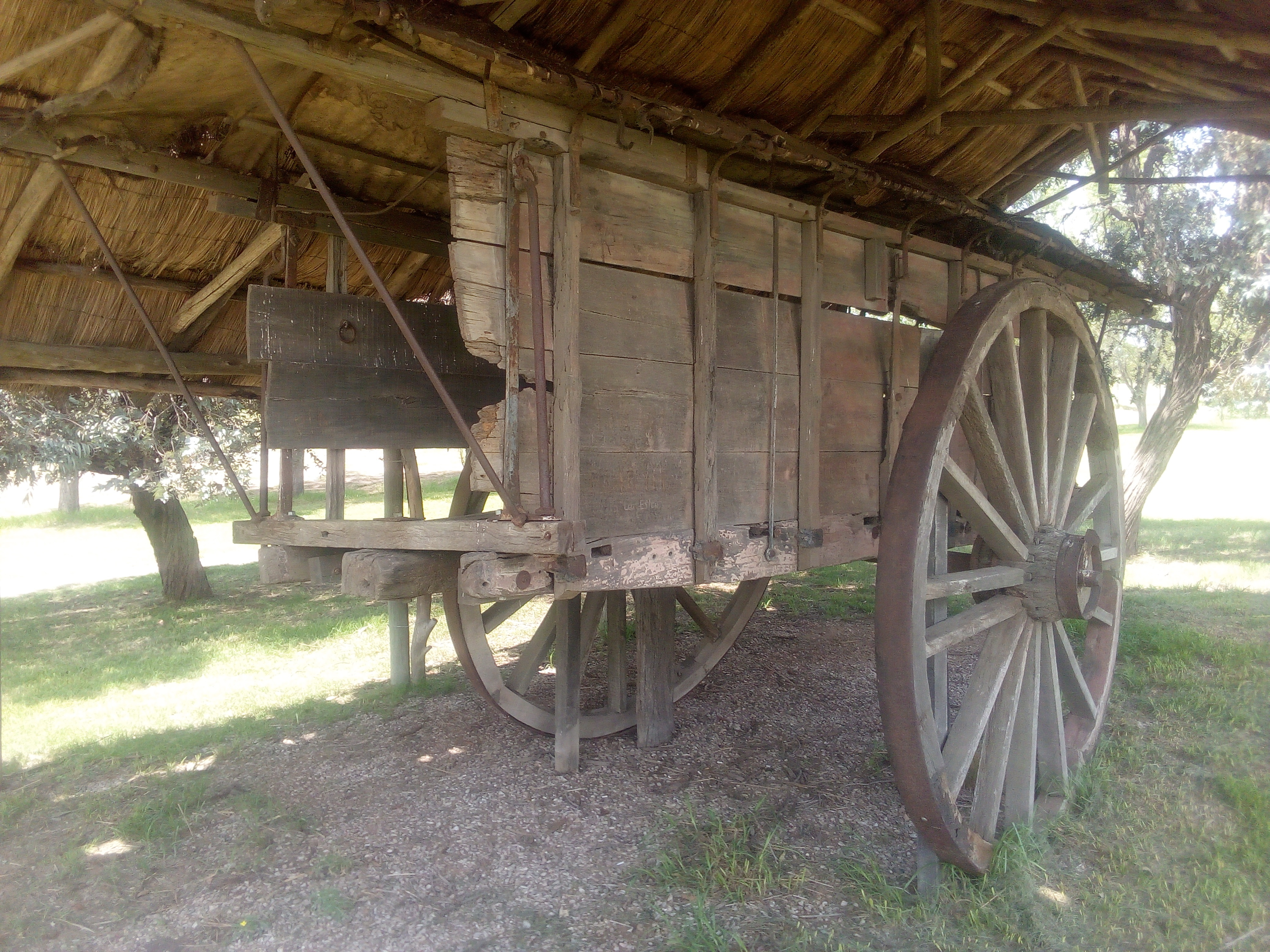

- Location within Buenos Aires Province
- Coordinates: 36°16′S 62°33′W
- Country: Argentina
- Province: Buenos Aires
- Partidos: Trenque Lauquen
- Established: 1910
- Elevation: 104 m (341 ft)

Population (2001 Census)
  - Total: 4,204
- Time zone: UTC−3 (ART)
- CPA Base: B 6405
- Climate: Dfc

Treinta de Agosto is a town located in the Trenque Lauquen Partido in the province of Buenos Aires, Argentina.

== History ==
Rail service under the Buenos Aires Western Railway began in 1857. The land planned for the town was built in 1908, lots were sold in October 1910, and the town's founding was approved in March 31, 1911.

== Population ==
According to INDEC, which collects population data for the country, the town had a population of 4,204 people as of the 2001 census.
