= Once railway station =

Railway station in Buenos Aires, Argentina

11th of September Once de Septiembre
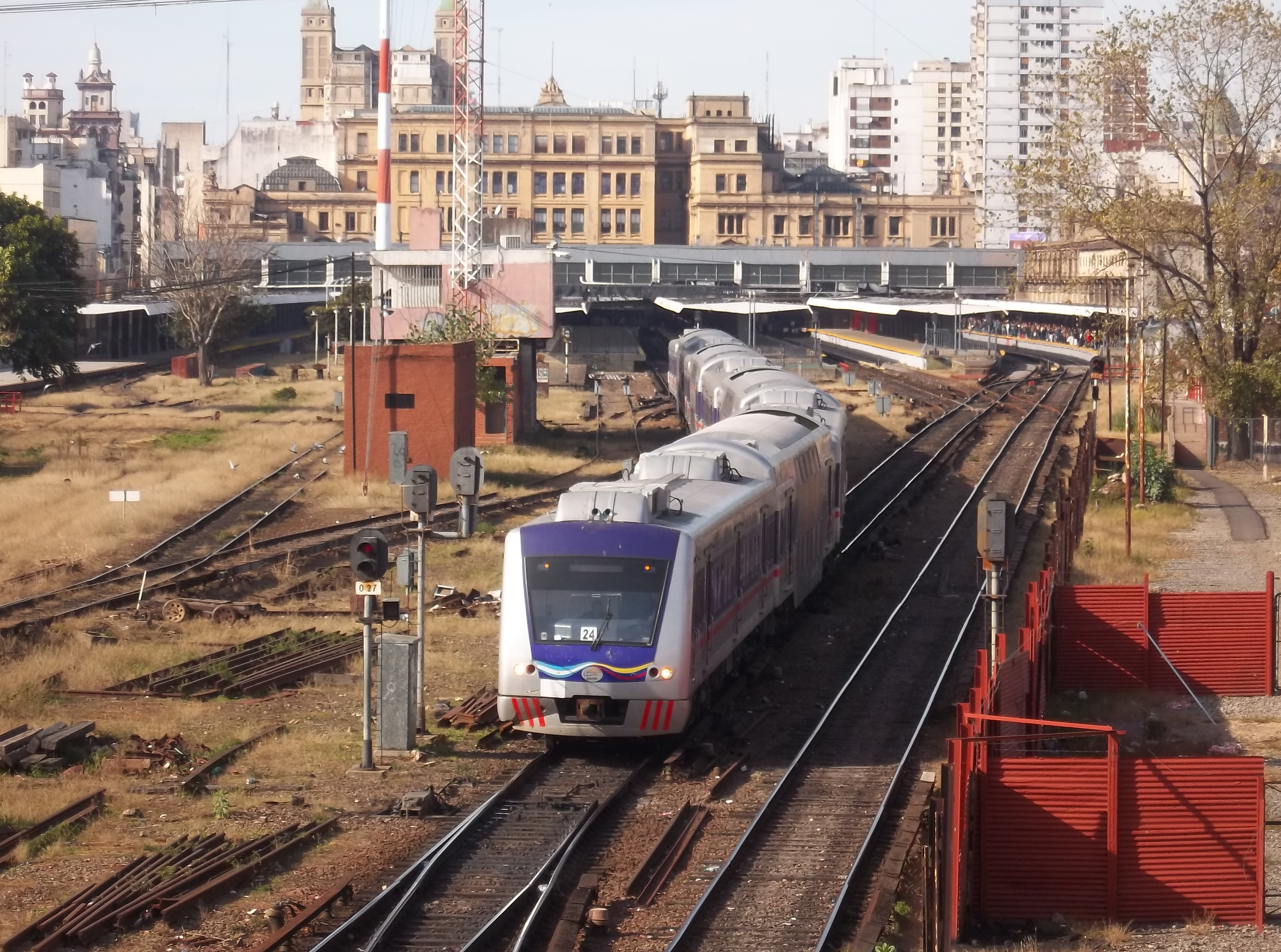
- Station building

General information
- Location: Pueyrredón Avenue and B. Mitre, Buenos Aires; Argentina
- Coordinates: 34°36′31″S 58°24′32″W
- System: Commuter rail
- Owner: Government of Argentina
- Operator: Trenes Argentinos
- Platforms: 7
- Tracks: 8
- Connections: Underground

History
- Opened: 20 December 1882; 143 years ago
- Electrified: Third rail

National Historic Monument of Argentina
Location

Once railway station (Spanish: Estación Once de Septiembre, lit. 'Eleventh of September Station', Latin American Spanish: [ˈonse]; informally known as Spanish: Estación Once, lit. 'Eleventh Station') is a large railway terminus in central Buenos Aires, Argentina, in the barrio of Balvanera.

The station, inaugurated on 20 December 1882, is located in the barrio of Balvanera, immediately north of Plaza Miserere, a large public square. The current terminal, designed by the Dutch architect John Doyer in Renaissance Revival style, was built in two stages, from 1895 to 1898, and then from 1906 to 1907.

The station is named after the 11 September 1852 rebellion of Buenos Aires against the federal government of Justo José de Urquiza. Contrary to popular belief, the station is not named after the death of the president Domingo Faustino Sarmiento on 11 September 1888.

== History ==
=== Background and first buildings ===
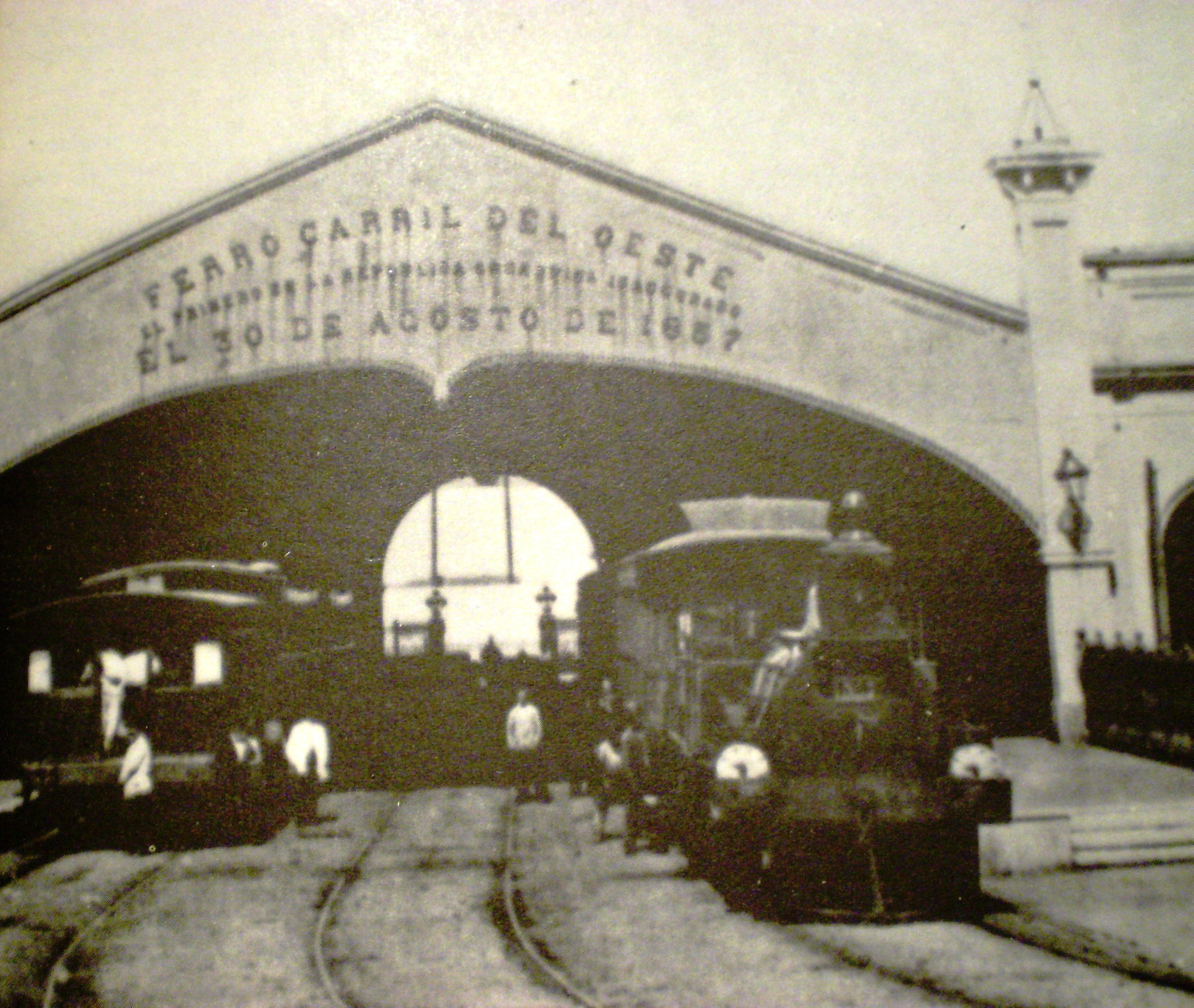
The original terminus of the Buenos Aires Western Railway, the Del Parque railway station

In 1853, a group of entrepreneurs from the upper class of Buenos Aires formed the Society of the Iron Road from Buenos Aires to the West (Spanish: Sociedad del Camino de Hierro de Buenos Aires al Oeste), which would lead to the construction of the first railway line in Argentina. Opened in August 1857, the Buenos Aires Western Railway (Spanish: Ferrocarril Oeste de Buenos Aires) joined central Buenos Aires to the Floresta station, which at that time was located in San José de Flores village, but is now within Buenos Aires city limits as the Flores district of Buenos Aires, through a 10 km (6.2 mi) long railway line. The original eastern terminus of the Buenos Aires Western Railway was the Del Parque railway station (located where currently Plaza Lavalle is located), with the first intermediate stop on the railway line heading west being named "Once de Septiembre". As a consequence, that first Once de Septiembre station was a modest building made of wood and placed on Bartolomé Mitre street. It had only one platform and some warehouses to store wood and other materials.

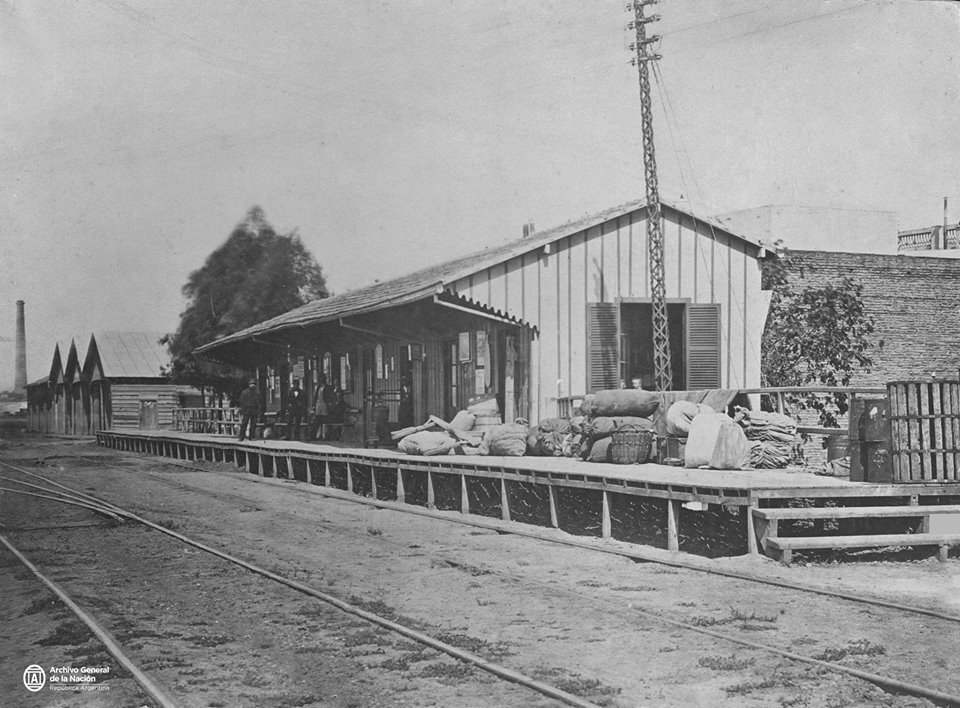
The old Once station in 1890.

In 1873, the Government considered moving the terminus of the railway line from Del Parque to Once station as a consequence of the increasing growth of Buenos Aires and in the area between both stations due to mass immigration to Argentina. The continuous expansion of Buenos Aires produced a growth of road traffic with a large number of trams and carriages, and the rail tracks crossed along streets and avenues (such as Corrientes) with high vehicle and pedestrians traffic. In April 1878, the Municipality of Buenos Aires thus promulgated by decree the closing of the Once–Del Parque section of the railway line, as well as the moving of the terminal station to Once, though it did not take effect until 1883. A new station building was built for that purpose, an unassuming clapboard structure, which was inaugurated on 1 January 1883. Like the previous station, the building was made of wood, but nonetheless bigger than the previous one.

By the 1890s new groups of immigrants established near Once station.

=== Current station building ===
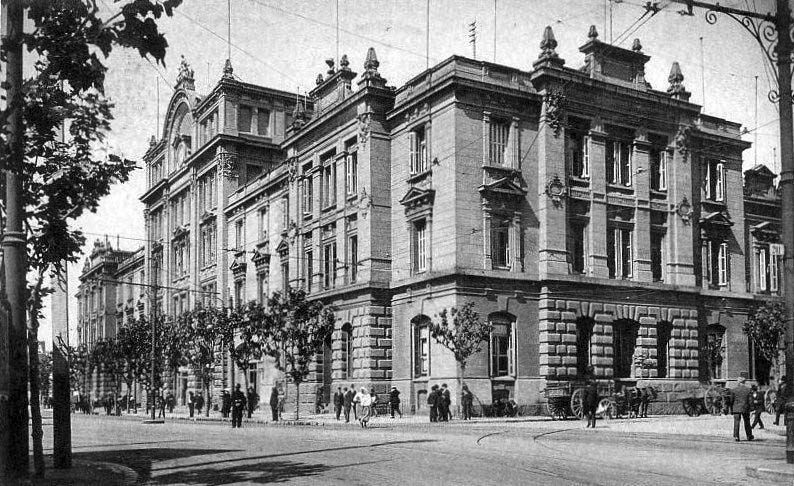
Photo of the station, c. 1910.

The original terminal was ordered to be replaced by larger facilities following its 1890 purchase by the Buenos Aires Western Railway. Designed by the Dutch architect John Doyer, the new Renaissance Revival terminal was built in two stages, from 1895 to 1898, and then from 1906 to 1907; refurbishment works completed in 1972 removed most of the terminal's ornate, cast-iron roof trusses (though these are still visible in the adjoining subway station).

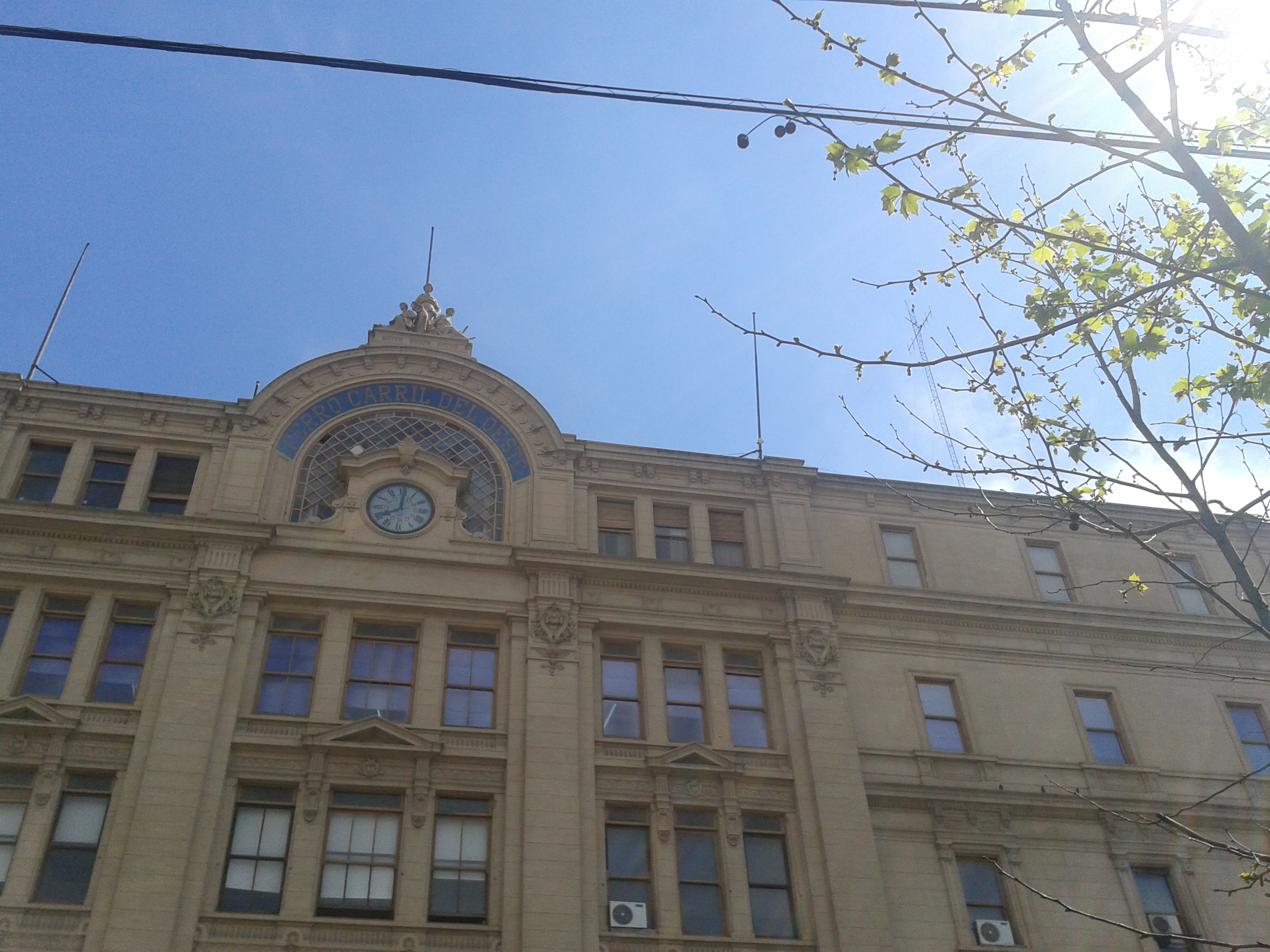
From 2007 to 2008 the facade of the station and other dependencies underwent a thorough restoration.

In 1913, Once station was the first railway terminal in Buenos Aires to be connected to the Buenos Aires Underground network, as the first underground line in the city was opened, the current Line A of the Subterráneo de Buenos Aires between Plaza de Mayo and Plaza Once.

=== Rail accidents ===
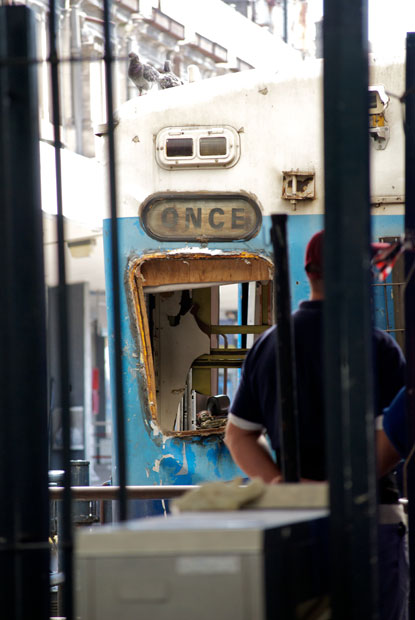
The train after crashing in 2012.

On 22 February 2012, a commuter train entered Once station traveling at an excessive speed, about 26 km/h, and crashed into the buffers at the end of the line, killing 51 people and injuring at least 703.

A similar, though less severe, incident took place on the morning of 19 October 2013, when a commuter train crashed into the buffers and landed on the platform above. Passengers reported that the conductor was speeding from Caballito Station (the previous stop); a crowd of passengers surrounded the control booth following the crash yelling "murderer", though the conductor had already fled. The conductor, Julio Benítez, was arrested after he was found with the train event recorder hidden in his backpack; Benítez had attempted to destroy the device.

=== Heritage ===
In May 2021, the station was declared National Historic Monument, along with other terminal stations such as Retiro (Belgrano), Constitución, and Federico Lacroze.

== Services ==
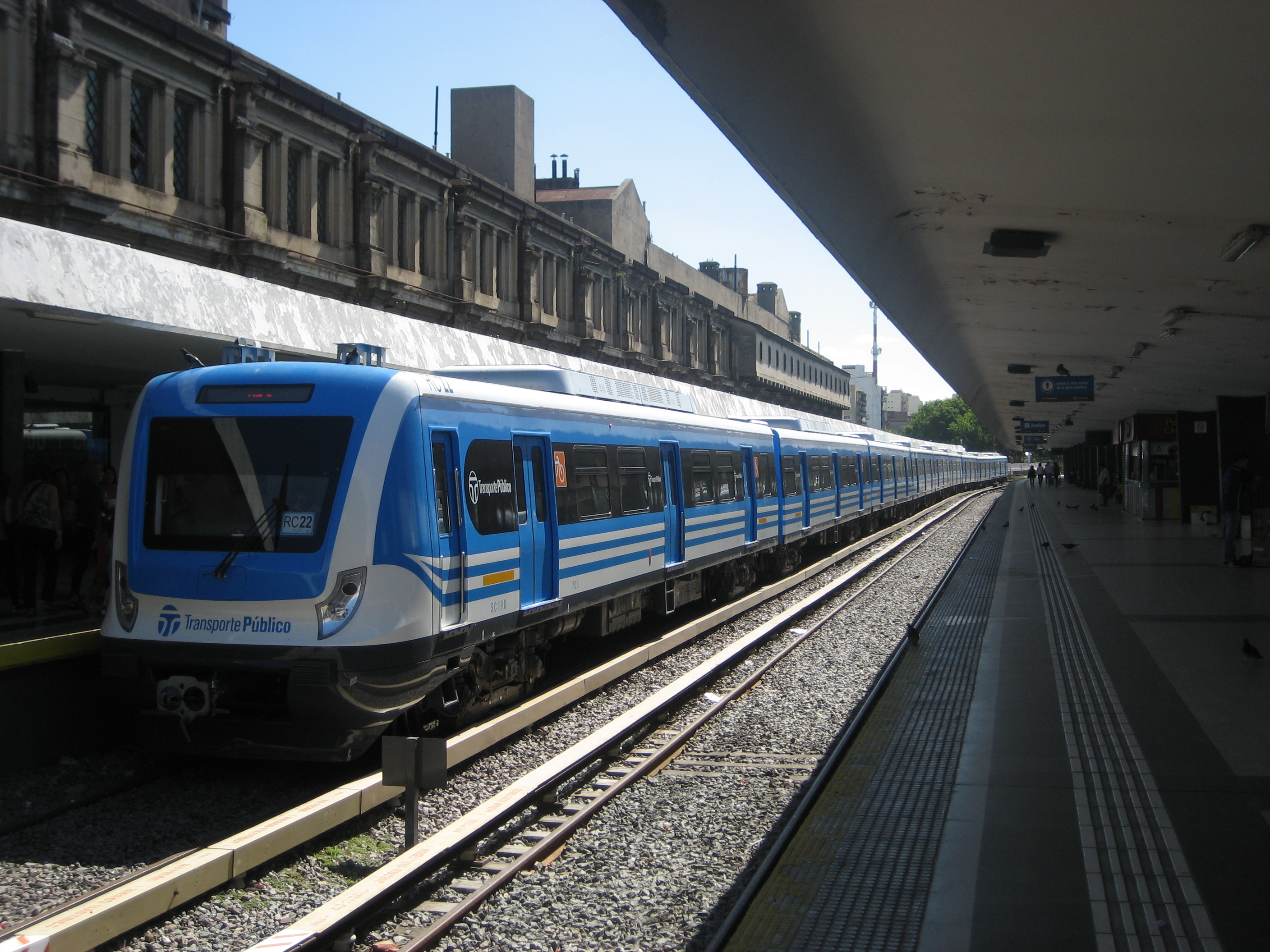
A Sarmiento Line Trenes Argeninos train at the station in 2015.

Estación Once handles both long-distance and local passenger trains. The publicly owned provincial railway company Ferrobaires operates trains over four principal rail lines which fan out west over the surrounding Buenos Aires Province. Destinations include Pehuajó, Bragado, Bahia Blanca and points between.

Additionally, the commuter rail State-owned company Trenes Argentinos S.E. operates a regular train service to the suburbs of Buenos Aires along the branches of its Sarmiento Line to destinations including Moreno, Luján, Lobos, and Mercedes. The station is accessible by numerous public bus services and by the A line of the Buenos Aires Underground via its "Plaza Miserere" station. Estación Once underwent extensive renovations prior to 2007, when the new H line of the metro reached the heavily transited terminal.

== Historic operators ==
Operator	Period
(United Kingdom) Buenos Aires Western Railway	1882–1948
(Argentina) Ferrocarriles Argentinos	1948–1991
(Argentina) FEMESA (Note: Temporary operator prior to the privatization of commuter rail services.)	1991–1994
(Argentina) TBA	1995–2012
(Argentina) UGOMS (Note: Temporary operator after the government revoked concession to Metropolitano.)	2012–2014
(Argentina) Corredores Ferroviarios	2014–2015
(Argentina) Trenes Argentinos	2015–present

== Gallery ==
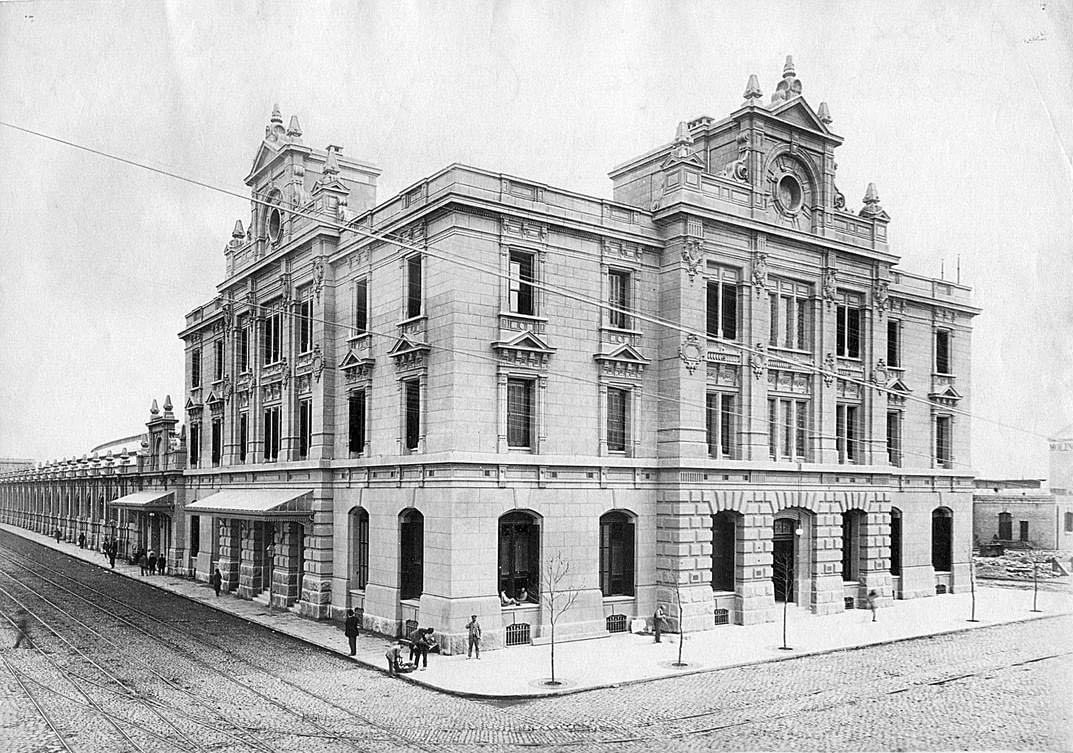
The current building c. 1890s

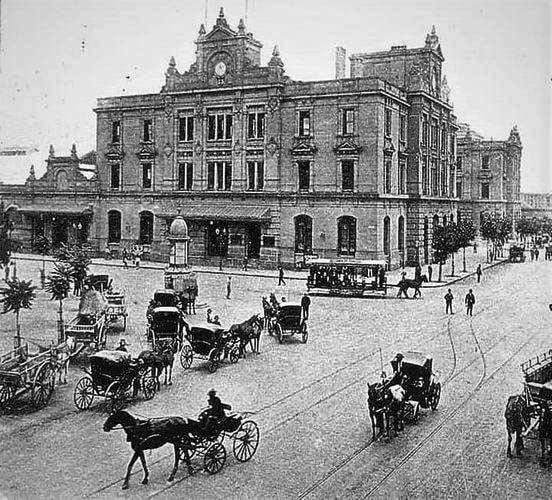
Once station, c. 1900

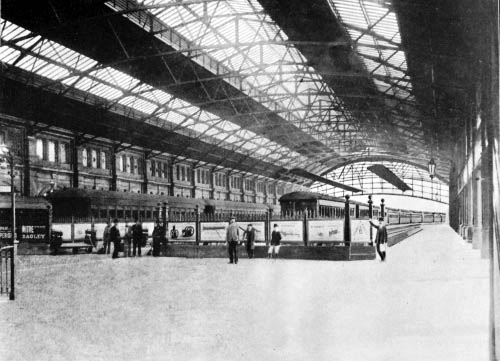
Interior and platforms c. 1910

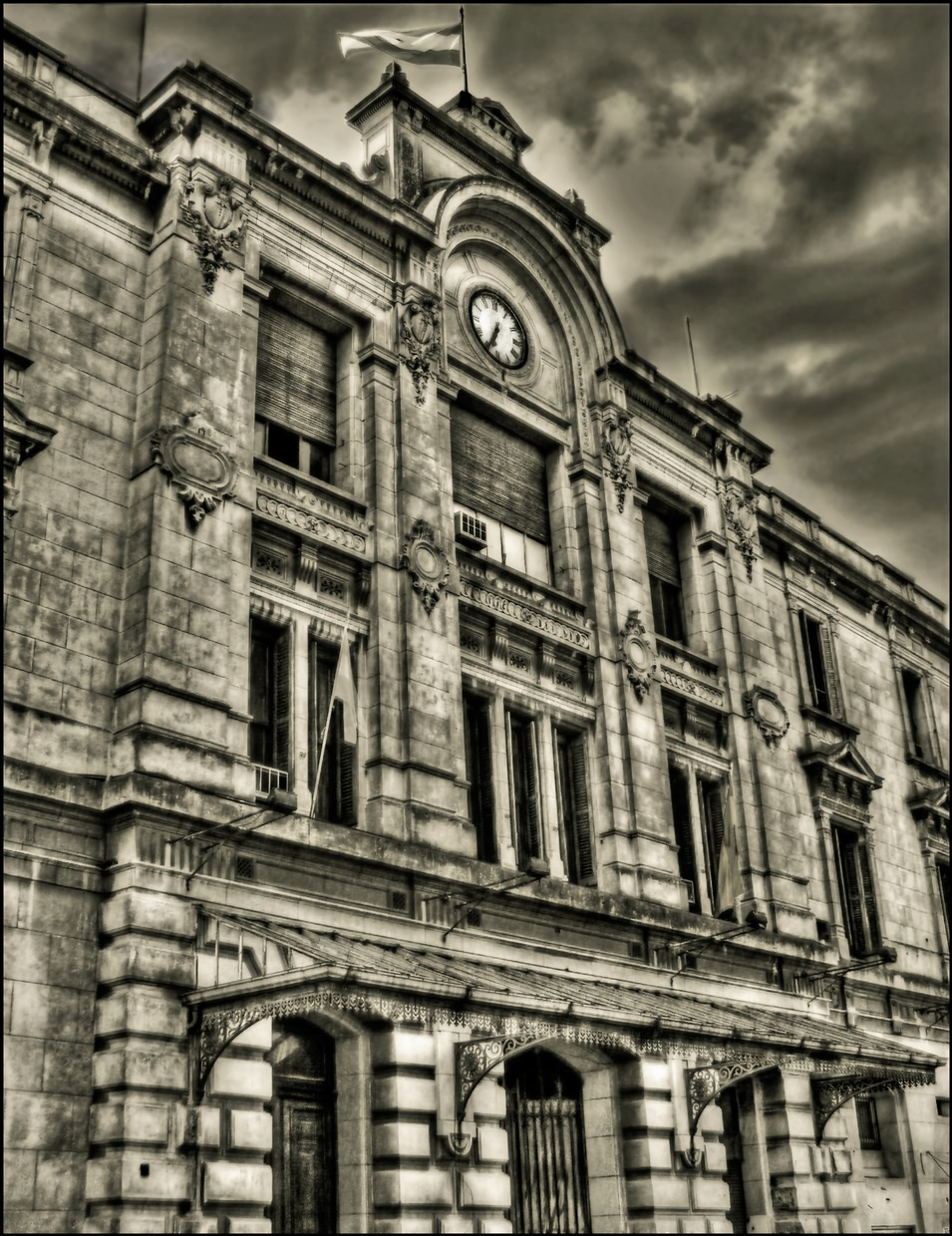
Building facade, 2007

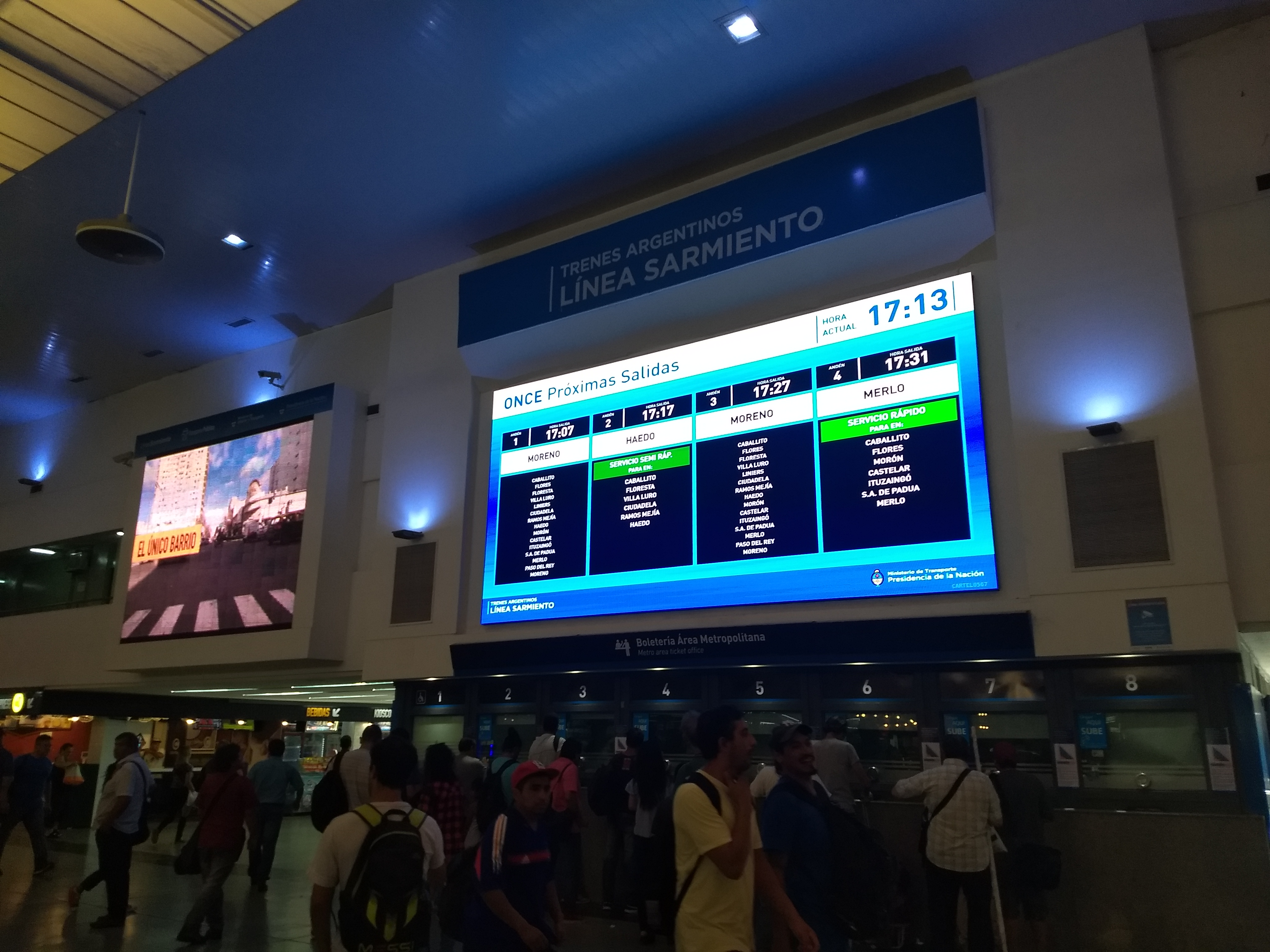
Interior of the station building with ticket office and schedule board

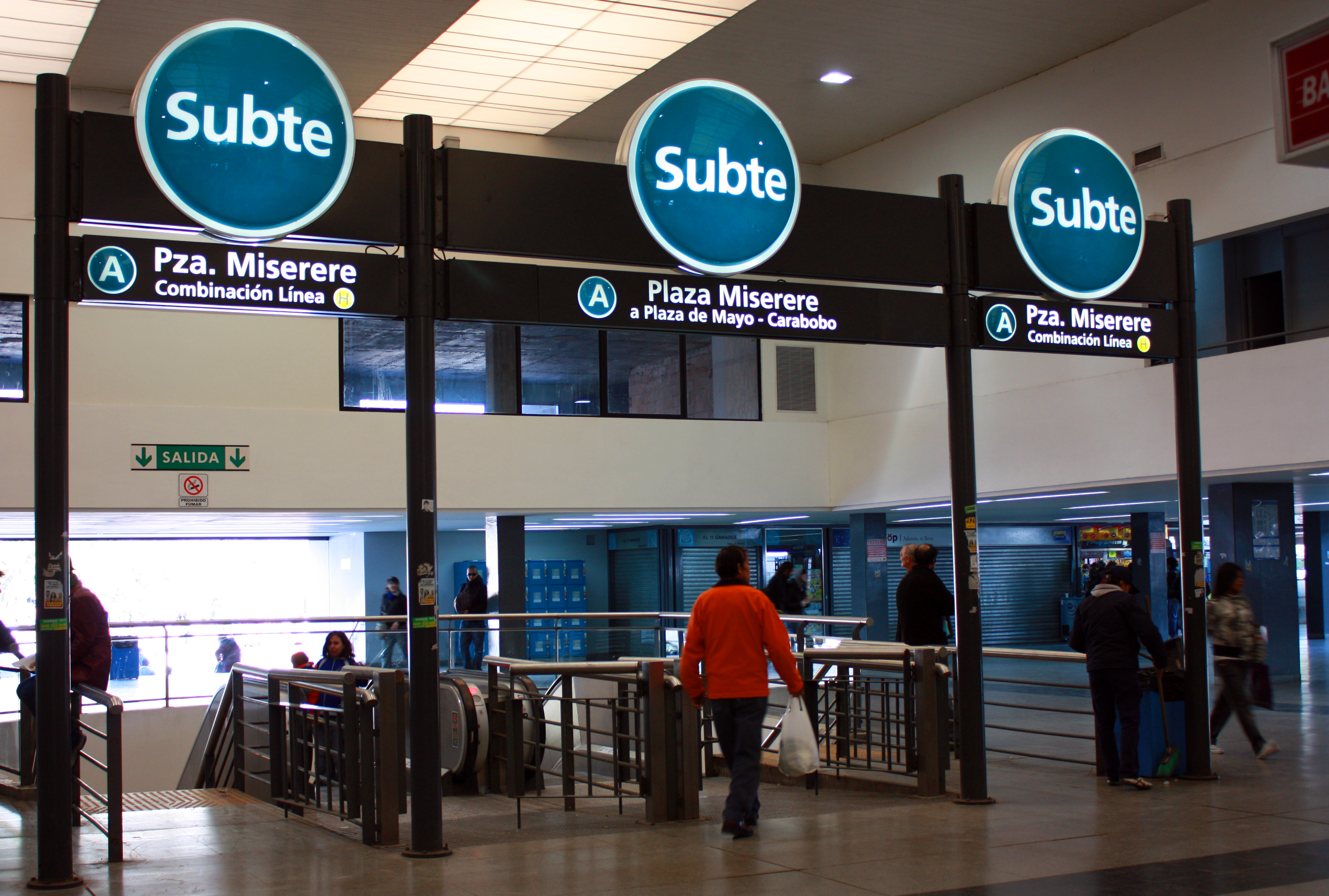
Entrance to Line A of the Buenos Aires Underground

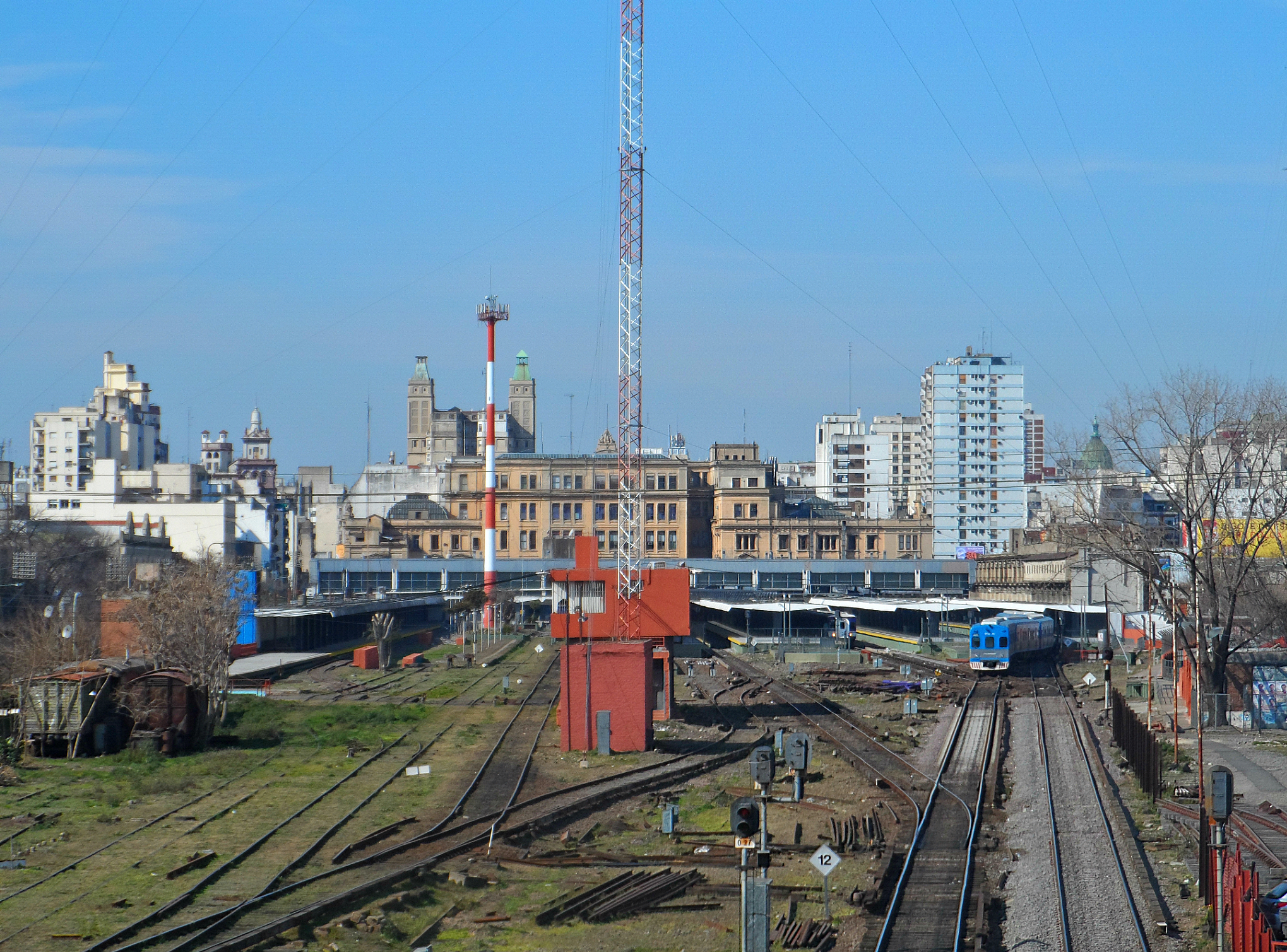
Panoramic view of the station in 2013

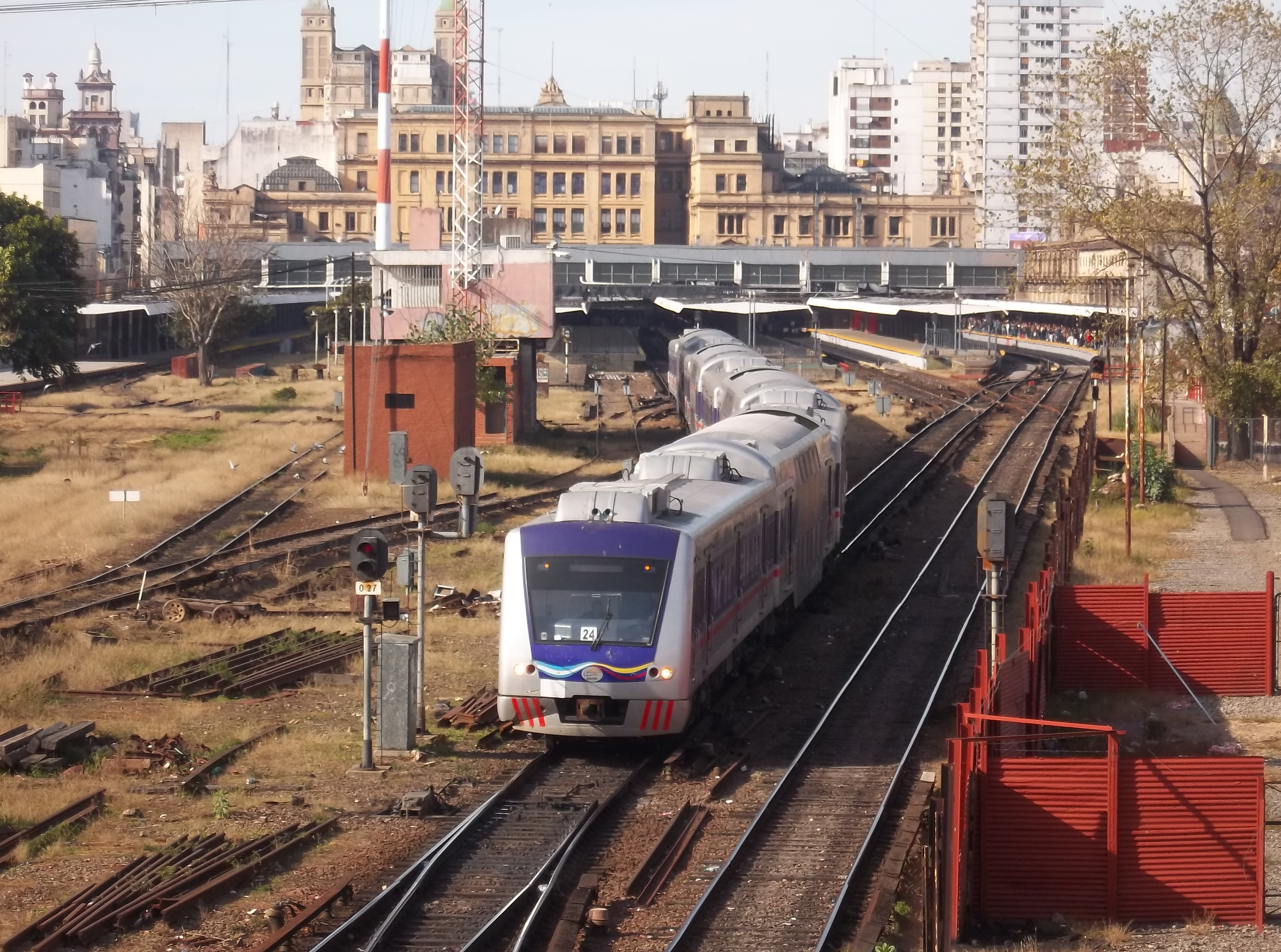
A Trenes de Buenos Aires train leaving the station in 2012, prior to the company's nationalisation

== See also ==
- Balvanera
- Del Parque railway station
