= Del Parque railway station =

Former railway station in Buenos Aires, Argentina

Del Parque
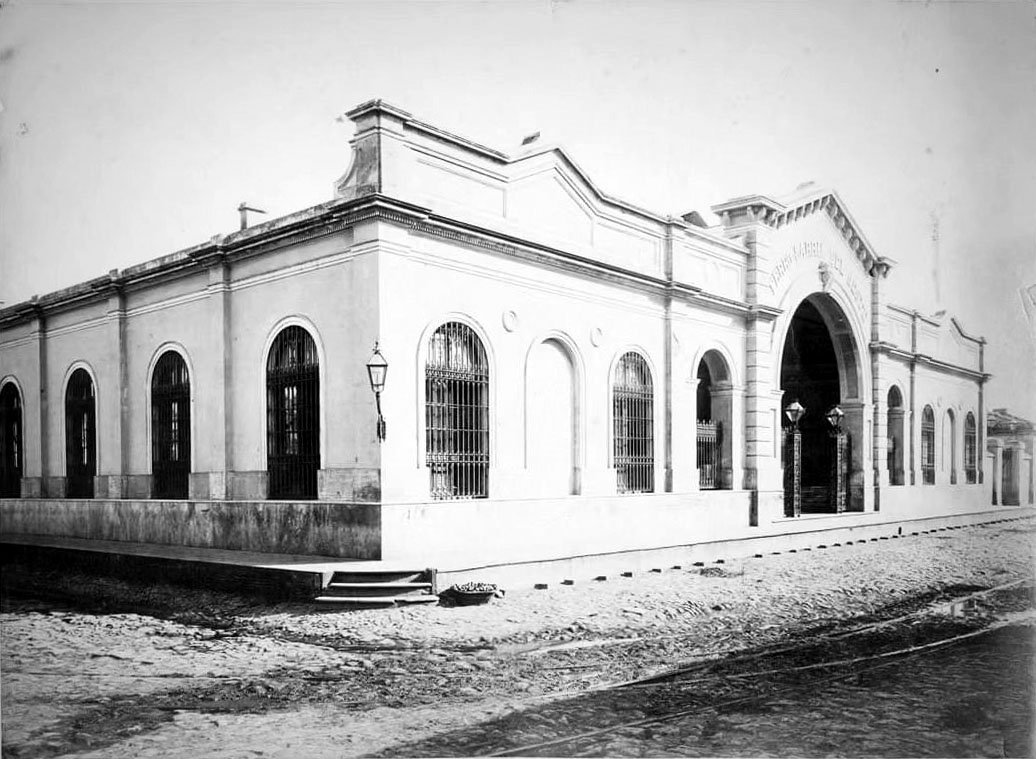
- Main facade of the station

General information
- Location: Cerrito and Tucumán, Buenos Aires; Argentina
- Coordinates: 34.601°S 58.383°W
- System: Commuter rail
- Owner: Government of Argentina
- Operator: Buenos Aires Western Railway
- Line: Buenos Aires Western Railway
- Tracks: 5
- Connections: Horse carriages

Construction
- Platform levels: 2

History
- Opened: 1857
- Closed: 1883; 143 years ago
Location

Del Parque is a former train station in Buenos Aires, Argentina. It was the first railway station in the country, serving as terminus of Buenos Aires Western Railway. The station was located at the intersection of Cerrito and Tucumán streets.

Del Parque operated for over 27 years until it was closed due to the high pedestrian traffic in the area where the station was located. Long distance services to the cities of Bragado and Lobos departed from the station.

== History ==
In 1854 the province of Buenos Aires granted concession to local consortium "Sociedad Camino de Hierro de Buenos Aires al Oeste" to build the first railway line in Argentina, starting in Buenos Aires. After several projects were studied, it was decided that the terminal station would be built in front of the "Plaza del Parque" (currently Plaza Lavalle) that stayed closer to the Argentine Army Artillery Park.

The station building was placed on the block around Cerrito, Tucumán, Libertad and Viamonte streets, which was a low-traffic area at the time. After several attempts, the train finally made its inaugural trip on 29 August 1857 from the Parque station, carrying notable people of the time such as Valentín Alsina, Bartolomé Mitre, Domingo Sarmiento and Dalmacio Vélez Sársfield. After a brief stop at San José de Flores, the train arrived at Floresta, the terminal station of the line.

Del Parque station was opened to the public on the following day, running two trains per day, with the night service depending on moonlight to operate. Two classes were available, first class (at a cost of AR$10) and second class (AR$5). From the time of its opening onwards, the railway line increased its number of passengers.

In 1873 the Government considered moving the terminus to Once (the first stop after Del Parque) due to the growing population in the area between both stations. Rail tracks crossed along streets and avenues (such as Corrientes) with high vehicle and pedestrians traffic. In April 1878 the Municipality of Buenos Aires promulgated by decree the moving of the station to Once, also closing the Once–Del Parque section, though it did not take effect until 1883. In 1884 the Del Parque building became the Argentine Army's headquarters.

The new Once building was inaugurated in 1883, also made of wood but bigger than the previous one. Nevertheless, it would be replaced by the current building in 1890 due to the increasing traffic.

On September 13, 1886, the Buenos Aires Legislature promulgated the demolition of the building to build the new Teatro Colón. Works began in April 1890 and the theatre would be inaugurated in 1908.

== Gallery ==
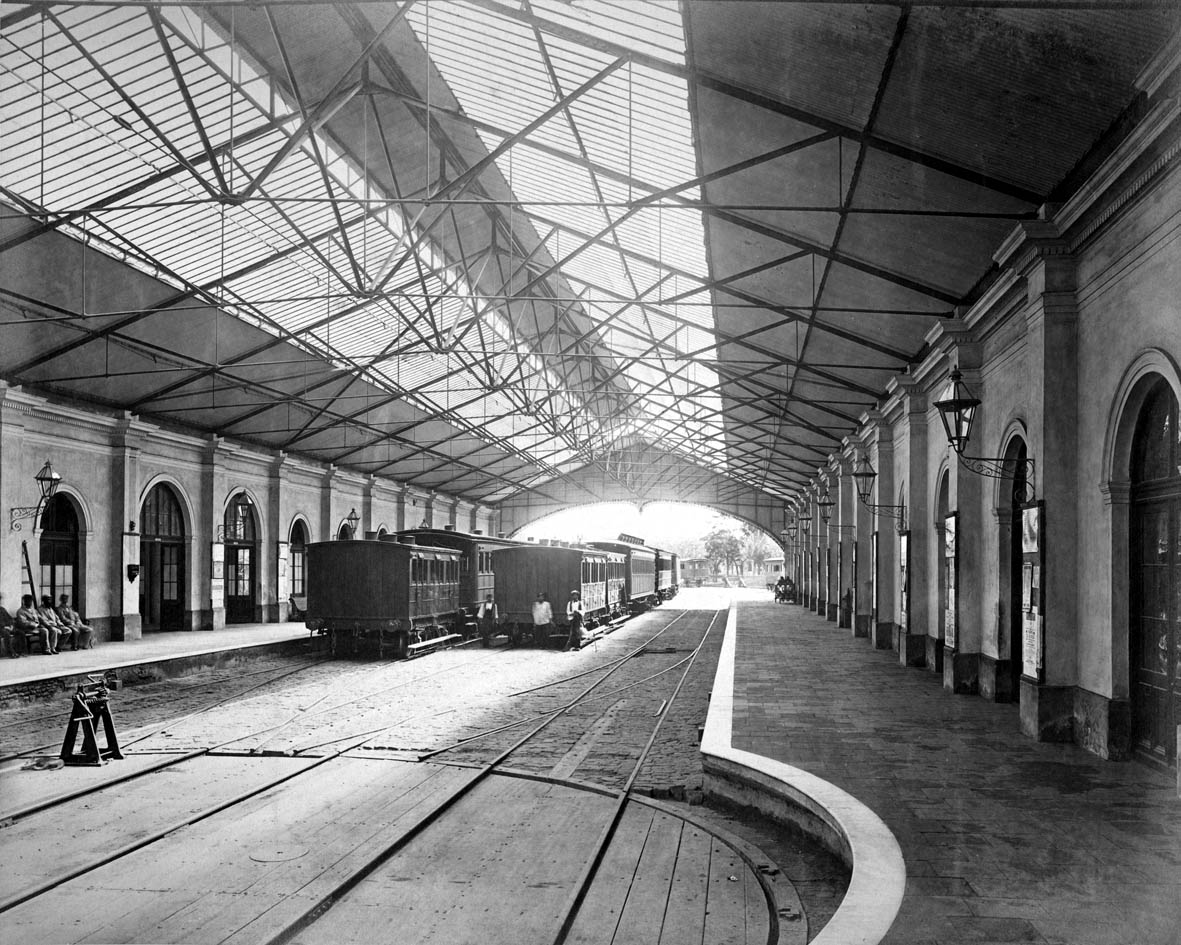
Interior view

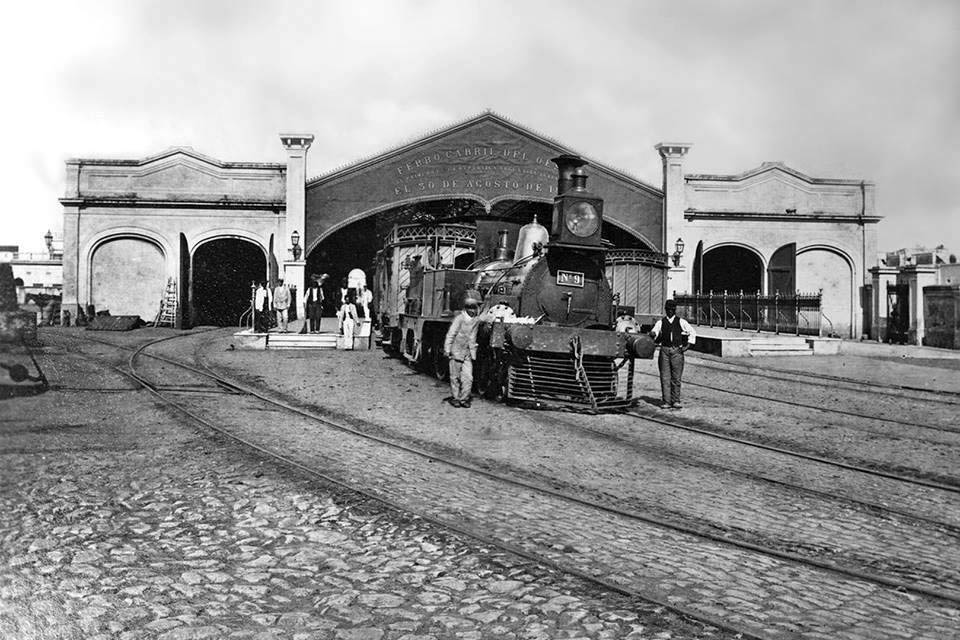
Trains at the station

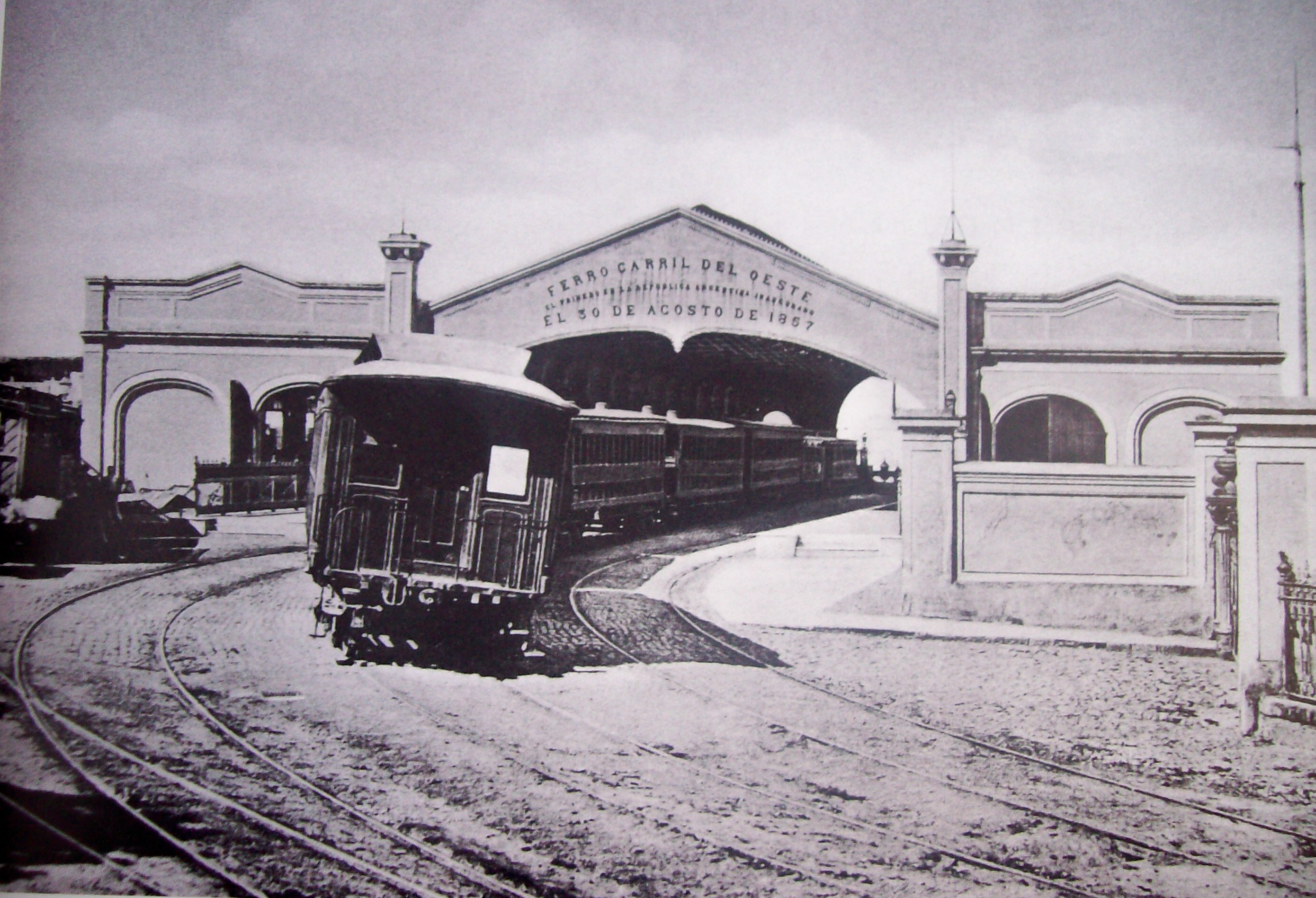
Train entering the station

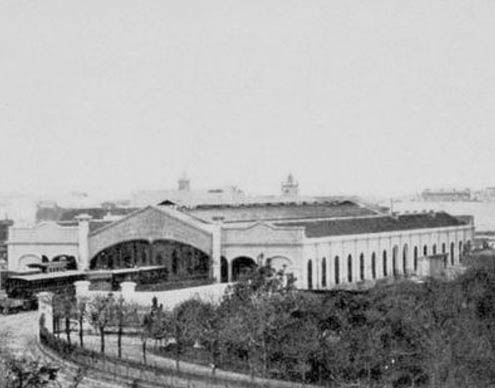
Surroundings

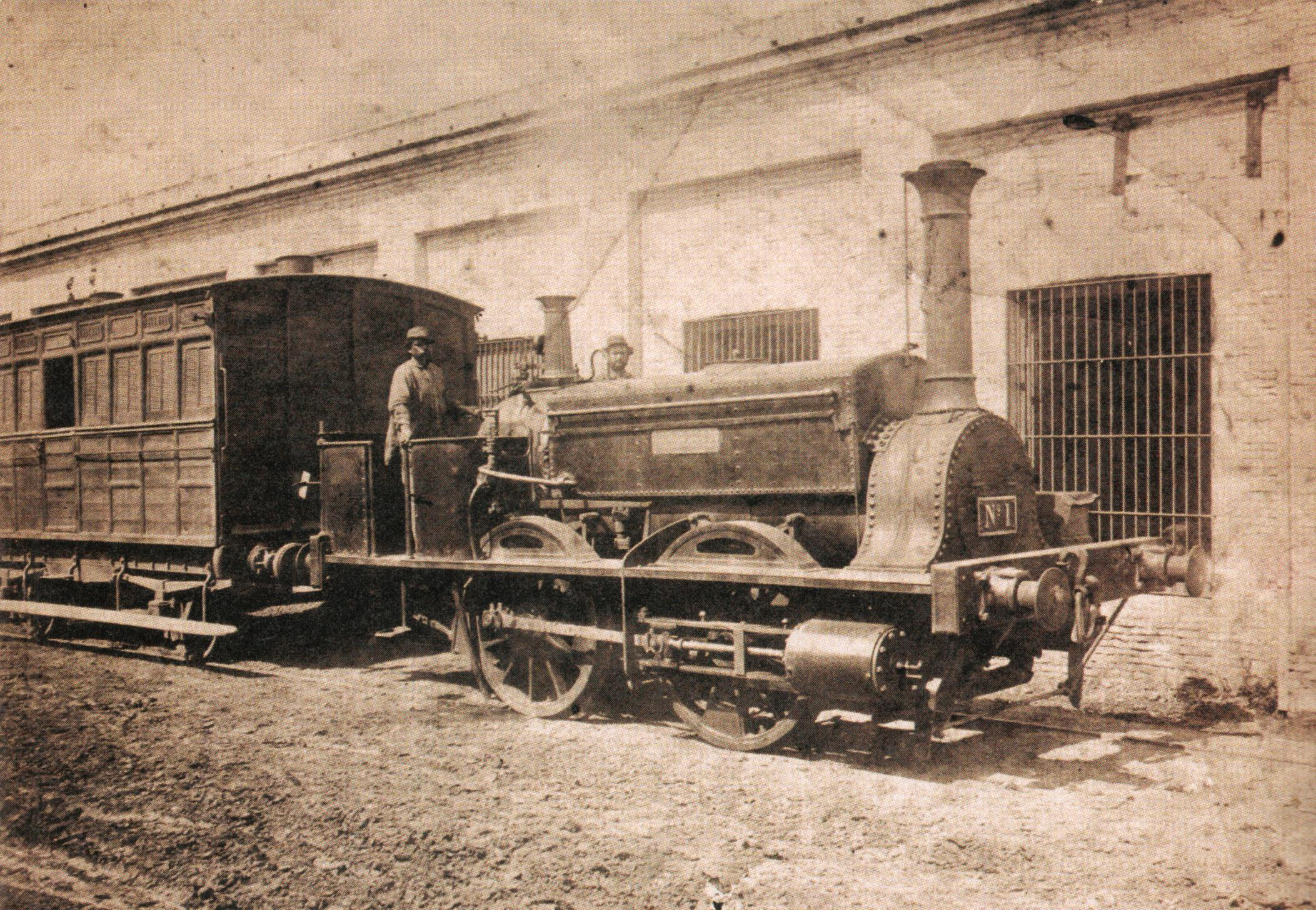
La Porteña at the station

== Bibliography ==
- Casella de Calderón, Elisa (1991). Plaza General Lavalle (First ed.). Revista Buenos Aires nos cuenta #19. ISBN 987-9105-14-1.
- Boragno, Susana H. (2007). Revista: Historias de la Ciudad de Buenos Aires, Los 150 años del primer ferrocarril argentino (in Spanish). Lulemar. ISSN 1514-8793.
- Cutolo, Vicente (1994). Buenos Aires: Historia de los barrios de Buenos Aires (in Spanish). Buenos Aires: Elche. ISBN 950-99212-2-X.
- Codex, ed. (1968). Crónica Histórica Argentina (in Spanish). Vol. IV and V.
- "Nuestra primer locomotora: La Porteña y el Ferrocarril Oeste". Ferro Aficionados Argentinos (in Spanish). Archived from the original on 26 October 2009.
