= Trenque Lauquen Partido =

Trenque Lauquen Partido de Trenque Lauquen
- Department
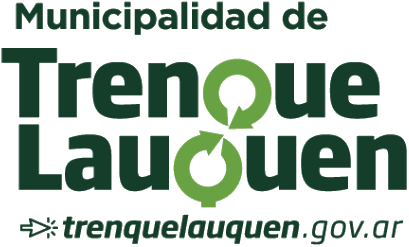

- location of Trenque Lauquen Partido in Buenos Aires Province
- Coordinates: 35°58′S 62°41′W
- Country: Argentina
- Established: April 12, 1876
- Founder: Conrado Excelso Villegas
- Seat: Trenque Lauquen

Government
  - Intendant: Francisco Recoulat (UCR)

Area
  - Total: 5,500 km^{2} (2,100 sq mi)

Population
  - Total: 40,181
  - Density: 7.3/km^{2} (19/sq mi)
- Demonym: trenquelauquenche
- Postal Code: B6400
- IFAM: BUE126
- Area Code: 02392
- Patron saint: Nuestra Señora del Rosario
- Website: trenquelauquen.gov.ar

Trenque Lauquen is a subdivision (partido) of the Buenos Aires Province, Argentina, 446 km (277 mi) to the west of the city of Buenos Aires. The main town is Trenque Lauquen.

== Settlements ==
- Trenque Lauquen
- Treinta de Agosto
- Beruti
- Girodias
- La Carreta
