= Ñanco Lauquen Airport =

Airport in Argentina

- IATA: none; ICAO: SAET; LID: TQL

Summary
- Airport type: Public
- Serves: Trenque Lauquen, Argentina
- Elevation AMSL: 302 ft / 92 m
- Coordinates: 35°58′20″S 62°46′20″W

Map
- Location of the airport in Argentina

Runways
Direction	Length		Surface
Direction	m	ft	Surface
02/20	1,201	3,940	Asphalt
- Source: Landings.com Google Maps

Ñanco Lauquen Airport (ICAO: SAET) is a public use airport serving Trenque Lauquen, a town in the Buenos Aires Province of Argentina. The airport is 2 kilometres (1 mi) west of the town.

Runway 20 has a 200 metres (660 ft) unpaved overrun available. The General Pico VOR (Ident: GPI) is located 50.5 nautical miles (94 km) west-northwest of the airport.

== See also ==
- Transport in Argentina
- List of airports in Argentina
