= Buenos Aires Western Railway =

First railway in Argentina (opened 1857)

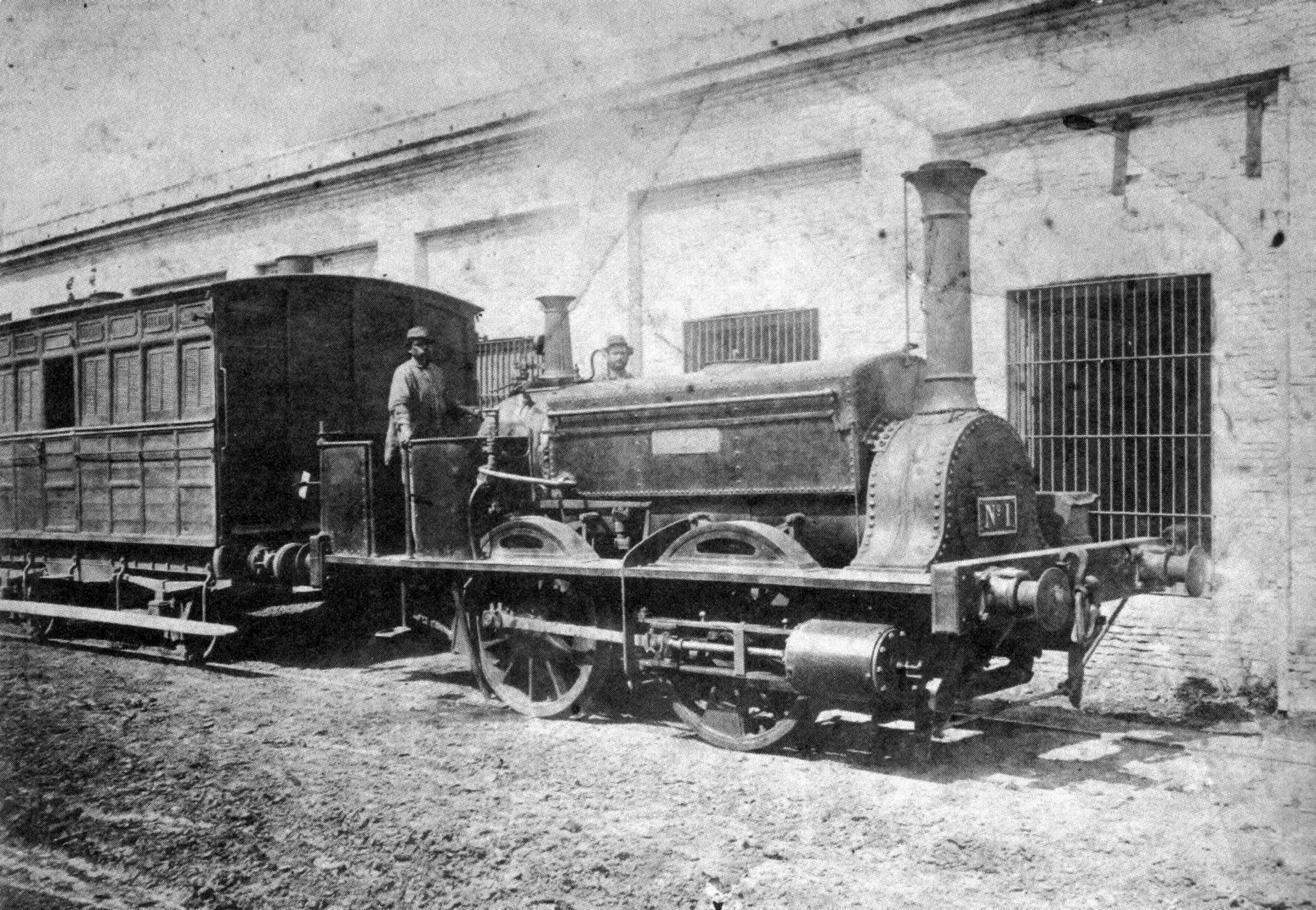
- Locomotive La Porteña, c. 1873

Overview
- Native name: Ferrocarril Oeste de Buenos Aires
- Status: Defunct company; lines active
- Owner: Buenos Aires Province (1857–1890); Buenos Aires Western R. (1890–1948)
- Locale: Buenos Aires; La Pampa
- Termini: Once

Service
- Type: Inter-city

History
- Opened: 1857
- Closed: 1948; 78 years ago

Technical
- Track gauge: 1,676 mm (5 ft 6 in)
Route map
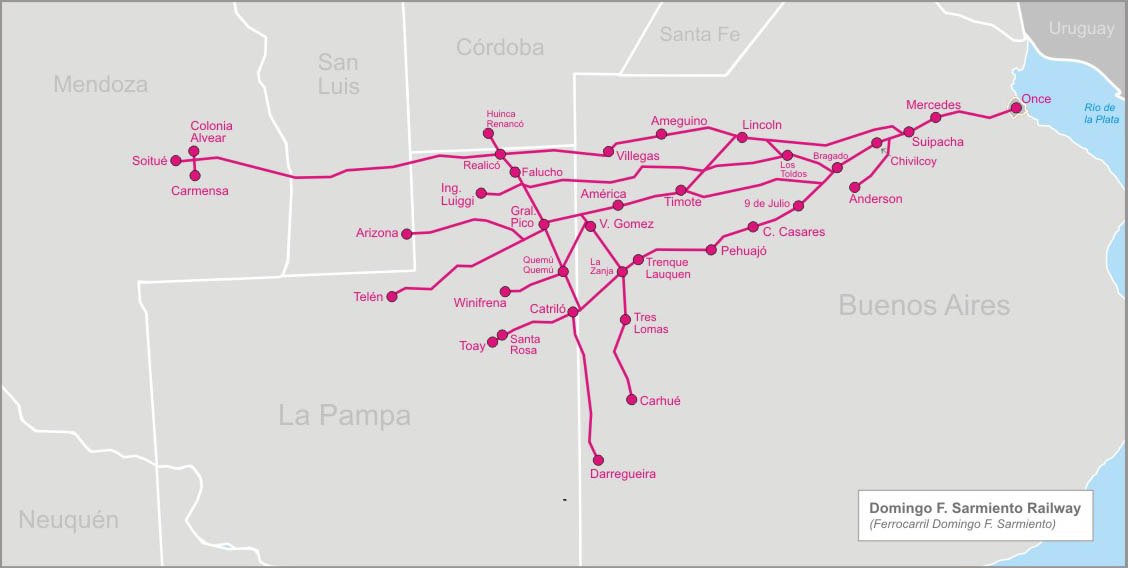

The Buenos Aires Western Railway (BAWR; Spanish: Ferrocarril Oeste de Buenos Aires), inaugurated in the city of Buenos Aires on 29 August 1857, was the first railway built in Argentina and the start of the extensive rail network that was developed over the following years. The locomotive La Porteña, built by the British firm EB Wilson & Company in Leeds, hauled the first train to travel on this line.

The BAWR was one of the Big Four broad gauge, 5 ft 6 in (1,676 mm) British companies that built and operated railway networks in Argentina.

The route initially measured 10 km (6.2 mi), stretching from Del Parque station (now the site of the Teatro Colón) to Floresta station, which at that time was located in San José de Flores village, but is now within Buenos Aires city limits. The rails were laid along what are now Lavalle, Enrique S. Discépolo, Avenida Corrientes, and Avenida Pueyrredón, and then followed the route of the current Domingo Sarmiento Railway line towards Floresta.

Although the construction of this line was proposed by a group of private individuals known as the "Sociedad del Camino-Ferrocarril al Oeste" (in English: "Western Railway Society"), it was financed by the province of Buenos Aires, which was at that time an independent state of the Argentine Confederation. In 1863 the province became the sole owner of the railway line.

The Western Railway was one of the greatest triumphs of Buenos Aires state, which justified its 27 years of ownership of the railway based on the wealth it brought to the city, its efficiency, and its lower fares than those of the British-owned railway companies operating in the country. Pressure from British capital and the debts owed by the state of Argentina led to its sale in 1890 to the British company "Buenos Aires Western Railway".

The BAWR network is currently part of the Domingo Sarmiento Railway network.

== History ==
=== Background ===
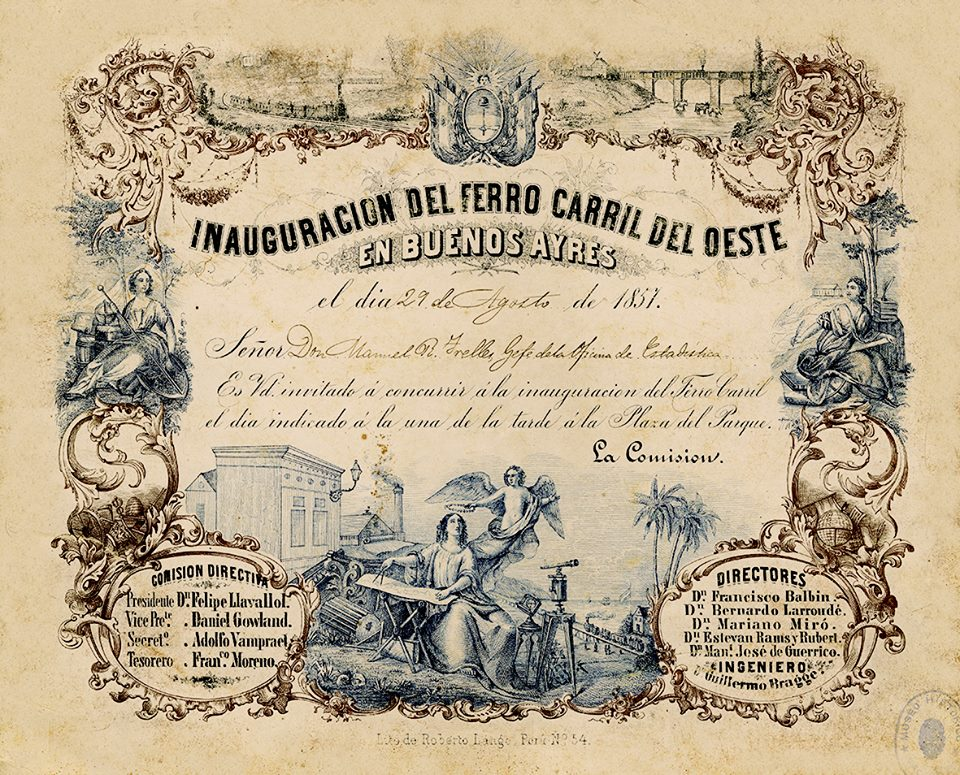
Invitation card to the opening of the line, 1857.

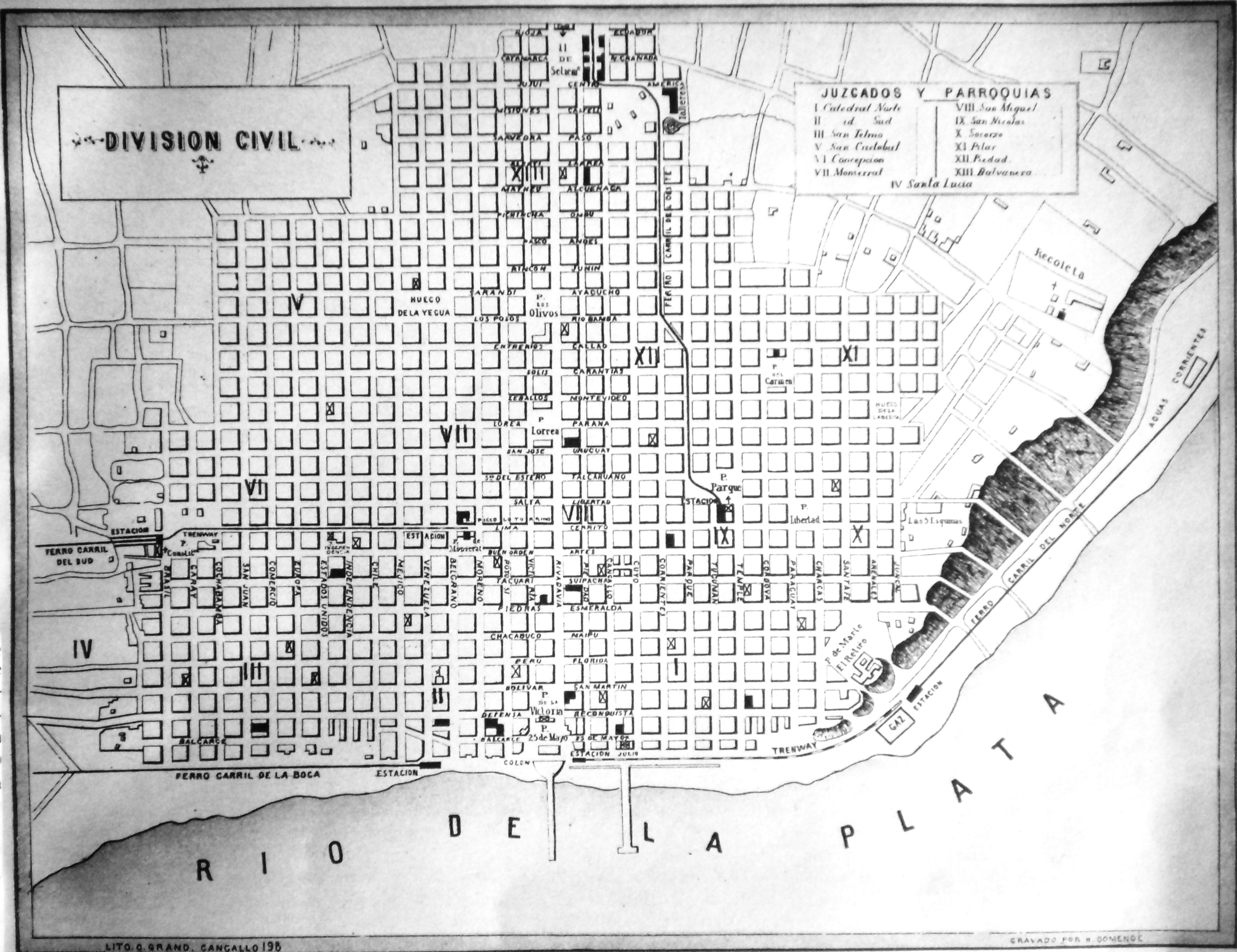
Map of the line in the city of Buenos Aires, 1870.

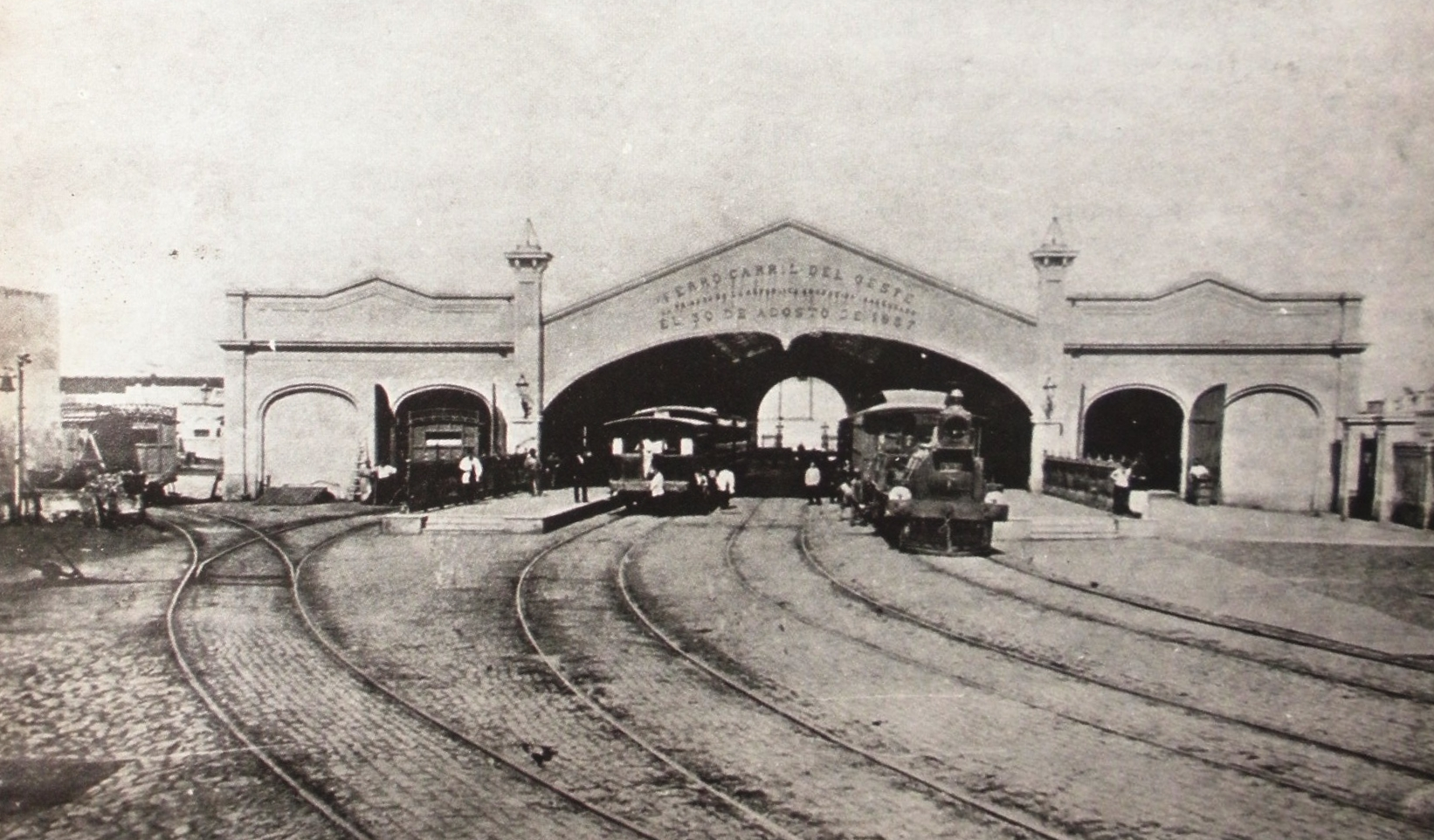
Del Parque, the main station, demolished in 1889.

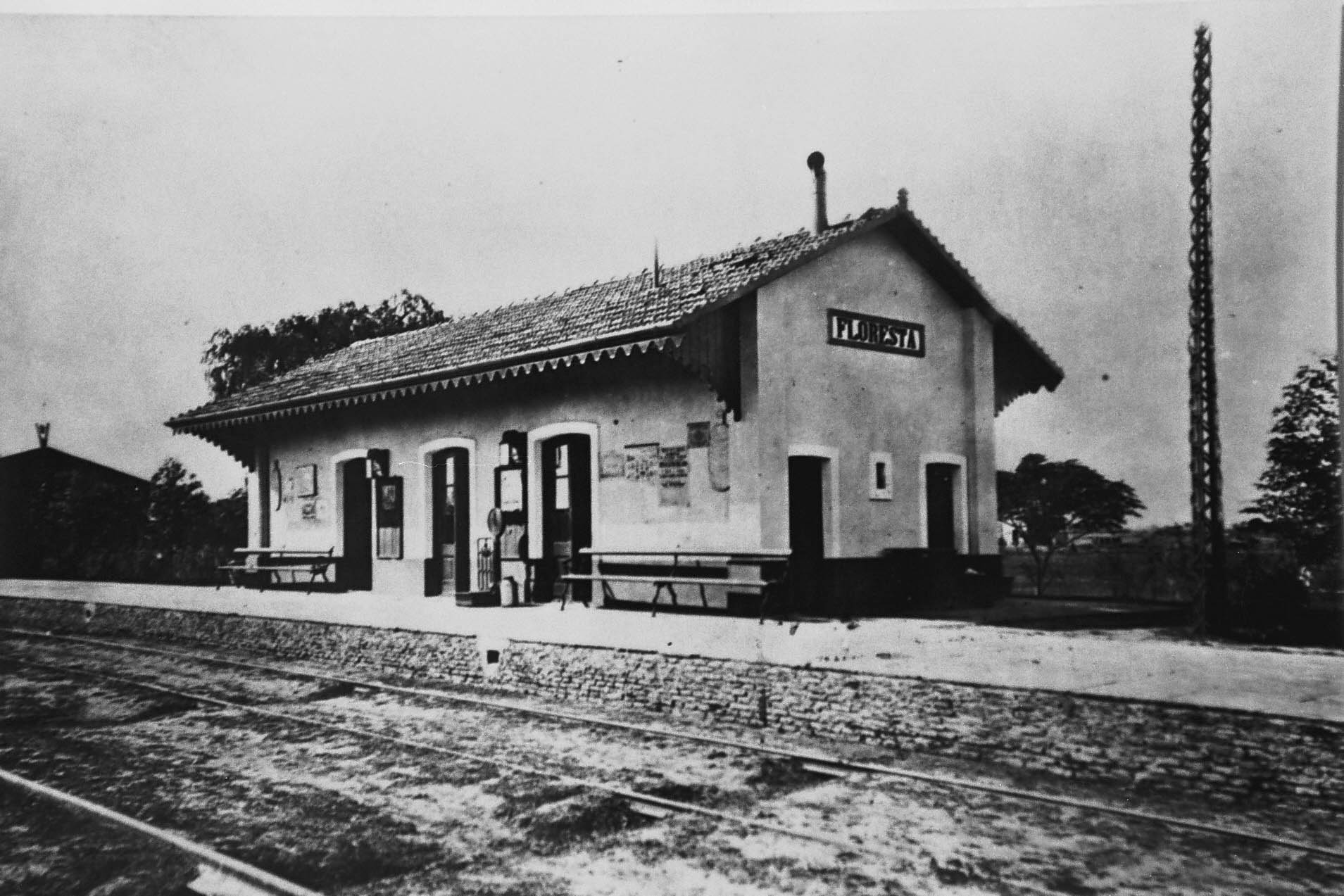
La Floresta (c. 1869), the first terminus.

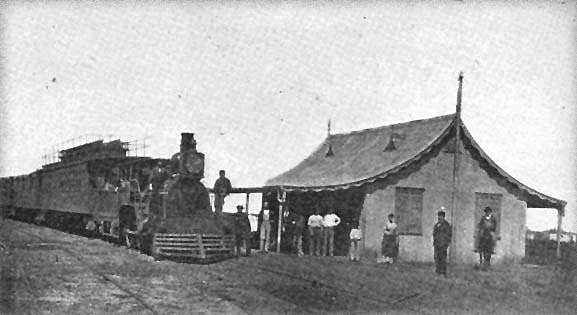
Caballito station, c. 1878.

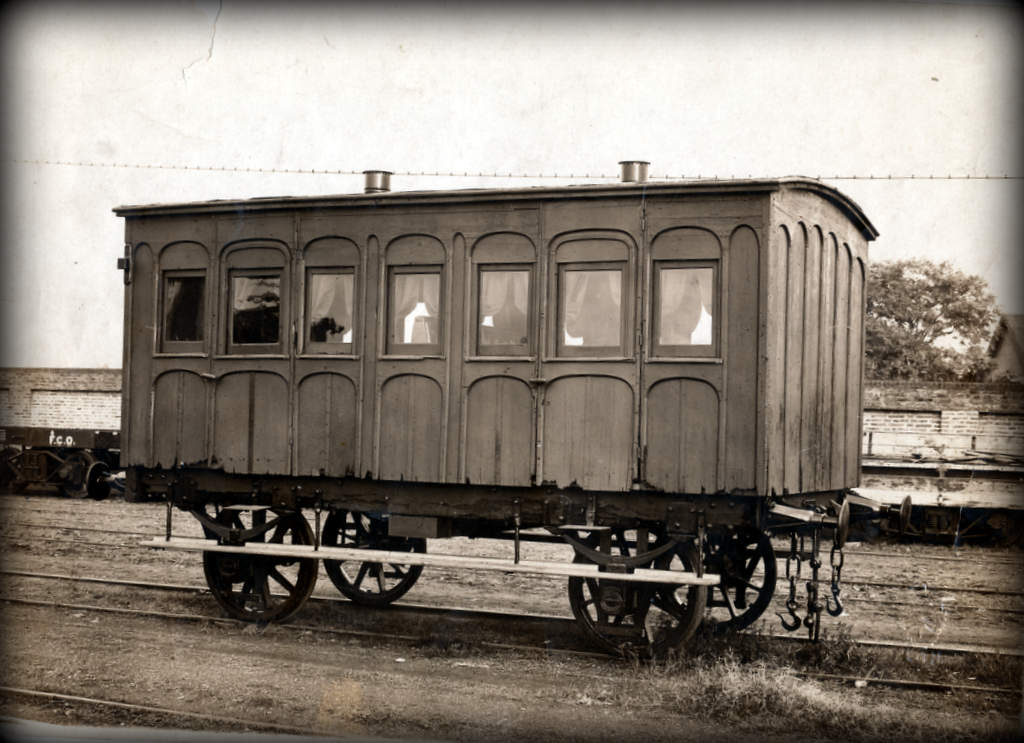
Passenger coach.

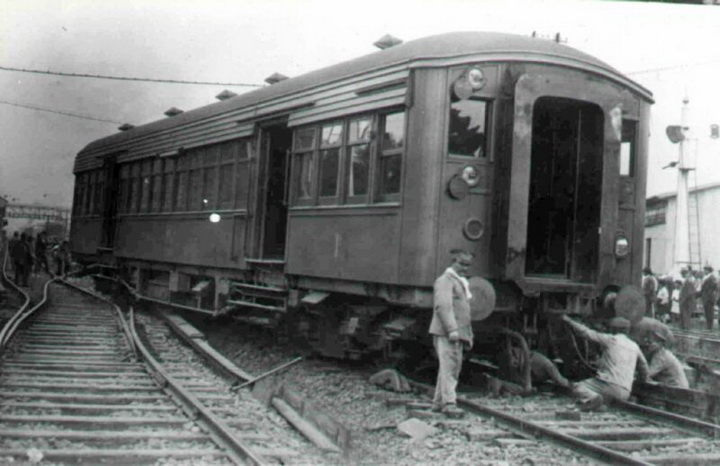
A Metro-Cammell wagon derailed in Liniers, 1890s.

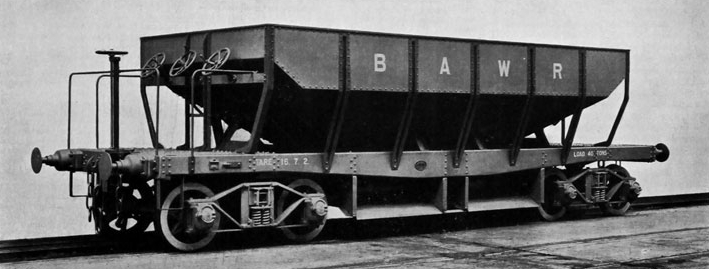
Hopper ballast wagon built by Leeds Forge Company in 1911.

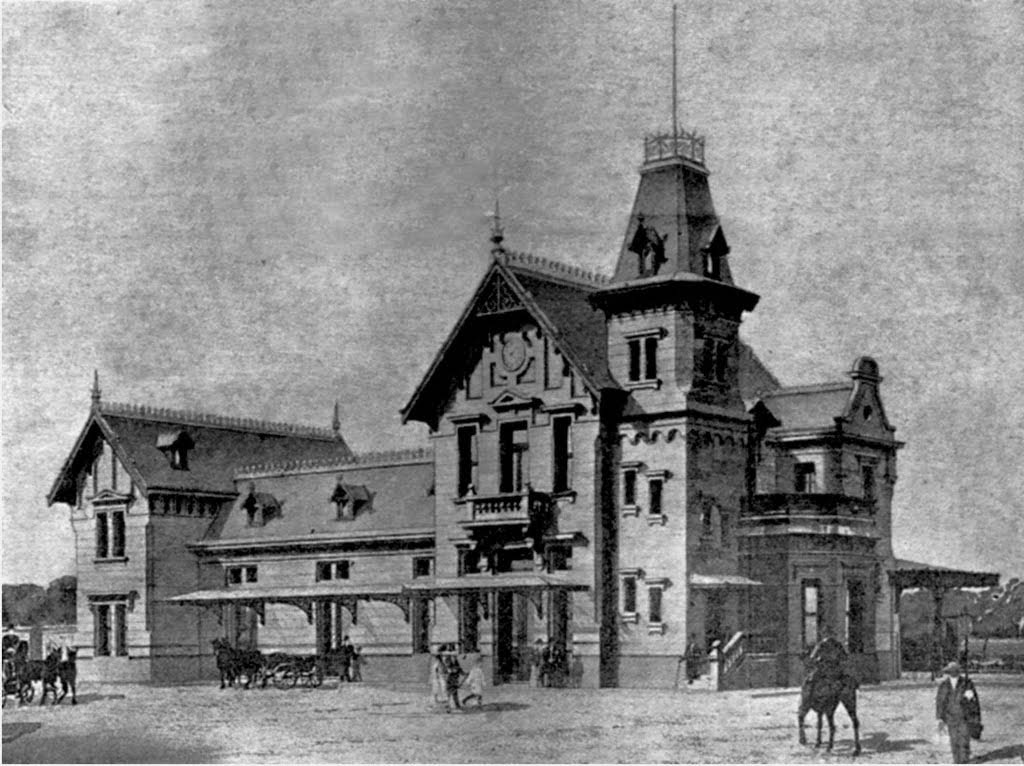
Ramos Mejía station, opened in 1858, still active.

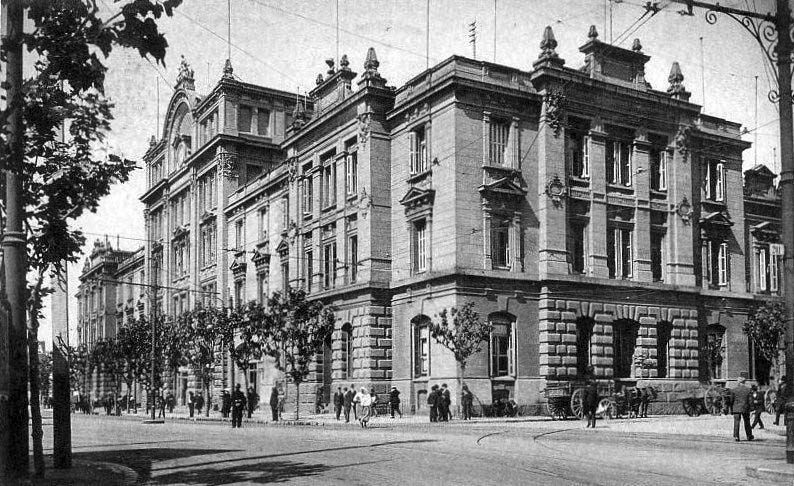
Once de Septiembre, the new terminus, opened in 1883.

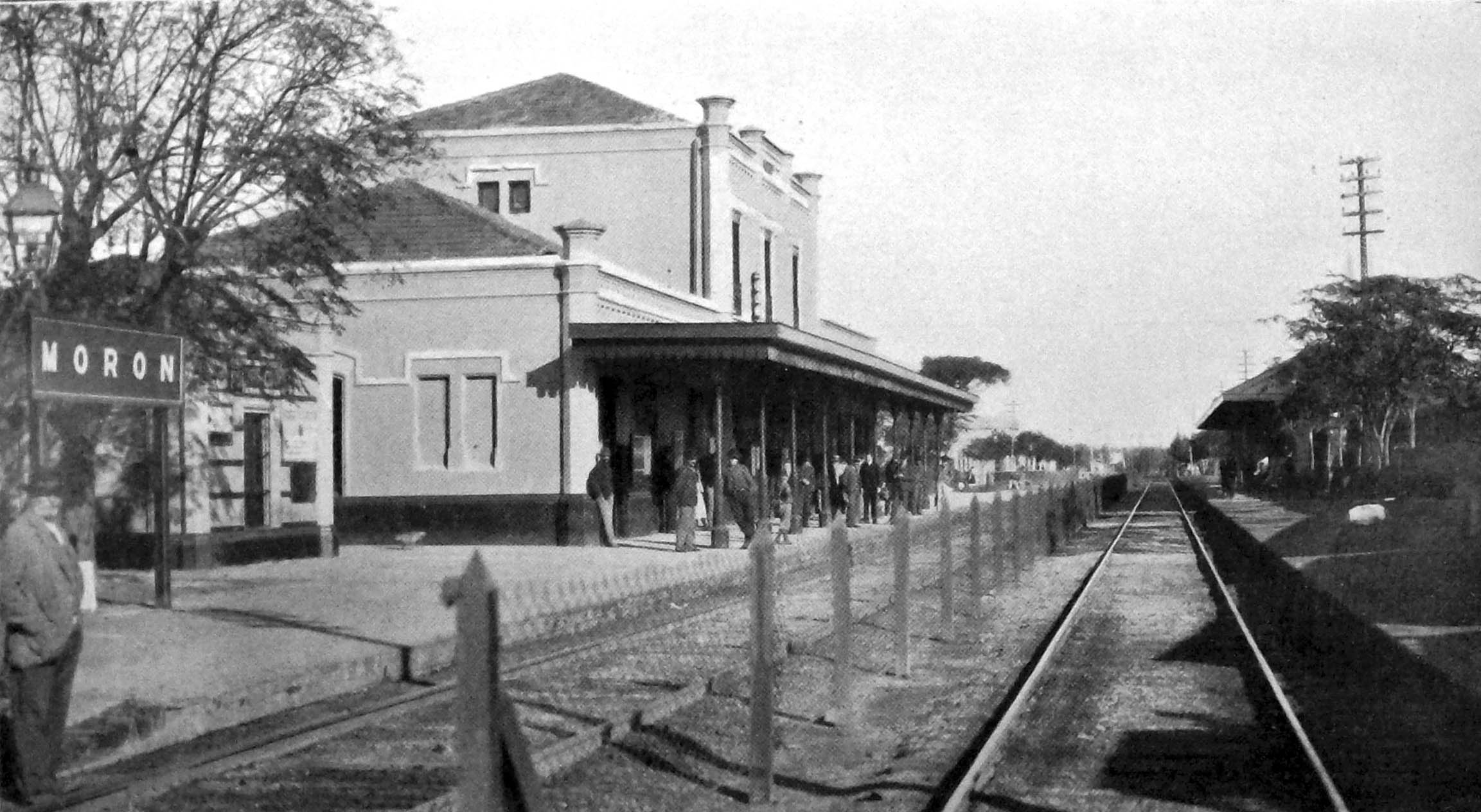
Morón station, 1910.

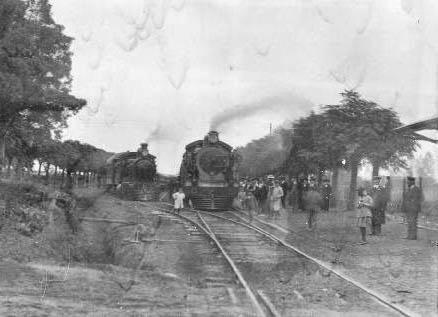
Basílica station received pilgrims to Luján Basilica.

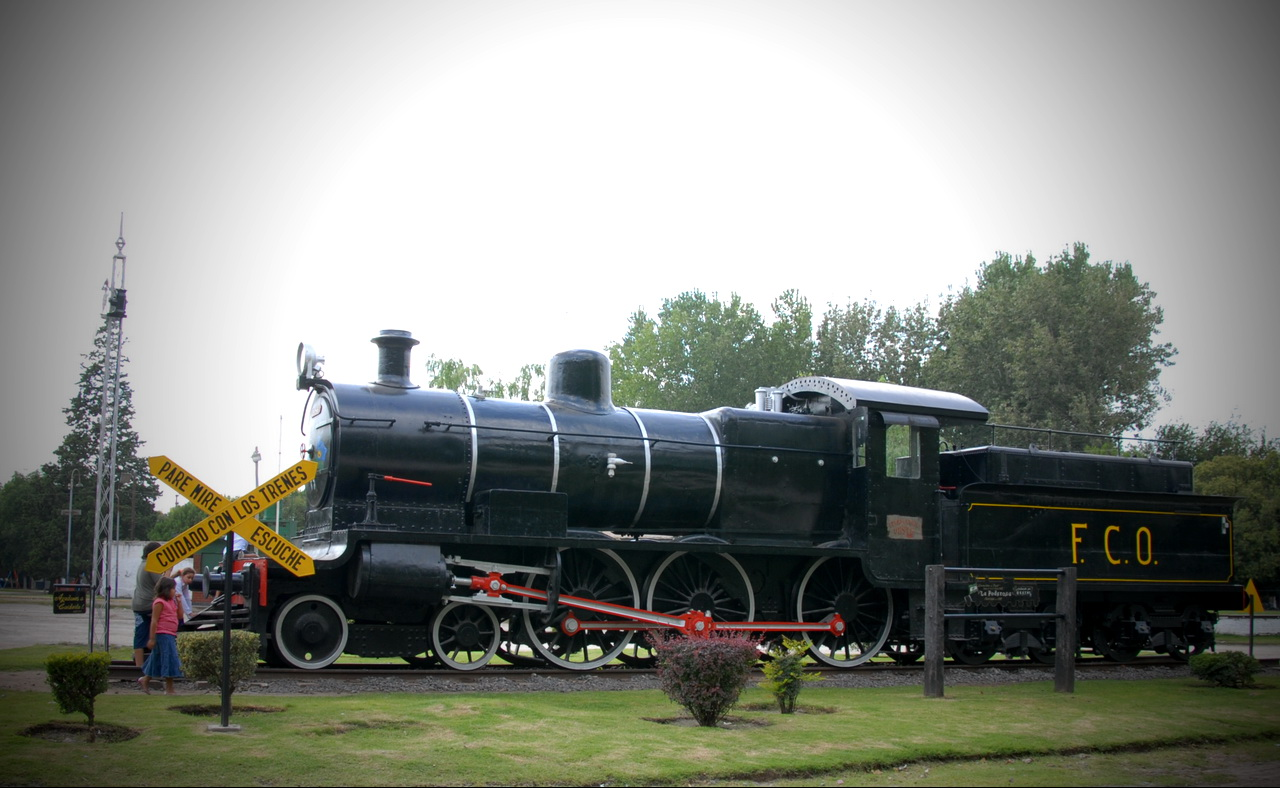
Steam locomotive, currently exhibited in Marcos Paz.

In 1854, while Buenos Aires was an independent state of the Argentine Confederation, governor Pastor Obligado awarded the Buenos Aires Western Railroad Society a grant to construct a railway, from the city of Buenos Aires westward. This grant was fulfilled by a bill presented on 9 January by a financing committee consisting of Dalmacio Vélez Sársfield, Bartolomé Mitre and Mariano Billinghurst.

The railway's importance had already been pointed out by Juan Bautista Alberdi, who wrote in his work Basis and starting point for the Political Organization of the Argentina Republic that "the railway is the means of turning around what the colonizing Spaniards did on this continent". Domingo Faustino Sarmiento and Justo José de Urquiza had also defended the idea. On 17 September 1853, the Railway Society — formed by a group of traders aware of the progress in communications and the demonstration of power the railway would bring — requested a grant to build a railway for both passengers and cargo, with cars pulled by a steam engine. However, in 1854, just before construction began, the Society requested an exemption from using steam engines, arguing that it would be more convenient 'to use horses, which are cheap in this country, instead of coal, which is expensive.' This method had already been used in Europe. The motive behind this request remains unclear; it may have been because most of the population had never seen a locomotive and believed that this would be dangerous for the surrounding buildings because of the resulting vibration, or perhaps the company considered locomotives to be too costly and the expected number of passengers was low. It must be taken into account that the western railway had no guarantee of minimum earnings, as the soon-established British railways would have (among other benefits). They would only earn what they obtained from their own activities. In any case, steam engines were finally purchased.

A law sanctioned by Buenos Aires province's Chamber of Representatives established the donation of public land, free import of supplies and tax exemptions.

Among the engineers who worked on the project were Verger (who created the original plans), Mouillard (a French engineer responsible for leveling the route) and, later, William Bragge, who had already built the first railway in Rio de Janeiro. 150 workers were also hired.

=== Locomotive and carriages ===
A steam engine named La Porteña arrived on 25 December 1856. Built by the firm E. B. Wilson and Company at The Railway Foundry in Leeds, England, it was purchased by the first administrator of the Railroad Company, the engineer Luis Elordi. Its mechanics, the brothers John and Tomas Allan, came with it.

A now-discounted popular legend says the locomotive came via Crimea; for example, Raúl Scalabrini Ortiz wrote in Historia de los Ferrocarriles Argentinos (History of the Argentinian railways) (1940), that "it was built for India and used in the siege of Sevastopol, during the Crimean War. The diffusion of wide gauge railway lines here (unusual within the world) is due to this fortuitous circumstance." However, some historians deny this, and research in the 1950s showed that this story is untenable; for example, Julio A. Luqui Lagleyze does not believe this could be the case, "since it uses a different gauge, and the dates of its construction and entrance into the country leave a gap which would not have allowed this". Others have been of the same opinion, including Vicente O. Cutolo. The works number shows the locomotive left Leeds in 1856, after the demolition of the Crimea railway had already begun. Its dimensions and characteristics would have been unsuitable for the steep gradients in Balaclava, and technical considerations would have prevented conversion from standard to broad gauge.

Contrarily, contemporary reports claim that engines from the GCCR went to Argentina; see for instance Richard Francis Burton who mentions in his "Letters From the Battlefields of Paraguay" (1870) that the train he travelled in was pulled by an "asthmatic little engine—which, after serving its time upon the Balaklava line, and being condemned as useless at Buenos Aires, had been shipped off to Paraguay"

A carriage pulled by 30 oxen brought the locomotive from the port to the station. The vehicle was a 0-4-0 saddle tank engine, capable of running 25 kilometres per hour (16 miles per hour) and weighing 15.75 metric tons (15.50 long tons; 17.36 short tons). It remained in use until August 1889, after which it was only used for shunting for ten years. It is currently on exhibit in the Provincial Transport Museum which forms part of the Enrique Udaondo Provincial Museographic Complex in Luján, together with one of the wooden carriages.

The first of the company's mechanics was the Italian Alfonso Covassi, who had one year's experience in the position after having been employed by the company Strada Ferrata Leopoldina, from Tuscany, Italy.

The second engine which worked together with La Porteña was called La Argentina. It was transferred to Paraguay in 1869 by Domingo Sarmiento, together with four other locomotives. The engines were given names such as Rauch, Libertad, Indio amigo and Voy a Chile, the latter named because of a decree in December 1868 which ordered the line to be extended up to the Andes. However, it never reached Chile.

The train initially consisted of four carriages each carrying 30 passengers, with a central entrance on one side. The carriages were wooden and had four axles, lit by oil lamps and very luxurious. There were 12 cargo wagons which could each carry up to 5 tons.

=== Opening and first public trip ===
Rain prevented the train's inauguration planned for January 1857. However, a successful trial was carried out during that month. On 7 April the train derailed during another test, but at a low speed and with no fatalities. In June another test was carried out, and in August a test journey, with one carriage of packages and another of passengers pulled by La Porteña, carried Bartolomé Mitre, Dalmacio Vélez Sársfield, Valentín Alsina, and some members of the Society. The outward journey presented no difficulties, but on the way back the overenthuiastic passengers persuaded British mechanic, John Allan, to ask for more speed, which led to a derailment adjacent to Almagro station breaking several metres of the track. Some of the passengers suffered light injuries. One of the witnesses commented as follows:

The journey was slow and the train reached Floresta with no problems. With the train ready to return and the commissioners pleased with the first trial, they ordered Mr Allan to return at a greater speed until, halfway along the line with the train on an embankment, the train shook, then ran for some distance along the sleepers, breaking 60 or 70 metres of the track. The shock was very violent; Mr Van Praet and Mr Gowland bumped heads, the latter ending up with a bleeding head wound. Mr Moreno was launched headfirst into the body of Mr Llavallol, and Mr Miró, who smoked, ended up with his cigarrette down the back of his neck, burning him under his shirt.

— Witness statement.

Raquel Fusoni Elordi, granddaughter of Luis Elordi (the above-mentioned company administrator), in a letter to the readers of the newspaper La Prensa dated 10 October 1957, refers to the pre-opening tests thus:

In 1857, after a thousand setbacks, the work was finished. The rails brought from Europe did not reach Flores, so they had to be constructed from wood coated with sheet metal, which jumped every time the train passed over them and the laborers had to run to nail them down again. At one of the tests the convoy derailed, a fact which had to be kept secret in order not to alarm the population. On 30 August the opening was almost suspended, because some drunkards tried to tip La Porteña over, an occurrence prevented by Elordi's opportune intervention.

— Buenos Aires nos cuenta magazine

While most of the population did not find out, those interested in the business did everything possible to stop the accident from becoming known, and it became clear that it was necessary to make some more adjustments before the inauguration.

Another story of a test journey makes it clear that vandalism was another serious problem in carrying out the project. In Los Debates, 7 August 1857, it says:

The route is beautiful. It runs parallel to the main street to Flores, passing estates and fields on both sides, presenting the most beautiful panorama for viewing. We travelled at 20 miles per hour of the 400 "rail" shafts. We had to pass opposite Flores: some miscreant had ripped out one of the hidden crossbars on which the rails rest (...) Just as bad was the removal of poles and wires which surrounded the line in order to keep out horses on Sunday night, which could be seen by their footprints and by the sticks and wires left a short distance away.

— Los Debates.

On 27 August a new and successful test was carried out. On that day the country's first telegraph network was also started up, laid out by the company with the aim of helping the rail service.

Finally, on 29 August 1857 (a sunny Saturday) the opening ceremony took place, presided over by the governor of Buenos Aires, Valentín Alsina. On the inaugural journey he was accompanied by, among others, Bartolomé Mitre, Domingo F. Sarmiento, Dalmacio Vélez Sárfield, Estanislao del Campo, members of the Railroad Society and special guests such as local political boss José María Yanquetruz, in military dress.

That morning a mass was celebrated and the engines La Porteña and La Argentina were blessed. La Porteña and its carriages, driven by Alfonso Corazzi (also acting as stoker), was waved off from the decorated station by a crowd, and reached San José de Flores village, where a band played the Marcha a Lavalle. Finally it reached the terminal station, La Floresta, where it was welcomed by a crowd and the company gave a refreshment service to the passengers in the local Café Restaurant.

From 30 August 1857 a regular public service was offered twice a day in each direction. A new night service was apparently soon authorised. A first class ticket was $10, and second or open-carriage tickets were $5. From the first trip until 31 December of that year, 56,190 passengers and 2,257 tons of cargo were transported. In Buenos Aires the population at the time was approximately 170,000 inhabitants. In 1858 the line transported 185,566 passengers and 6,747 tons of cargo.

=== The original route ===
Real-estate interests came into play when determining the location of the starting station. As a result meetings, which took place in the home of antiques dealer Manuel José Guerrico, were kept secret. The place finally chosen for the station was opposite the "Plaza del Parque" (known as Plaza General Lavalle since 1878), so named because since 1822 the park's artillery building was located opposite. The site of the station, named after the park, was approximately the same as the current location of the Teatro Colón, between "Cerrito" (previously "Del Cerrito"), "Tucumán", "Libertad" and "Viamonte" (previously "Temple") streets. The Plaza was merely a gap in the city which, precisely because of the station, began to quickly urbanise and its surroundings' appearance were improved with plants and trees.

In 1858 the company offered a horse-drawn bus service to allow people to reach the park station from Defensa, Perú and Piedras streets (between Chile and Mexico streets) and from Plaza Concepción.

In the first year of service the route was 10 km long, over a 1,676 m gauge (5' 6"), the same as that used by some colonial English railways. For the safety of pedestrians the beginning of the train's route was surrounded by two tall sets of railings brought over from England.

The route left Del Parque station towards the west, zigzagging through the square, which provoked serious complaints from neighbours who said that their environment was being invaded, to reach what is now the corner of Talcahuano and Lavalle.

It continued straight on along this last street, passing opposite Artillery Park (now the site of the Palace of Justice) up to Callao boulevard (now Avenida Callao). There it moved in an S shape towards the south-east, bringing it to what is now avenida Corrientes. This S-shaped stretch of the train's route is remembered thanks to artwork by Marino Santa María on the facades of the buildings on the eastern side.

From Corrientes it continued straight on to Pueyrredón avenue (previously "Centroamérica"), where it turned sharply and continued onto Cangallo (now Juan Domingo Perón), then returned to a westerly heading to enter the West Market (now Plaza Miserere) and the wooden Once de Septiembre (later replaced by the current station), reached by Ecuador to the west and named after 11 September 1852, the date of the rebellion of Buenos Aires Province against the Federal Government.

Workshops functioned between Corrientes, Paso, Tucumán and Pueyrredón until 1887. The line then followed a route parallel to present-day Bartolomé Mitre up to the triangle formed by the current streets Medrano, Pelufo and Lezica, where the (also wooden) unmanned station Almagro was located. This area only contained a few scattered farmhouses and ceased to function in 1887.

At that time Medrano street was called the "Camino del Límite" (Boundary Road), which indicated the city limits of Buenos Aires, and on crossing this street the train was then in the administrative area of San José de Flores. Two kilometres further west, on reaching what is now the calle Federico García Lorca (then Caballito and later Cucha Cucha) it reached the wood and cardboard station Caballito (named for the pulperia established by Genovese merchant Nicolás Vila in 1804, that had a horse-shaped weather vane on its roof). After crossing Caballito (an area of luxurious estates and houses), and close to Caracas (then called Paz) trains reached the wooden station of San José de Flores, which in 1862 was moved 250m to the west to what is now called Gral. José Gervasio Artigas (then called Sud América) due to a property dispute with the land owners. The village of Flores only contained a temple, a plaza, small houses and a few businesses.

Continuing to the west, at 10 km from its starting point, between Joaquín V. González (then "Esperanza") and Bahía Blanca (first an unnamed street and then "De La Capilla") it reached Floresta station (wooden). This station was for some time called "Vélez Sársfield", and in 1862 was replaced by a more modern building.

In 1858 it was extended 8 km to Ramos Mejía, in 1859 to Morón and in 1860 to Moreno, with which the route reached 39 km in length.

=== Purchase by Buenos Aires ===
The financial collaboration of the government of Buenos Aires was decisive in the initial organisation of the company, providing more than one million pesos, renouncing in advance any dividends coming from this sum, and providing another six million pesos to secure the extension of the line. On 1 January 1863 it became the sole proprietor of the company on buying stock from the private individuals, and under its administration the railway reached a length of 177 km in 1870. At this point it transported more than 500,000 passengers and 166,551 tons of cargo annually, producing a profit equivalent to a 9.78% return on the invested capital.

During the 27 years in which it belonged to the Government of the Province of Buenos Aires, the Western Railway was the line which was most luxurious, least wasteful in its bureaucratic-administrative expenditure and offered the most economical fares and cargo rates. It was a model company which was the pride of the Argentina, in relation to which all the English railway companies established in our country were, without exception, second-rate.

— Raúl Scalabrini Ortiz

In March 1865 the railway reached Mercedes, than extending to Chivilcoy one year after, without having any need to ask for financial aid. A Law promulgated in November 1868 obliged the Ferrocarril Oeste de Buenos Aires (FCO) to extend its lines to the Andes with the aim of connecting Atlantic and Pacific oceans routes. While the route to the Andes was being studied, the FCO extended its tracks to other cities such as Chivilcoy, Bragado, 9 de Julio, Pehuajó and Trenque Lauquen. The FCO also projected a line from Merlo to Aires and then to Azul, but the Buenos Aires Great Southern Railway (BAGSR) proposed in 1871 to extend its line (it had reached Chascomús in 1865) from that city to Dolores then reaching Azul. The Provincial Legislature approved the project brought by BAGSR in 1872, so the FCO had to drop its own project.

In 1871, during the epidemic of yellow fever in Buenos Aires, a railway line was added to function as a receiver of coffins. This branch left from Bermejo station, located on the south-east corner of the homonymous street (now Jean Jaurés) and Avenida Corrientes, and reached what is now the Parque Los Andes, where there was a cemetery which was later moved to the current La Chacarita Cemetery. It was known as the "train of death", and as well as the mortuary in Bermejo there were two others located on the south-east corners of Corrientes and Medrano and of Corrientes and Avenida Raúl Scalabrini Ortiz (then called Camino Ministro Inglés). John Allan, the above-mentioned first driver of La Porteña, drove this gloomy train and fell victim to the epidemic at the age of 36.

In 1873 the convenience of raising the tracks between Plaza del Parque terminus and Once de Septiembre station was already under consideration, due to the rapid urbanisation which had taken place along the route making the train's passage dangerous. The FCO reached Bragado in 1877. On 20 December 1882, the new Once de Septiembre station building was inaugurated. A municipal decree in April 1878 decided to move the terminus to Once de Septiembre but the company delayed its response to the request, despite a concurrent claim from the neighbourhood, until 1 January 1883. By 1879 the railway network comprised a total length of 297 km. That same year the net profit was $ 16,788,000. Four years later, the rail network increased to 583 km in length, with a net profit of $21,583,000; in 1885 the FCO comprised 892 km of tracks.

In June 1884 the offices of the Army's General Staff were installed in the Del Parque station building. On 13 September 1886 the Deliberative Council authorised the quartermaster to demolish the building and build the new Teatro Colón on the same site. The works began in April 1890. The theatre remains in this location today. In its place, in 1890 the building which replaced the wooden station of Once de Septiembre was also built.

In 1885 the following lines and branches were exploited by the FCO:

Start	End
Once	9 de Julio
Once	Las Catalinas
Once	Riachuelo
Bermejo	Chacarita
Merlo	Lobos–Saladillo
Luján	Pergamino
Pergamino	Junín
Pergamino	San Nicolás
Tolosa	La Plata
Tolosa	Ensenada
Tolosa	Ferrari (now Brandsen)
Tolosa	Temperley–Cañuelas

=== Sale to British investors ===
The British were pressing to purchase the railway at a low price. They had good reason for this, which was not related to earnings from its operation, but rather to what was said by the British government minister in Buenos Aires, Edward Thorton, in a report to the Foreign Office. This document, referring to the creation of the British line "Gran Sur de Buenos Aires", pointed out that this company "would open up a new market for British manufactured products". In effect, locomotives, bricks, bridges, sanitation tools for the stations, etc. were imported from Great Britain. So were large quantities of a non-manufactured product: the coal for the engines.

Three months after Juárez Celman became president of Argentina (1886–1890), the main line of the Ferrocarril Andino was sold to a British company. In 1887 the Central Norte was sold, and soon after so was the Western Railway. In his presidential speech of 1887 he announced: "I am planning to sell all public, reproductive works in order to pay our debts, because I am convinced that the State is the worst administrator".

In 1887 the Western Railway has already been condemned to death (...) The unnecessary growth in spending, largely due to the disproportionate increase in employees, the unavoidable increase in capital invested in construction, the resulting decrease in returns and the rise in ticket prices made up a definite intent to sabotage: the Western Railway would quickly be discredited in the public opinion. Fares were increased by 25%, and were still lower than those of the British railways.

— Raúl Scalabrini Ortiz, in Historia de los Ferrocarriles Argentinos

By 1887 the FCO network reached 1,022 km in length, increasing to 1,210 km two years later. By 1890, a FCO line reached Trenque Lauquen prior to its sale to a British company.

In 1888 the province sold a section of the Western Railway network close to La Plata to the Buenos Aires and Ensenada Port Railway. The National Government made a call for tender by decree in December 1889, for the sale of FCO at a minimum price of $34,068,728. The entire line was put up for sale with the exception of the branch from Tolosa to La Plata. The Témperley-Cañuelas line had been sold to Alejandro Henderson of BAGSR for $760,000. Finally, on 29 April 1890, the Ferrocarril del Oeste was officially sold to H.G. Anderson on behalf of Buenos Aires Western Railway Ltd for £8,134,920, equivalent to 4 million stamped gold pesos.

The governor argued that millions of gold pesos would "come from abroad to increase public wealth", to be "invested in drainage and irrigation, general and municipal roads and health and surfacing projects". According to Raúl Scalabrini Ortiz: "Needless to say, the small amounts of money gained by the sale of the Western were never used for such ends". Historian William Rögind found the sale of the railway to be imposed by the "wasteful provincial administration", at that time headed by governor Julio Costa. Historian H. S. Ferns pointed out that "the results of the sale could not save the province's financial situation".

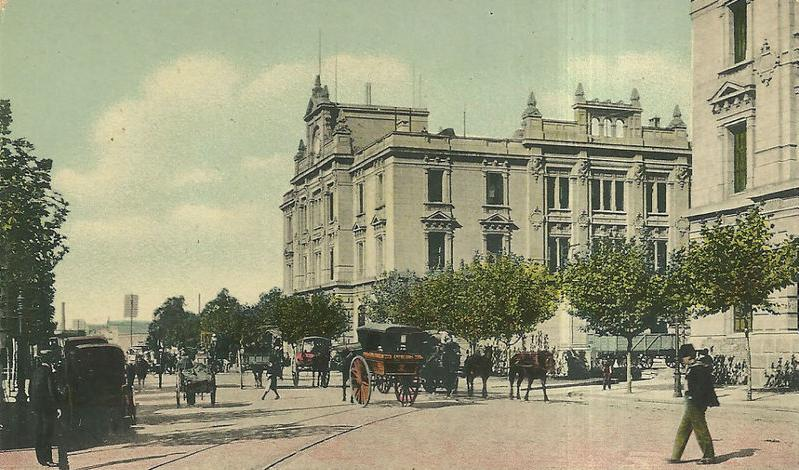
The Once de Septiembre terminus as seen at the beginning of the 20th century

While belonging to the British, the railway's reach was increased in the centre of Buenos Aires Province and La Pampa, and was extended south of Mendoza. In 1896, a small branch line (1,978m in length) was built from Luján station to a new stop built a few meters from the Basilica of Our Lady of Luján, where thousands of pilgrims arrived each 8 December to celebrate Solemnity of the Virgin Mary. Although it was a conditional service, it had a peak of 25 services per day.

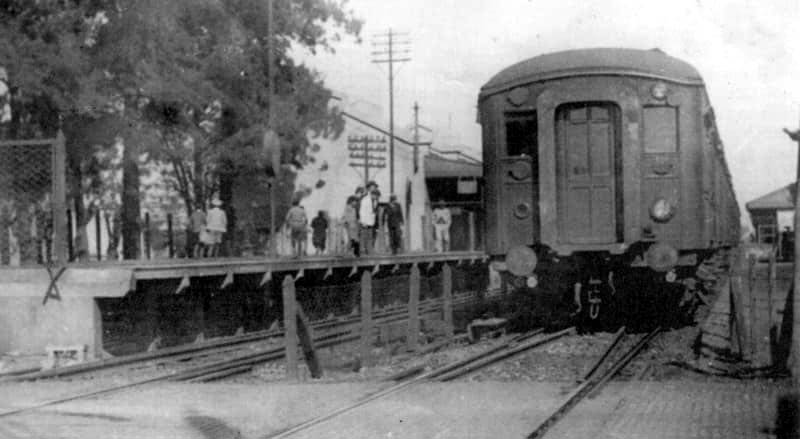
A train during the first days of the electrification of the service in 1923

Due to the increasing demand of services by an increasing population in suburban areas of Buenos Aires, the BAWR sent the Government a proposal to electrify the line from Once de Septiembre to Moreno and the branch Villa Luro–Versalles. The project also included the construction of a tunnel between Caballito and the Port of Buenos Aires. The government gave its approval, and works began in 1912. Nevertheless, the beginning of World War I delayed the shipping of goods to Argentina causing a delay in progress with the works. In March 1922, a provisional electrified service was opened from Villa Luro to Versalles. One year later, the electrified service to Haedo station was officially opened and, finally, the electric service reached Moreno on 1 May 1924.

The Once–Haedo line became the second railway line in Argentina to be electrified after the Retiro–Tigre section of Mitre Line (inaugurated in August 1916). Electric power was provided by a third rail system energized at 800 volts through several substations. Platforms were also elevated due to new coaches had higher doors.

Rolling stock was acquired from British companies Birmingham Railway Carriage & Wagon, Leeds Forge and Metropolitan Cammell Carriage & Wagon, similar in appearance to Metropolitan-Vickers units used by the Central Argentine Railway for the Retiro–Tigre line electrified in 1916.

After a brief period of prosperity during the decade of 1920, the situation becomes critical with the 1929 crash and the economic depression. By 1945 the British and French companies were seriously affected by the World War II, beginning contacts with the Government of Argentina to sell their railway lines that still operated in the country. As a result, the railway assets were acquired by the State of Argentina between 1 November 1947 and 1 March 1948. President Juan Domingo Perón sign the agreement whereby the government took over all the railway line.

In 1948, within the process of Nationalisation of the entire railway network carried out by president Juan Perón, the company passed into the hands of the national government, becoming part of Domingo Sarmiento Railway under the administration of Ferrocarriles Argentinos.

== Anecdotes ==
- Once a "cuarteador" challenged the steam engine to a tug-of-war with his horse, which was a champion at this game. It seemed at first that the horse was winning, but in reality it was a prank by the mechanics who had deliberately reversed in order to make him believe he was winning, only to immediately change direction and win, violently ripping the rope apart at the same time.
- "...there was no lack of curious episodes, such as the boy who lay down on the tracks for a bet, the train passing over him, and chief Yanquetruz who on entering the train looked for where the coal-eating, fire-breathing horse was hidden..."
  (Pastor Servando Obligado in "Tradiciones de Buenos Aires".)
- "...At night a carriage carrying a family ran the same risk. It came in at Paraná corner, and halfway across the square it was surprised by the train which leaves Park station at 9.25 pm. There would have been no avoiding it if the carriage had not managed to mount the pavement on the left. The carriage driver was not afraid, and with a few good lashes of the whip managed to urge his nags to the mentioned task. It was time. The train passed by, grazing the carriage’s wheels. The reader can imagine the unpleasant moment which the family within the carriage passed. To avoid a repeat of these mishaps or worse, guardrails should be recommended on this street to stop the entrance of all types of vehicle five minutes before the train is supposed to cross it. "
  (La Nación, 16 August 1882).
- For the steam engines to run well, pure water was a requirement. In 1856, as proposed by Eduardo Madero, the Western Railway decided to increase the bore of a pipe which transported water to the filters from Recoleta to Park Station, in order to also provide water to the rest of the neighbourhood. This private undertaking became the first pure water service in the city, which until then had only been provided with rainwater or water brought by water carriers.

== Bibliography ==
- Casella de Calderón, Elisa (1991). Plaza General Lavalle. Revista Buenos Aires nos cuenta #19, First Edition. ISBN 987-9105-14-1.
- Boragno, Susana H. (2007). "Revista: Historias de la Ciudad de Buenos Aires, Los 150 años del primer ferrocarril argentino". Historias de la Ciudad: Una Revista de Buenos Aires. Lulemar. ISSN 1514-8793.
- Cutolo, Vicente (1994). Buenos Aires: Historia de los barrios de Buenos Aires. Buenos Aires: Elche. ISBN 950-99212-2-X.
- Crónica Histórica Argentina, Volumes IV and V, (1968) Ed. Codex
- "Nuestra primer locomotora: La Porteña y el Ferrocarril Oeste" on Ferro Aficionados Argentinos website (Archive), 27 Oct 2009
