= Trenque Lauquen =

City in Buenos Aires Province, Argentina

- City
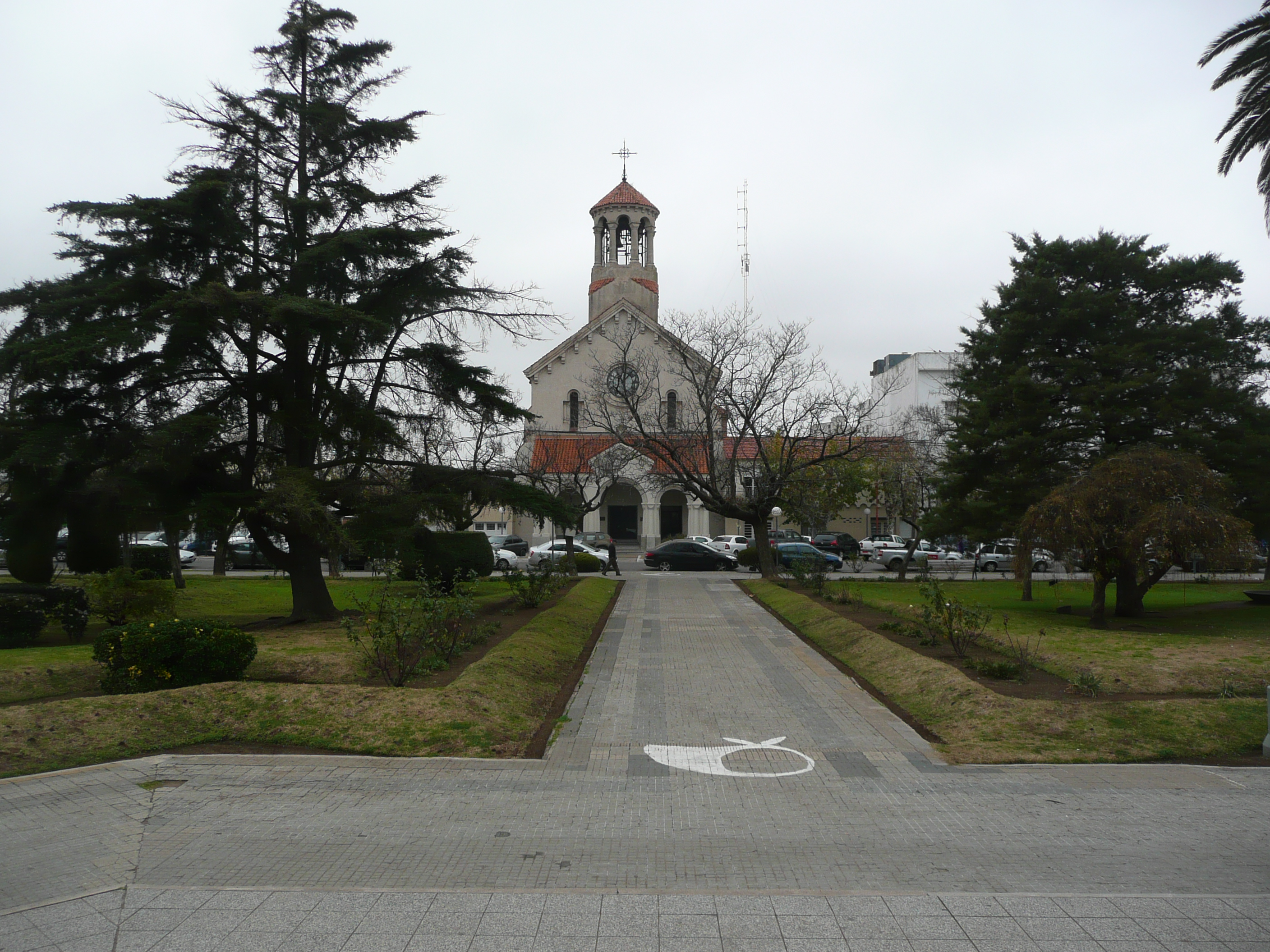

- Location in Argentina
- Coordinates: 35°58′S 62°42′W
- Country: Argentina
- Province: Buenos Aires
- Partido: Trenque Lauquen
- Founded: 1875
- Elevation: 80 m (260 ft)

Population (2018 census)
  - Total: 46,019
- CPA Base: B 6400
- Area code: +54 2392
- Website: /www.trenquelauquen.gov.ar/

Trenque Lauquen is a city in the west of the province of Buenos Aires, Argentina, 444 km (276 mi) from Buenos Aires City and 80 km (50 mi) from the border with the province of La Pampa, on the intersection of National Routes 5 and 33. Trenque Lauquen is the largest city of the district (partido) of the same name, and has a population of about 40,000 inhabitants as per the 2001 census [INDEC].

The name of the city means "Round Lagoon" in the Mapuche language. It was founded on 12 April 1876 by the advancing troops of Colonel Conrado Excelso Villegas, under orders from the Minister of War Adolfo Alsina, as the center of operations of the North Division of the Border Commandancy, during the Conquest of the Desert (the campaign to subject the territories originally occupied by aboriginal tribes to the government of Buenos Aires). The partido was officially created on 28 July 1886.

The city is served by Ñanco Lauquen Airport.

== Climate ==
Similar to the rest of the Pampas, Trenque Lauquen has a temperate climate. Under the Köppen climate classification system, Trenque Lauquen has a humid subtropical climate (Cfa) with hot summers and cool winters.

Climate data for Trenque Lauquen (1941–1950)
Month	Jan	Feb	Mar	Apr	May	Jun	Jul	Aug	Sep	Oct	Nov	Dec	Year
Record high °C (°F)	42.0 (107.6)	42.0 (107.6)	36.0 (96.8)	34.4 (93.9)	28.0 (82.4)	26.0 (78.8)	27.7 (81.9)	29.6 (85.3)	36.7 (98.1)	34.0 (93.2)	38.7 (101.7)	41.3 (106.3)	42.0 (107.6)
Mean daily maximum °C (°F)	32.4 (90.3)	31.1 (88.0)	26.1 (79.0)	23.3 (73.9)	19.8 (67.6)	15.3 (59.5)	14.7 (58.5)	17.0 (62.6)	20.0 (68.0)	24.0 (75.2)	28.0 (82.4)	31.6 (88.9)	23.6 (74.5)
Daily mean °C (°F)	24.0 (75.2)	22.7 (72.9)	18.8 (65.8)	15.8 (60.4)	11.9 (53.4)	8.8 (47.8)	8.2 (46.8)	9.7 (49.5)	12.8 (55.0)	16.3 (61.3)	20.1 (68.2)	23.3 (73.9)	16.0 (60.8)
Mean daily minimum °C (°F)	16.2 (61.2)	15.7 (60.3)	13.0 (55.4)	9.7 (49.5)	6.8 (44.2)	4.0 (39.2)	3.0 (37.4)	3.7 (38.7)	6.3 (43.3)	9.2 (48.6)	12.2 (54.0)	15.0 (59.0)	9.6 (49.3)
Record low °C (°F)	7.0 (44.6)	5.6 (42.1)	3.4 (38.1)	0.4 (32.7)	−4.0 (24.8)	−8.6 (16.5)	−9.4 (15.1)	−6.3 (20.7)	−4.2 (24.4)	−1.0 (30.2)	2.0 (35.6)	3.4 (38.1)	−9.4 (15.1)
Average precipitation mm (inches)	60 (2.4)	80 (3.1)	130 (5.1)	51 (2.0)	45 (1.8)	34 (1.3)	30 (1.2)	27 (1.1)	44 (1.7)	81 (3.2)	80 (3.1)	82 (3.2)	744 (29.3)
Source: Sistema de Clasificación Bioclimática Mundial
