= Neighbourhoods of Buenos Aires =

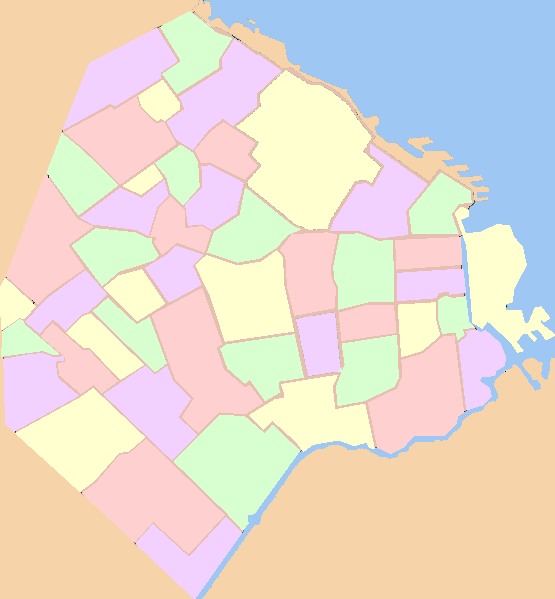

Buenos Aires, the autonomous city and capital of Argentina, is composed of 48 neighbourhoods (locally known as barrios). Since 2008, the city is also legally divided into communes (comunas), each one including one or more barrios. Among the most visited and populated barrios are Palermo, Recoleta, Puerto Madero, Belgrano, San Telmo, La Boca, Monserrat and Caballito. Sectors of the city are also traditionally known as neighbourhoods by the inhabitants of Buenos Aires, but not officially by the authorities of the city; some examples are Barrio Chino, Barrio Norte and the Microcentro.

== List of neighbourhoods ==
In alphabetical order, with the corresponding population and the commune they are grouped in.

Name	Area		Population	Commune	Density	
Name	km^{2}	sq mi	Population	Commune	per km^{2}	per sq mi
Agronomía	2.1	0.81	13,963	15	6,649.05	17,221.0
Almagro	4.1	1.58	128,206	5	31,269.76	80,988.3
Balvanera	4.4	1.70	137,521	3	31,254.77	80,949.5
Barracas	7.6	2.93	73,377	4	9,654.87	25,006.0
Belgrano	6.8	2.63	126,816	13	18,649.41	48,301.8
Boedo	2.6	1.00	45,563	5	17,524.23	45,387.5
Caballito	6.8	2.63	170,309	6	25,045.44	64,867.4
Chacarita	3.1	1.20	25,778	15	8,315.48	21,537.0
Coghlan	1.3	0.50	18,021	12	13,862.31	35,903.2
Colegiales	2.3	0.89	52,391	13	22,778.70	58,996.6
Constitución	2.1	0.81	41,894	1	19,949.52	51,669.0
Flores	7.8	3.01	142,695	7	18,294.23	47,381.8
Floresta	2.3	0.89	37,247	10	16,194.35	41,943.2
La Boca	3.1	1.20	43,413	4	14,004.19	36,270.7
La Paternal	2.2	0.85	19,058	15	8,662.73	22,436.4
Liniers	4.3	1.66	42,083	9	9,786.74	25,347.5
Mataderos	7.3	2.82	62,206	9	8,521.37	22,070.2
Monserrat	2.2	0.85	39,175	1	17,806.82	46,119.5
Monte Castro	2.6	1.00	32,782	10	12,608.46	32,655.8
Nueva Pompeya	6.2	2.39	60,465	4	9,752.42	25,258.7
Núñez	4.5	1.74	49,019	13	10,893.11	28,213.0
Palermo	15.9	6.14	225,245	14	14,166.35	36,690.7
Parque Avellaneda	5.1	1.97	51,678	9	10,132.94	26,244.2
Parque Chacabuco	3.8	1.47	54,638	7	14,378.42	37,239.9
Parque Chas	1.4	0.54	18,926	15	13,518.57	35,012.9
Parque Patricios	3.7	1.43	37,791	4	10,213.78	26,453.6
Puerto Madero	2.2	0.85	6,629	1	3,013.18	7,804.1
Recoleta	5.9	2.28	165,494	2	28,049.83	72,648.7
Retiro	2.8	1.08	38,635	1	13,798.21	35,737.2
Saavedra	5.6	2.16	48,956	12	8,742.14	22,642.0
San Cristóbal	2.1	0.81	46,494	3	22,140.00	57,342.3
San Nicolás	2.3	0.89	28,667	1	12,463.91	32,281.4
San Telmo	1.2	0.46	23,198	1	19,331.67	50,068.8
Vélez Sársfield	2.4	0.93	34,084	10	14,201.67	36,782.2
Versalles	1.4	0.54	13,556	10	9,682.86	25,078.5
Villa Crespo	3.6	1.39	83,646	15	23,235.00	60,178.4
Villa del Parque	3.4	1.31	55,502	11	16,324.12	42,279.3
Villa Devoto	6.4	2.47	67,712	11	10,580.00	27,402.1
Villa General Mitre	2.2	0.85	34,204	11	15,547.27	40,267.2
Villa Lugano	9.0	3.47	108,170	8	12,018.89	31,128.8
Villa Luro	2.6	1.00	31,859	10	12,253.46	31,736.3
Villa Ortúzar	1.8	0.69	21,256	15	11,808.89	30,584.9
Villa Pueyrredón	3.3	1.27	38,558	12	11,684.24	30,262.0
Villa Real	1.3	0.50	13,681	10	10,523.85	27,256.6
Villa Riachuelo	4.1	1.58	13,995	8	3,413.41	8,840.7
Villa Santa Rita	2.2	0.85	32,248	11	14,658.18	37,964.5
Villa Soldati	8.6	3.32	39,477	8	4,590.35	11,889.0
Villa Urquiza	5.4	2.08	85,587	12	15,849.44	41,049.9

== Informal neighbourhood names ==
The name Barrio Norte refers to the area around Avenida Santa Fe, encompassing parts of Retiro, Recoleta, and Palermo.

The name Barrio Sur was used in the past to encompass the southern neighbourhoods. This name has mostly fallen out of use, but survives in the lyrics of the tango Sur, which refer to specific places in Nueva Pompeya and Boedo, and in the short story "The South" by Jorge Luis Borges, where the conventional wisdom is recalled that "the South begins when crossing Rivadavia Avenue".

Abasto is sometimes used to refer to the zone around the Abasto market (now a shopping mall), many times in association with the life of singer Carlos Gardel. It encompasses north-western Balvanera and north-eastern Almagro.

Congreso is the area around Congress square, encompassing southeastern Balvanera, northern San Cristóbal and western Monserrat.

Catalinas Norte is the high-rise district next to Retiro transportation center and to the financial district, while Catalinas Sur is used (quite rarely) for the lowlands south of San Telmo (notably the area around Cosme Argerich hospital and at the bottom of Parque Lezama).

Palermo is the largest barrio by area and has several informal subdivisions; Palermo Viejo is the name usually given to the area between Coronel Díaz, Córdoba, Scalabrini Ortíz and Güemes; Palermo Chico and Barrio Parque, the most upmarket part of Palermo, is on Palermo's north-eastern edge, includes the National Museum of Decorative Arts and the Museum of Latin American Art, and many of the wealthy and famous old homes some now used as Ambassador's residences; Palermo Soho, the city's fashion district, refers to Plaza Julio Cortázar and its surroundings; Palermo Hollywood is a distinctive quarter located in the northern edge of the barrio where radio and television stations, movie producers and workshops have settled in the late 1990s. Las Cañitas refers to a few blocks around the Campo Argentino de Polo, crowded with trendy bars, fancy restaurants and nightclubs. Palermo Queens is used sometimes to refer to the parts of Villa Crespo close to Palermo Viejo. Other than Palermo Viejo and Palermo Chico, these names are of recent vintage (1990s and later) and are related to the gentrification process that Palermo and its peripheral areas are undergoing.

Parque Centenario is sometimes used to refer to the area around Centenario park, at the limit of Almagro, Caballito, and Villa Crespo.

The southern parts of Flores were reclaimed from swampland, and the names Bajo Flores and Bañado de Flores are used for these areas.

Within Belgrano, there are Belgrano "C" and "R" (widely and incorrectly believed to signify "commercial" and "residential", respectively) and Bajo Belgrano ("Belgrano lowlands"), which since the late 1990s includes a small Chinatown.

A tango song named "Cien barrios porteños" (transl. The 100 barrios of Buenos Aires), sung by Alberto Castillo, is sometimes invoked (informally) to support the claim that there are indeed a hundred neighbourhoods in the city. This number may be reached by including some suburbs in the tally.
