= Maldonado Stream =

Stream in Buenos Aires, Argentina

Coordinates: 34°35′15″S 58°26′14″W

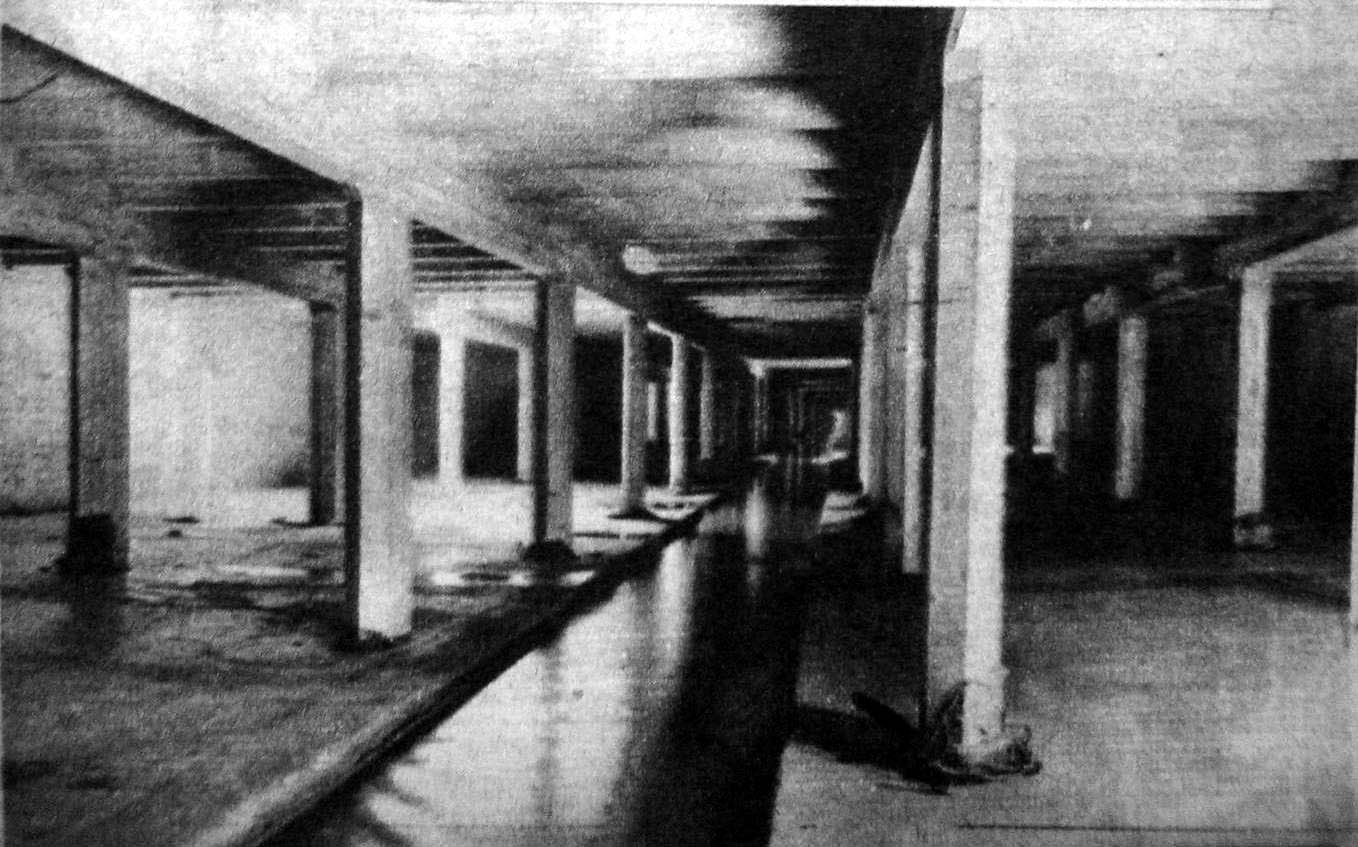
Interior view of the Maldonado drain

The Maldonado Stream (Arroyo Maldonado) is an underground storm sewer in the city Buenos Aires, Argentina, that runs below Juan B. Justo Avenue. Originally a stream draining into the Río de la Plata, its 21.3 kilometres (13.2 mi) length goes through 10 of the 47 barrios of the city: Versalles, Liniers, Villa Luro, Vélez Sarsfield, Floresta, Villa Santa Rita, Villa Mitre, Caballito, Villa Crespo, and Palermo.

The stream was one of the natural limits of the city, before the Belgrano and Flores neighborhoods were incorporated. It is named after the legend of La Maldonado, a woman who arrived with Pedro de Mendoza in 1536, and was abandoned in the plain, on the margins of the stream.

The stream became a garbage dump in time, and during the rainy season became a polluted waterway made dangerous because of its overflows. The authorities decided via a municipal ordinance on August 25, 1924, to tube the stream as a final solution to all the problems that caused in a growing city, and in 1928 excavations started. The Maldonado drainage system, one of the most significant public works ever built in Buenos Aires, was designed as a part of a broader drainage system in the city; it was commissioned and designed by the state-owned Obras Sanitarias de la Nación and engineered by German firm Siemens-Schuckert.

The excavation phase required hundreds of workers and machinery. The second phase, begun in 1929, consisted of rising columns to support a gigantic slab, for which 5000 tons of rebar, 20000 tons of cement, 55000 tons of sand, and 70000 tons of gravel were used. Following these tubing and drainage works completed in 1933, a large packed soil road was erected over the stream in 1934. This road was re-inaugurated on July 9, 1937, as Juan B. Justo Avenue.

Persistent seasonal flooding along the northwest stretch of the former Maldonado Stream caused by drainage overflow (which affected up to 266,000 people yearly) prompted Mayor Aníbal Ibarra in 2005 to announce complementary drain works. Ghella, a local contractor, presented the winning bid in 2007, and work began on the alleviating tunnels the following year. The first of the two new tunnels was completed in 2011, and measured 4.6 kilometres (2.9 mi) in length. Work on the second, larger tunnel began in 2010 and was completed in 2012; it measured 9.8 kilometres (6.1 mi) in length, required 200,000 cubic meters (7 million cubic feet) of cement, and cost US$200 million.
