= Versalles, Buenos Aires =

Versalles
- Neighborhood of Buenos Aires
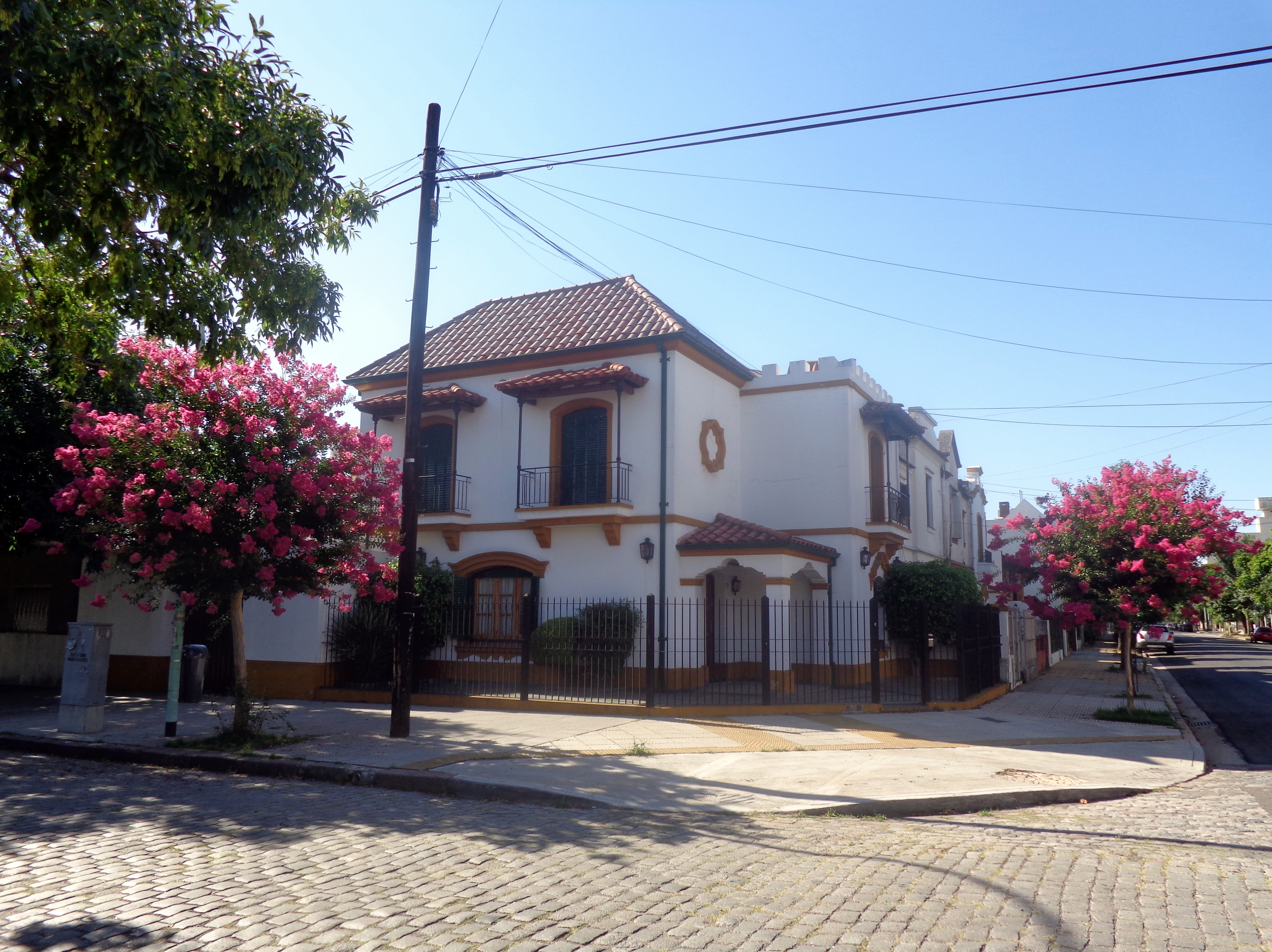
- Madero Street

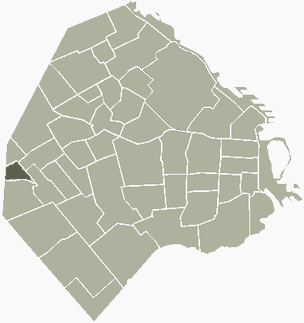
- Location of Versalles within Buenos Aires
- Coordinates: 34°37′40″S 58°31′26″W
- Country: Argentina
- Autonomous City: Buenos Aires
- Comuna: C10

Area
  - Total: 1.5 km^{2} (0.58 sq mi)

Population
  - Total: 14,178
  - Density: 9,452/km^{2} (24,480/sq mi)
- Time zone: UTC-3 (ART)

Versalles (also Versailles) is a barrio (district) of Buenos Aires, Argentina. It is part of Commune 10 along with Villa Real, Monte Castro, Floresta, Velez Sarsfield and Villa Luro. Versalles is located on the western end of Buenos Aires; its boundaries are marked by the following streets: Nogoyá, Irigoyen, Juan B. Justo Avenue, and the General Paz Expressway.

== History ==
The area around Versalles was part of a vast estate owned in the 18th century by Pedro Fernández de Castro; the neighboring ward of Monte Castro was later named in his honor. His daughter, Mercedes, subdivided the estate after his death, and the lot that later became Versalles was later owned by Manuel de Sarratea, one of the founding fathers of modern-day Argentina.

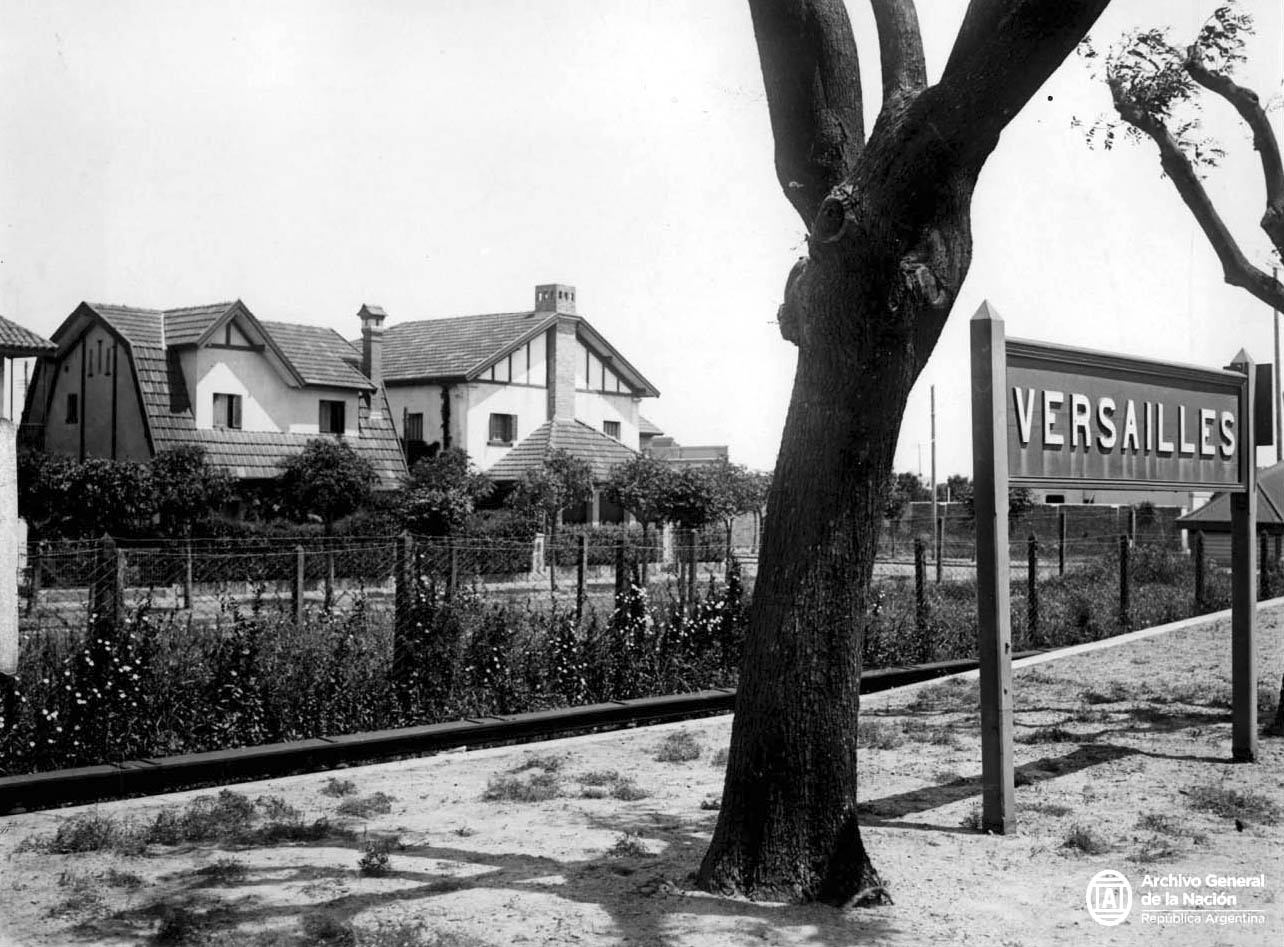
The former Versalles Station

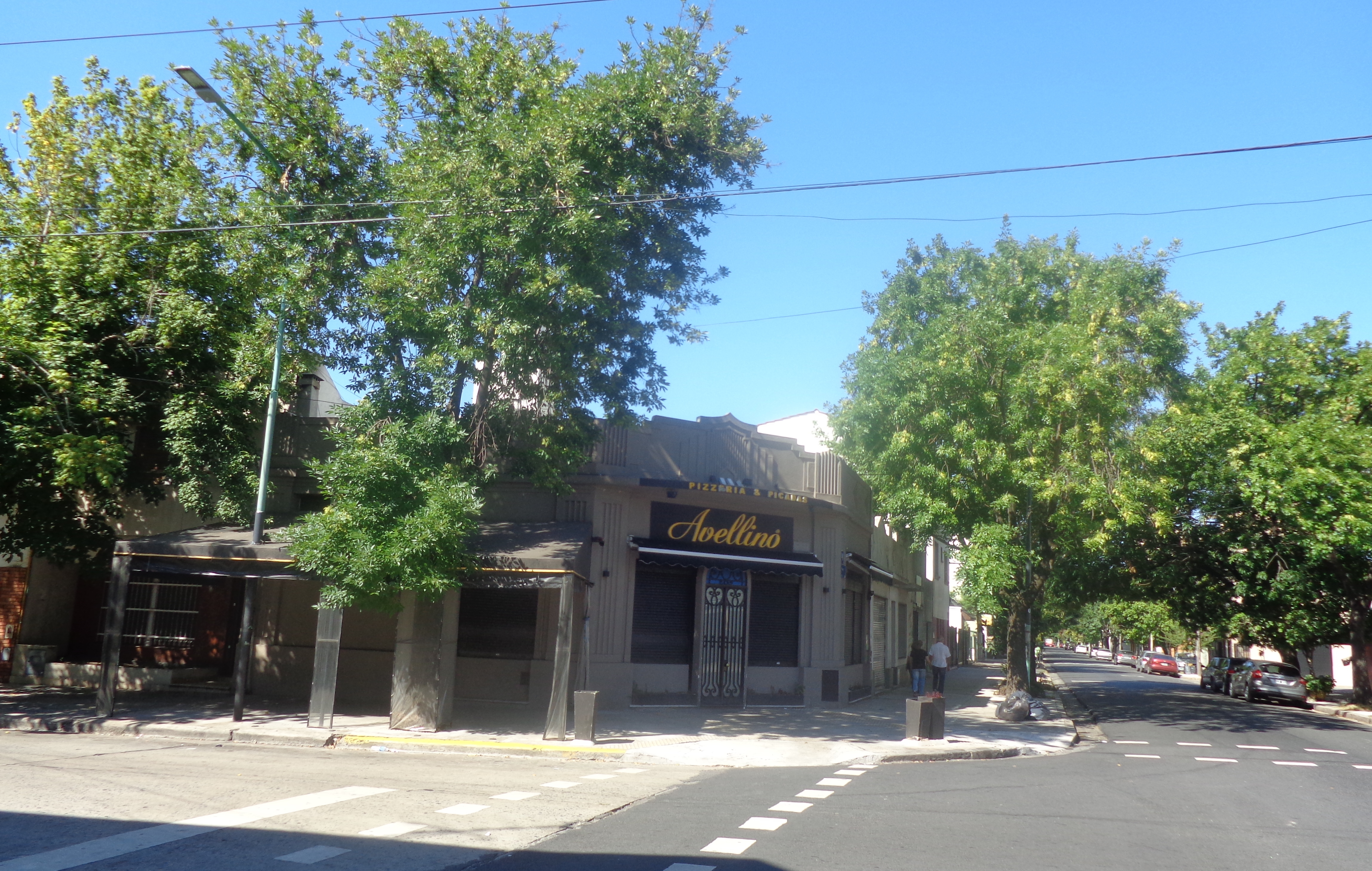
The Oscar-nominated 2001 film Son of the Bride was filmed here

Versalles has a neighborhood with characteristics of English architecture, due to the large number of immigrants who settled in the neighborhood to work on the railroad.

A residential neighborhood emerged when in the early 20th century the Compañía de Tierras del Oeste (Western Lands Company) purchased the land from the last farming landowners in the area, the Rodríguez Visillac and Massini families. The Buenos Aires Western Railway inaugurated a station in the area in 1911. The Western Lands Company physician, Dr. José Guerrico, had recently returned from Paris, and inspired by his travels, suggested the station and neighborhood be named after the Château de Versailles (Versalles, in Spanish). The Western Railway line from Once Station to Moreno remained the suburban district's primary transport link until the opening of General Paz Avenue in 1941 (upgraded to an expressway in 1997). The Once-Moreno line was curtailed in 1952 to make way for Juan B. Justo Avenue, whose western stretch along Versalles was completed in 1953.

Versalles retains a suburban character as one of the least densely populated, greenest, and quietest wards in Buenos Aires. Many of its street names recall the Caldén, Aguaribay (Schinus), and Caranday trees that adorn its parks and sidewalks. Some of its notable institutions include the Versalles Athletic Club (1921), the Church of Our Lady of Health (1933), the Belisario Roldán Library (1934), and the Versalles Popular Athenæum (1938). The first supermarket in Buenos Aires, Supermercado Gigante S.A., was opened in Versalles in 1965.

== Movie settings ==
Its two largest parks are the Paseo de Versalles (built over the former rail line in the 1960s) and City of Banff Park. The 1985 hit comedy, Waiting for the Hearse was filmed there and in a nearby Art Deco house on Echenagucía Street; and the restaurant featured in the Oscar-nominated Son of the Bride (2001) was filmed in the Avellino Pizzería on the corner of Nogoyá and Gallardo.
