= Luro =

Luro may refer to:

== Places ==
- Lurö, an island in Säffle Municipality, Värmland County, Sweden
- Luro Administrative Post, an administrative post in the Lautém Municipality of Timor-Leste
- Luro, Luro, a suco in Luro Administrative Post
- Luro or Lygra, an island in Alver Municipality in Vestland County, Norway
- Villa Luro, a barrio (district) of Buenos Aires, Argentina

== People ==
- Horatio Luro, a thoroughbred horse racing trainer in the United States
- Pedro Luro, a French man who emigrated to Argentina to help colonize the Buenos Aires province
