= Vélez Sársfield (barrio) =

Coordinates: 34°38′S 58°29′W

- Neighborhood of Buenos Aires
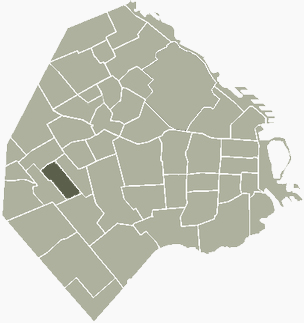
- Location of Velez Sarsfield within Buenos Aires
- Country: Argentina
- Autonomous City: Buenos Aires
- Comuna: C10

Area
  - Total: 2.4 km^{2} (0.93 sq mi)

Population
  - Total: 36,056
  - Density: 15,000/km^{2} (39,000/sq mi)
- Time zone: UTC-3 (ART)

Vélez Sársfield is a barrio or district in the western part of Buenos Aires, Argentina, located in the area defined by the streets Segurola Avenue, Juan Agustín García, Lope de Vega Avenue, Juan B. Justo Ave., Corro Ave., Medina, Juan Bautista Alberdi Ave. and Mariano Acosta.

== Description and history ==
The barrio was named after Dalmacio Vélez Sársfield, the 19th century author of the Civil Code of Argentina, and a translator of Latin poems into Spanish. It is a typical low-rise housing area, that like many others was mainly populated during the urban explosion at the beginning of the 20th century.

It is currently a middle-class neighborhood, among whose largely low-rise housing there are some small factories and warehouses. The first division football (soccer) club CA Vélez Sársfield is in fact based in the nearby barrio of Liniers, in the José Amalfitani Stadium, and not in Vélez Sársfield itself.

The Maldonado Stream (Spanish: Arroyo Maldonado) runs through Vélez Sársfield, which in the early 20th century was culverted. The main avenue in the barrio, named after Juan B. Justo, runs over the stream. The Maldonado was at one point a natural boundary for the city limits of Buenos Aires, before the towns of Flores and Belgrano emerged (which are now also barrios).
