= Colectivo 92 =

Bus route in Buenos Aires

92
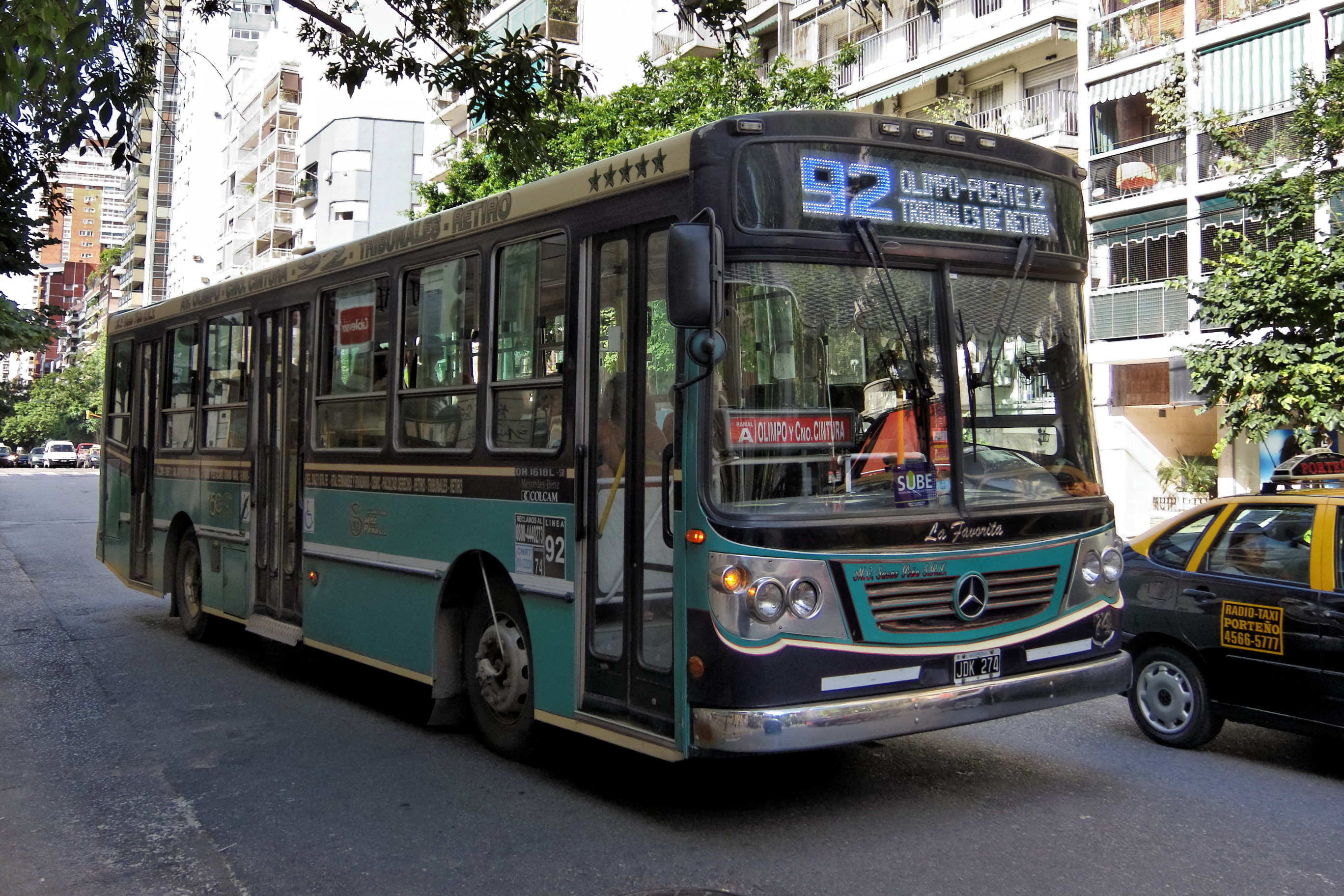

Overview
- Operator: Micro Omnibus Sáenz Peña S.R.L.
- Began service: 1959

Route
- Start: Retiro
- End: Esteban Echeverría Partido; Nueve de Abril

Bus route 92 of Buenos Aires runs between April 9, in the Esteban Echeverría partido with the Buenos Aires Railway Hospital (Hospital Ferroviario de Buenos Aires), located in the Retiro neighbourhood.

== History ==
Bus route 92 in Buenos Aires has its origins in 1959. It was created in the year as bus route 292 and originally linked Facultad de Derecho with Avenida Del Trabajo (now Eva Perón) and General Paz. Bus route 292 was extended to Marinos del Fournier station in 1961 and in 1962, it extended its other end to Retiro and the Ferroviario Hospital respectively. Its colors chosen when it was created are the ones it still maintains today, just as the chosen company name was “Micro Ómnibus Sáenz Peña”.

On January 1, 1969, the line was renumbered to 92 as part of bus route number geographical allocation programs, in the 1970s another extension was made at its southern end of the route, making the line reach Bridge 12 (Ricchieri Highway and Provincial Route 4). During these years it was always characterized by being an excellent line in its services, another extension would come in 1989 making it reach Avenida Olimpo and Camino de Cintura. Placing the yard there as well as its offices and others, being an extension that characterized the line in recent times.

The bus route was most notable for being involved in the 2011 Flores rail crash. Video evidence revealed that the bus driver, who was killed in the accident, ignored warning flash lights and bells on José Artigas street and drove around a partly lowered crossing barrier (partially due to the fact that these had been in a state of constant activation for some time).

== Route ==
Route 92 runs via these branches:

- Service A: Railway Hospital - Retiro - Barrio 9 de Abril
- Service B: Railway Hospital - Retiro - Puente 12
- Service C: Railway Hospital – Eva Peron Avenue and General Paz Avenue
