= José Amalfitani Stadium =

Football stadium in Buenos Aires, Argentina

- Estadio José Amalfitani
- El Fortín

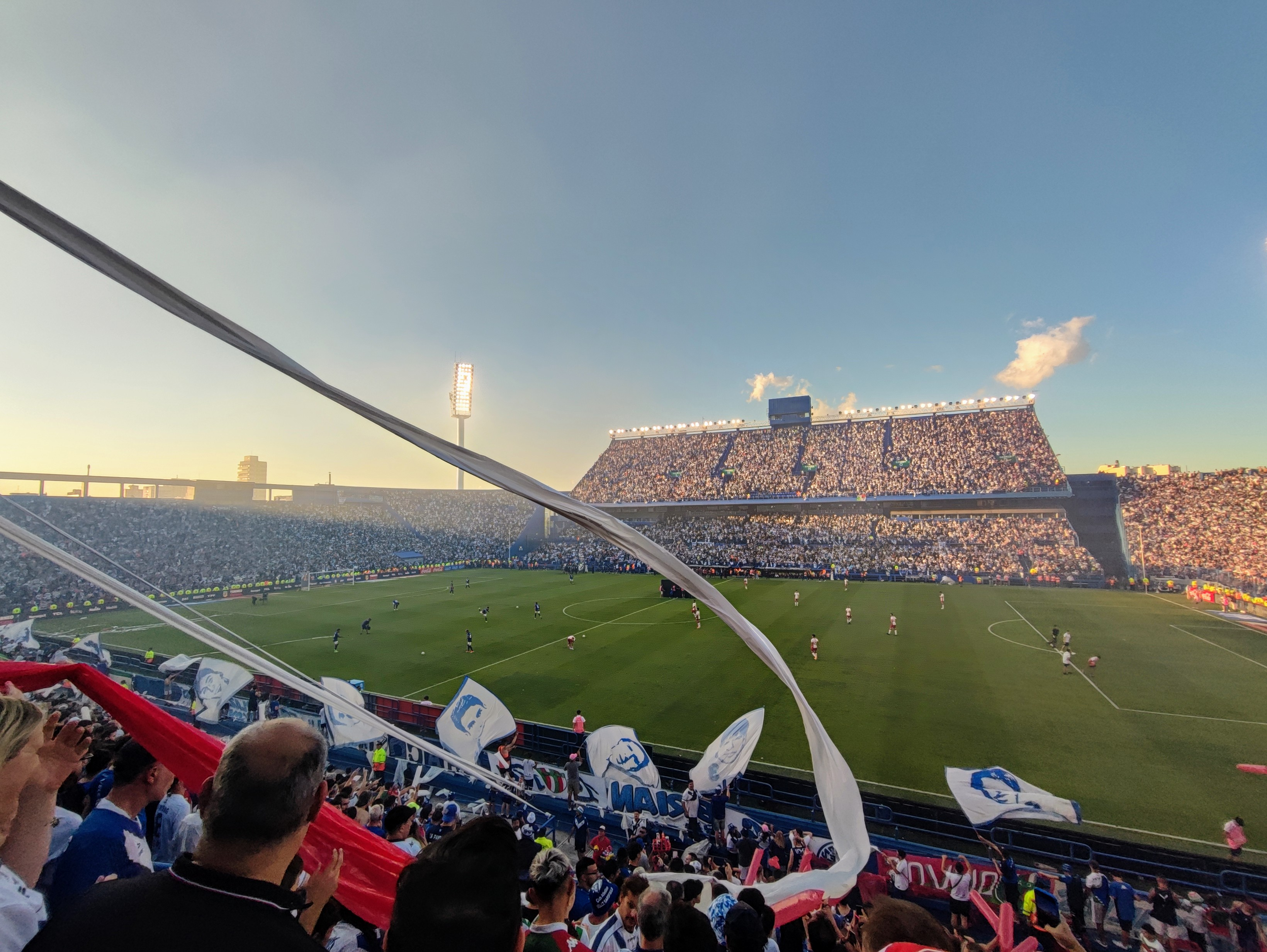
- View of the stadium during a Vélez Sarsfield match in December 2024.
- Interactive map of José Amalfitani Stadium
- Full name: José Amalfitani Stadium
- Location: Avenida Juan B. Justo, 8900, Buenos Aires, Argentina
- Coordinates: 34°38′7″S 58°31′15″W
- Owner: C.A. Vélez Sarsfield
- Capacity: 49,540
- Surface: Grass
- Scoreboard: Yes
- Field size: 105 x 70 m
- Current use: Football; Rugby; Concerts

Construction
- Built: 1941–43
- Opened: April 11, 1943; 83 years ago
- Renovated: 1951
- Expanded: 1978

Tenants
- Vélez Sarsfield (1951–present); Argentina rugby team (1986–present); San Isidro Club (1987) (Note: Only used the venue during their matches v foreign national teams that were touring Argentina.); Banco Nación (1990); Jaguares (2015–2020)

Website
- velez.com.ar/club/estadio

The José Amalfitani Stadium (also known as Estadio Vélez Sarsfield, nicknamed El Fortín de Liniers) is a football stadium located in the Liniers neighborhood of Buenos Aires, Argentina, near Liniers railway station. The venue is the home of the Argentine Primera División club Vélez Sarsfield. The stadium was named after José Amalfitani, who was president of Vélez Sarsfield for 30 years.

The stadium was built between 1941 and 1943 and inaugurated in April 1943 in a friendly match between Vélez Sarsfield and River Plate. It was then renovated and enlarged later in preparation for the 1978 FIFA World Cup. The stadium has a capacity of 49,540 spectators, although it does not provide seating for all of them like most Argentine stadia.

The Estadio José Amalfitani is also the national stadium for the Argentina national rugby union team (Los Pumas). Although the team plays test matches throughout the country, their highest-profile tests (such as against the New Zealand All Blacks) are usually held here. The Jaguares, a team that participated in the Super Rugby league from 2016 to 2020, played its home games at the stadium.

== History ==
=== Predecessors ===
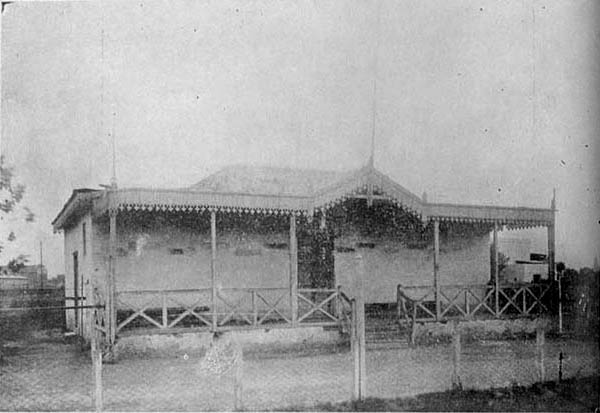
View of the first seating area and club house, 1922

During its first years of existence, Vélez Sarsfield football team played its games in vacant lands of the neighborhood, with removable goal posts. In 1913 the Argentine Football Association ordered the club to host its home games at a bigger stadium so the club moved to the Juan Martín Figallo's (a neighbor) country house on Rodó and Escalada streets. Figallo rented the club part of his land.

In 1914, the club called an assembly to discuss the possibility to rent lands on better places. The club got a land behind Villa Luro station, between Cortina and Bacacay streets. But the definitive stadium would be built in 1922, when the club rented a land to López Bancalari Brothers on Guardia Nacional street. The club started to build a grandstand while the team continued playing in Villa Luro and other fields, until the construction finished. Works were ready in 1924, when the club inaugurated its first stadium with a grandstand, lockers, coffee shop, personnel room and secretary. The stadium was officially opened in a friendly match v River Plate.

New grandstands were built between 1926 and 1927, completing the four sides of the stadium and therefore increasing its capacity. In 1935, the first match with artificial lighting was played at Vélez Sarsfield venue. The local team defeated Platense 4–2. The end of an era came in 1940 when the club was intimated to leave the lands where the stadium was located due to the rental contract had expired.

=== Current venue ===
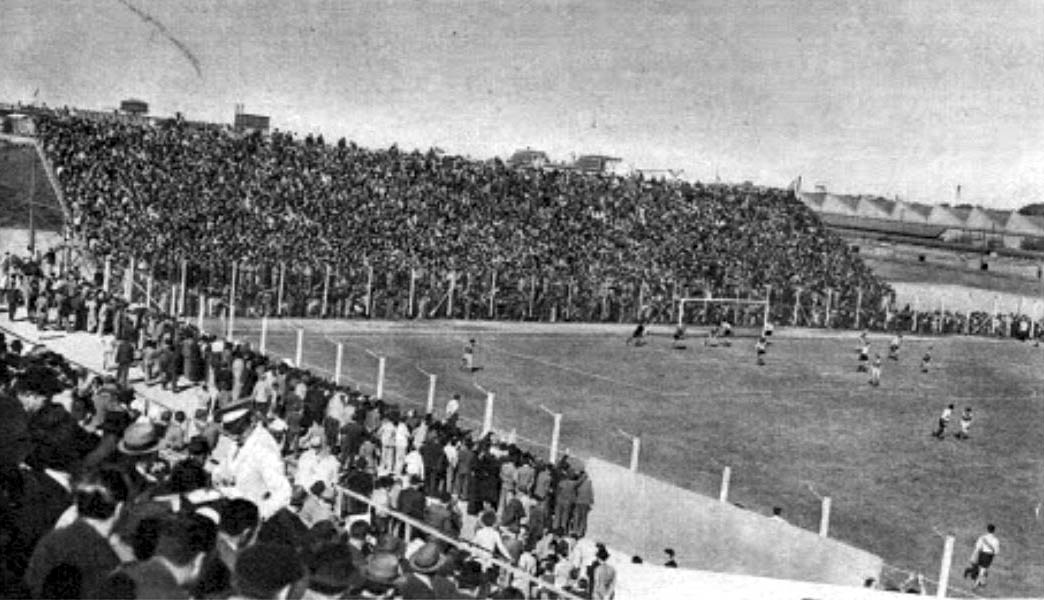
Inauguration of the stadium, 11 April 1943

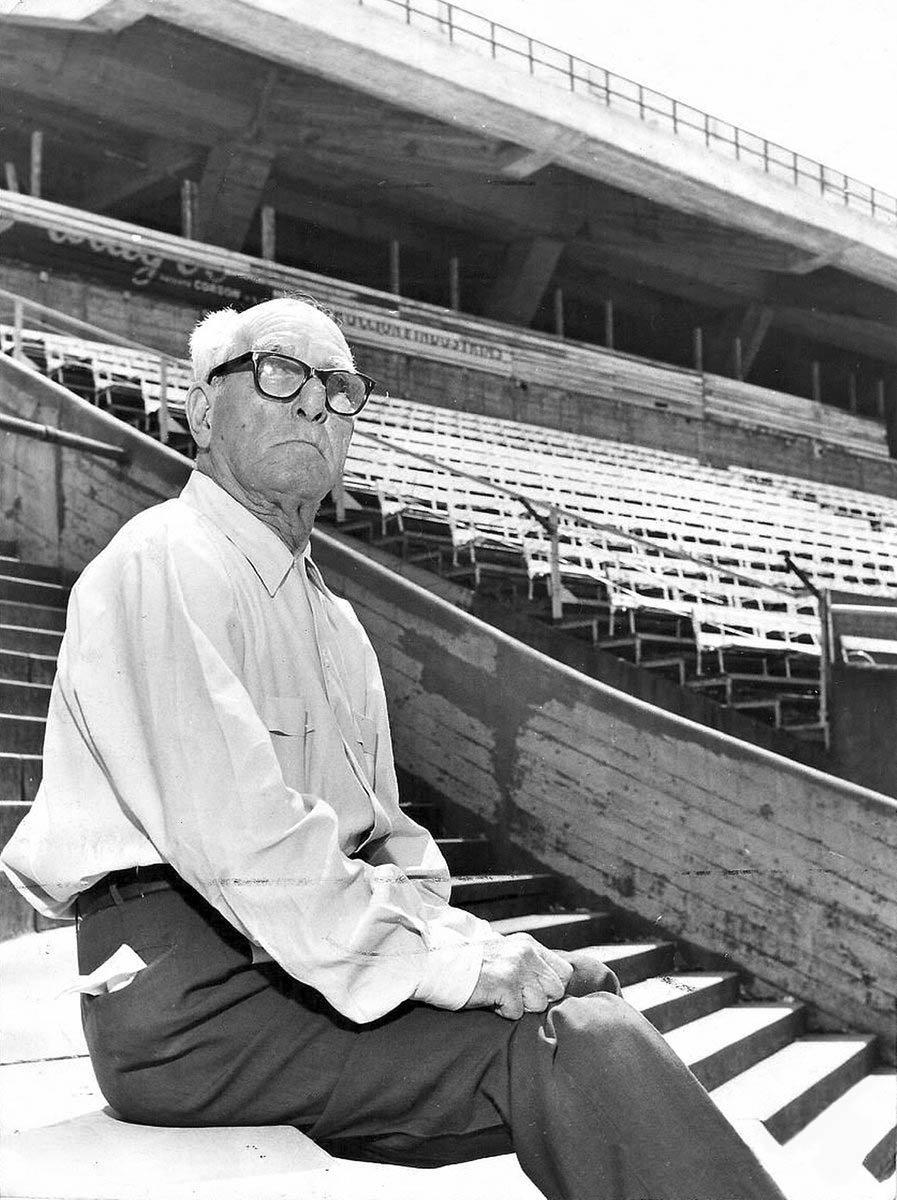
President of Vélez Sársfield José Amalfitani in the stadium

After suffering relegation from Primera División in 1940, Vélez was sacked from the Villa Luro ground they were renting. Three years later, in 1941, the club obtained the terrain of the current stadium, property of the Buenos Aires Western Railway. The ground was a swamp of the Maldonado Stream, where construction was difficult. However, the club's president José Amalfitani led the construction of the first stadium at the site, which was inaugurated on April 11, 1943. The new stadium used the same wood stands from the old Villa Luro stadium, and was inaugurated in a 2–2 draw with River Plate. Vélez striker Juan José Ferraro scored the first goal in the stadium's history (the others were scored by Ángel Fernández for Vélez and Adolfo Pedernera twice for River). The concrete stands were inaugurated on April 22, 1951.

The stadium was renamed in honor of José Amalfitani on December 7, 1968. The following year, a modern lighting system by Siemens was installed, and the first of the upper stand sections was completed.

José Amalfitani Stadium was the first venue in South America with a lighting system, inaugurated in 1928. After the stadium was inaugurated, one of the members of Vélez Sarsfield executive committee, Raùl D'Onofrio (father of then president of River Plate Rodolfo D'Onofrio), came up with the idea of bring the lighting system used in baseball stadiums in the US that had impressed him. Nevertheless, the club later would sign an agreement with Germany-based company Siemens to be is supplier. José Amalfitani Stadium inaugurated its lighting system in 1969 in a match vs Brazilian Santos FC

Vélez Sarsfield drew an average home attendance of 41,646 in the 2024 Argentine Primera División.

== Events hosted ==
=== Football ===
==== 1978 FIFA World Cup ====
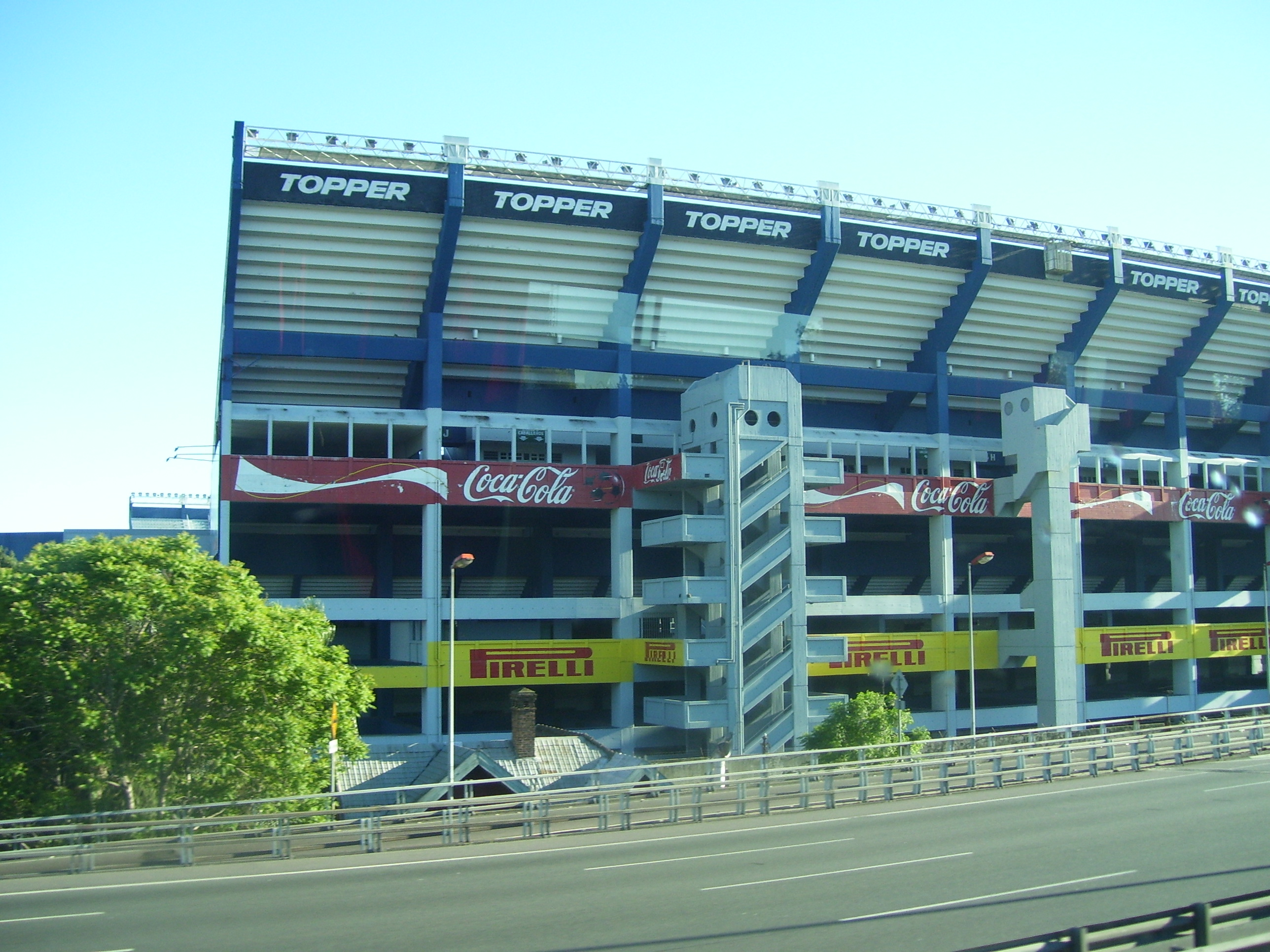
Exterior view of the stadium in 2006

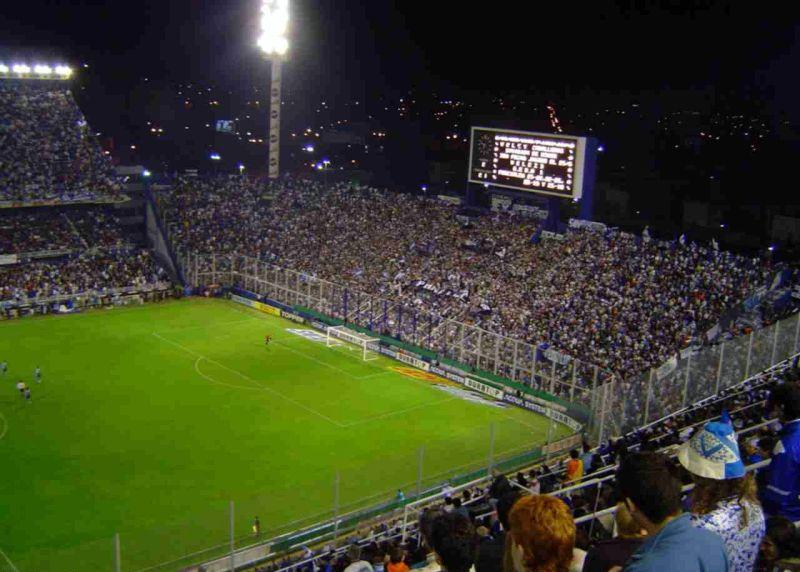
The stadium at night

The stadium was refurbished for the 1978 FIFA World Cup with the completion of press boxes and another section of upper stands, and hosted three games in the group stages.

Date	Round	Group	Team 1	Vs.	Team 2
June 3	1	3	Austria	2–1	Spain
June 7	1	3	Austria	1–0	Sweden
June 11	1	3	Spain	1–0	Sweden

==== 2001 FIFA World Youth Championship ====
Date	Round	Team 1	Vs.	Team 2
8 July	Final	Argentina	3–0	Ghana

==== Argentina friendly matches ====
Date	Rival	Res.
22 April 1974	Romania	2-1
5 May 1982	Bulgaria	2-1
23 June 1983	Chile	1-0
25 September 1984	Mexico	1-1
16 December 1987	Germany	1-0
13 March 1991	Mexico	0-0
27 March 1991	Brazil	3-3
21 December 1994	Romania	1-0
10 March 1998	Bulgaria	2-0

=== Rugby union ===
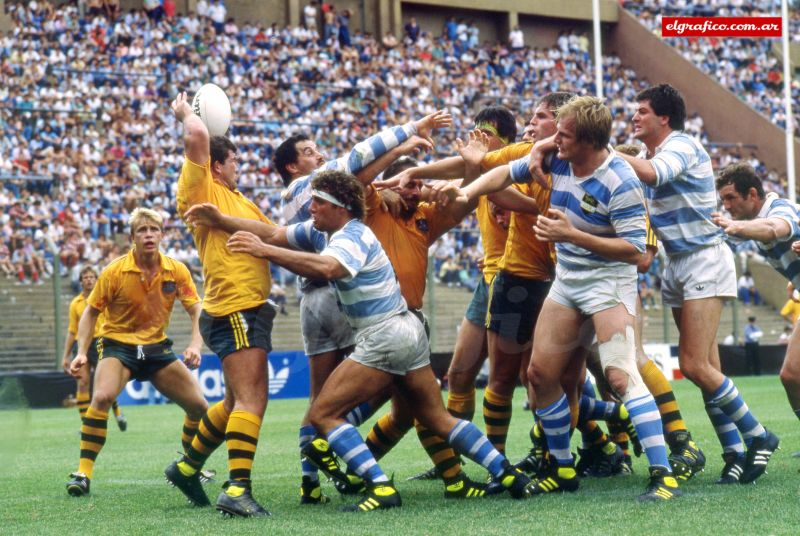
Argentine playing their second test v. Australia in 1987

The ground has also hosted the Argentina national team (Los Pumas) since 1986, when the side left to play at Ferro Carril Oeste Stadium (their home venue by then) searching for higher capacity stadiums.

When South Africa played Argentina in November 2005 at Vélez Sarsfield, they faced a strong Pumas side, which took a 20–16 lead into the half-time break, before fading in the second half and losing 34–23.

In the 2006 mid-year tests, the second test against Wales, saw the Pumas win 45–27, Argentina's largest win ever over Wales. The national squad next hosted the world's top team, the All Blacks. The New Zealanders survived an Argentine assault in the final minutes to hang on to win 25–19 and to deny Argentina a huge upset.

Los Pumas began their final preparation for the 2007 World Cup with a summer two-test series against visiting Ireland, including a 16–0 win at Vélez Sarsfield.

The José Amalfitani Stadium was the home ground for the Jaguares, an Argentine Super Rugby franchise that ran from 2015 to 2020.

==== Argentina test matches ====
Date	Rival	Res.	Score
31 May 1986	France	won	15–13
7 June 1986	France	lost	9–22
31 October 1987	Australia	tie	19–19
7 November 1987	Australia	won	27–19
18 June 1988	France	lost	15–18
25 June 1988	France	won	18–6
24 June 1989	Italy	won	21–16
28 July 1990	England	won	15–13
4 August 1990	England	lost	12–25
6 July 1991	New Zealand	lost	14–28
13 July 1991	New Zealand	lost	6–36
4 July 1992	France	lost	12–27
11 July 1992	France	lost	9–33
13 June 1998	France	lost	18–35
20 June 1998	France	lost	12–37
15 June 2002	France	won	28–27
22 June 2002	England	lost	18–26
14 June 2003	France	won	10–6
20 June 2003	France	won	33–32
4 December 2004	South Africa	lost	7–39
5 November 2005	South Africa	lost	23–34
17 June 2006	Wales	won	45–27
24 June 2006	New Zealand	lost	19–25
2 June 2007	Ireland	won	16–0
14 June 2008	Scotland	lost	14–26
26 June 2010	France	won	41–13
15 June 2013	England	lost	26–51
15 August 2015	South Africa	lost	12–26
1 October 2016	New Zealand	lost	17–36
30 September 2017	New Zealand	lost	10–36
29 September 2018	New Zealand	lost	17–35
21 July 2019	New Zealand	lost	16–20
23 August 2025	New Zealand	won	29–23
8 August 2026	South Africa	lost	10–17

==== Club matches ====
Date	Team	Score	Rival	Ref.
14 Jul 1990	Banco Nación	29–21	England	
10 Oct 1987	San Isidro Club	22–22	Australia	

== Concerts ==
The stadium has hosted many international concerts since the 1980s. English rock band Queen was the first to perform at Vélez Sarsfield –giving three concerts in February 1981– as part of The Game Tour to support their successful homonymous album. The visit of the band (which was at the peak of their career by then) had huge repercussions in Argentina, being widely covered by the media, and famous personalities –such as Diego Maradona– attending to their concerts.

José Amalfitani Stadium hosts events of up to 50,000 spectators.

Artist	Date	Tour
Queen	February 28, March 1 and 8, 1981	The Game Tour
Yes	February 1, 2 and 9, 1985	9012Live Tour
INXS	October 11, 1985	
Nina Hagen	October 12, 1985	
Tears for Fears	January 23, 1990	Seeds of Love
Bon Jovi	February 1, 1990	New Jersey Syndicate Tour
Erasure	March 31, 1990	Wild! Tour
Roxette	May 2 and 3, 1992	Join the Joyride! Tour
Nirvana	October 30, 1992	Nevermind Tour
Joe Cocker and Brian May	November 7, 1992	
The B-52's	November 8, 1992	
Duran Duran	April 30, 1993	1993-1994 The Dilate Your Mind Tour
Metallica	May 7 and 8, 1993	Nowhere Else to Roam
Santana	May 29, 1993	Milagro Tour
Peter Gabriel	October 2, 1993	Secret World Tour
Bon Jovi	November 12–14, 1993	I'll Sleep When I'm Dead Tour
Luis Miguel	November 19, 1993	Aries Tour
Aerosmith	January 17, 1994	Get a Grip Tour
INXS	March 4, 1994	Dirty Honeymoon Tour
Sting	March 25, 1994	Ten Summoner's Tales Tour
Depeche Mode	April 8, 1994	Exotic Tour/Summer Tour '94
Whitney Houston	April 16 & 17, 1994	The Bodyguard World Tour
Ramones	May 14, 1994	20th Anniversary Tour
Luis Miguel	November 11 & 12, 1994	Segundo Romance Tour
Testament	June 16, 1995	Low
Marilyn Manson	September 11, 1997	Dead to the World Tour
Luis Miguel	November 14–16, 1997	Romances Tour
Iron Maiden	December 12, 1998	Virtual XI World Tour
Luis Miguel	November 5–7, 1999	Amarte Es Un Placer Tour
Queens of the Stone Age	January 13, 2001	Rated R
Iron Maiden	January 13, 2001	Brave New World Tour
Red Hot Chili Peppers	January 24, 2001	Red Hot Chili Peppers 2001 Tour
Roger Waters	March 7, 2002	In the Flesh Tour
Luis Miguel	November 24 and 25, 2002	Mis Romances Tour
Luis Miguel	December 5–7 2003	33 Tour
Iron Maiden	January 11, 2004	Dance of Death World Tour
Luis Miguel	November 10–12, 2005	México En La Piel Tour
Shakira	November 24 and 25, 2006	Oral Fixation Tour
The Killers	November 2, 2007	Sam's Town Tour
Bob Dylan	March 15, 2008	Never Ending Tour 2008
Rod Stewart	April 11, 2008	Rocks His Greatest Hits Tour
Queen + Paul Rodgers	November 21, 2008	Rock the Cosmos Tour
Luis Miguel	November 27–30, 2008	Cómplices Tour
Peter Gabriel	March 22, 2009	Small Place
Guns N' Roses	March 22, 2010	Chinese Democracy Tour
Linkin Park	October 7, 2010	A Thousand Suns Tour
Luis Miguel	November 25–28, 2010	Luis Miguel Tour
Iron Maiden	April 8, 2011	The Final Frontier World Tour
Rod Stewart	October 22, 2011	Heart & Soul Tour
Elton John	March 2, 2013	40th Anniversary of the Rocket Man
Nickelback	September 26, 2013	Here and Now Tour
Bon Jovi	September 26, 2013	Because We Can: The Tour
Stevie Wonder	December 12, 2013	
One Direction	May 3 and 4, 2014	Where We Are Tour (One Direction)
No Te Va Gustar	April 11, 2015	
KISS	April 16, 2015	The KISS 40th Anniversary World Tour
Chayanne	April 25, 2015	En Todo Estaré Tour
Iron Maiden	March 15, 2016	The Book of Souls World Tour
Green Day	November 10, 2017	Revolution Radio Tour
Queens of the Stone Age	March 7, 2018	Villains World Tour
Foo Fighters	March 7, 2018	Concrete and Gold Tour
Shakira	October 25, 2018	El Dorado World Tour
Iron Maiden	October 12, 2019	Legacy of the Beast World Tour
Billy Idol	September 11, 2022	The Roadside Tour 2022
Green Day	September 11, 2022	Hella Mega Tour
Lali	March 4, 2023	Disciplina Tour
Karol G	April 26 & 27, 2024	Mañana Será Bonito Tour
Louis Tomlinson	may 18, 2024	Faith in the Future World Tour
Eric Clapton	September 20, 2024	
Emilia Mernes	October 12, 13, 18 & 19, 2024	.MP3 Tour
Lali	May 24 & 25, September 6 & 7, December 16, 2025	Lali Tour 2025
Shakira	December 8, 9 and 11, 2025	Las Mujeres Ya No Lloran World Tour

== See also ==
- List of football stadiums in Argentina
- List of association football stadiums by capacity
- Lists of stadiums

== Notes ==
Preceded by various venues in Germany	FIFA World Cup; Venue; 1978	Succeeded by various venues in Spain
Preceded by various venues in Nigeria	FIFA U-20 World Cup; Venue; 2001	Succeeded by various venues in United Arab Emirates
