= Estadio Islas Malvinas =

Football stadium in Buenos Aires, Argentina

Coordinates: 34°37′0″S 58°29′52″W

Islas Malvinas Stadium
- Estadio Islas Malvinas
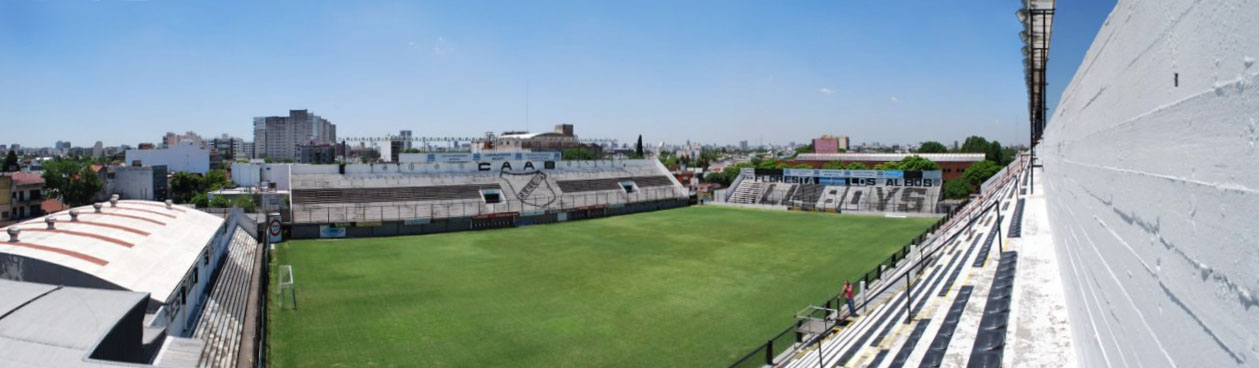
- The stadium in 2013
- Interactive map of Islas Malvinas Stadium
- Address: Av. Álvarez Jonte 4180; Buenos Aires; Argentina
- Owner: C.A. All Boys
- Capacity: 21,500
- Type: Stadium
- Field size: 100 x 65 m
- Current use: Football; Concerts

Construction
- Opened: September 28, 1963; 62 years ago

Website
- caallboys.com.ar/estadio

Estadio Islas Malvinas is a football stadium located in the Monte Castro neighborhood of Buenos Aires, Argentina. It is owned and operated by Club Atlético All Boys. The stadium holds 21,500 spectators and opened in 1963.

The stadium's name reflects Argentina's claims of sovereignty over the Falkland Islands (Islas Malvinas in Spanish). Since 1984, it has also hosted several concerts, with local and foreign artists performing at the stadium.

== History ==
All Boys had rented a land on Segurola 1700 where the club played their home games. As land's proprietor, Santiago Rosa, decided to sell it, the club had to search for another place where to establish their stadium. Roca guaranteed they would not be evicted until they found a new land.

Therefore the last match at Segurola was in 1960 and the stadium started to be dismantled one year later. The old grandstands and other structures were moved to the new location, a block bounded by Mercedes, Miranda, Chivilcoy, and Álvarez Jonte streets. The move was costed by confectionery manufacturer "Georgalos" (which had acquired the land on Segurola street to build a factory).

Due to financial problems, the construction of the stadium was delayed until 28 September 1963, when the club officially inaugurated the new stadium in a ceremony before their match vs Deportivo Riestra in the Primera C championship. The new stadium had only two grandstands, one made of wood (that had belonged to their former venue on Segurola street), and a concrete stand on Mercedes street.

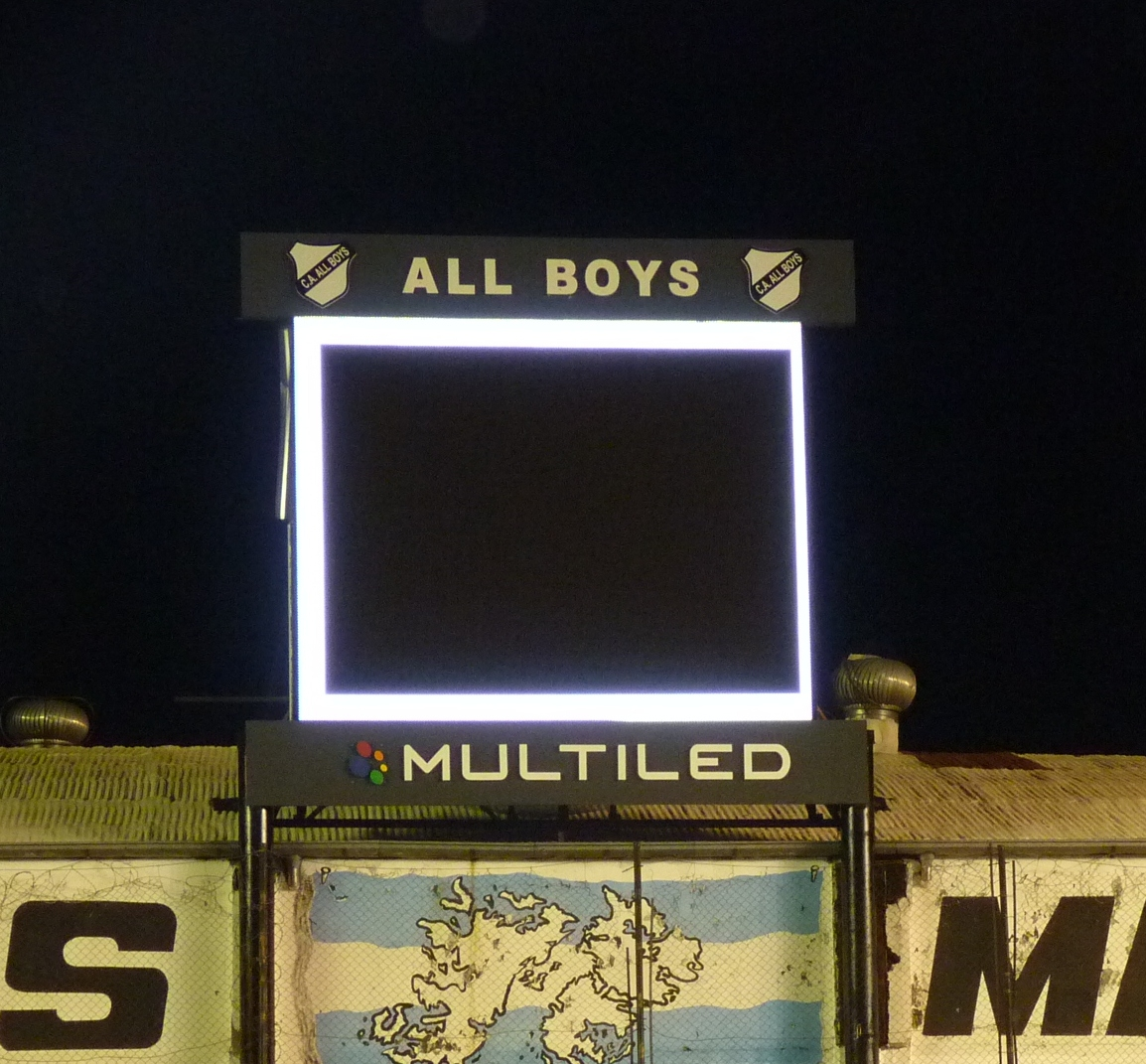
LED screen at the stadium, with its name and the Malvinas Islands silhouette

In 1982, the stadium was named "Islas Malvinas" after the armed conflict between Argentina and the United Kingdom. On 24 April, a plaque with the new name was unveiled before a match vs Defensores de Belgrano. The stadium would not be refurbished until 1998, when a lighting system was installed on August 8.

The stadium has been refurbished several times. The most important work was the construction of a second tier on the Mercedes street side. In August 2001, a new stand was opened with an Argentina national U-20 team match. The new stand was built behind the goal on the Miranda street side. In 2006 the stand made of wooden planks by Chivilcoy street was dismantled, and in September of that year they began construction of the new cement stand. The new stand, along with a new lighting system, were both inaugurated in February 2007.

In 2008, the stadium had a major renovation that included the renovation of the press box, new luxury suites, and the restructuring of the entire second tier, which had been closed to the public for many years due to safety issues.

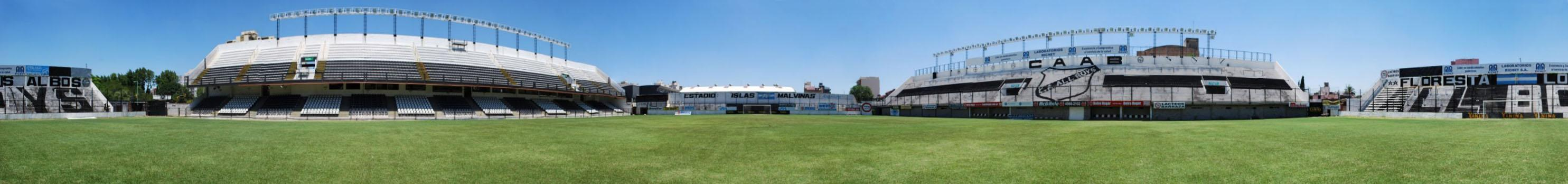
Panoramic view of the stadium taken in 2013

== Other events ==
President of Venezuela Nicolás Maduro gave a speech in the stadium on 8 May 2013, as part of a political event organised by several Kirchnerist groups.

=== Concerts ===
Since 1984, the stadium has hosted a variety of concerts. Some of the musicians that have performed at Islas Malvinas Stadium include:

Artist	Date/Year
V8	1984
Los Violadores	1984
La Ley	1984
Rata Blanca	1988, 1991
Bersuit Vergarabat	1998
Los Piojos	1998, 1999
No Te Va Gustar	2000
Manu Chao	2005, 2009
Los Ratones Paranoicos	2006
Almafuerte	2013

== See also ==
- List of football stadiums in Argentina
- Lists of stadiums
