= Comuna 10 =

- Commune

- Location within Buenos Aires
- Coordinates: 34°37′55″S 58°29′01″W
- Country: Argentina
- Province: Buenos Aires

Area
  - Total: 12.7 km^{2} (4.9 sq mi)

Population (2010)
  - Total: 166,022
- Time zone: UTC-3 (ART)
  - Summer (DST): UTC-2
- Climate: BSh

Comuna 10 is one of the 15 communes in which the Autonomous City of Buenos Aires is divided. It is made up of the neighborhoods of Villa Luro, Vélez Sársfield, Floresta, Monte Castro, Villa Real and Versalles. It is located in the west of the city, has an area of 12.7 km² and a total population of 166,022 according to the 2010 census of which 76,972 are men and 89,050 are women, which represent 46.4% and 53.6% of the commune respectively. The 2001 census registered 163,209 inhabitants, which represents an increase of 1.7%.
