= 2011 Flores rail crash =

Railway accident in Buenos Aires, Argentina

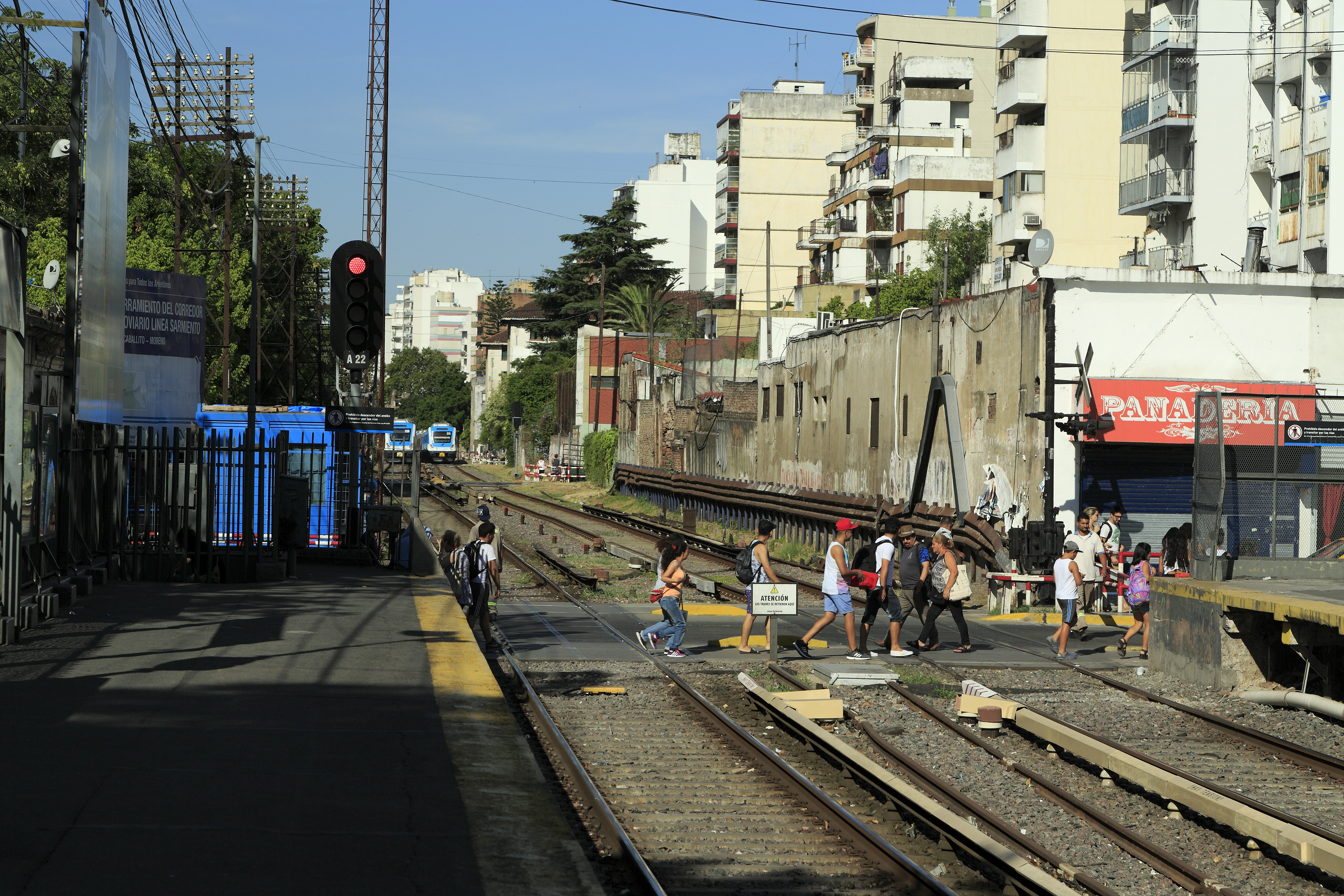
- The level crossing on Artigas street, where the accident happened

Details
- Date: 13 September 2011
- Location: Flores, Buenos Aires
- Coordinates: 34°37′39″S 58°27′54″W
- Country: Argentina
- Line: Sarmiento Line
- Operator: Trenes de Buenos Aires
- Incident type: (Part 1) grade crossing accident (Part 2) Head-on collision
- Cause: Bus driver ignored level crossing warning signals

Statistics
- Trains: 2 (and 1 bus)
- Deaths: 11
- Injured: 228

The 2011 Flores rail crash occurred at 06.23 ART on 13 September 2011 when a bus on a level crossing at Flores railway station, in the Flores barrio of Buenos Aires, Argentina, was hit by a train on the Sarmiento Line, heading for Moreno. The accident caused the derailing train to slam into a stationary train at the station.

It is regarded as the worst train accident in Buenos Aires within 50 years, though its death toll would be surpassed six months later by another crash in the city center.

== The train ==
The train, operated by Trenes de Buenos Aires, derailed and crashed into a second train, Once-bound in the Balvanera barrio, which was standing at the station. The accident, which occurred during the morning rush hour, resulted in 11 deaths and 228 injuries. The bus, owned by the company "Microomnibus Saenz Peña", was working a scheduled service on route 92, heading for Retiro.

Video evidence revealed that the bus driver, who was killed in the accident, ignored warning flash lights and bells on José Artigas street and drove around a partly lowered crossing barrier (partially due to the fact that these had been in a state of constant activation for some time).

== Impact ==
The impact carried the bus into the station, where it was crushed against a platform, the majority of deaths were from people seated in the front of the bus, as this is where it was crushed against the platform. The front carriages of the train derailed, and hit the Once bound train, which was arriving at the opposite platform. It took firefighters two hours to release one of the train drivers from the wreckage. A total of 100 ambulances and 10 fire engines attended the incident, and some of the injured were ferried to hospital by helicopter. At the time, it was the deadliest rail crash within the city since the Villa Soldati level crossing tragedy in 1962.
