= Liniers railway station =

Railway station in Buenos Aires, Argentina

Coordinates: 34°38′20″S 58°31′32″W

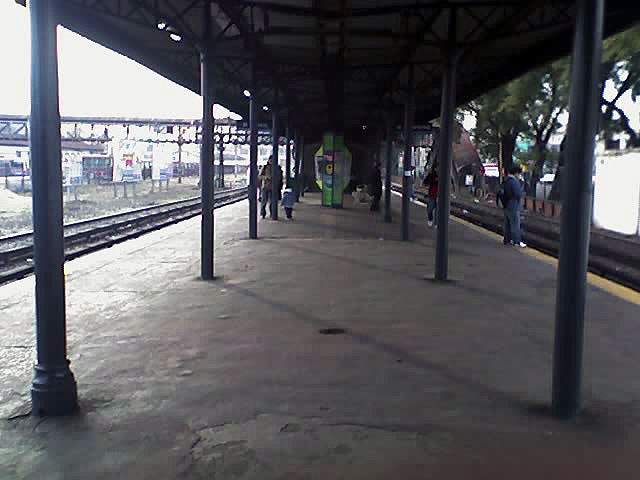
Liniers railway station

Estación Liniers is a railway station located in the Liniers barrio of Buenos Aires, Argentina.

It is on the FFCC Sarmiento line, between the stations of Ciudadela and Villa Luro.

It was first authorised and named in 1872, taking its name in honour of Santiago Liniers. However, services did not commence until 1887.
