= Monte Castro =

Coordinates: 34°37′S 58°30′W

- Neighborhood of Buenos Aires
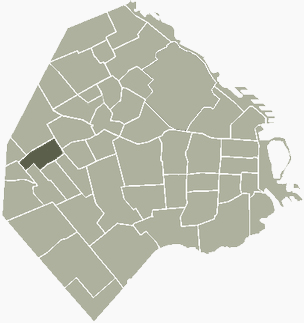
- Location of Monte Castro within Buenos Aires
- Country: Argentina
- Autonomous City: Buenos Aires
- Comuna: C10
- Important sites: Islas Malvinas Stadium, Manuel Rocca Rehabilitation Hospital, Velez Sarsfield Hospital

Area
  - Total: 2.9 km^{2} (1.1 sq mi)

Population
  - Total: 34,584
  - Density: 12,000/km^{2} (31,000/sq mi)
- Time zone: UTC-3 (ART)

Monte Castro is a western barrio (neighborhood) in Buenos Aires, Argentina, belonging to the 10th comuna (district). Its borders are: Alvarez Jonte Ave., Lope de Vega Ave., Juan Agustín García St., Joaquín V. González St., Baigorria St., and Irigoyen St.

It is located in one of the highest zones in the city and is currently a middle-income neighborhood. However, at the end of 1930, many low-rent houses were built by the Compañía General de Construcciones, which have been rebuilt since. It is mainly a single-family neighborhood.

Its name comes from an old owner of these lands, Pedro Fernández de Castro, who bought these in 1703. He died few days later, and his daughter Ana inherited these fields. Presently, the area is now referred to as Chacra de Castro (Castro's farm) or Montes de Castro (Castro's hills).

The barrio's most important sports club is All Boys which was founded in 1913 in the nearby neighborhood of Floresta, later moving to Monte Castro in 1924.

Festivity Day of the neighborhood is on May 14, commemorating the original land deed in 1703.
