= Floresta, Buenos Aires =

Coordinates: 34°38′00″S 58°29′00″W

Floresta
- Neighborhood of Buenos Aires
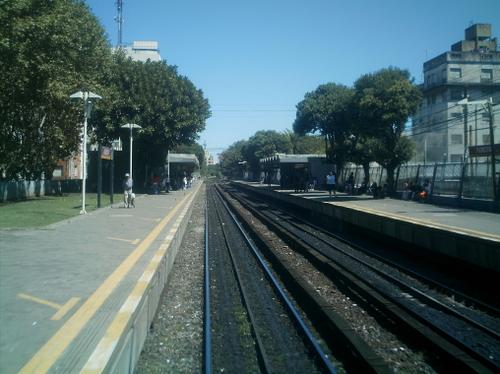
- Railway station at Floresta

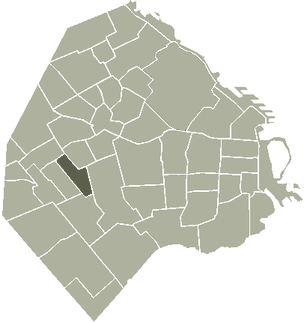
- Location of Floresta within Buenos Aires
- Country: Argentina
- Autonomous City: Buenos Aires
- Comuna: C10
- Important sites: Estadio Islas Malvinas

Area
  - Total: 2.4 km^{2} (0.93 sq mi)

Population
  - Total: 39,437
  - Density: 16,000/km^{2} (43,000/sq mi)
- Time zone: UTC-3 (ART)

Floresta is a neighbourhood located to the west of Buenos Aires. The district developed and was named after Buenos Aires Western Railway's first terminal station's area called La Floresta, in 1857.

Avellaneda Park, the neighborhood's most important, was built in 1914 on grounds that once belonged to a monastery. An early Italian immigrant to Argentina, Felix Barabino, built his home in Floresta and boasted the neighborhood's most imposing residence at the time. Today, it is home to the Floresta Cultural and Historical Society, which maintains a valuable library there.

== Sports ==
The district is home to All Boys football club who play at Estadio Islas Malvinas. It was also the original home of Club Atlético Vélez Sársfield, which is now based in the Liniers district of Buenos Aires.

== Notable residents ==
- Roberto Arlt
- Gabino Ezeiza
- Eduardo Gudiño Kieffer
