= Villa Real, Buenos Aires =

Coordinates: 34.6191°S 58.5266°W

Villa Real
- Neighborhood of Buenos Aires
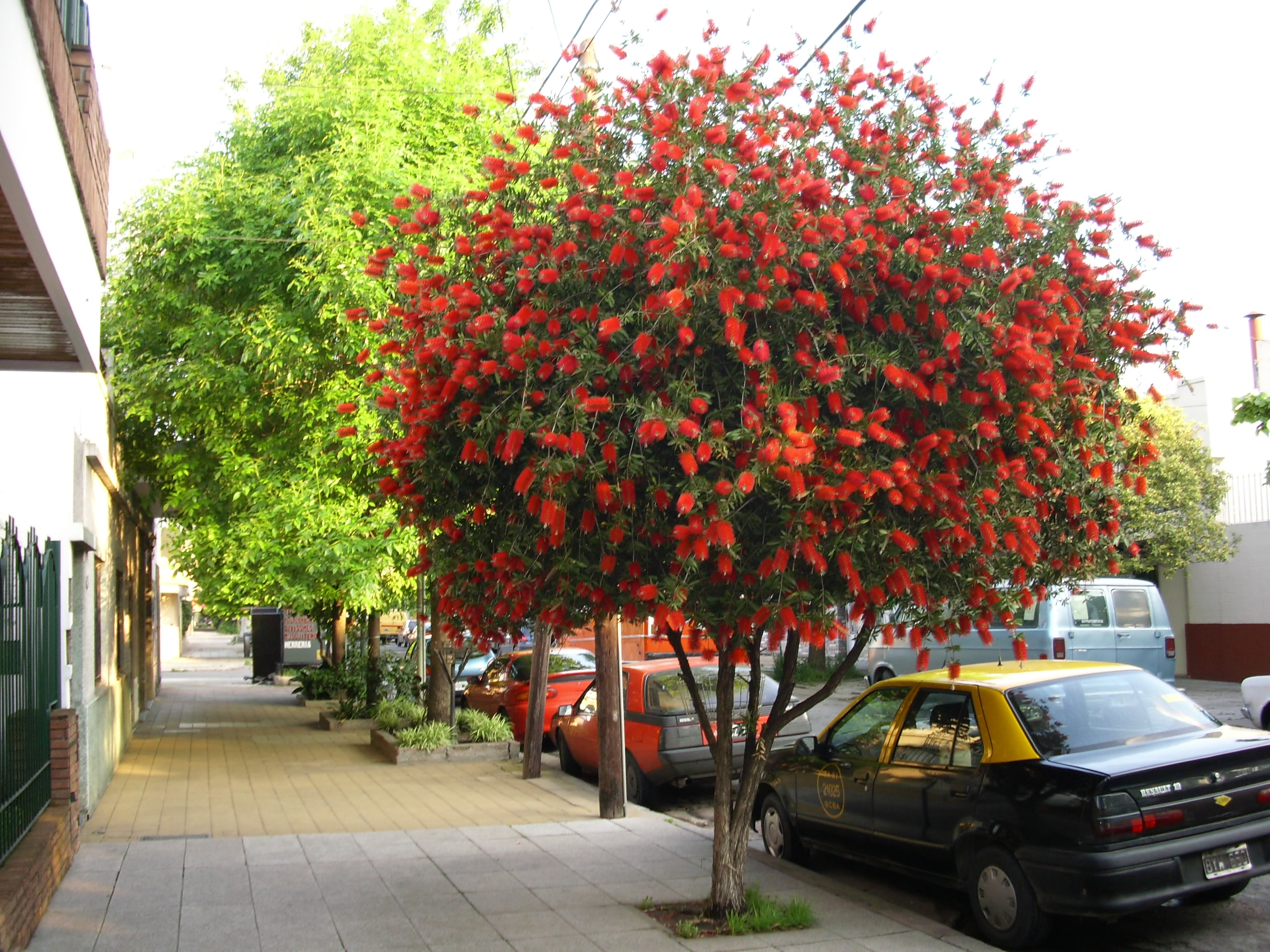
- View of Calle Cortina in Villa Real

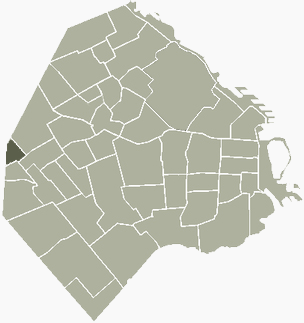
- Location of Villa Real within Buenos Aires
- Country: Argentina
- Autonomous City: Buenos Aires
- Comuna: C10

Area
  - Total: 1.5 km^{2} (0.58 sq mi)

Population
  - Total: 14,278
  - Density: 9,500/km^{2} (25,000/sq mi)
- Time zone: UTC-3 (ART)

Villa Real is a barrio (district) of Buenos Aires, Argentina. It is located in the western part of the City of Buenos Aires.
