= Pedro Luro =

Argentine colonist (1820–1890)

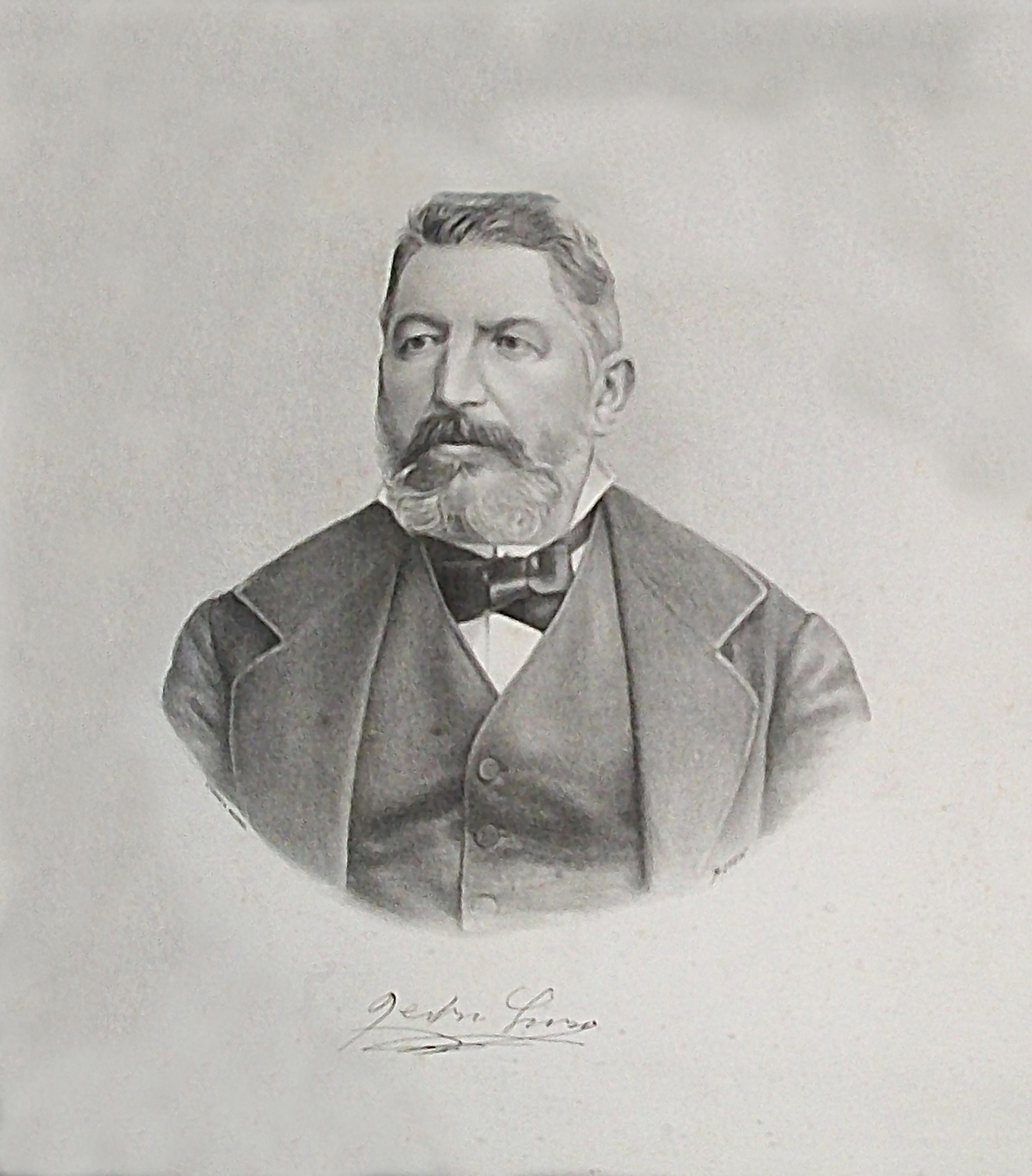

Pedro Luro (March 10, 1820, in Gamarthe, France – February 28, 1890, in Cannes, France), immigrated to Argentina in 1837 and worked in a 'saladero,' a manufacturing facility designed to produce salted and dried meat, as a rural peasant and passenger. He was a proponent of Mar del Plata and of transitioning the territory of La Pampa into a province. Furthermore, he colonized lands in the middle and south of the Buenos Aires province until the Río Negro.

His family composed of his wife and ten children. Two of his children died at a young age.

He migrated to Argentina at the age of 17, not having a penny to his name. He began working in the rural parts of Argentina planting trees, where he was paid in land. The current land owner at the time went away for a few years and when he had returned, he found that Pedro had planted many trees on the land. The only way the man could pay Pedro was to give him all the land, which resulted in them going to court, in which Pedro won and became a very wealthy man.
