= Flores, Buenos Aires =

Coordinates: 34°38′S 58°28′W

Flores
- Neighborhood of Buenos Aires
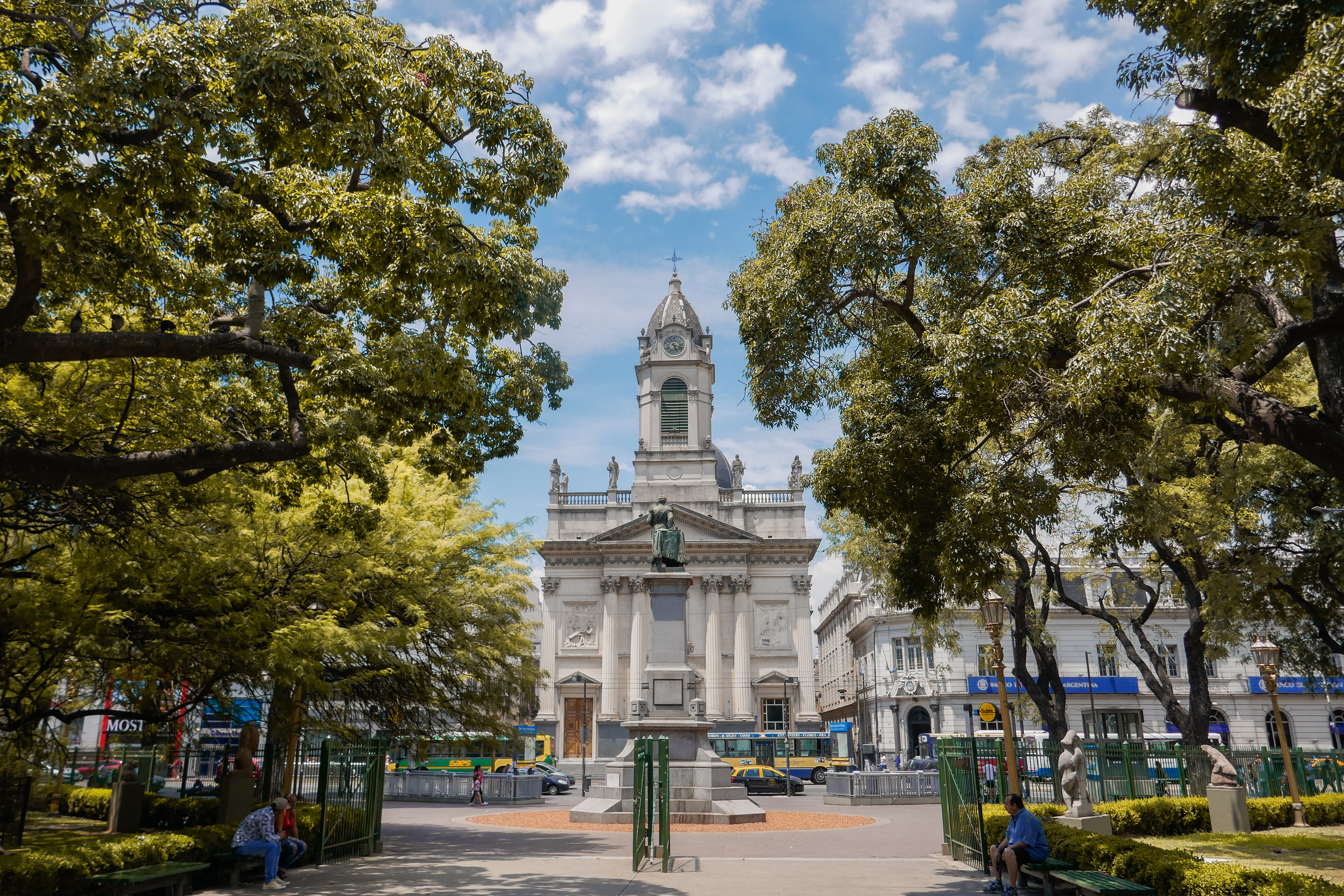
- The Basilica of San José de Flores

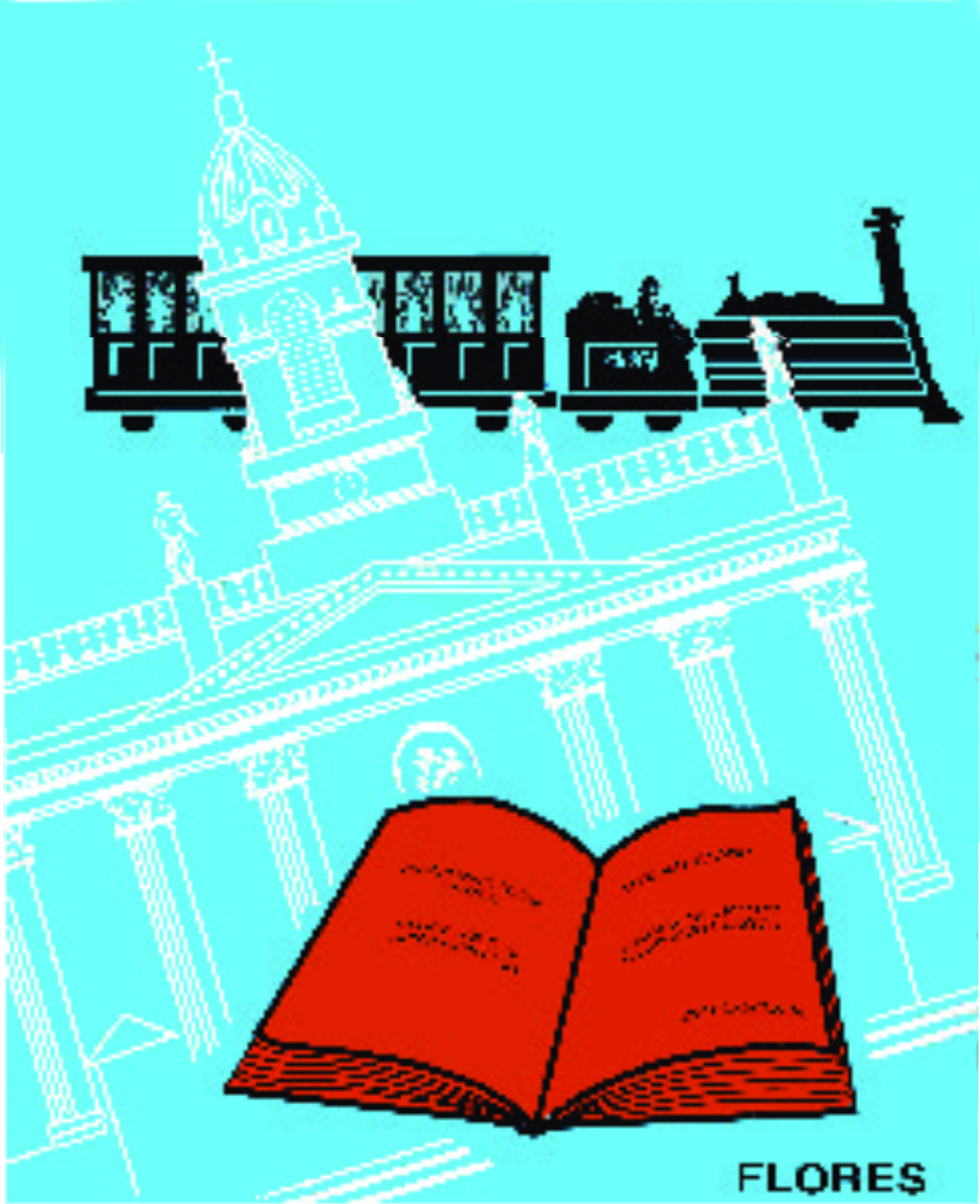
- Emblem
- Interactive map of Flores
- Country: Argentina
- Autonomous City: Buenos Aires
- Comuna: C7
- Important sites: Plaza Flores; Basílica de San José de Flores

Area
  - Total: 8.1 km^{2} (3.1 sq mi)

Population (2001)
  - Total: 150,484
  - Density: 19,000/km^{2} (48,000/sq mi)
- Time zone: UTC-3 (ART)

Flores (Spanish for "Flowers") is a middle-class barrio or district in the center part of Buenos Aires city, Argentina. Flores was considered a rural area of the Province of Buenos Aires until 1888 when it was integrated into the city. Flores is the birthplace of Pope Francis.

== Limits ==
The limits of the neighborhood are marked by several streets and avenues: Portela, Cuenca, Av. Gaona, Av. Donato Álvarez, Curapaligüe, Av. Directorio, Av. Carabobo, Av. Castañares, Torres y Tenorio, Av. Riestra, Av. Perito Moreno, Av. Castañares, Lacarra, and Av. Luis J. Dellepiane.

== History ==
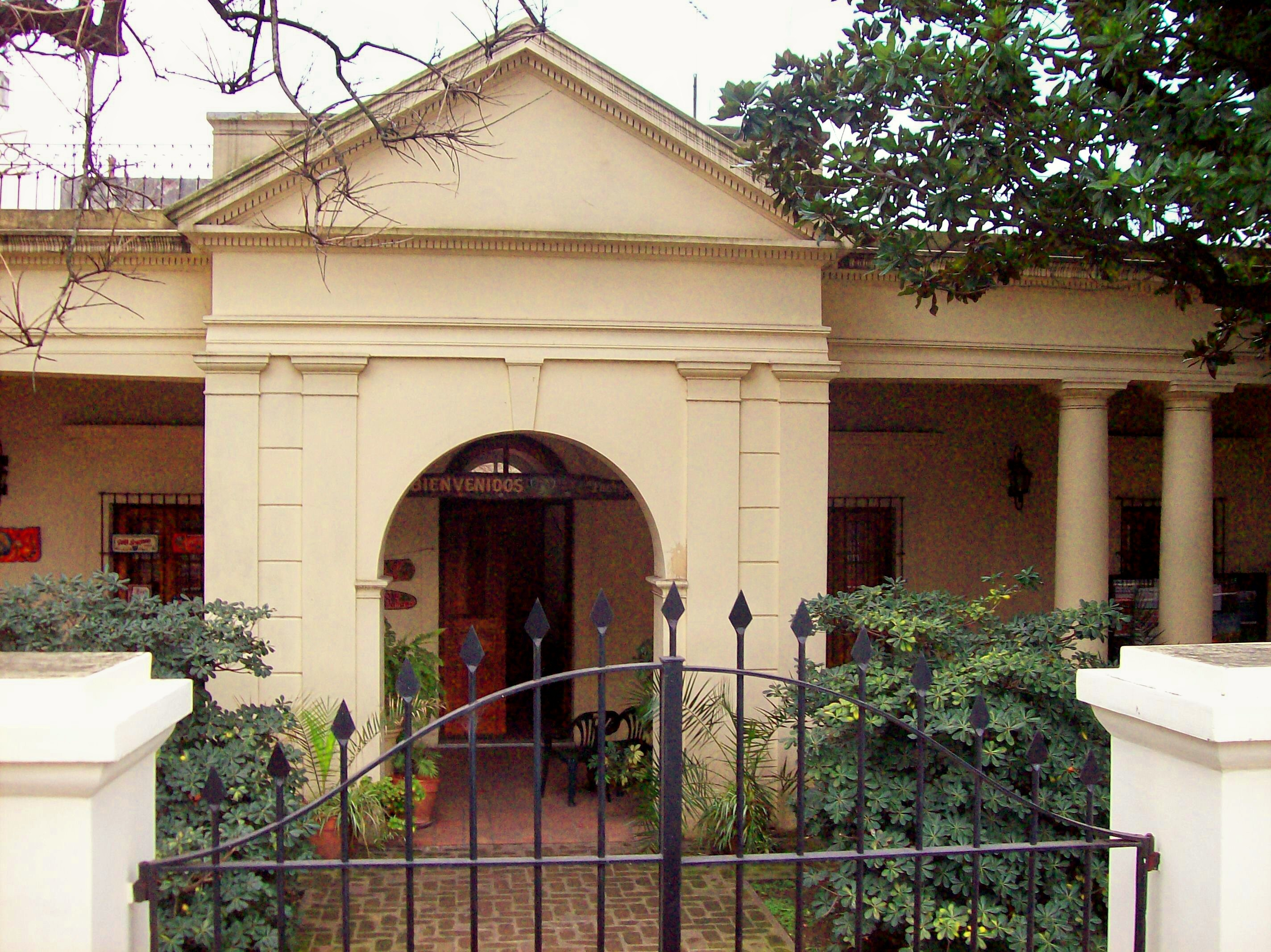
Marcó del Pont Cultural Center

Flores was mainly composed of country houses from the wealthy people of the City of Buenos Aires. Today, remains of those houses can still be found, including the house owned by Juan Manuel de Rosas, the Governor of the Province around the 19th century.

One of the most prominent of these early homeowners in Flores was the Marcó del Pont family, descendants of a former Spanish governor of Chile. Purchasing property facing the new railway station (one of Argentina's first), they had a comfortable yet understated italianate property built in 1860. Relocating in 1929, the family sold the property and the estate fell into disrepair. Slated at one time for demolition, it eventually caught the attention of the San José de Flores Historical Society, who prevailed on the city to declare it a National Historic Monument, in 1976. Its fate is now secure, as the home became the Marcó del Pont Cultural Center.

The neighbourhood's commercial areas are centered on the train station, Rivadavia Avenue, and the nearby parish church, Basílica de San José de Flores, dating from 1831 which has a romanticist architectural style.

A fictitious mythology of the neighborhood was created by author Alejandro Dolina, centered on the grey angel of Flores. A famous tango song, San José de Flores, centers on the sorrow of a man returning to the barrio after a long and tumultuous absence.

The Pueyrredón theatre was a famous ballroom, where tango vocalist Edmundo Rivero gained fame in the 1930s and was also an oft-used venue by early Argentine rock bands such as Almendra.

On 13 September 2011, a bus on a level crossing at Flores rail station was hit by a train traveling on the Sarmiento Line, operated by Trenes de Buenos Aires, heading for Moreno. The train derailed and crashed into a second train, standing at the station, bound for Once. The accident, which occurred during the morning rush hour, resulted in 11 deaths and 228 injuries. The bus, operated by Empresa de Transportes Microómnibus Sáenz Peña, was working a scheduled service on route 92, heading for Retiro. Video evidence revealed that the bus driver, who was killed in the accident, ignored warning lights and a partly lowered barrier at the crossing.

== Notable locals ==
Jorge Mario Bergoglio, later known as Pope Francis, was born and grew up in Flores, as did Roberto Arlt. Author Cesar Aira resides in Flores.

== Images ==
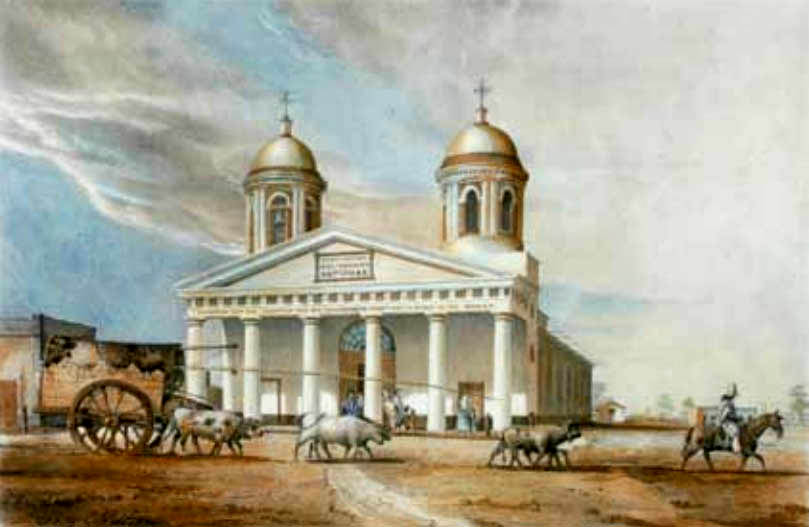
Original temple, drawing by Carlos Pellegrini in 1840.

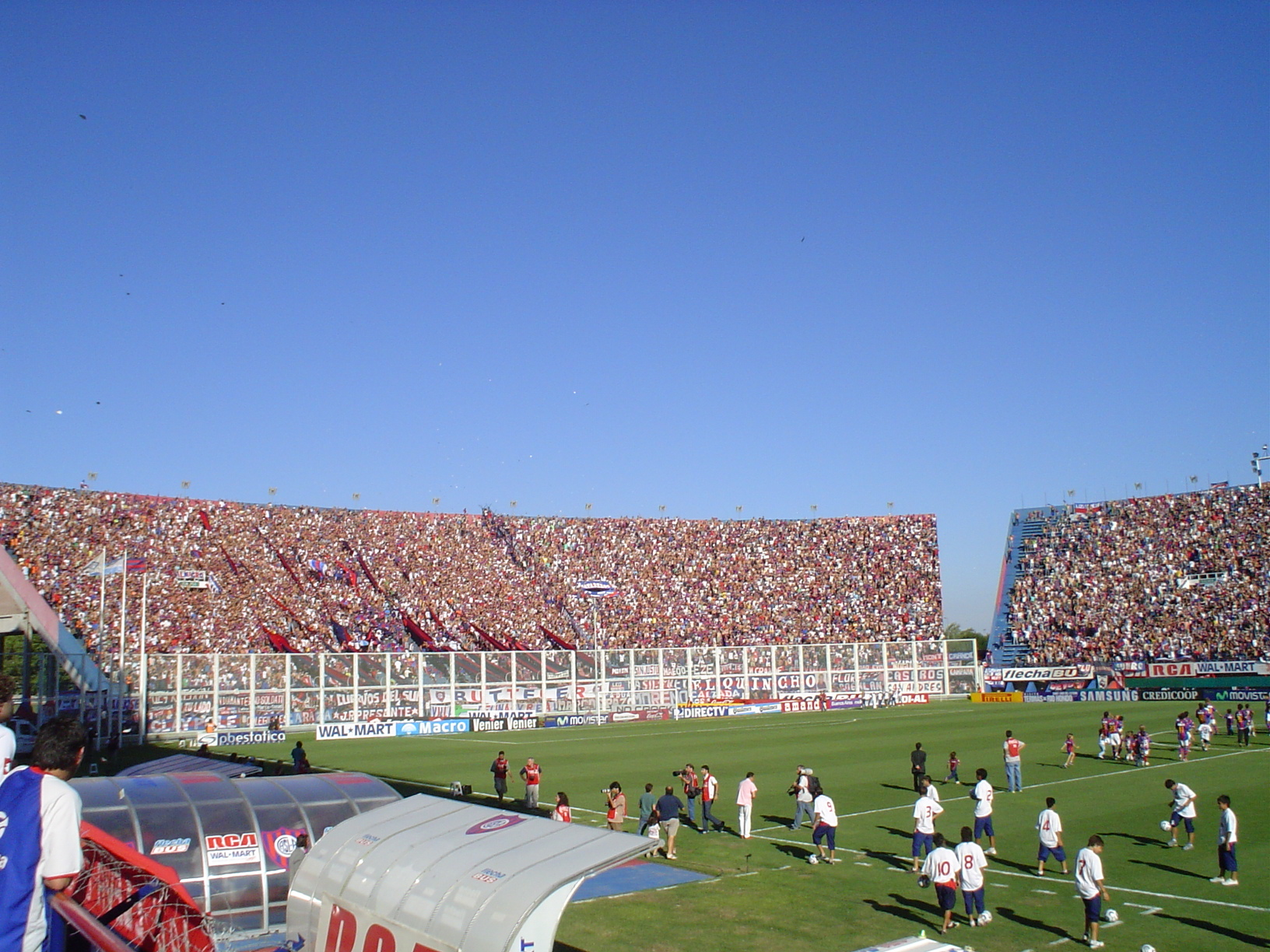
Bidegain Stadium, home of the San Lorenzo de Almagro football team

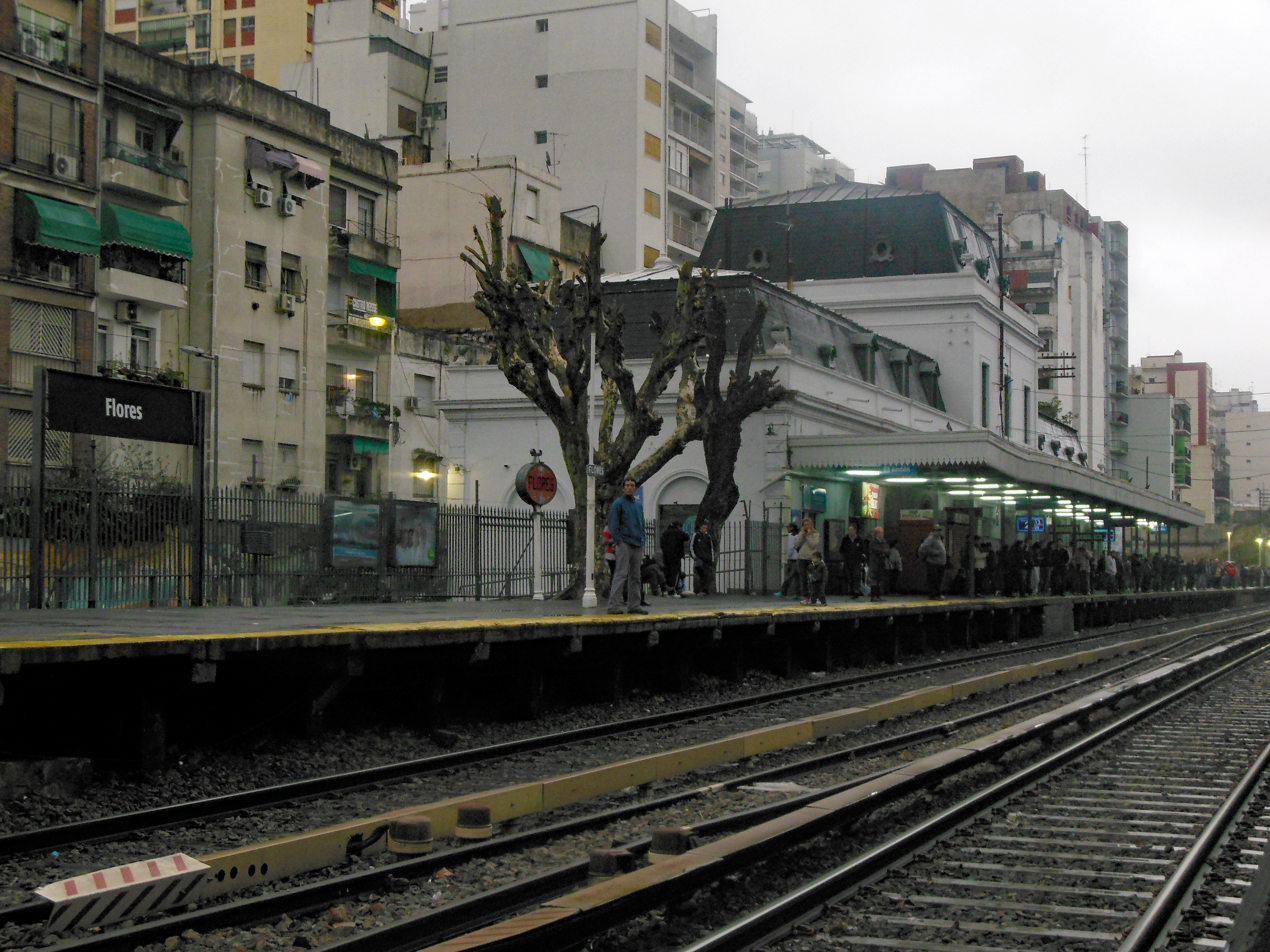
Flores Railway Station, scene of the 2011 Flores rail crash

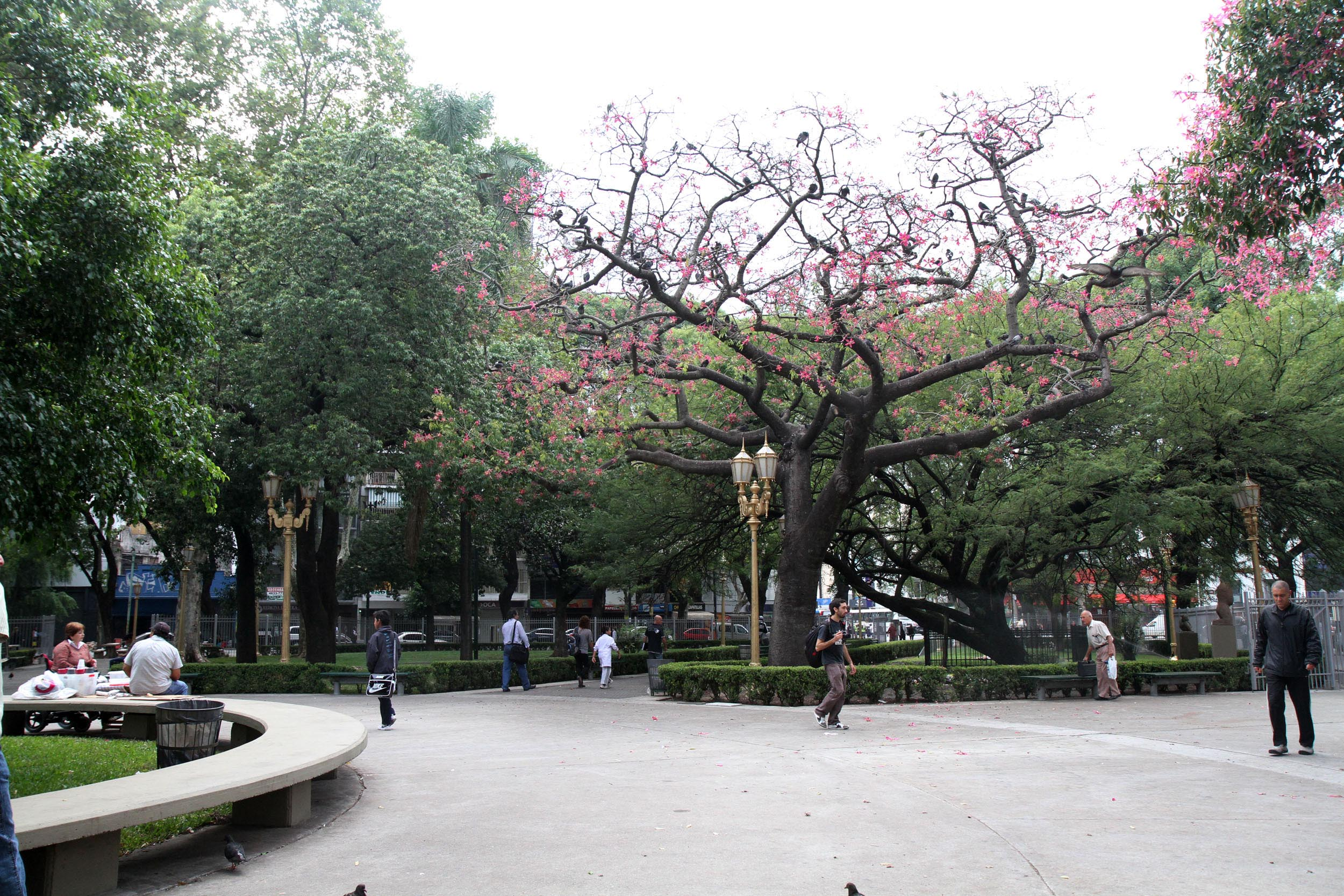
Plaza Pueyrredón
