= Liniers =

Neighborhood of Buenos Aires, Argentina

Coordinates: 34.6436°S 58.5164°W

- Neighborhood of Buenos Aires
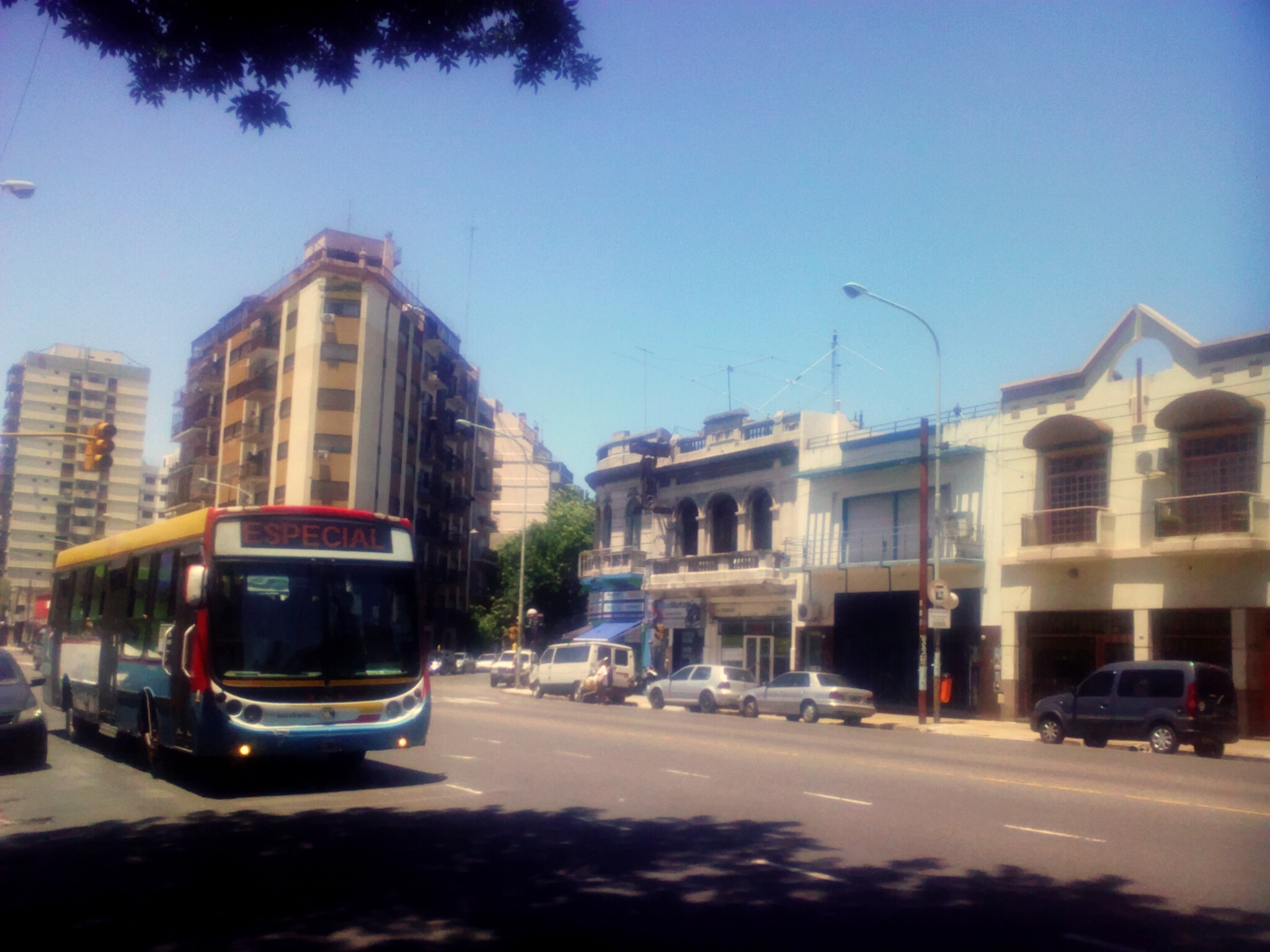
- Rivadavia Avenue

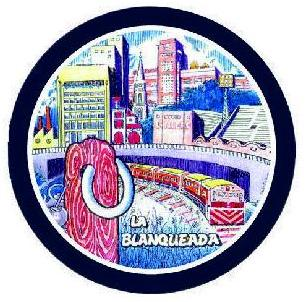
- Seal

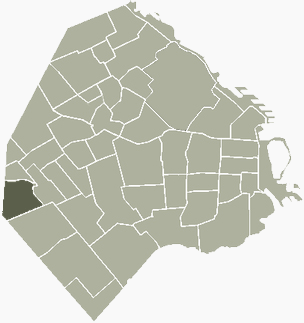
- Location of Liniers within Buenos Aires
- Country: Argentina
- Autonomous City: Buenos Aires
- Comuna: C9
- Important sites: José Amalfitani Stadium, San Cayetano Church

Area
  - Total: 5.4 km^{2} (2.1 sq mi)

Population (2001)
  - Total: 44,234
  - Density: 8,200/km^{2} (21,000/sq mi)
- Time zone: UTC-3 (ART)

Liniers is a barrio (neighborhood) of Buenos Aires on the edge of the city, centered on Rivadavia Avenue. It is also an important train station and bus hub, connecting western Gran Buenos Aires with the Buenos Aires Metro.

The neighborhood developed around the Liniers railway station following its inaugural in 1872.

The neighborhood is home to football club Club Atlético Vélez Sársfield, whose stadium, the José Amalfitani Stadium, has been established there in 1951. Liners is also the site of the Church of San Cayetano, consecrated in 1900 and elevated to a parish in 1913. The Church of San Cayetano hosts thousands of faithful who gather each feast day (August 7) to pray for employment or to give thanks for their livelihood.

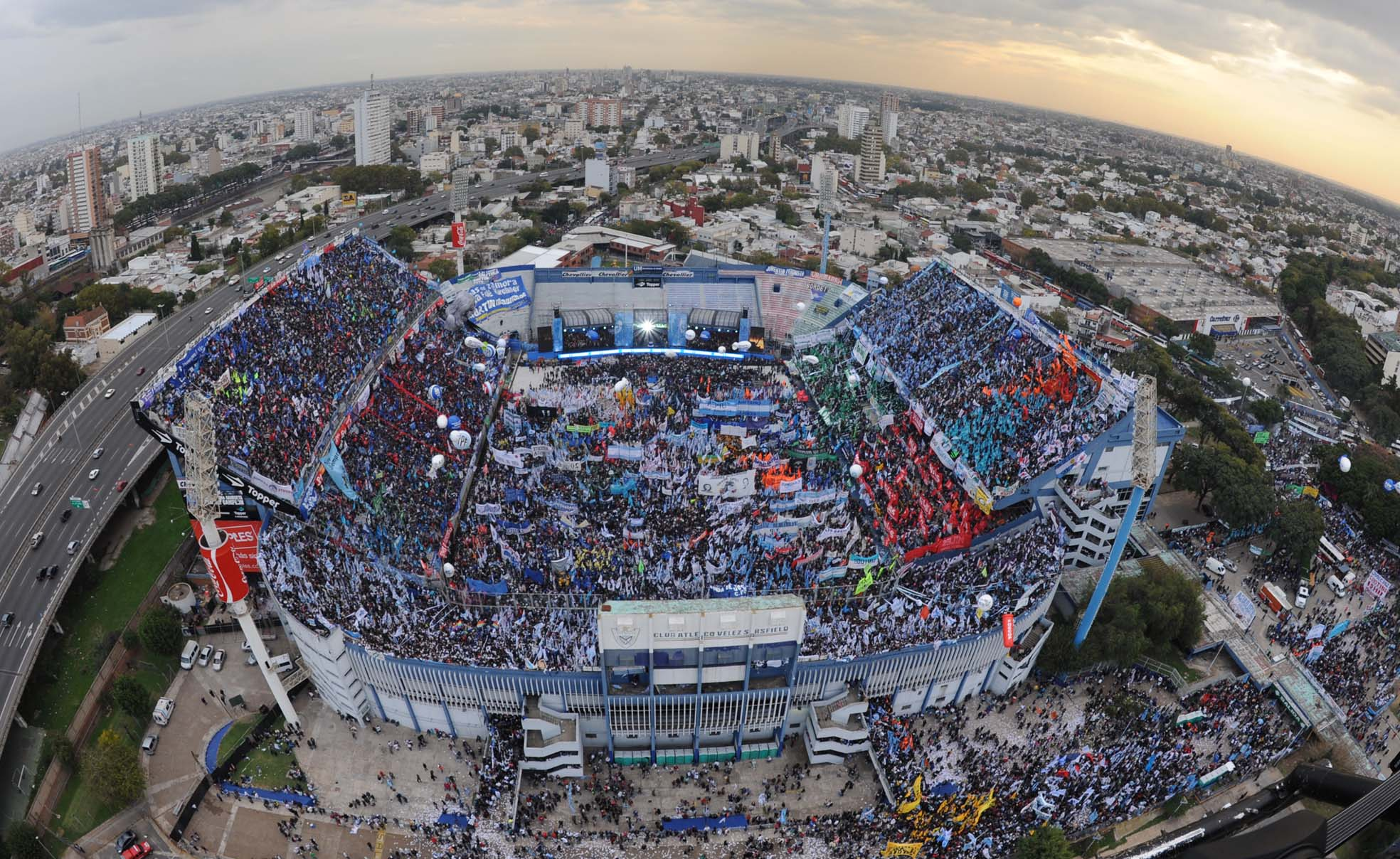
José Amalfitani Stadium

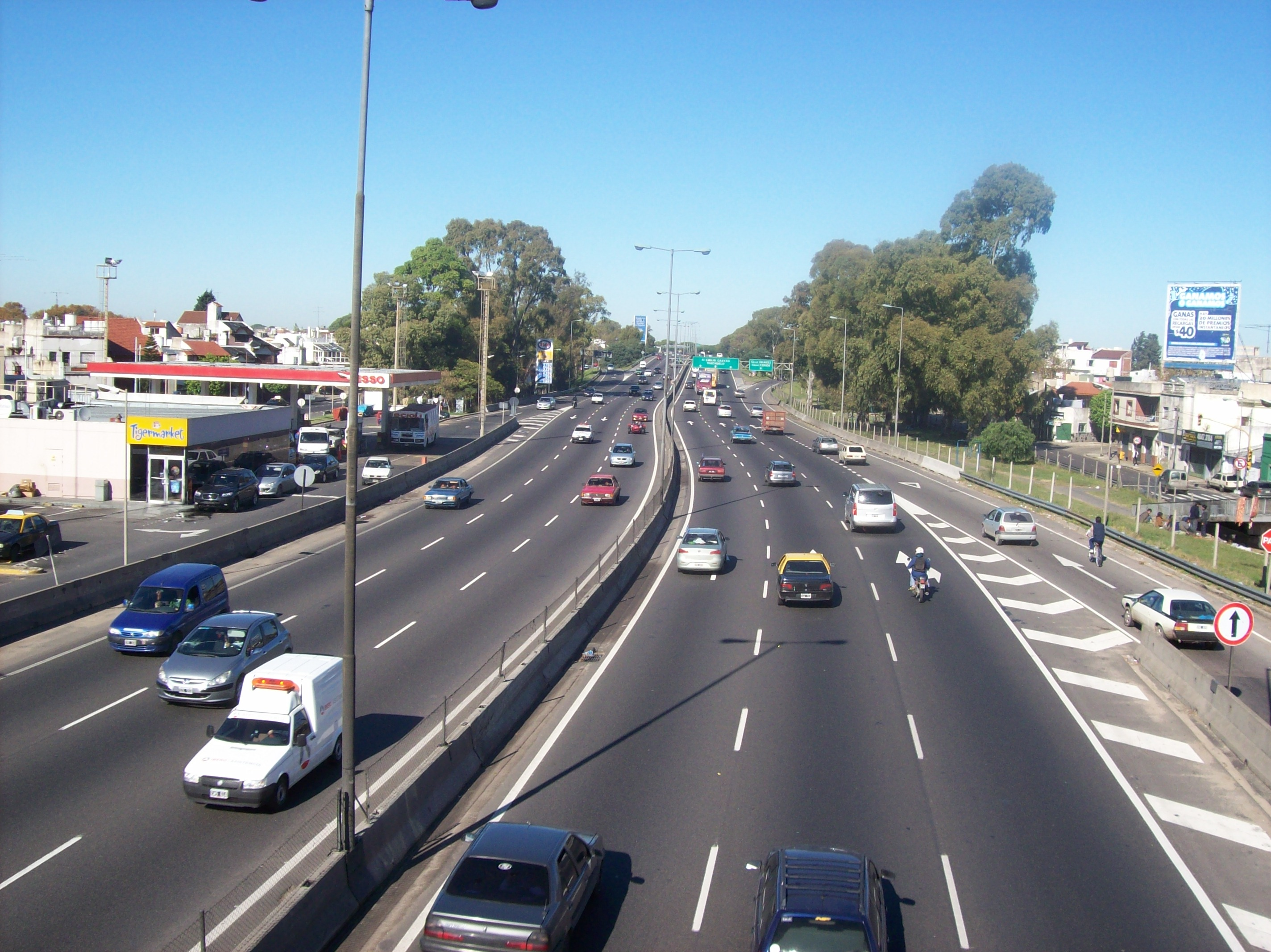
View of General Paz Freeway and Liniers (left).

The ward is named after Santiago de Liniers, a colonial administrator who resisted the British Invasions of the Río de la Plata.
