= Villa Luro =

Coordinates: 34°38′S 58°30′W

- Neighborhood of Buenos Aires
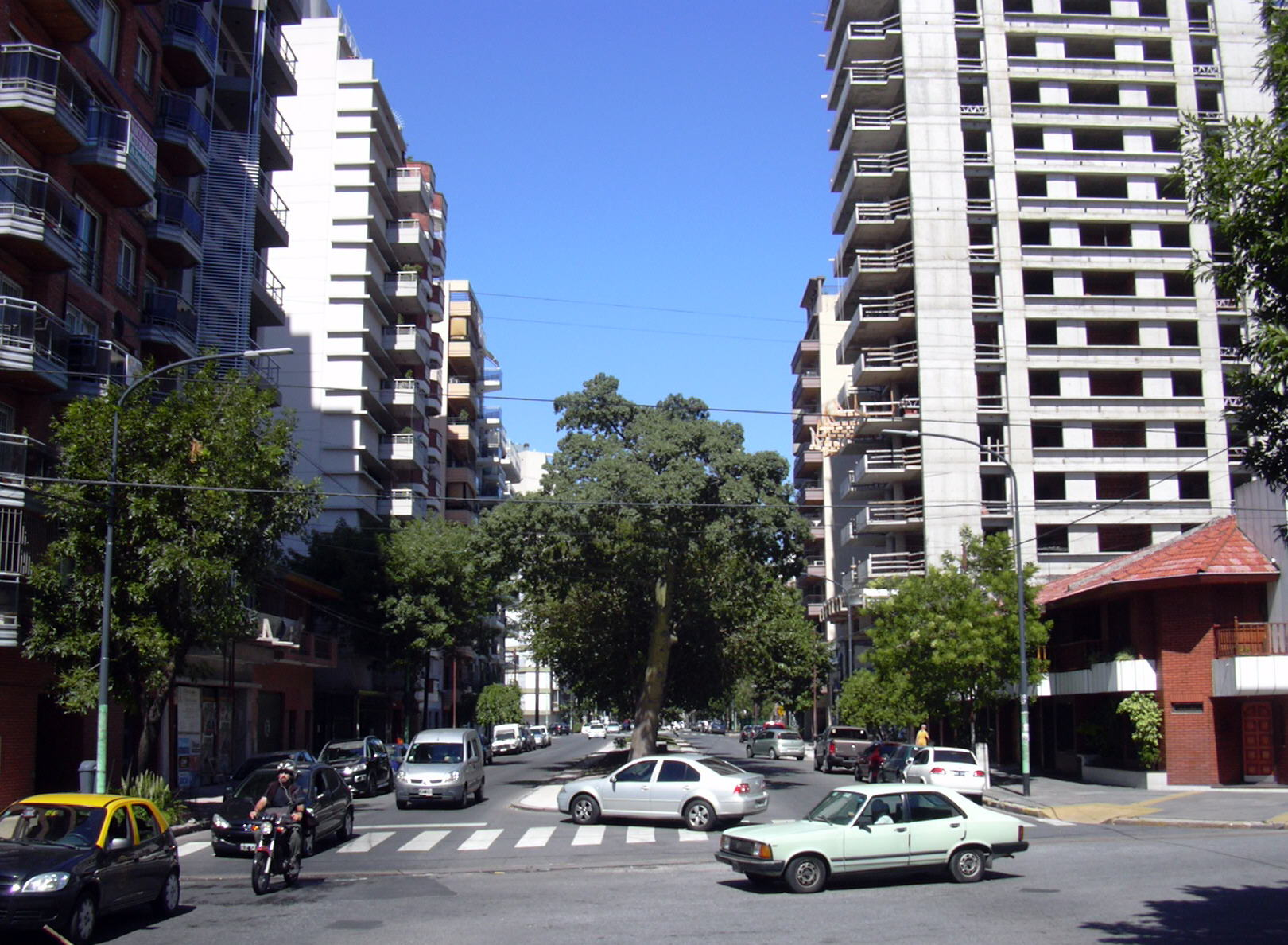
- Ramón Falcón Boulevard

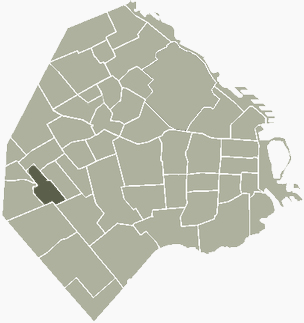
- Location of Villa Luro within Buenos Aires
- Country: Argentina
- Autonomous City: Buenos Aires
- Comuna: C10

Area
  - Total: 2.6 km^{2} (1.0 sq mi)

Population
  - Total: 33,058
  - Density: 13,000/km^{2} (33,000/sq mi)
- Time zone: UTC-3 (ART)

Villa Luro is a barrio (district) of Buenos Aires, Argentina. It is located near the western end of the City of Buenos Aires.

The district owes its name to Dr. Pedro Luro, a prominent local physician and real-estate developer who, during the 1870s, sold most of his property in the area as residential lots. The neighborhood, which at the time was on the outskirts of the city, grew rapidly following the inaugural in 1911 of the Buenos Aires Western Railway's Villa Luro station (today a stop along the Sarmiento Line).

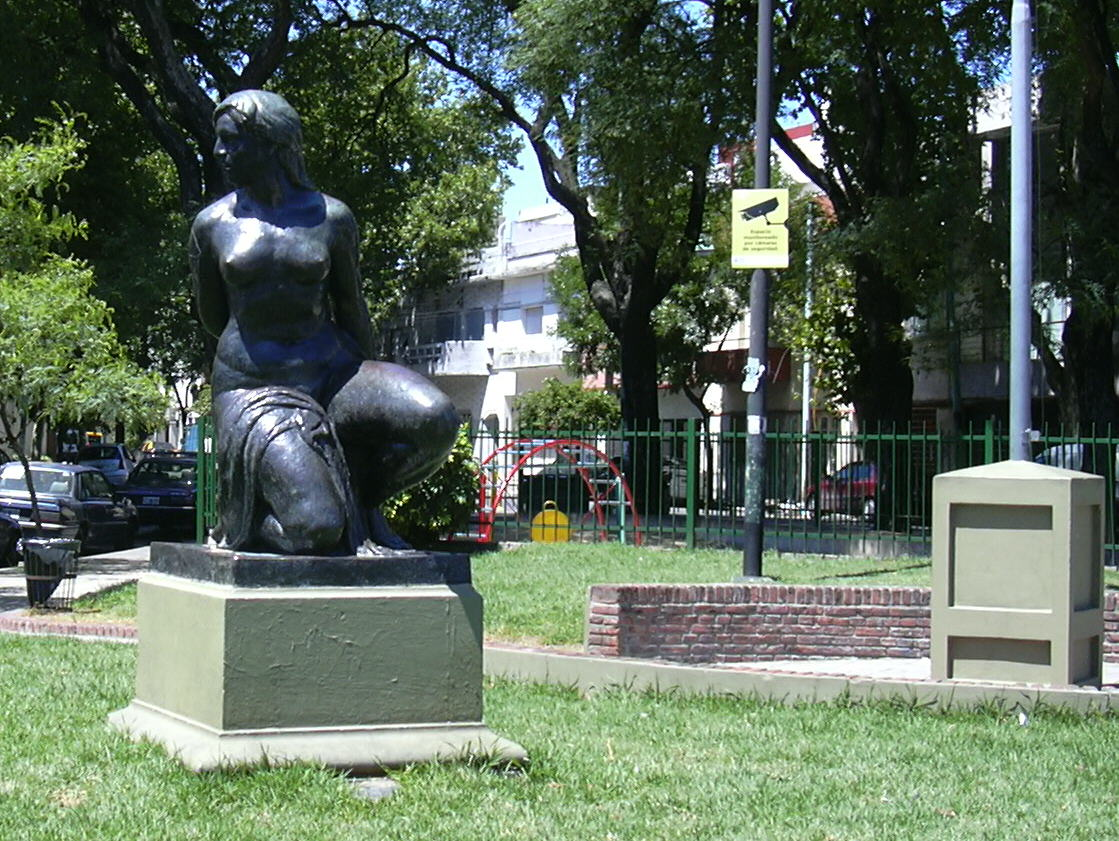
Santiago Chiérico's "La Cautiva", in Vicente Bellini Square.

The district's largest park, Plaza Ejército de los Andes, was opened in 1939. A defunct Western Railway line that divided the neighbourhood diagonally was converted into the Avenida del Justicialismo in 1951, and this avenue was in turn replaced by the Perito Moreno Expressway in 1980. Villa Luro is also accessible from downtown Buenos Aires (11 kilometres (7 mi) to the east) via Rivadavia Avenue, and most of the high-rises in the largely low-density district were built along it. A more upscale section within the district, Villa Luro Hollywood, was later developed along Ramón Falcón Avenue one block south of Rivadavia Avenue.

Notable neighbourhood institutions include the Church and Institute of Our Lady of Perpetual Help (1911), the Valle Miñor Social Club (1928), the Villa Luro Association of Plastic Arts (2000), and the Alejandro Olmos Cultural Center (2009).
