= Hospital Naval =

- Argentine Navy
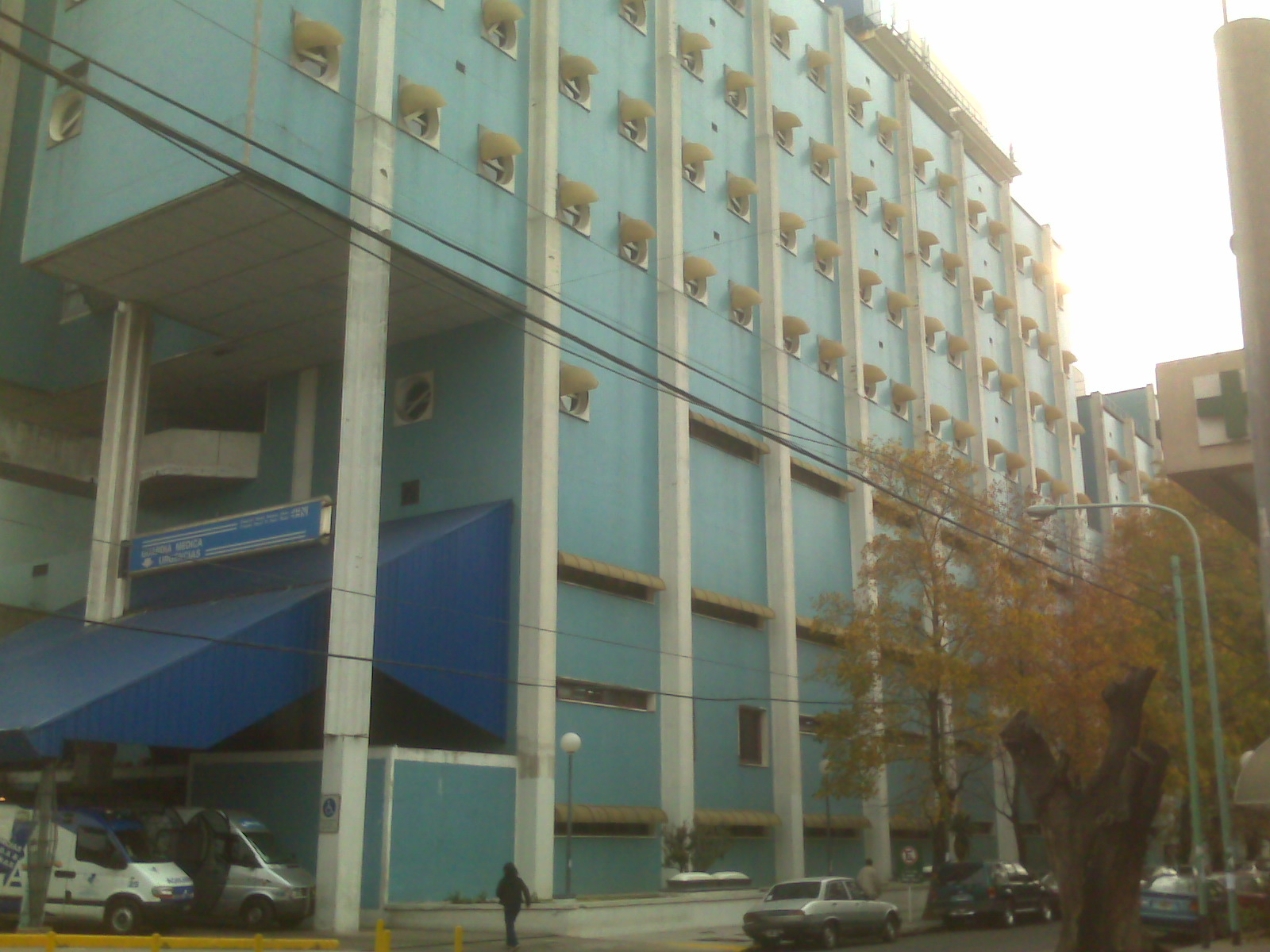
- The Naval Hospital

Geography
- Location: Caballito, Buenos Aires, Argentina
- Coordinates: 34°36′19″S 58°25′59″W

Organisation
- Type: Military hospital

History
- Opened: 1947

Links
- Website: www.hnpm.mil.ar
- Lists: Hospitals in Argentina

Hospital Naval is a building in the Caballito section of Buenos Aires designed by architect Clorindo Testa in 1977. Serving Argentine Navy personnel and facing Parque Centenario, the institution was established in 1947, and its current, modernist building was inaugurated in 1981. The 30,000 m^{2} (320,000 ft^{2}) hospital is one of the best-known examples of brutalist architecture in Argentina.

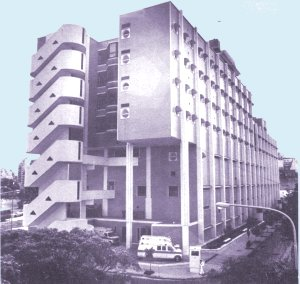
Hospital Naval Central.
