= Hermann Burmeister =

German Argentine zoologist, entomologist, herpetologist, and botanist (1807–1892)

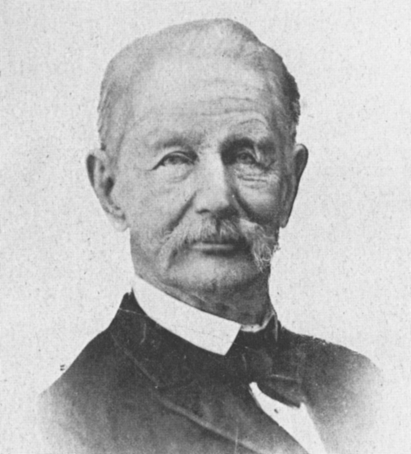
- Born: Karl Hermann Konrad Burmeister; 15 January 1807; Stralsund, Mecklenburg-Vorpommern, Germany
- Died: 2 May 1892 (aged 85); Buenos Aires, Argentina
- Other name: Carlos Germán Conrado Burmeister
- Education: University of Greifswald, University of Halle, Humboldt University of Berlin
- Known for: Handbuch der Entomologie
- Spouse: Marie Elise Sommer
- Scientific career
- Fields: zoology, entomology, herpetology, botany, and coleopterology
- Workplaces: University of Halle, National University of Córdoba, Argentina
- Patrons: Alexander von Humboldt
- Thesis: De insectorum systemate naturali
- Author abbrev. (botany): Burmeist.
- Author abbrev. (zoology): Burmeister

Karl Hermann Konrad Burmeister (also known as Carlos Germán Conrado Burmeister) (15 January 1807 – 2 May 1892) was a German Argentine zoologist, entomologist, herpetologist, botanist, and coleopterologist. He served as a professor at the University of Halle, headed the museum there and published the Handbuch der Entomologie (1832–1855) before moving to Argentina where he worked until his death.

== Career ==
Burmeister was born in Stralsund, where his father was a customs officer. He studied medicine at Greifswald (1825–1827) and Halle (1827–1829), and in 1830 went to Berlin to qualify himself to be a teacher of natural history. His dissertation was titled De insectorum systemate naturali and graduated as a doctor of medicine on November 4, 1829 and then received a doctor of philosophy on December 19 in the same year. He then joined for military service in Berlin and Grünberg (Silesia). He was soon after appointed an instructor in the gymnasium at Cologne. He later became a professor of zoology at the Martin Luther University of Halle-Wittenberg serving there from 1837 to 1861. During this period he published several major works on insects which also involved the examination of insect collections around Europe and those of wealthy collectors. He married Marie Elise, the daughter of shipowner and insect collector M.C. Sommer of Altona, in 1836.

In 1848, during the revolutionary excitement, he was sent by the city of Halle as deputy to the national assembly, and subsequently by the town of Leibnitz to the first Prussian chamber. Around 1848 he became a socialist and still later opposed slavery. He traveled to Brazil from 1850 to 1852 — partly supported through the efforts of Alexander von Humboldt — was cut short by a leg injury. He then visited Argentina from 1857 to 1860, returning to Germany with zoological collections. He was elected to the American Philosophical Society in 1856. In 1861, he divorced his wife and went to live in Argentina, founding the Institute at the Museo Nacional in Buenos Aires. He married an Argentine woman and they had two sons, Carlos and Federico. Carlos also became a scientist. Burmeister headed the Academy of Sciences, formed from the scientific faculty of Argentina's National University of Córdoba. He took an interest in paleontology and was keenly interested in protecting fossils in the pampas region and helped the passage of a law.

In the field of herpetology he described many new species of amphibians and reptiles. He also mistakenly described a bovid atlas as belonging to Macrauchenia patachonica. Burmeister was said to be harsh and did not have any close circle of friends. While working at the Argentine museum, he had a fall from a ladder and landed on a glass case and injured himself seriously on 8 February 1892. He resigned from work on 18 April and died on 2 May. A state funeral was held on the 4 May and the president of Argentina, Carlos Pellegrini was present. A monument was placed on the bank of the Rio de La Plata in the Parque 3 Febrero on October 7, 1900 and later moved to the Parque Centenario.

== Evolution ==
Burmeister was a critic of Darwinism, he rejected common descent. However, he changed his views slightly on common descent in the late 1870s. In 1879 he commented that:

I am wholly convinced that the beings found in the older formations of our globe are the prototypes of contemporary beings, and in this respect, I declare myself a partisan of the hypothesis recently developed in detail, and as a natural law, by Darwin and his followers. But I must confess that their experiments have not provided me with any proof that any fundamental change in type is possible.

Florentino Ameghino described Burmeister as a "Biblical creationist", although this remains unconfirmed.

== Bibliography ==
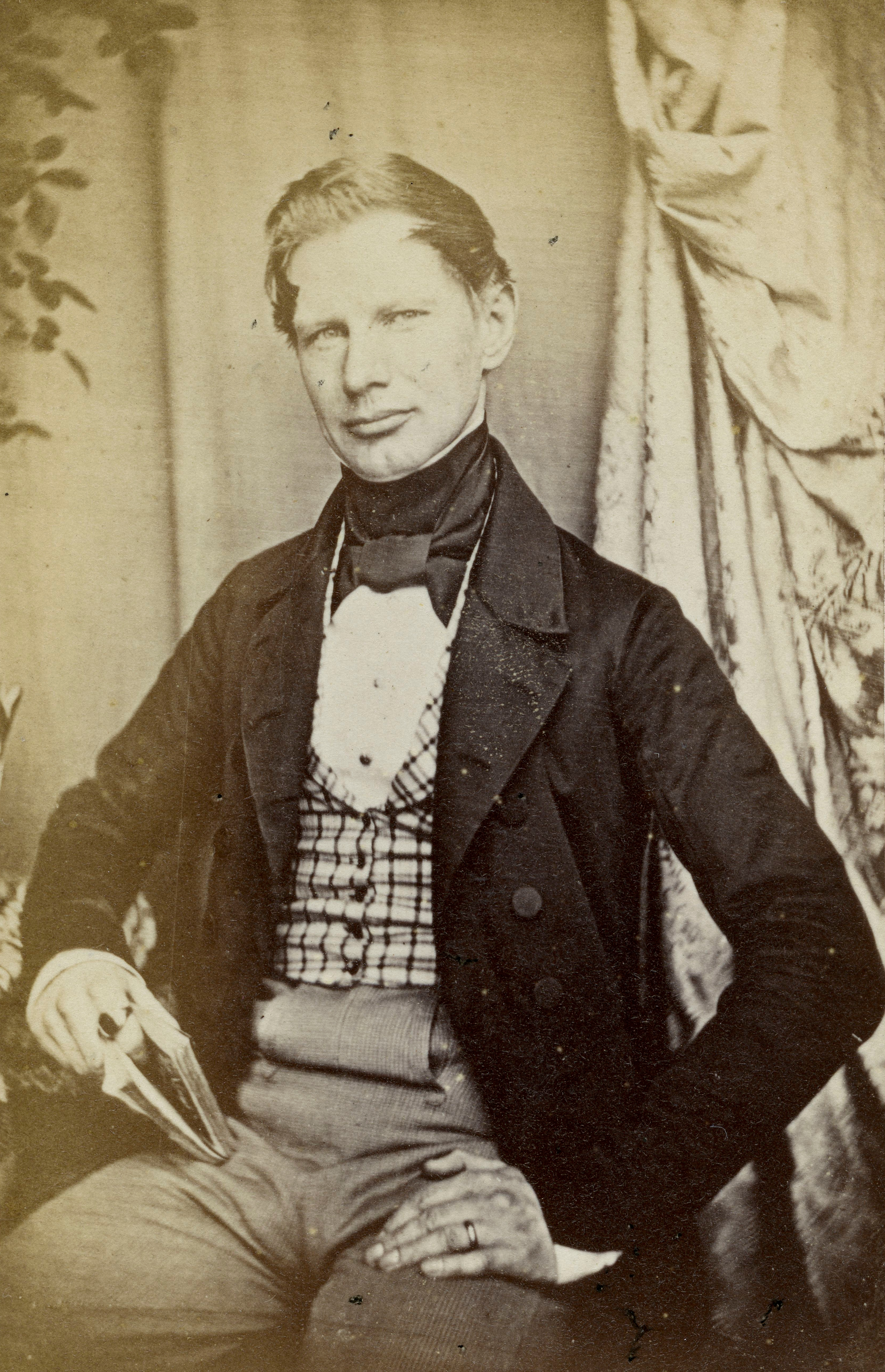
In 1868

- 1829 De insectorum systemate naturali. 40 pp. Grunert, Halle. [1829.??]
- 1832 Handbuch der Entomologie Vol. 1, xvi+ 696 + [2] pp. Reimer, Berlin. [after 1832.10.31]
- [1835] Bericht über die Fortschritte der Entomologie 1834–35. Arch. Naturgesch. 1(2): 7-74.
- 1837 Handbuch der Naturgeschichte. [Part 2] xii + pp. 369–858. Enslin, Berlin. [1837.??]
- 1851 u. 1853Geologische Bilder zur Geschichte der Erde und ihrer Bewohner, 2 Volumes.- Verlag von Otto Wigand, Leipzig, 312+326pp
- O. Taschenberg "Karl Hermann Konrad Burmeister" Leopoldina, 29: 43-46; 62-64; 78-82; 94–97. Halle (1893)
- C. Berg "Carlos Germán Conrado Burmeister. Bio (with a portrait)" Anales Museum of Natural History in Buenos Aires, 4: 315–357. Buenos Aires, Argentina (1895)
- C. Berg "Carlos Germán Conrado Burmeister. Bio" Anales de la Sociedad Argentina Science, 41: 97-107. Buenos Aires, Argentina (1896)
- Anonymous "Germán Burmeister, 25 † anniversary of his death" Physis, 3 (14): 305–306. Buenos Aires, Argentina (1917)
- B. Houssay "The personality of German Burmeister" Physis, 19 (53): 279–283. Buenos Aires, Argentina (1942)
- WITNESS Mendilaharzu "Burmeister unpublished" Deutsche Lehrerzeitung für Argentinien: 22–25. Buenos Aires, Argentina (1942)
- C. Withaus "Germán Bumeister. Memorias del Museo de Entre Rios." Parana Province of Entre Rios, Argentina (1942)
- G. Araoz Alfaro "A wise German in the service of Argentina, German Burmeister" Argentine-German cultural institutions, pp. 1–15. Buenos Aires, Argentina (1943)
- R. Ardissone "Homage to Burmeister. Burmeister contribution to geography" Bulletin EAG, (35): 9-10. Buenos Aires, Argentina (1957)
- A. Burkart "Burmeister as botanical" Revista de la Universidad Nacional de la Plata, 4: 89–95. La Plata, Buenos Aires, Argentina (1958)
- M. Buraben "Germán Burmeister, his life, his work" Cultural issues Argentinas, pp. 1–95. Buenos Aires, Argentina (1968)
- K. Müller "Hermann Burmeister" Die Natur, 36 (NF, 13): 136–138. Halle (1887)
- M. Asua "Official support for the Physics Description de la République Argentine H. Burmeister" Quipu, 6 (3): 339–353. México (1989)
- NT Auza "Germán Burmeister and Paleontological Society 1866-1868" Investigations and Trials, 46: 137–155. National History Academy. Buenos Aires, Argentina (1997)

== Other works ==
- Beiträge zur Naturgeschichte der Rankenfüsser (Cirripedia)
- El Campo del Cielo (Territorio del Chaco): extracto de un informe presentado /por el naturalista viajero Carlos Burmeister
- Beschreibung einiger neuen oder weniger bekannten Schmarotzerkrebse : nebst allgemeinen Betrachtungen über die Gruppe, welcher sie angehören
- Die Labyrinthodonten aus dem bunten Sandstein von Bernburg: zoologisch geschildert
- Die Organisation der Trilobiten aus ihren lebenden Verwandten entwickelt: nebst einer systematischen Uebersicht aller zeither beschriebenen Arten
- The organization of trilobites, deduced from their living affinities: with a systematic review of the species hitherto (with Thomas Bell and Edward Forbes)
- Systematische Uebersicht der Thiere Brasiliens: welche während einer Reise durch die Provinzen von Rio de Janeiro und Minas geraës gesammlt oder beobachtet Wurden (Vols. 1-3)
- Beiträge zur näheren Kenntniss der Gattung Tarsius
- Lehrbuch der Naturgeschichte
- Revision del género Ecpantheria
- Description physique de la République Argentine d'après des observations personelles et étrangères (with Emile Daireaux, and E. Maupas) (Vols. 1-5)
- Genera quædam insectorum. Iconibus illustravit et descripsit Hermannus Burmeister ...
- Grundiss der Naturgeschichte: Für Gymnasien und höhere Bürgerschulen
- A Manual of entomology, / tr. from the German of Dr. Herman Burmeister by W. E. Shuckard, with additions by the author, and original notes and plates by the translator

== Taxon described by him ==
- See Category:Taxa named by Hermann Burmeister
