= Bernardino Rivadavia Natural Sciences Argentine Museum =

Public museum in Buenos Aires, Argentina

Bernardino Rivadavia Natural Sciences Museum
- Museo Argentino de Ciencias Naturales; Bernardino Rivadavia
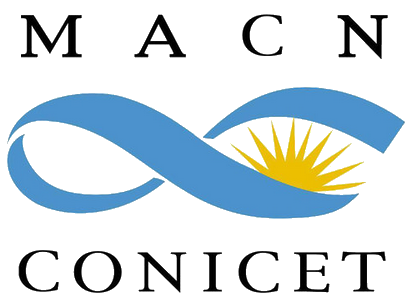

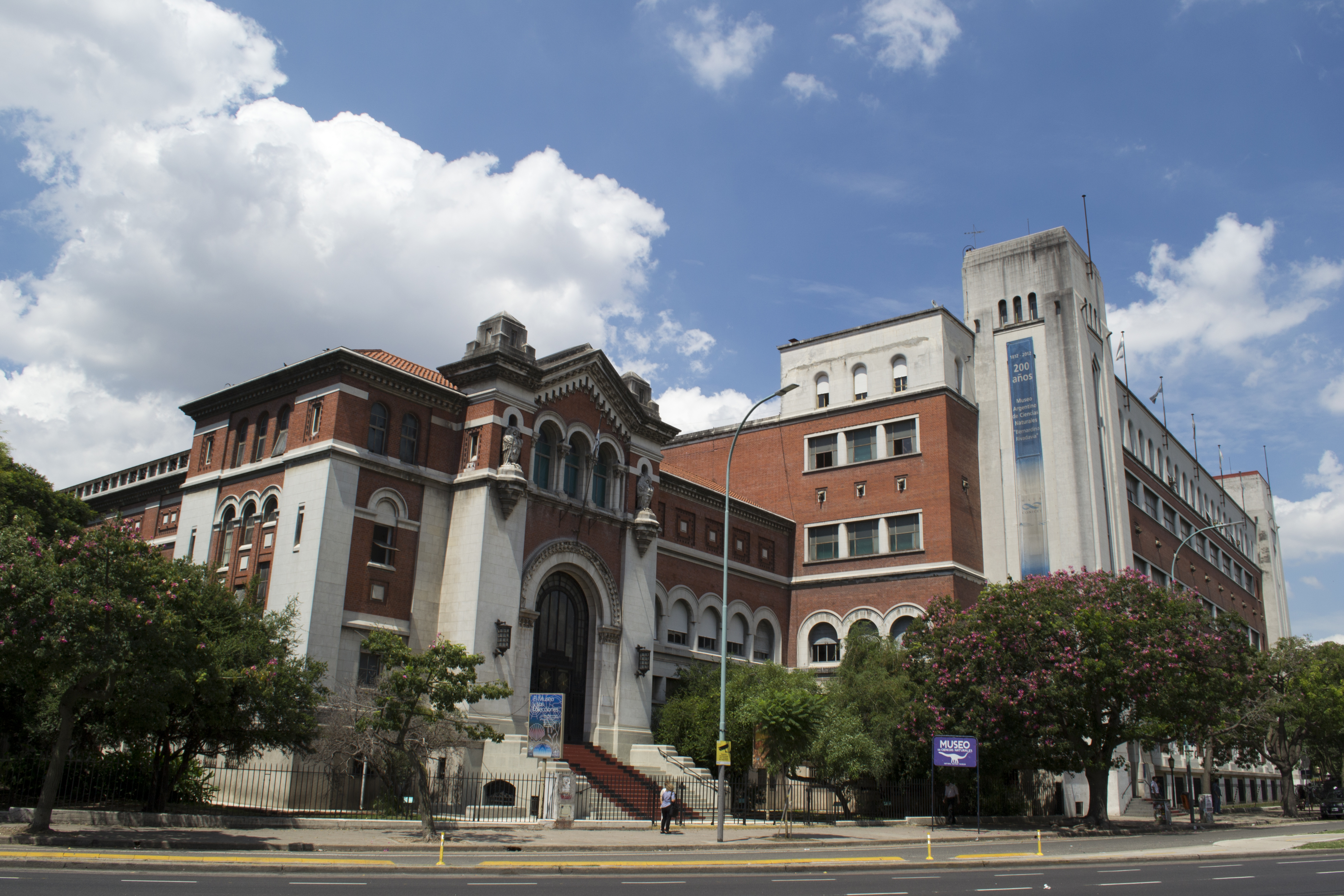
- The museum building as seen in 2014
- Established: June 27, 1812; 214 years ago
- Location: Caballito, Buenos Aires
- Coordinates: 34.605278°S 58.438056°W
- Type: Natural science museum
- Public transit access: Ángel Gallardo Metro station, Line B
- Website: macnconicet.gob.ar

The Bernardino Rivadavia Natural Sciences Argentine Museum (Spanish: Museo Argentino de Ciencias Naturales Bernardino Rivadavia) is a public museum located in the Caballito neighborhood of Buenos Aires, Argentina.

== History ==
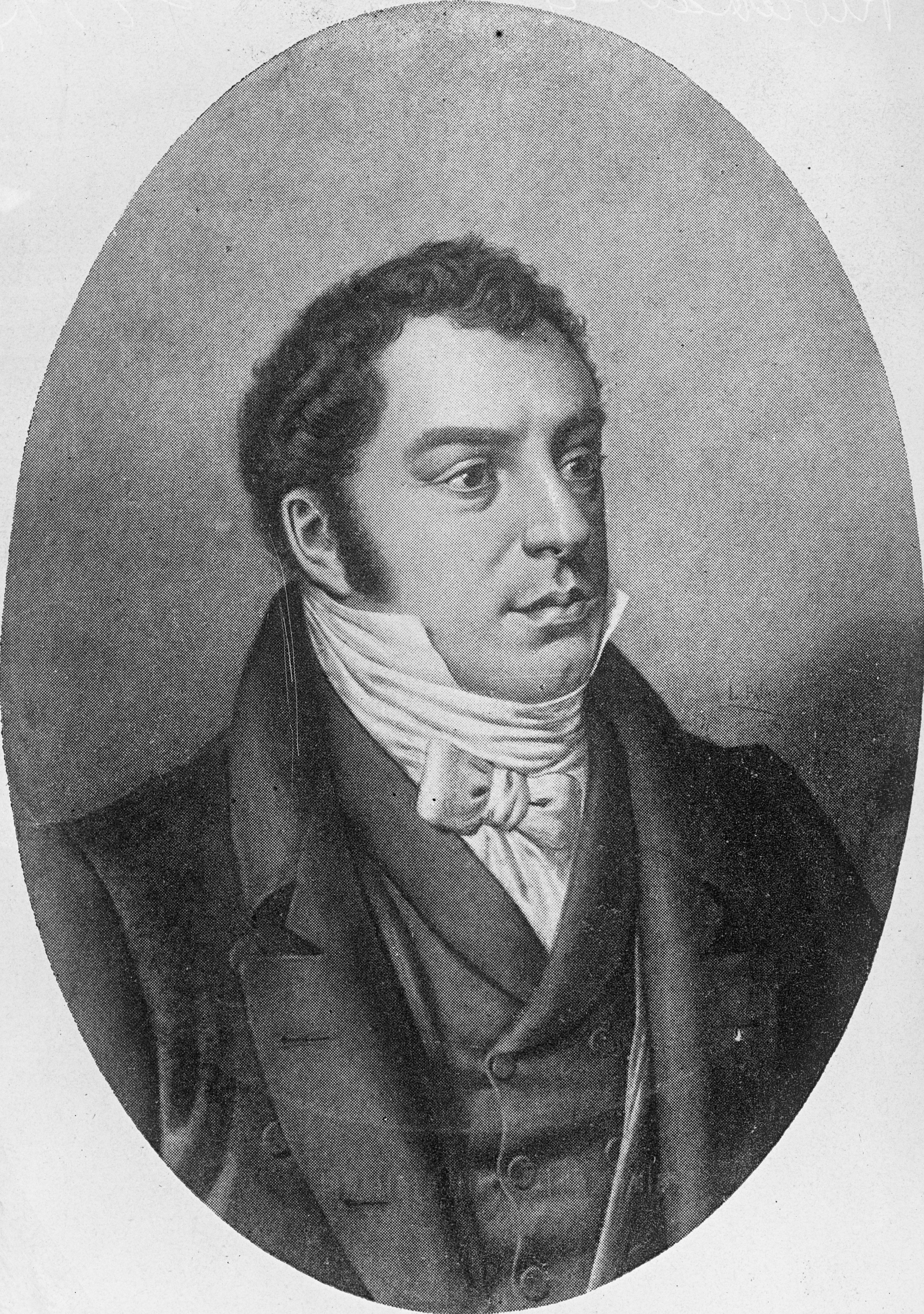
The museum is named after Bernardino Rivadavia, who proposed its creation in 1812

The museum owes its existence to a proposal made by Bernardino Rivadavia before the First Triumvirate of the United Provinces of the Río de la Plata in 1812. The ongoing struggle for Independence from the Spanish colonial period stalled Rivadavia's project, however, until 1823, when he promoted construction of a building for the museum as a member of Governor Martín Rodríguez's cabinet.

The original museum opened in 1826 and was housed downtown in a loft inside the Santo Domingo Convent, which had been made available to host Rivadavia after his expulsion of the Dominican order from Buenos Aires. Rivadavia closely oversaw the construction of the institution, the first of its kind in South America, and appointed Italian Argentine botanist Carlos Ferraris as its first director. Receiving a large gift of materials and equipment from Presbyterian Minister Bartolomé Muñoz in 1813, the museum started with a collection of 800 animal and 1500 mineral specimens, among others. Rivadavia also appointed a noted Italian astronomer, Ottaviano Fabrizio Mossotti, who installed the nation's first observatory, meteorological station and experimental physics laboratory during his tenure at the facility from 1828 to 1835. Among those who consulted the museum's growing staff of researchers was Alexander von Humboldt, who requisitioned numerous meteorological studies for the Institut de France.

The rise of the paramount Governor of Buenos Aires, Juan Manuel de Rosas, turned to be the renowned institution's undoing. Devoutly religious, Governor Rosas returned the convent to the Dominican order in October 1835, forcing the museum to relocate to smaller, nearby buildings. Much of its equipment and research was lost during the forced relocation, and Ferrari and Mossotti returned to Italy. Rosas' overthrow in 1852 helped lead to the creation of the Society of Friends of Natural History, who had the museum relocated in 1854 to the "Illuminated block," the former Temple of St. Ignatius and its prestigious academy maintained by the Jesuits before their suppression in 1773. The recovering of the museum motivated the German naturalist Hermann Burmeister to stay in Buenos Aires. A visit to the museum followed in 1857. Recommended by Humboldt, Herman was appointed as its director in 1862. Burmeister founded the Argentine Paleontological Society in concert with the University of Buenos Aires and the Academy of Natural Sciences in Córdoba in 1870, extending the interest for the field to the nation's hinterland. Burmeister also founded the museum's first periodical in 1874, opening the museum and its research to active peer review. Notable among the European researchers who took notice was Dutch zoologist Hendrik Weyenbergh, who arrived in Córdoba, where he founded the Argentine National Academy of Sciences.

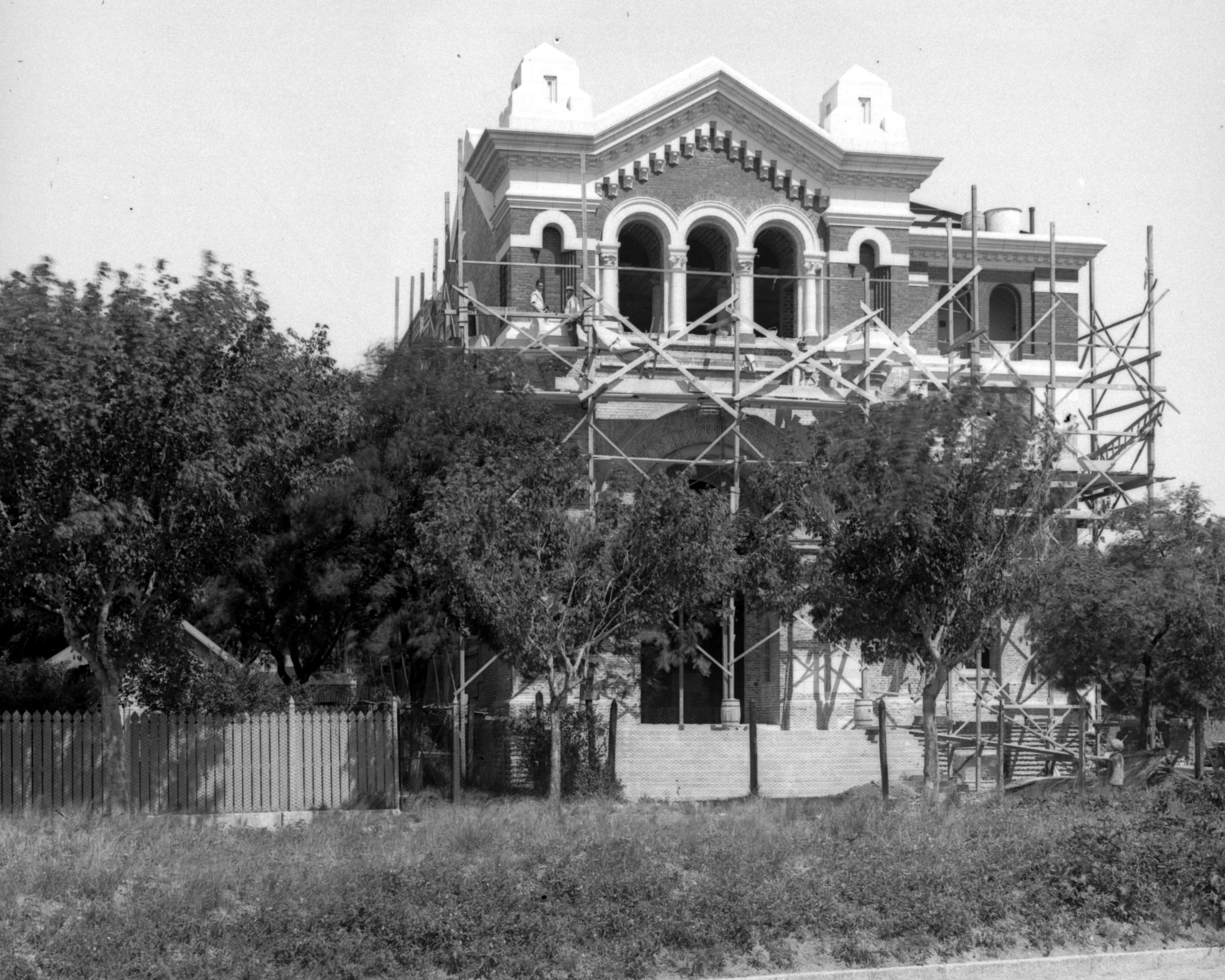
The current seat of the museum in Caballito, Buenos Aires, under construction. It was opened in 1937

The museum published numerous works under Burmeister's direction, who also donated a sizable part of its growing collection for the sake of the new La Plata Museum in 1884. An accident at the museum cost its noted German Argentine director his life in 1892. The museum was later directed by zoologist Florentino Ameghino, its first Argentinian director. Ameghino incorporated adjoining buildings to the museum, which remained inadequate for its vast collection and facilities. Addressing this, Director Martín Doello-Jurado secured Congress' authorization for new museum facilities in 1925. Built on the western end of Parque Centenario. The first wing of the new museum was given in 1929 and the institution was inaugurated in 1937.

Part of the museum's collection was transferred to the University of Buenos Aires Ethnographic Museum during the administration of President Juan Perón, who dismissed Doello-Jurado in 1946 as part of a wider intervention in national academics. Perón, however, also ordered the construction in 1948 of the museum's annex, which housed the National Natural Sciences Institute. The museum was transferred to the National Research Council (CONICET) in 1996 and, continuing to thrive, an internet data bank was created for the museum in 2002.

Besides the Natural Sciences Institute, the museum houses thirteen permanent exhibition halls, including an aquarium, a display with specimens collected from Argentina's numerous research stations in Antarctica, a geological collection centered on meteorites found in Argentina, a paleontology section notable for its Carnotaurus, Eoraptor, Herrerasaurus and Patagosaurus fossils, among others, and a Cenozoic paleontology display featuring Glyptodon, Macrauchenia, Megatherium and Smilodon fossils. Academics and the general public can also avail themselves of a science auditorium, an art gallery, library and a café.

== Gallery ==
=== Collections ===
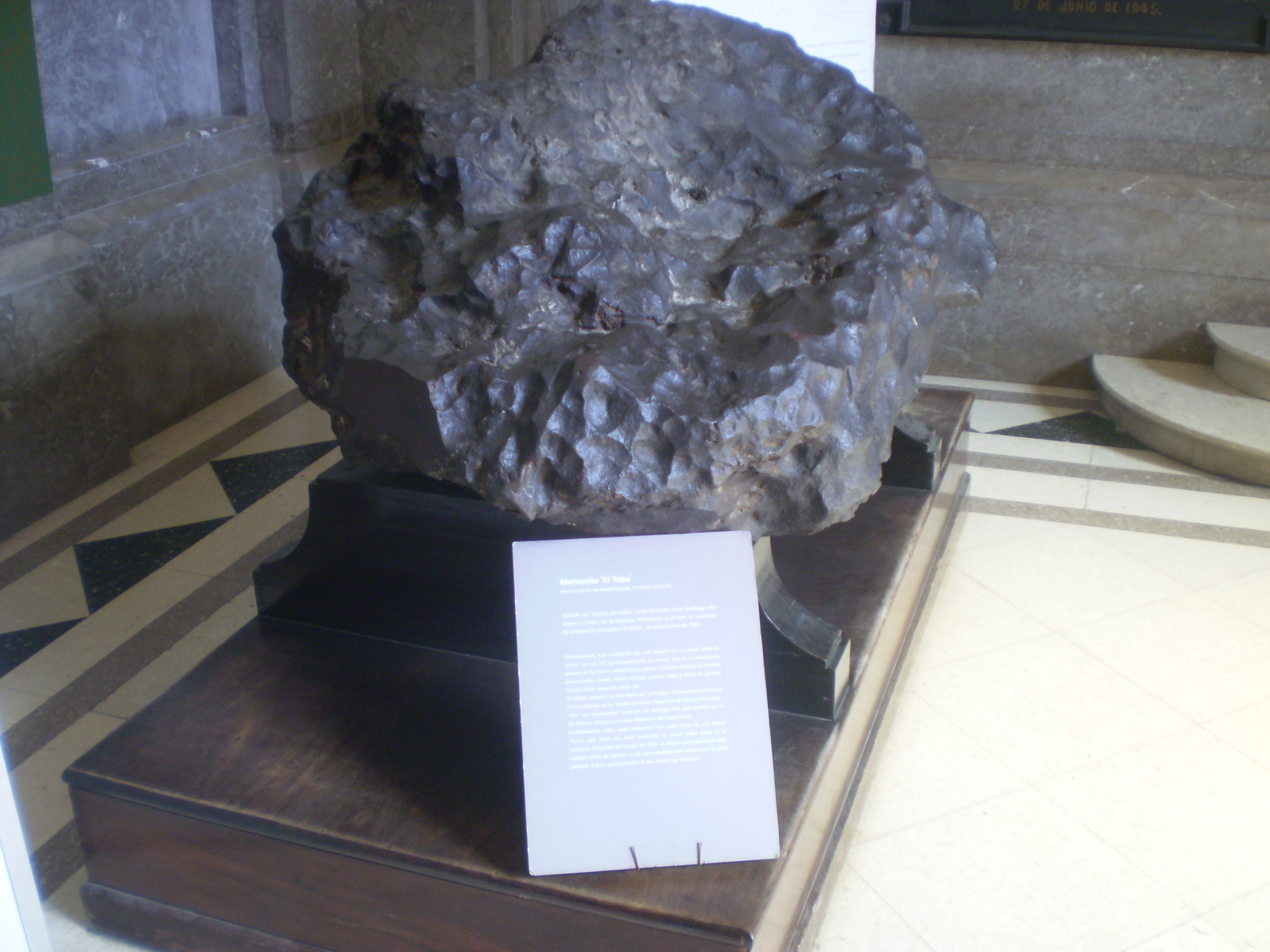

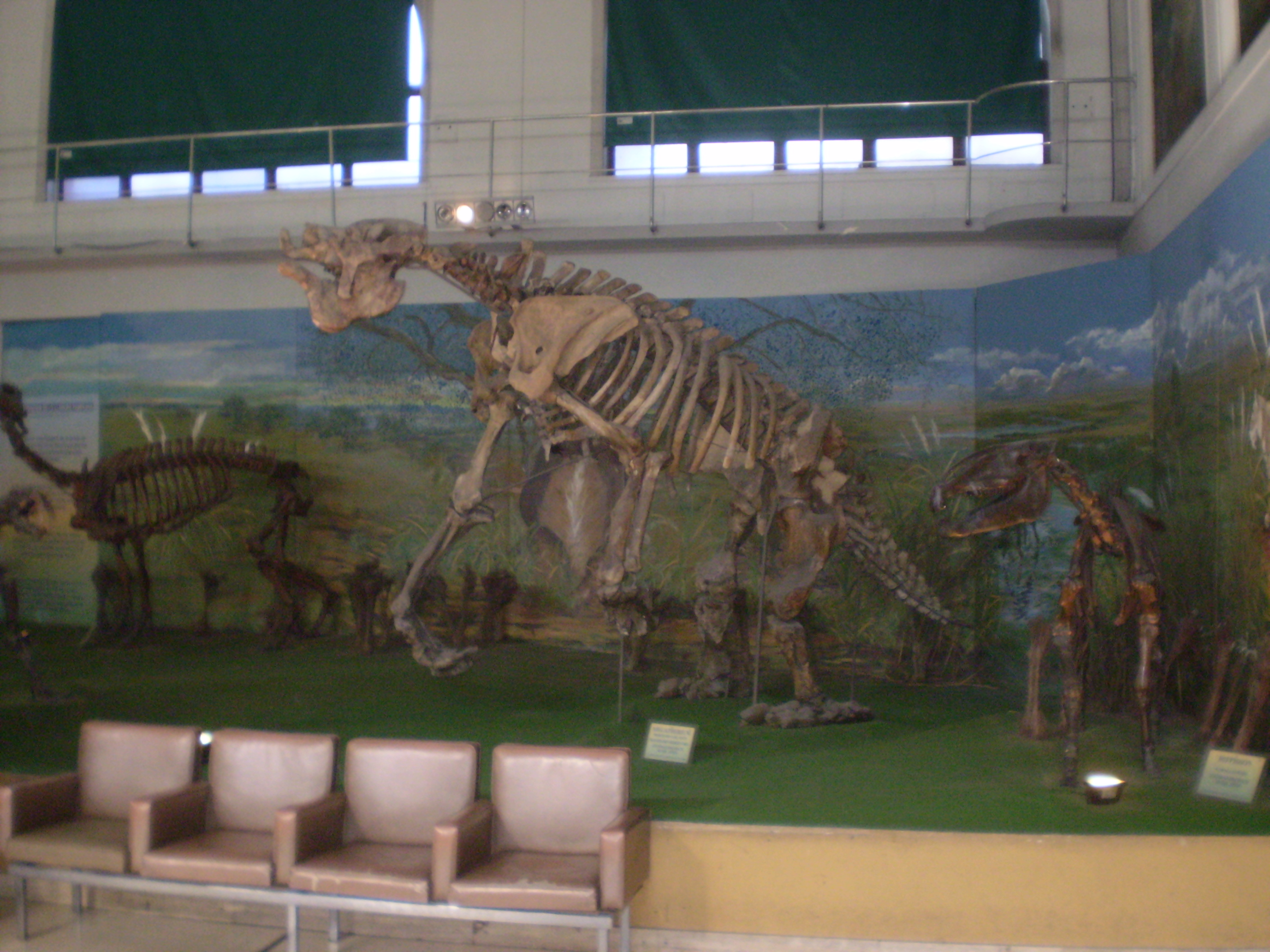

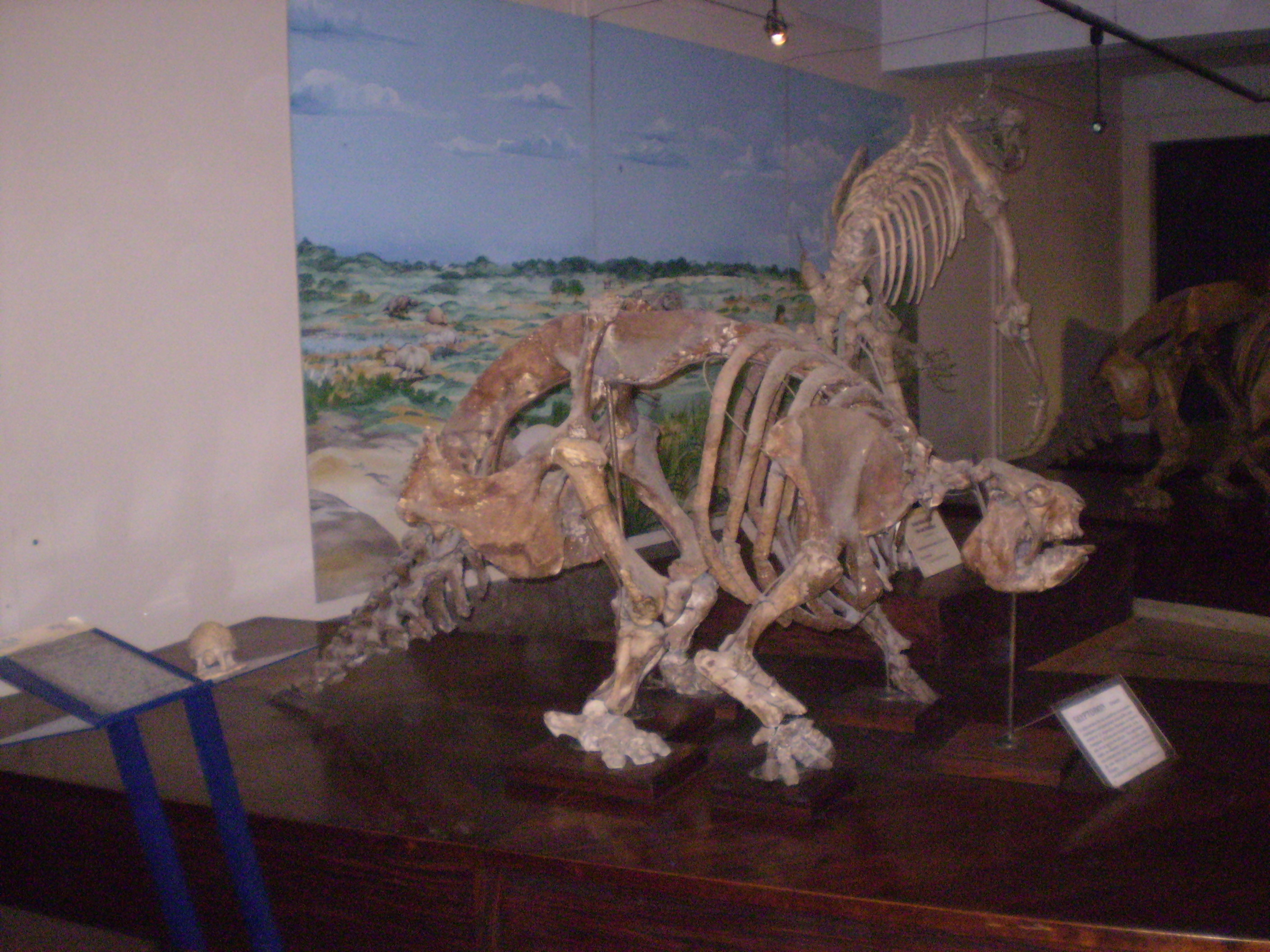

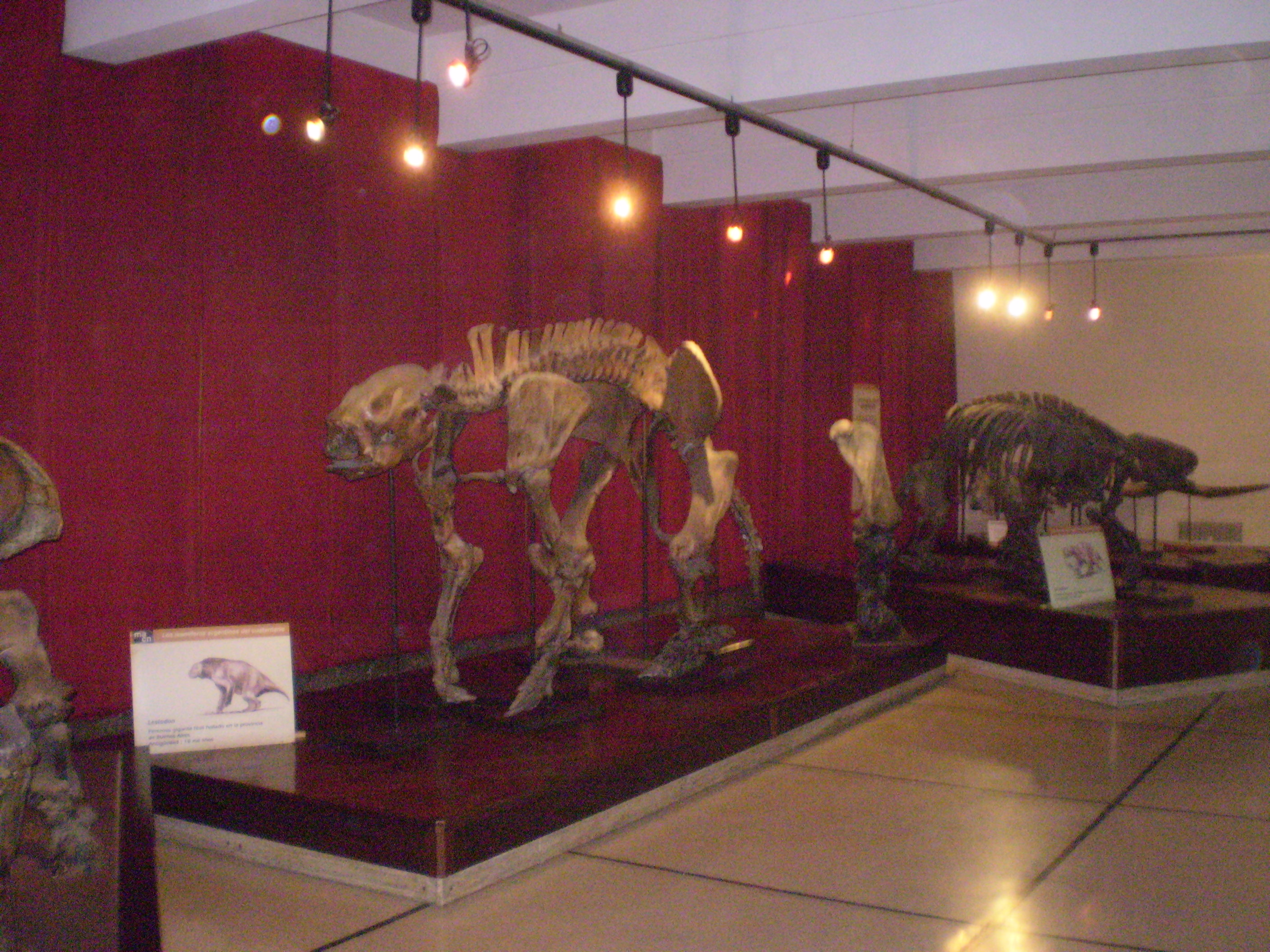

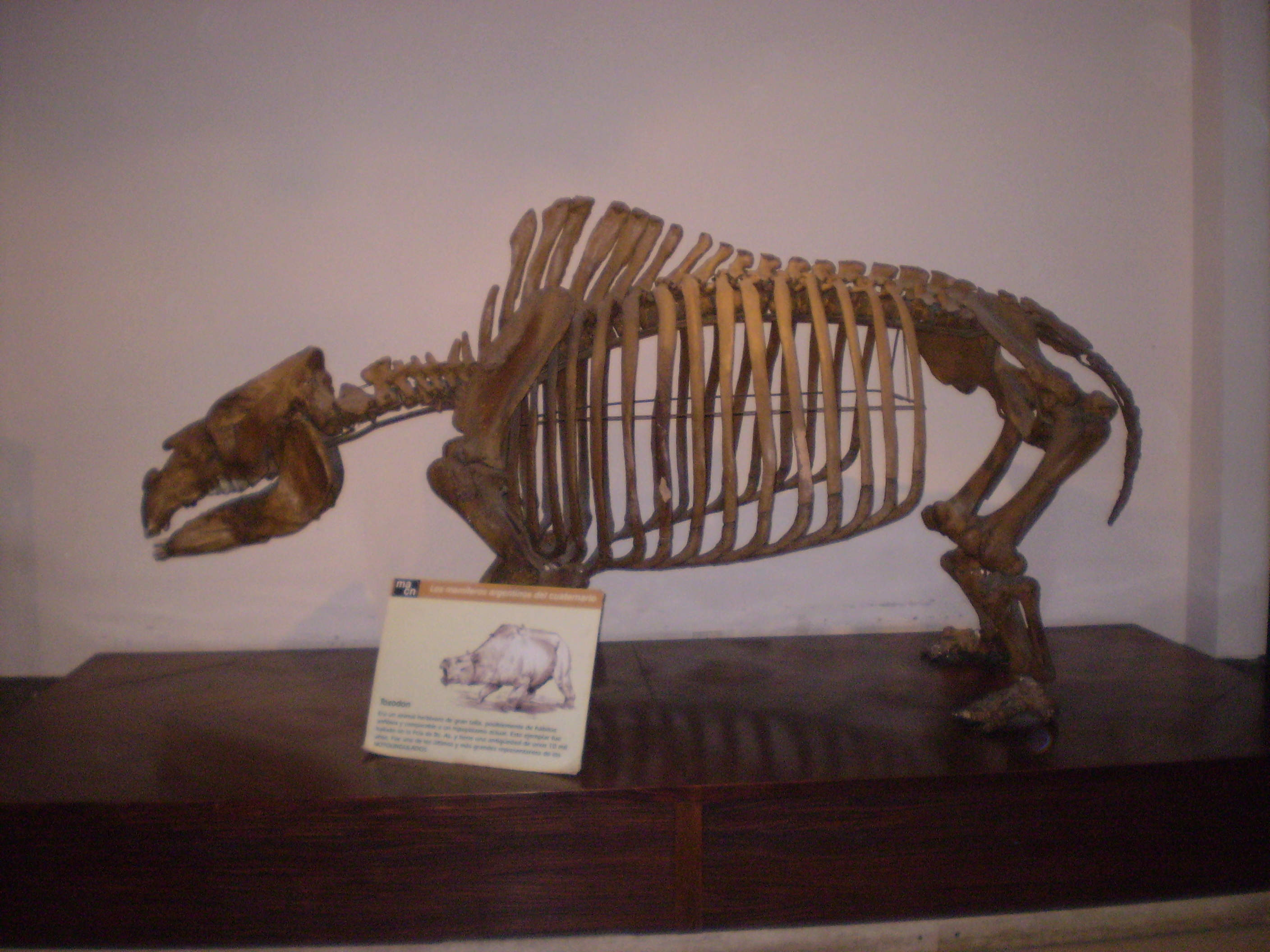

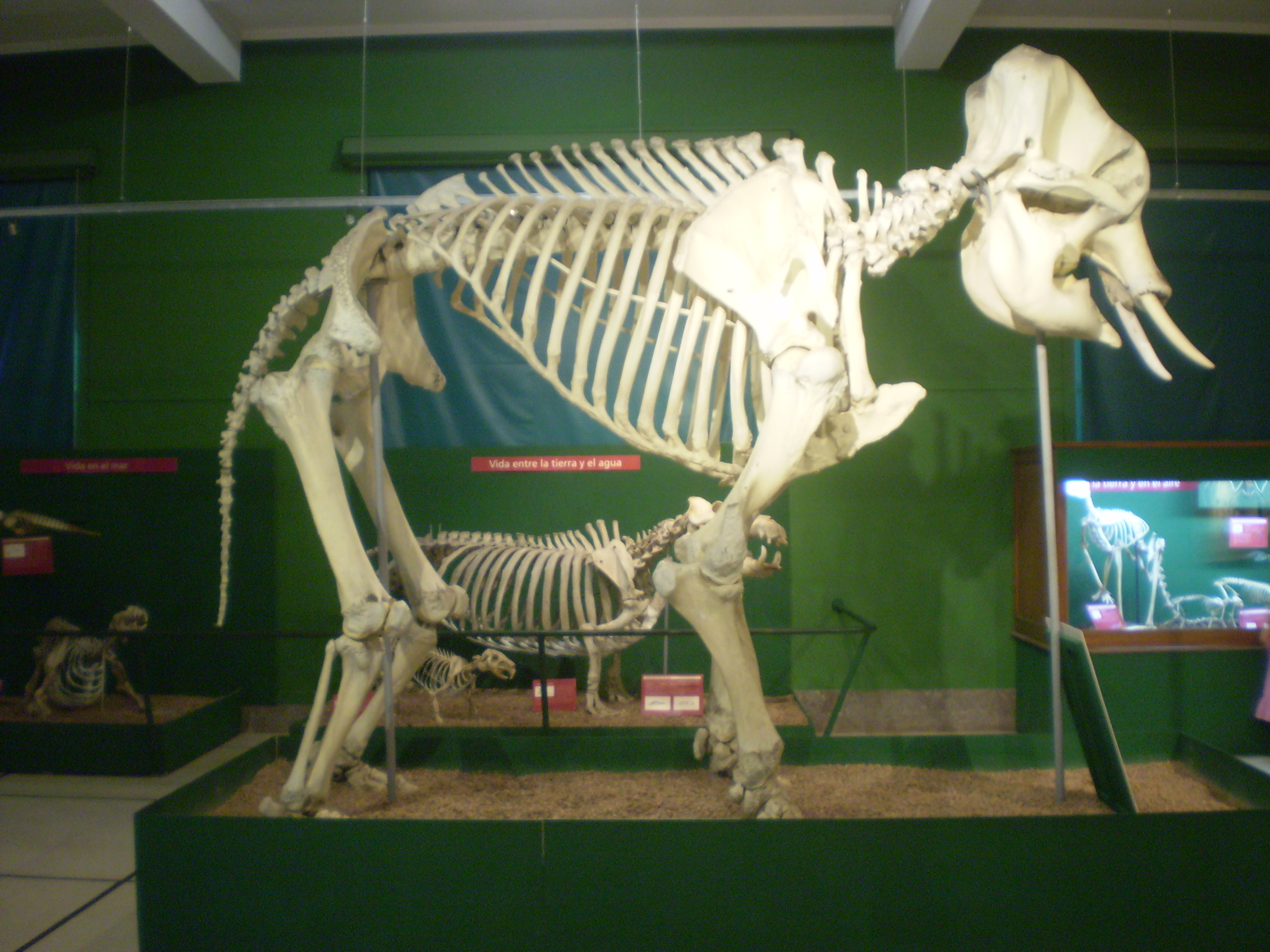

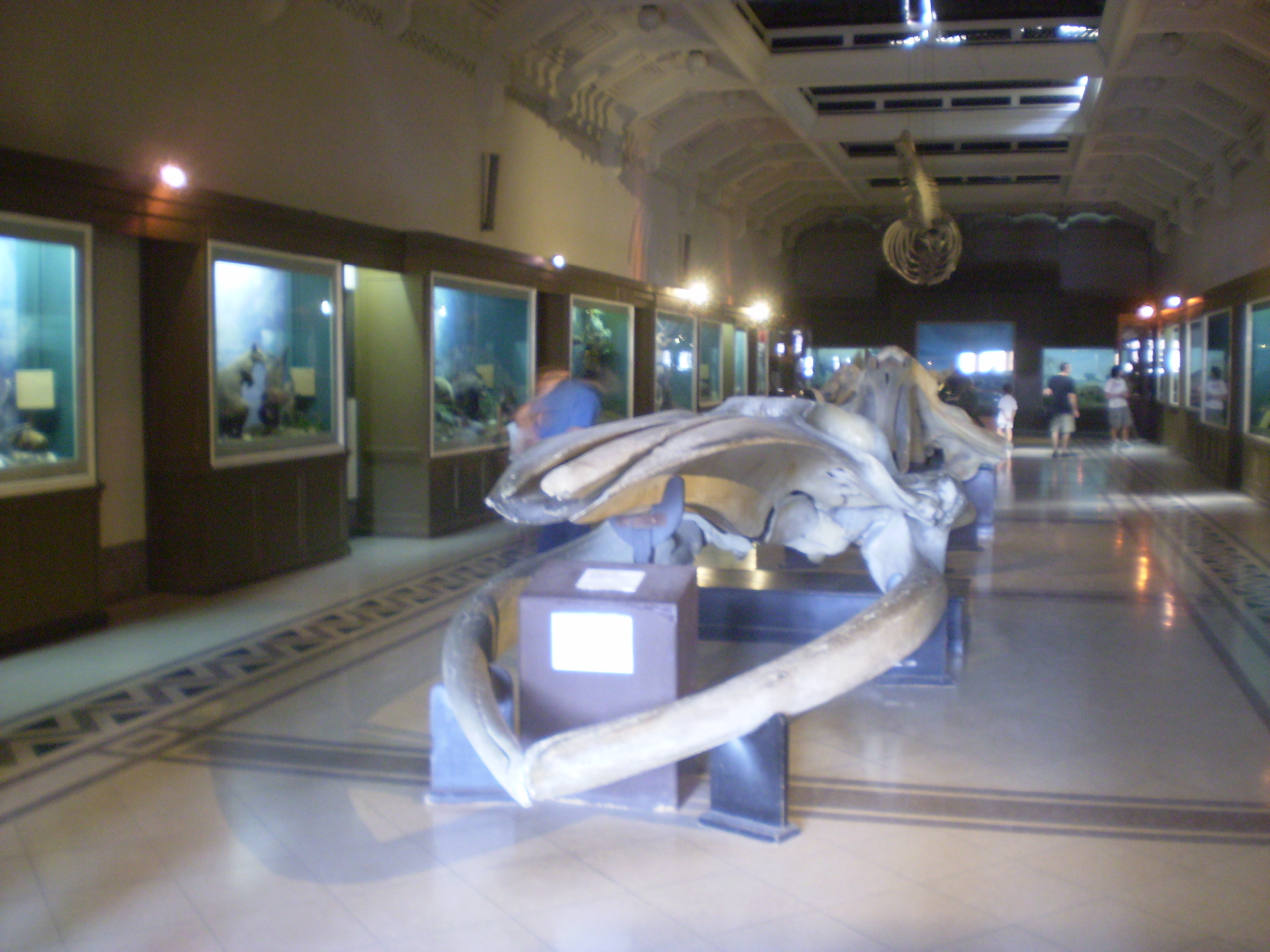

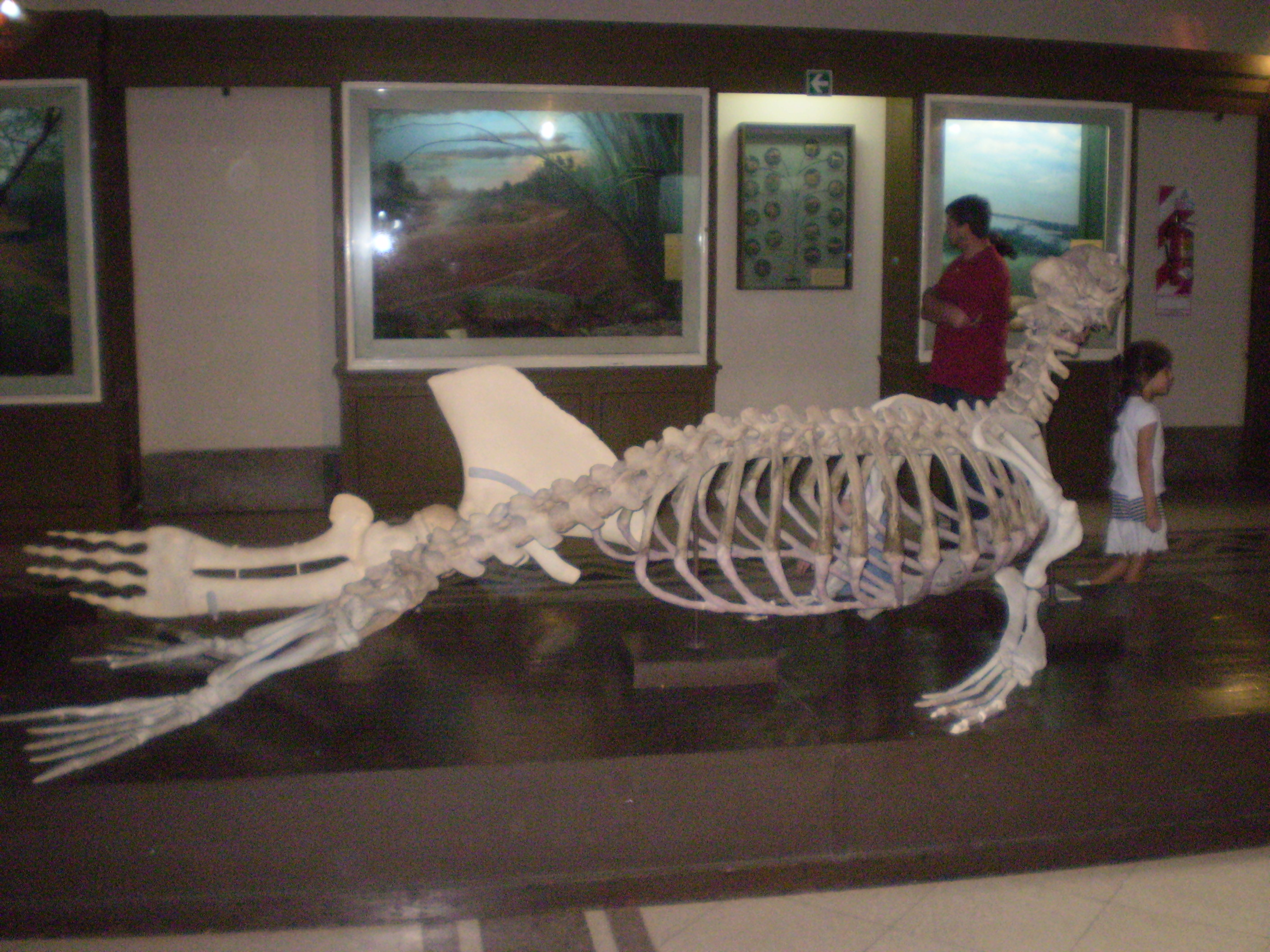

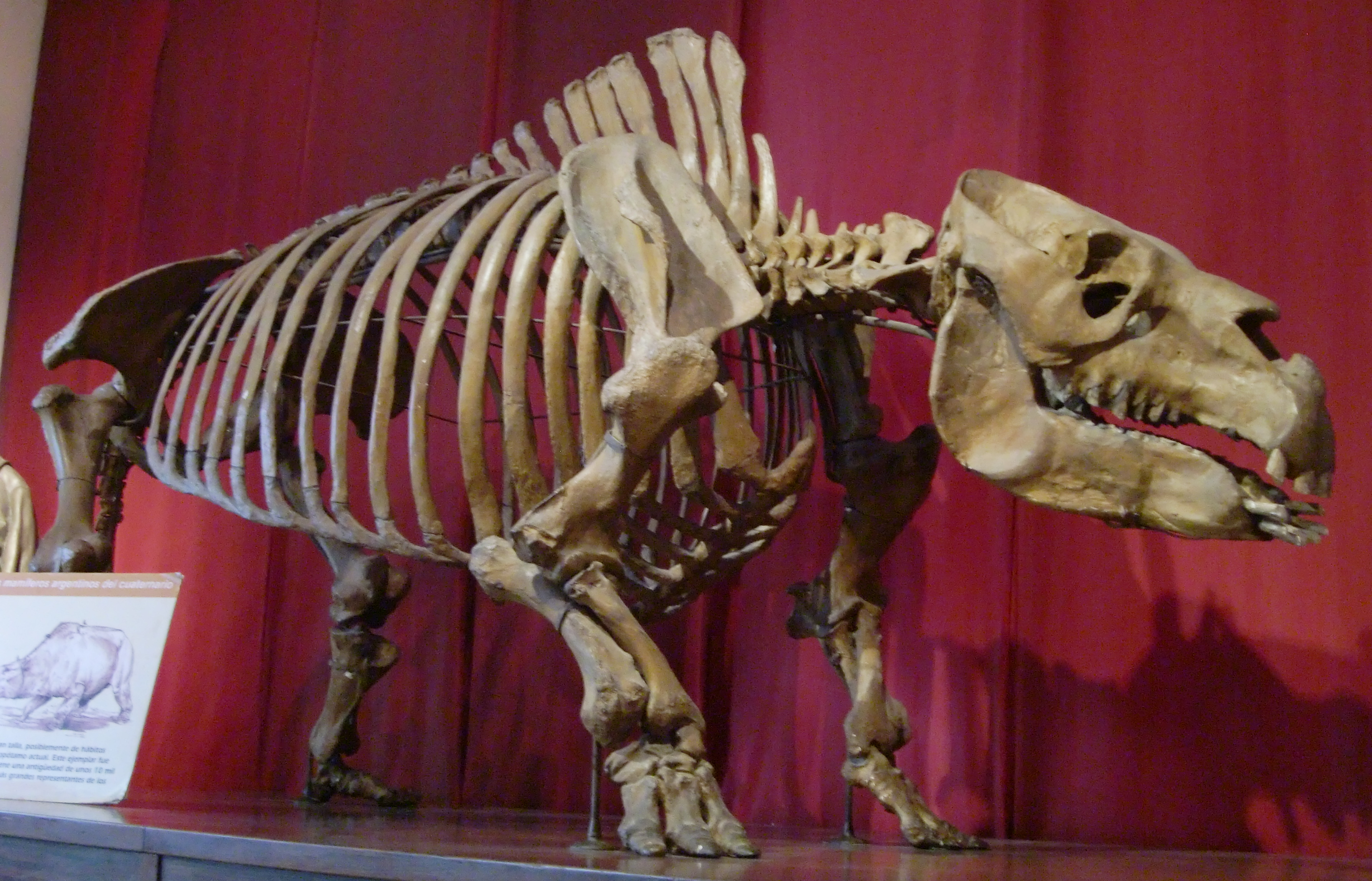

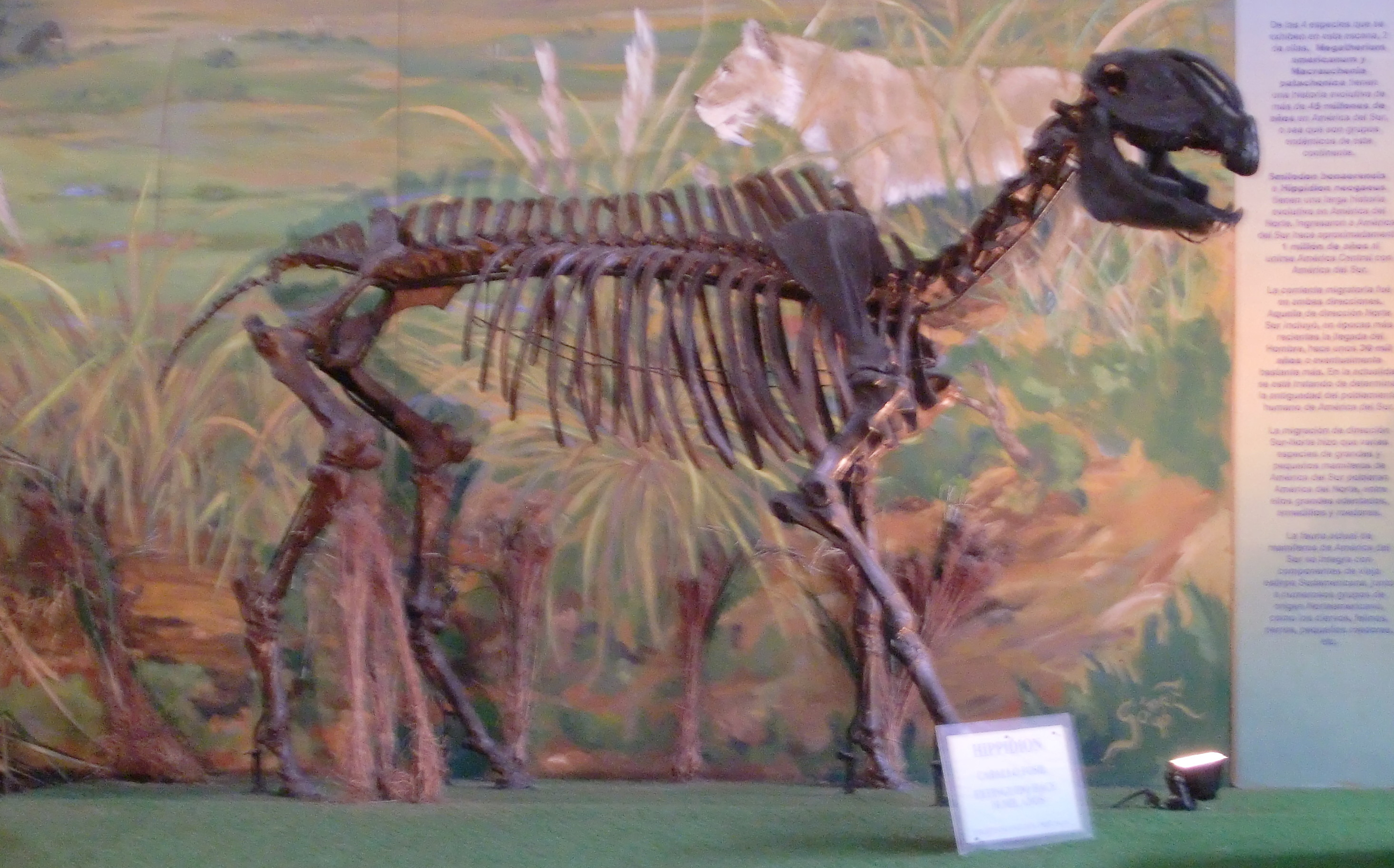

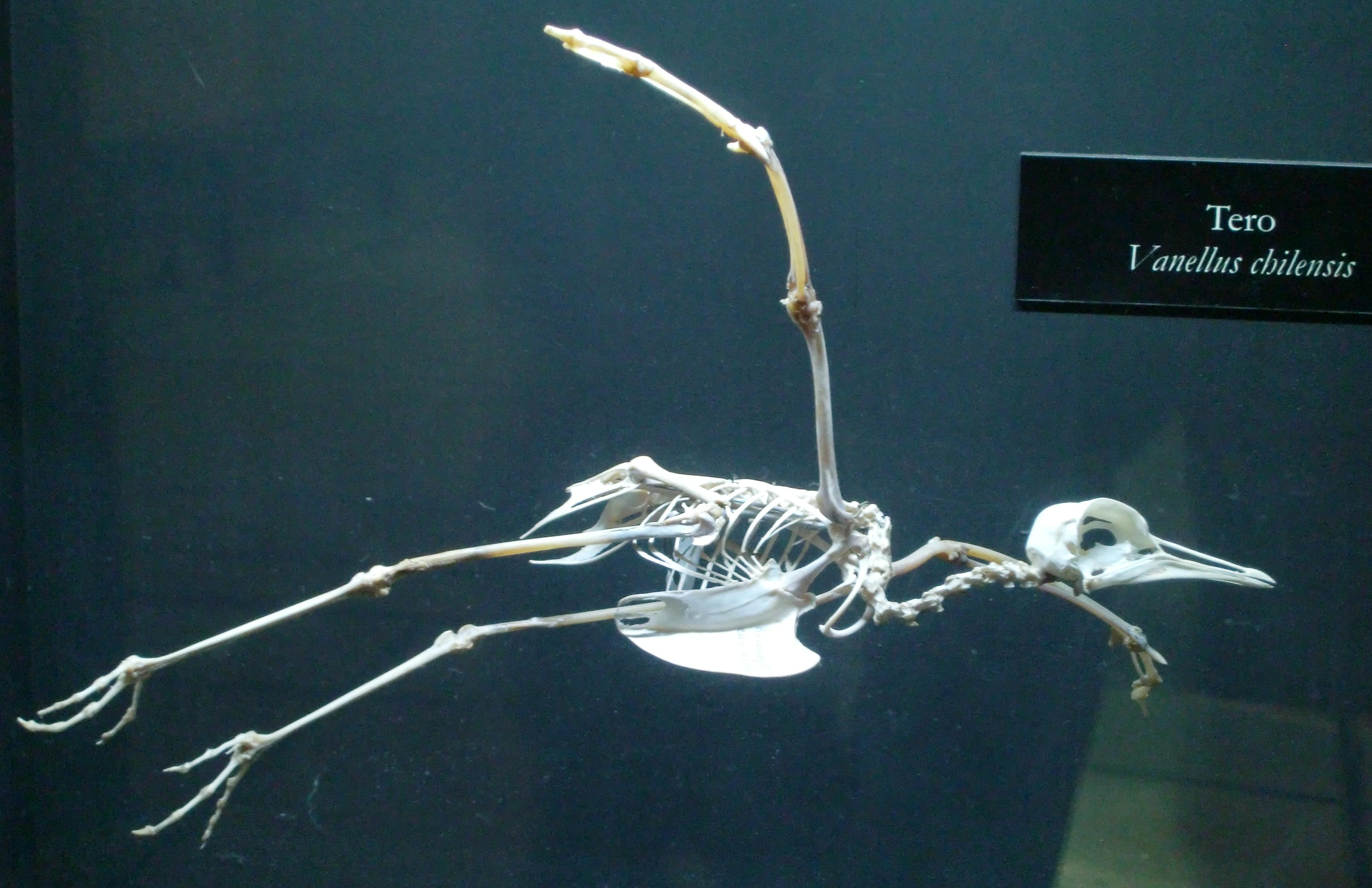

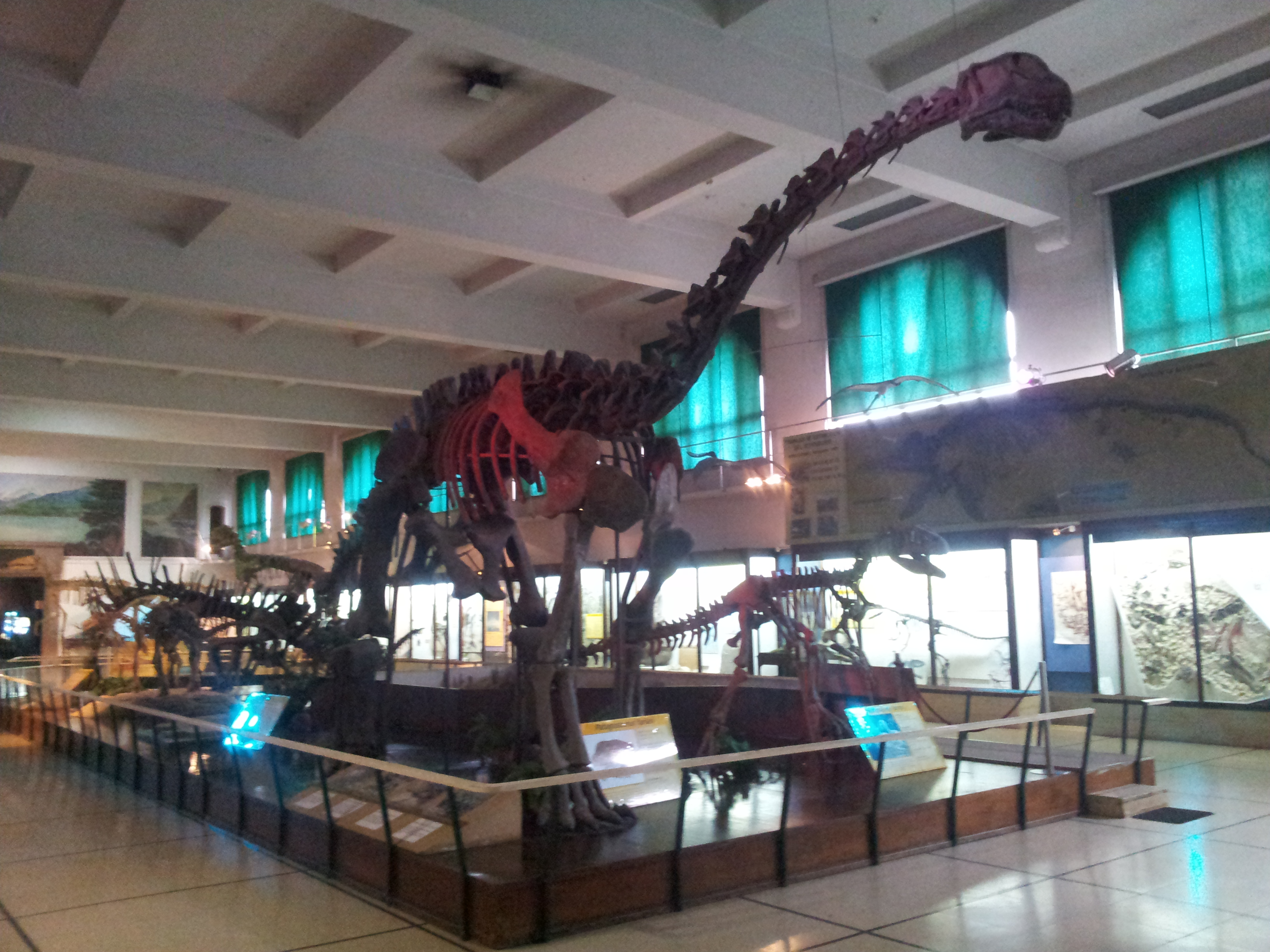

=== Building ===
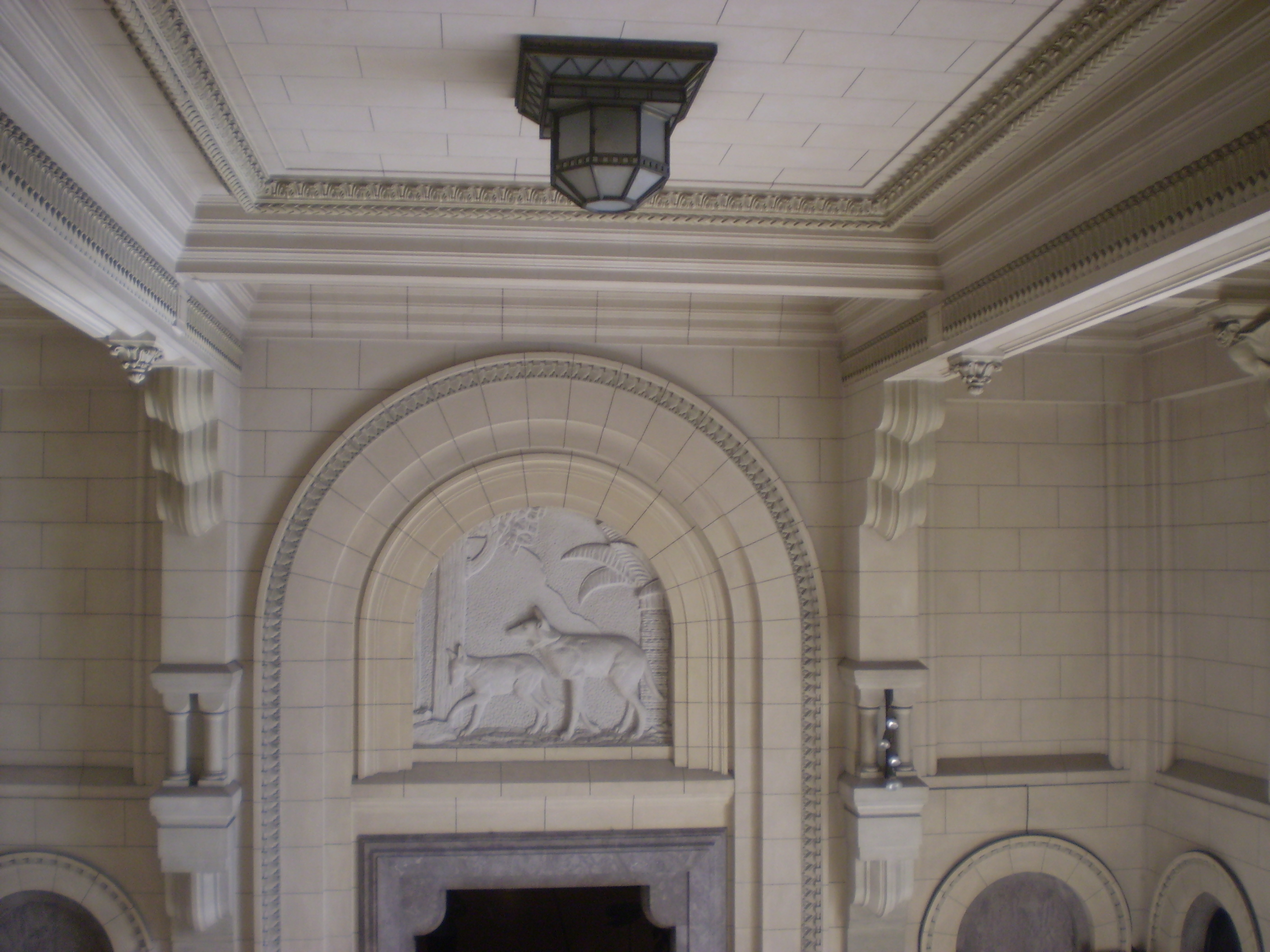

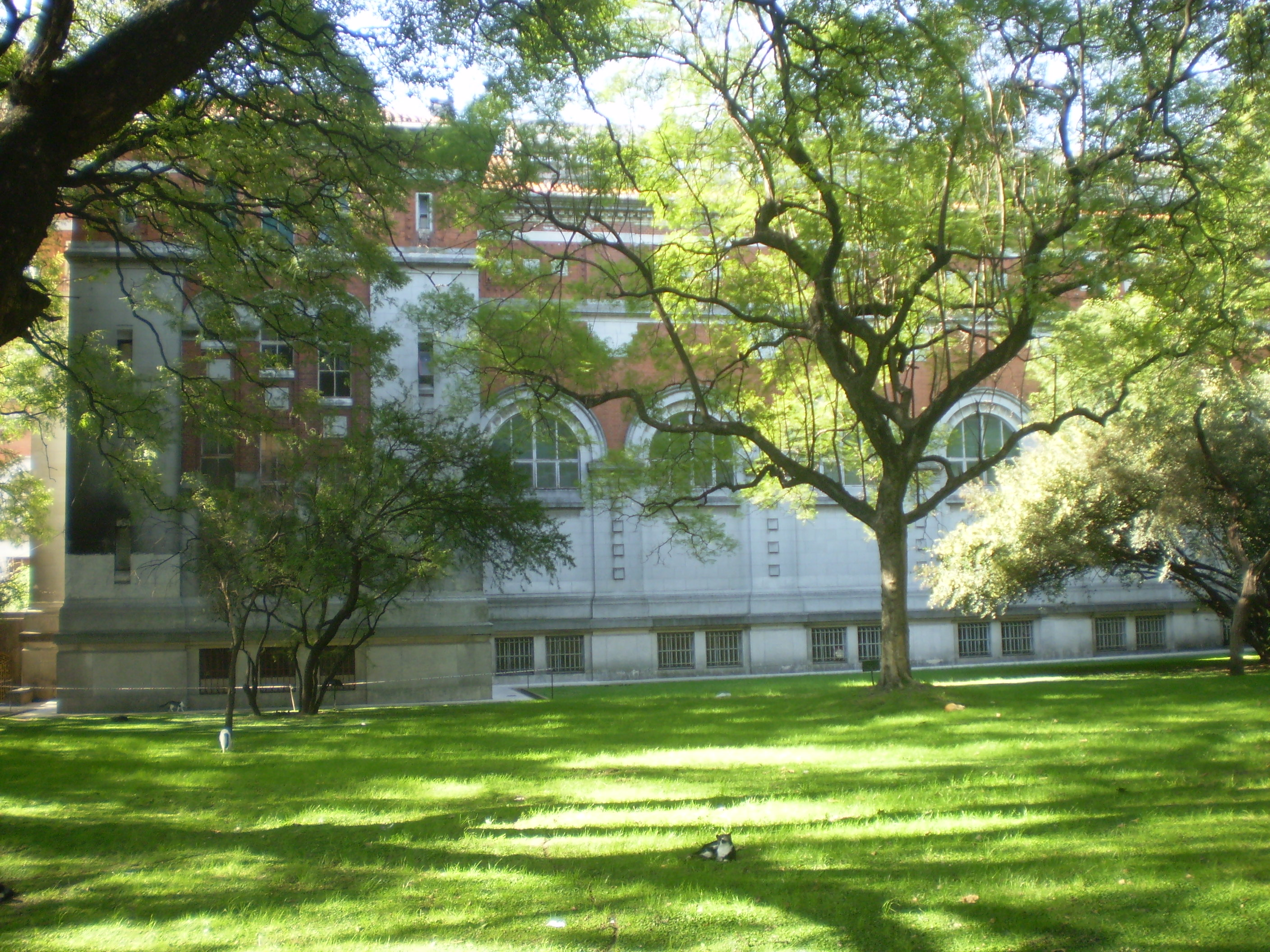

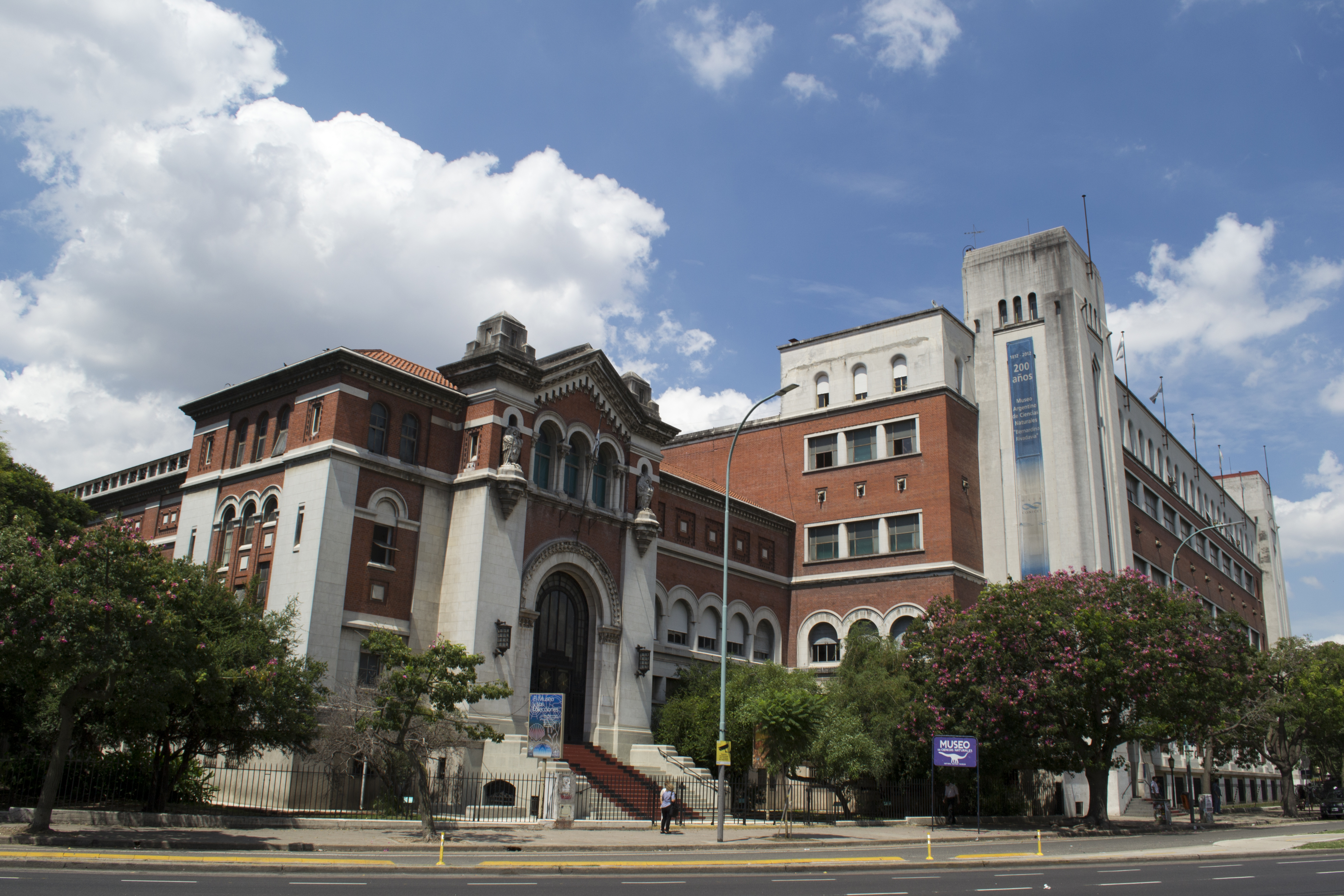

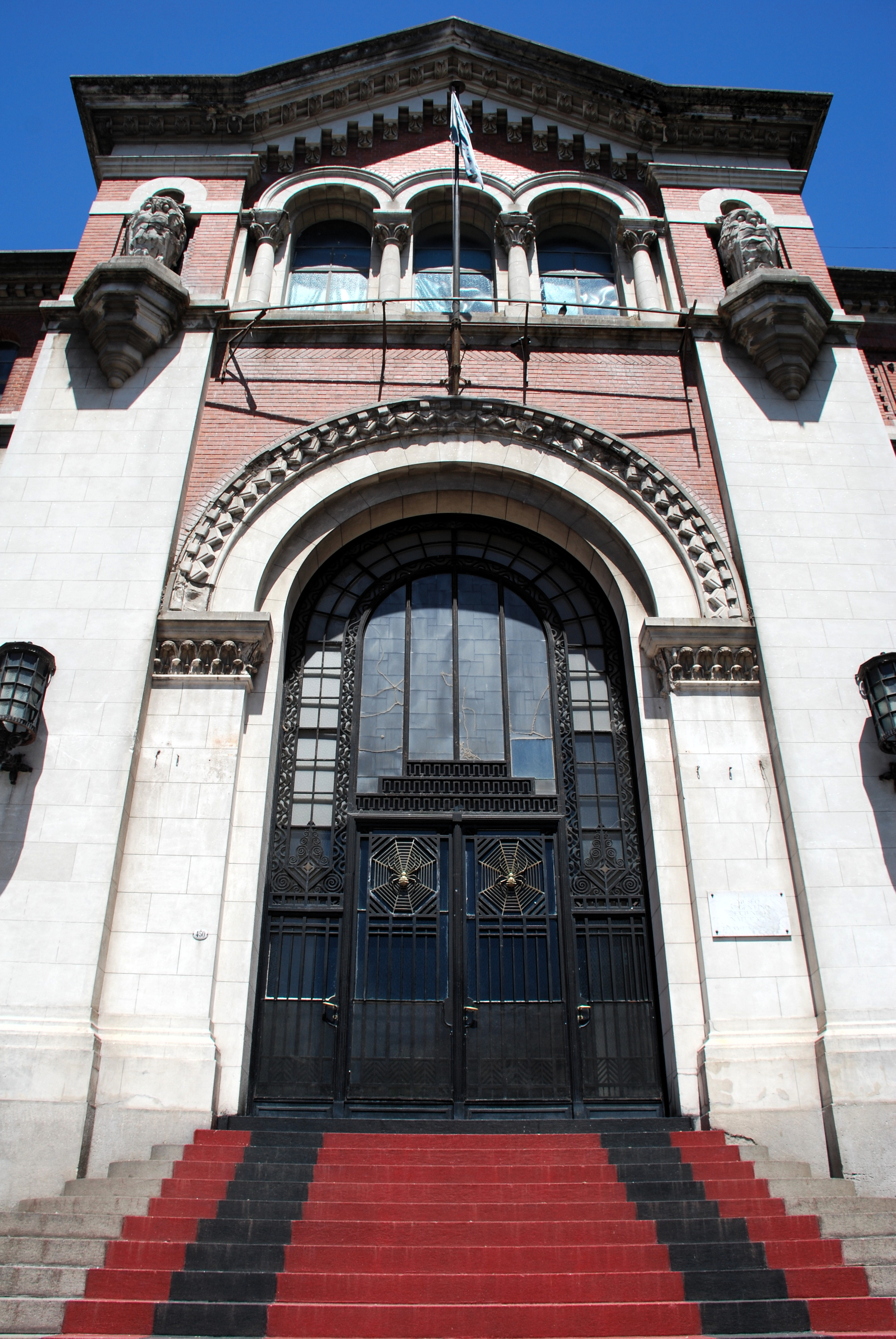

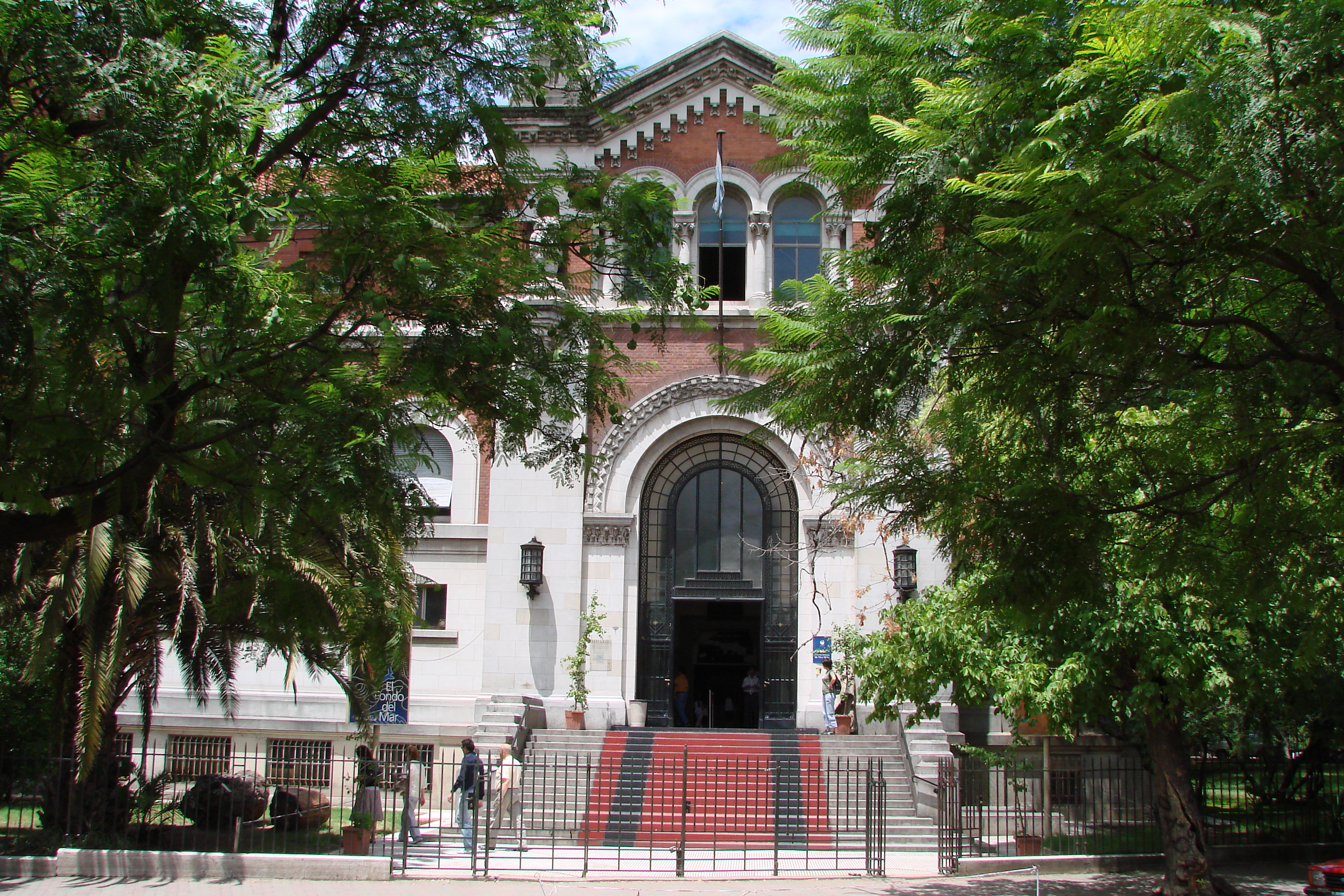

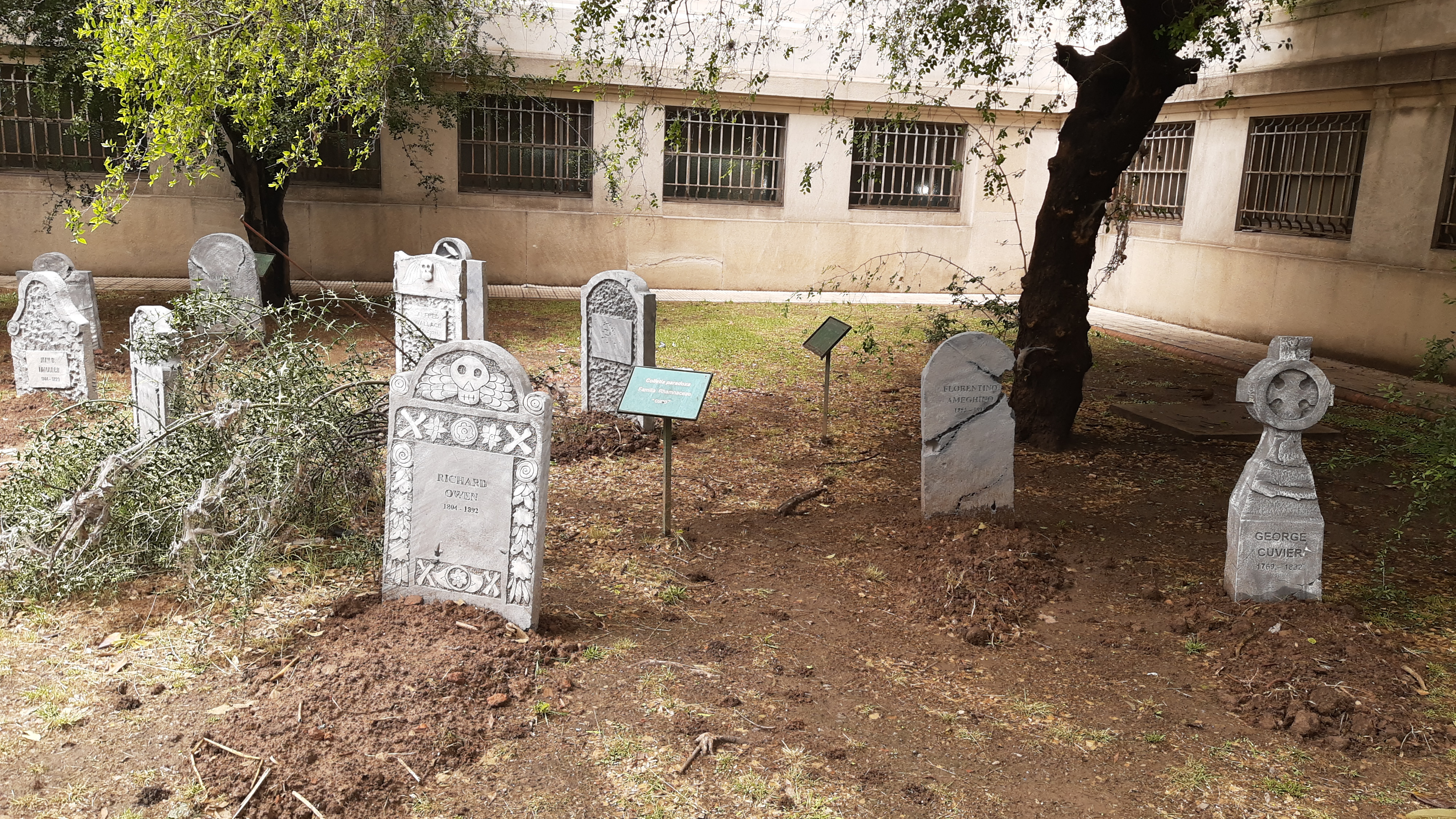
