= Caballito, Buenos Aires =

Coordinates: 34°37′S 58°27′W

Caballito
- Neighborhood of Buenos Aires
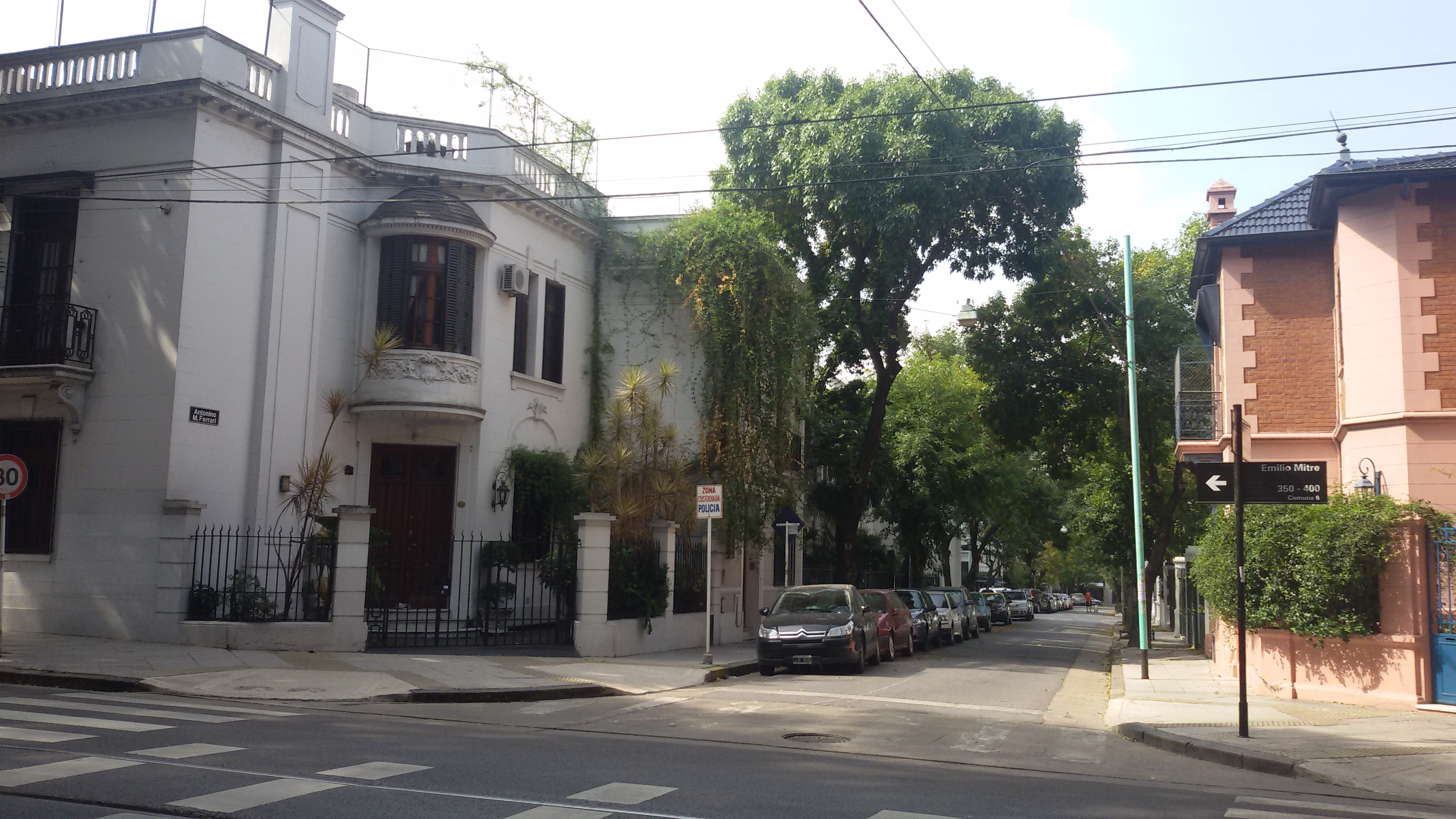
- Residential area of Caballito

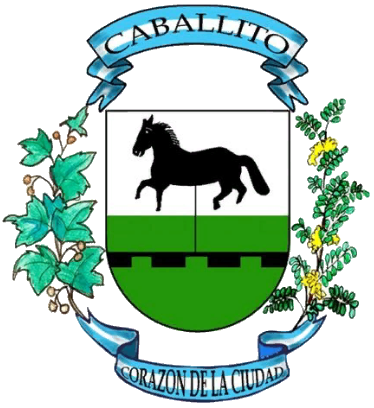
- Emblem
- Interactive map of Caballito
- Country: Argentina
- Autonomous City: Buenos Aires
- Comuna: C6
- Important sites: Ferro Carril Oeste, Buenos Aires Heritage Tramway, Parque Centenario

Area
  - Total: 7.1 km^{2} (2.7 sq mi)

Population (2022)
  - Total: 203,784
  - Density: 29,000/km^{2} (74,000/sq mi)
- Time zone: UTC-3 (ART)

Caballito (pronounced [kaβaˈʝito]; Spanish for "little horse") is a barrio (neighborhood) of the Argentine capital, Buenos Aires. It is the only barrio in the administrative division Comuna 6.

It is located in the geographical centre of the city, limited by the following streets and avenues: Rio de Janeiro, Av. Rivadavia, Av. La Plata, Av. Directorio, Curapaligüe, Av. Donato Álvarez, Av. Juan B. Justo, Av. San Martín, and Av. Ángel Gallardo.

The name is said to come from the horse-shaped (Spanish caballo) weather vane from a local pulpería (gauchos' bar); Caballito meaning "Little horse".

== Places of interest ==
In Caballito there are numerous points of interest; the "English District" with British style "Fin de Siècle" architecture, the Ferro Carril Oeste football Club (or "Verdolaga"), the "Historical Tramway museum of Buenos Aires", the old "Mercado del Progreso" (Market of Progress) a neighborhood favorite since 1890, the Italian Club and the Portuguese Club. Among the area's cultural points of interest are the Church of Caacupé, belonging to an order of Irish nuns although receiving its name to a sculpture dedicated to the Virgin of Caacupé, the Faculty of Philosophy and Literature of the University of Buenos Aires.

Another place of interest is the Cid Campeador monument, located at the corner of San Martín Avenue, Gaona Avenue, H. Pueyrredón Avenue, A. Gallardo Avenue and Díaz Vélez Avenue.

Area residents have relatively few large green spaces at their enjoyment; the two most important, however, are Parque Rivadavia, on Avenida Rivadavia, and the Parque Centenario. Opened to the public in 1910, Parque Centenario was so christened in honor of the hundredth anniversary of 25 May 1810, proclamation that later led to independence. Designed by renowned French-Argentine urbanist Charles Thays, the approximately 50-acre (200,000 m^{2}) park is one of Buenos Aires' largest as well as home to a concentration of public facilities; along the mile-long perimeter (a common jogging route), the park is home to Bernardino Rivadavia Natural Sciences Museum (Buenos Aires' most important), Marie Curie Hospital, the Leloir Research Institute and the local observatory. In 2006, the park underwent extensive refurbishment, as well as the installation of a swan lake in replacement of the two existing smaller ones.

== Transport ==
Neighbourhood commuters are served by Underground Line A, opened in 1913 as the city's (and the Southern Hemisphere's) first Underground line. The neighbourhood has a long historical connection with the Underground, since it is the site of the Polvorín Workshop, where the line's La Brugeoise rolling stock was repaired. The workshop is now the site of the Buenos Aires Heritage Tramway, which runs through the neighbourhood.

Similarly, there is the Sarmiento Line, a commuter rail service which takes passengers westward to Greater Buenos Aires or eastward to Once railway station and closer to the city centre.

== Gallery ==
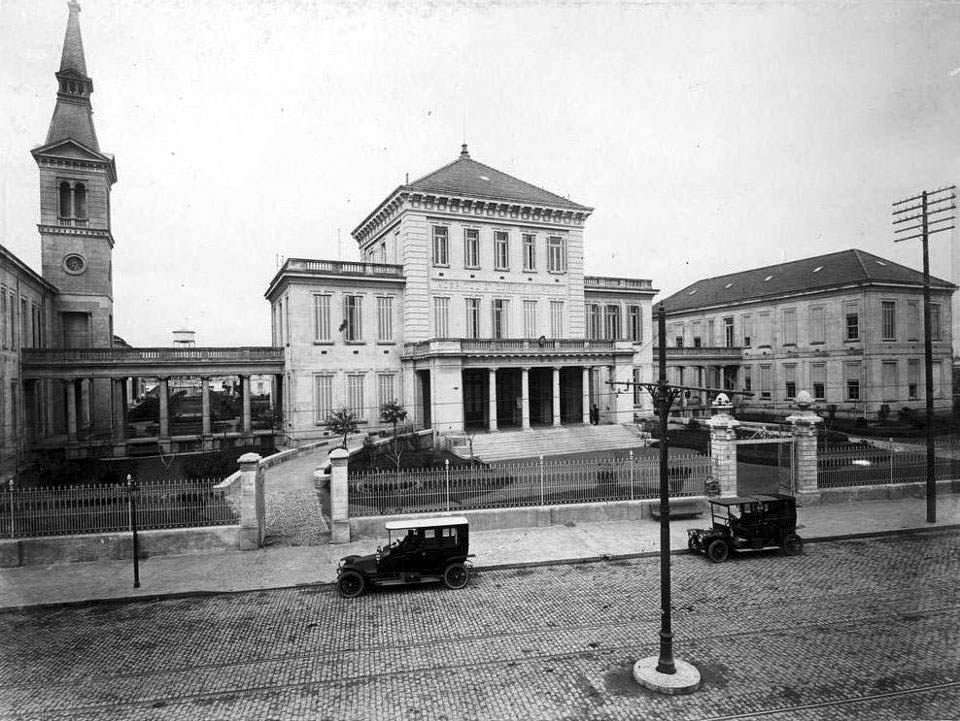
Durand Hospital (c.1920)

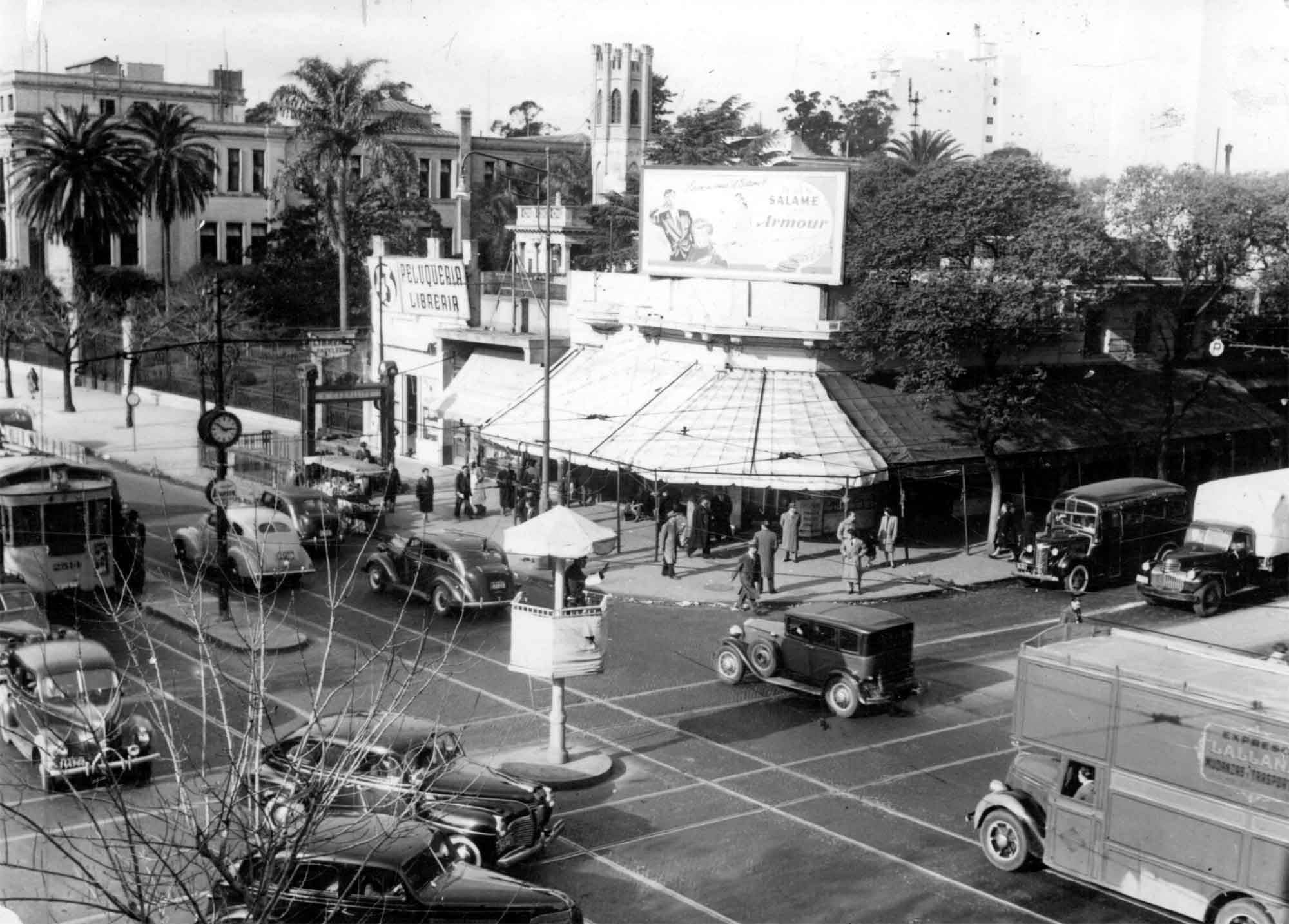
Intersection of Rivadavia and Jose Maria Moreno (1947)

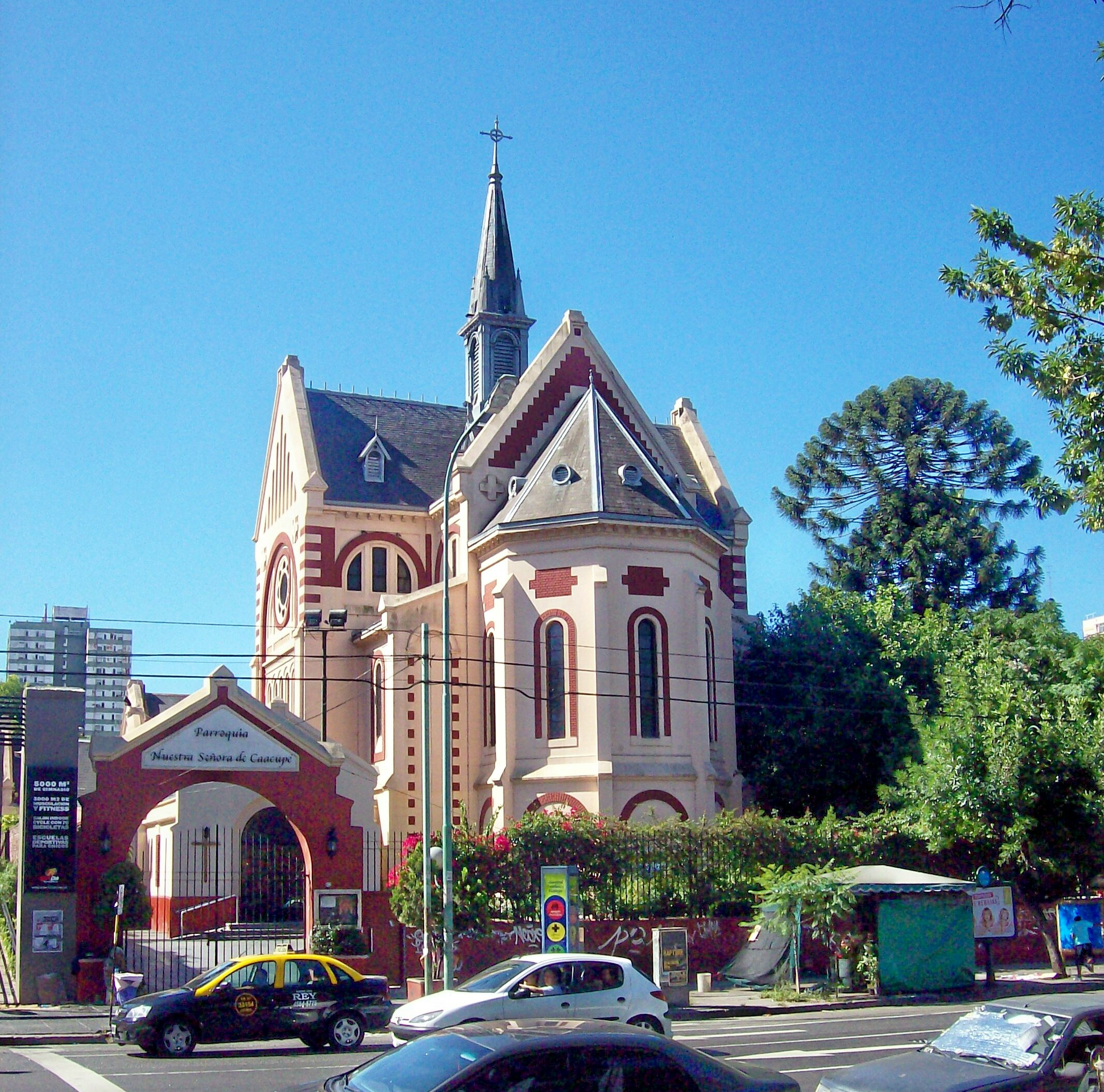
Nuestra Señora de Caacupé church

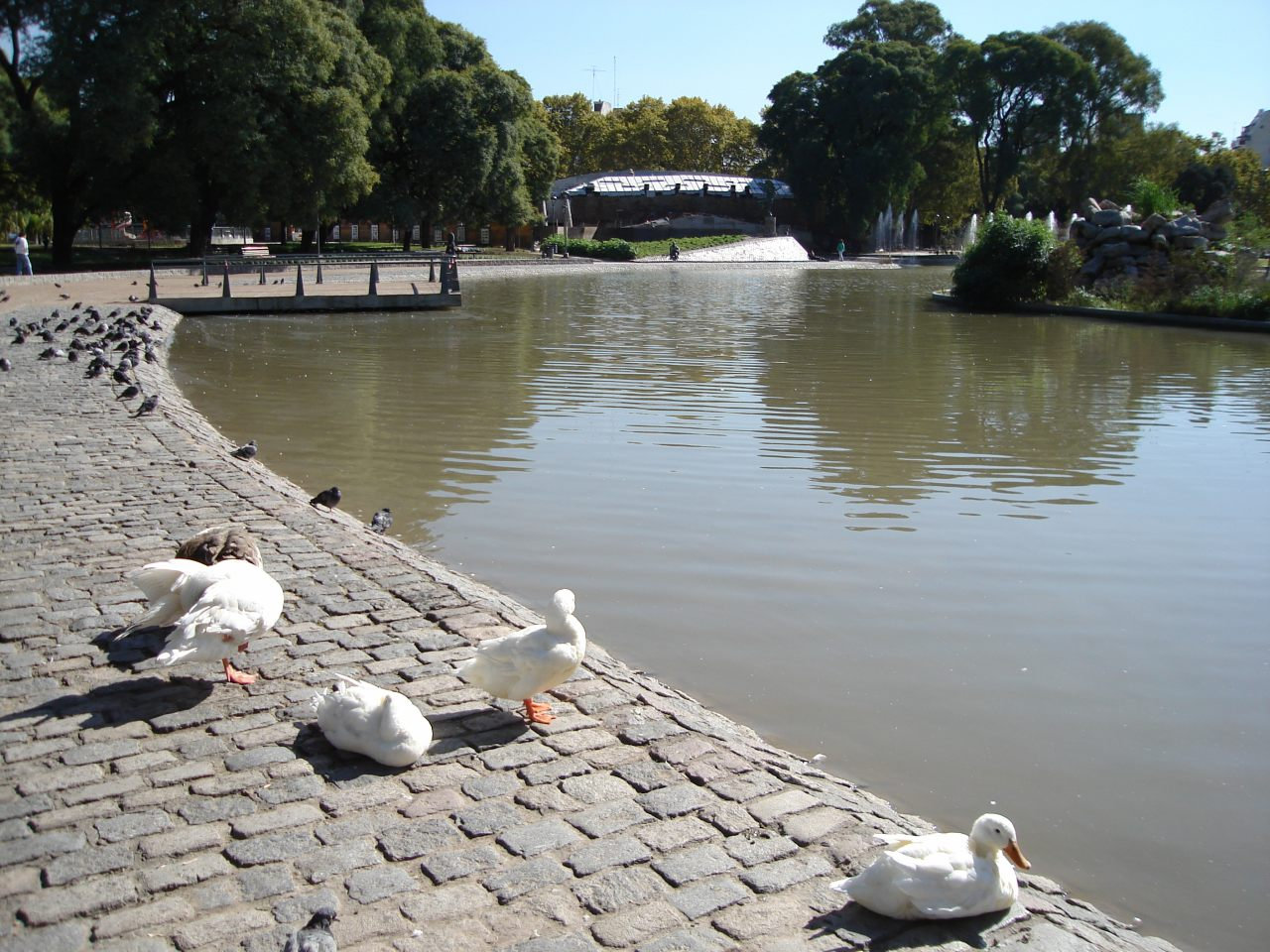
Regulars at the Parque Centenario lake

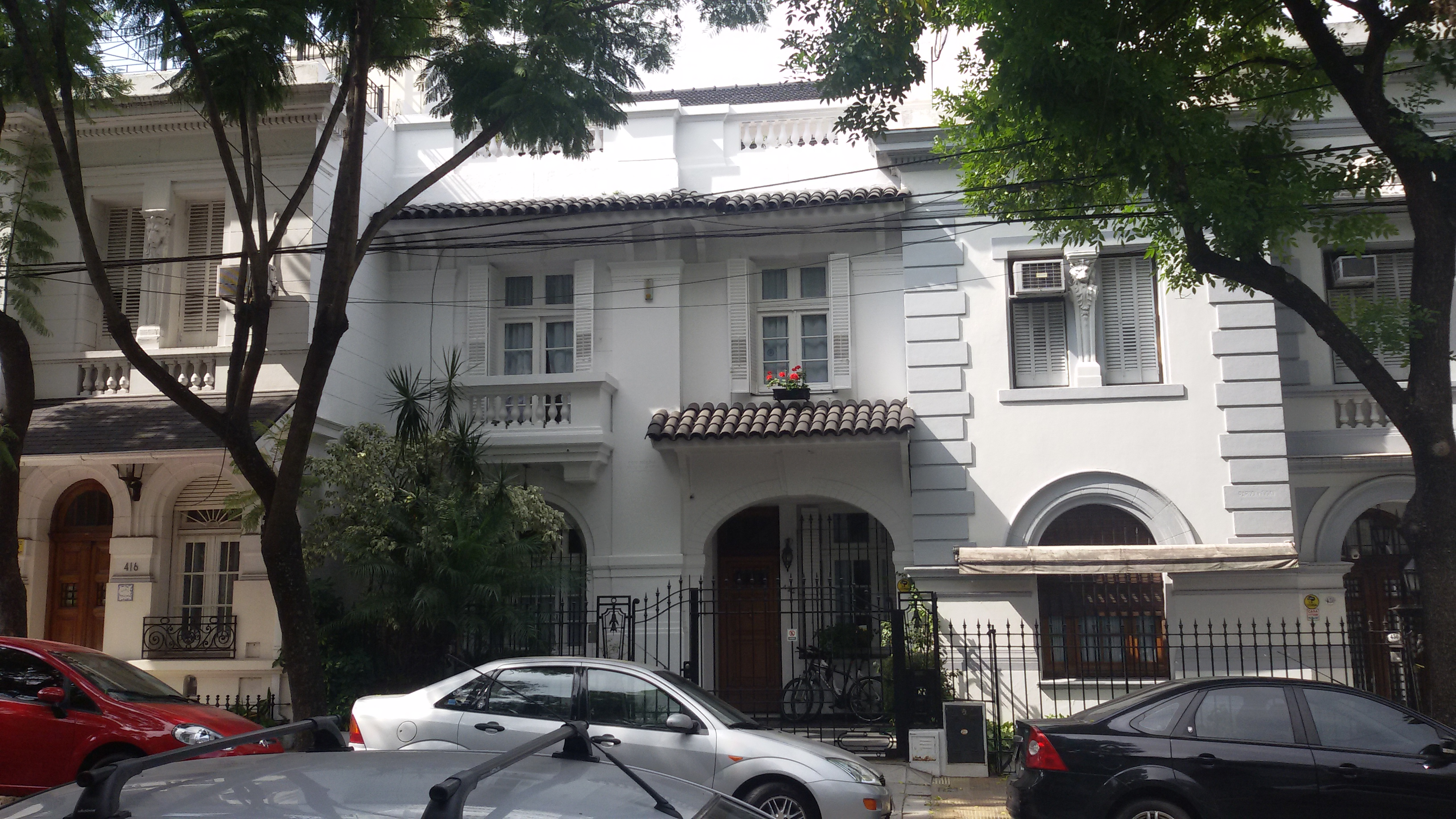
Residential area of Caballito

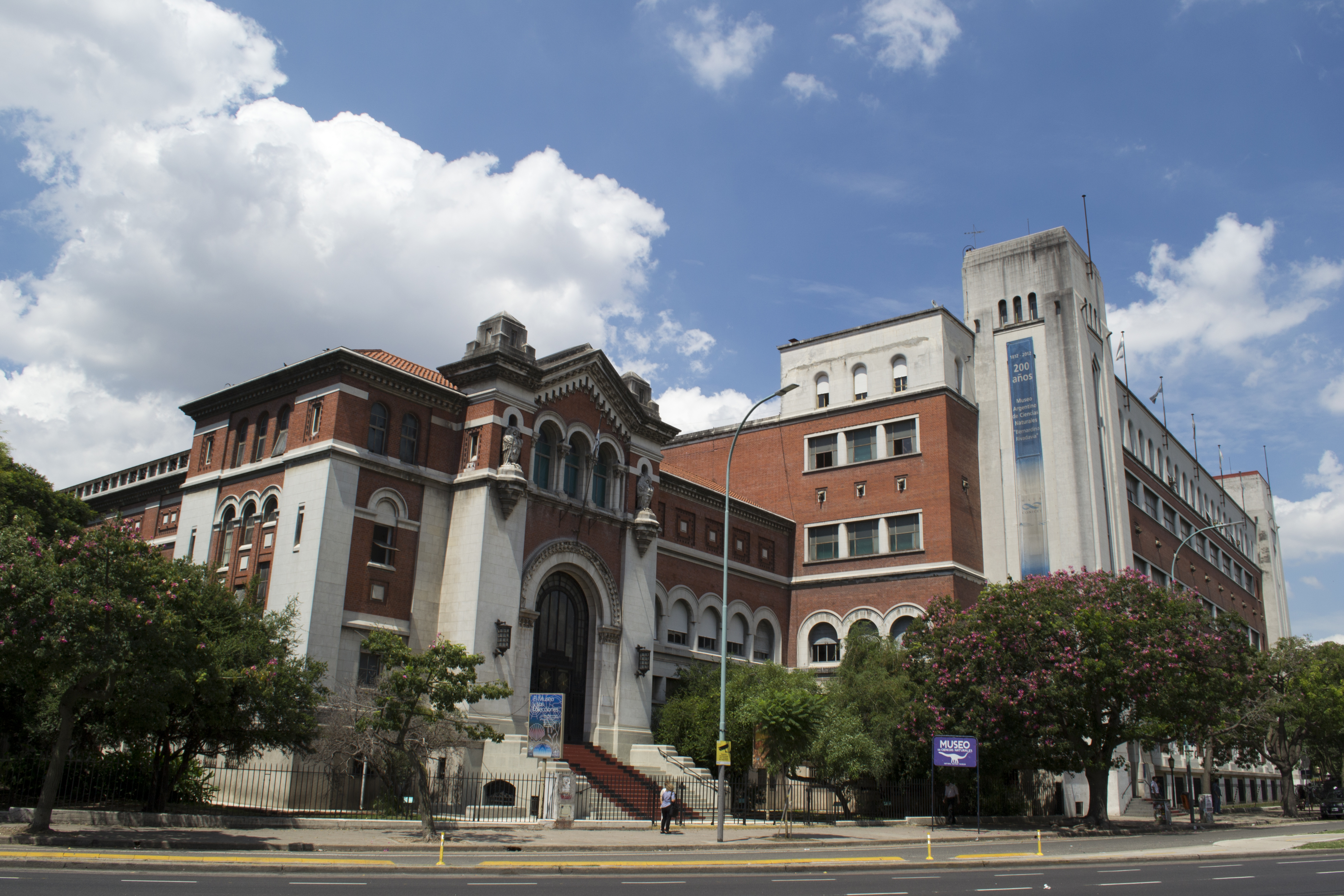
Bernardino Rivadavia Natural Sciences Museum
