= Parque Centenario =

Argentine public park in Caballito, Buenos Aires

Coordinates: 34°36′23″S 58°26′08″W

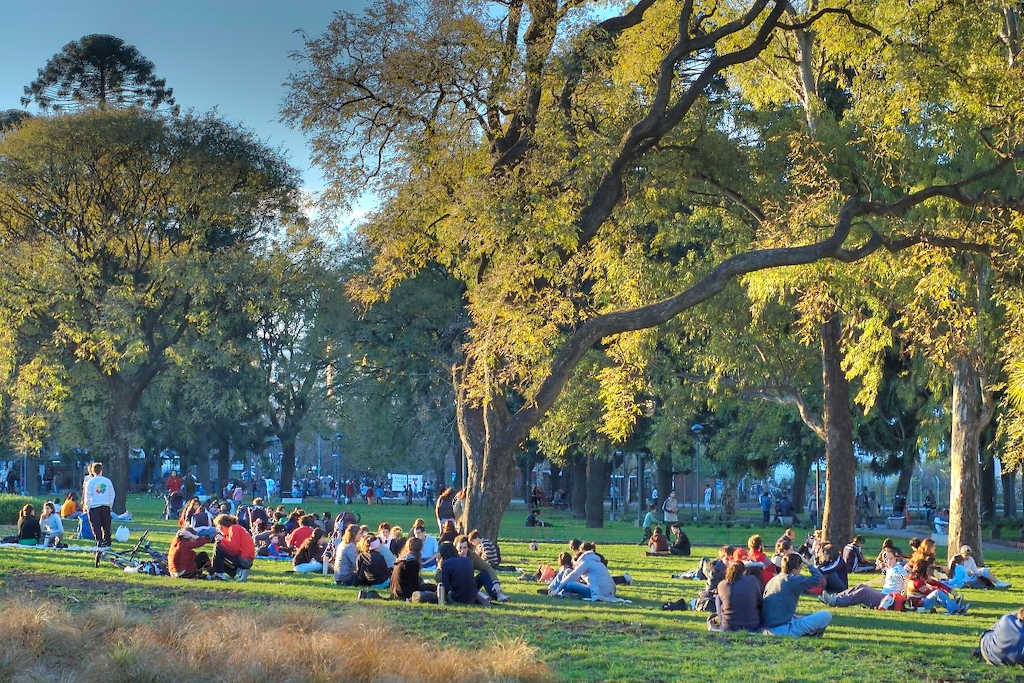
Visitors relax under Buenos Aires' characteristic tipa trees.

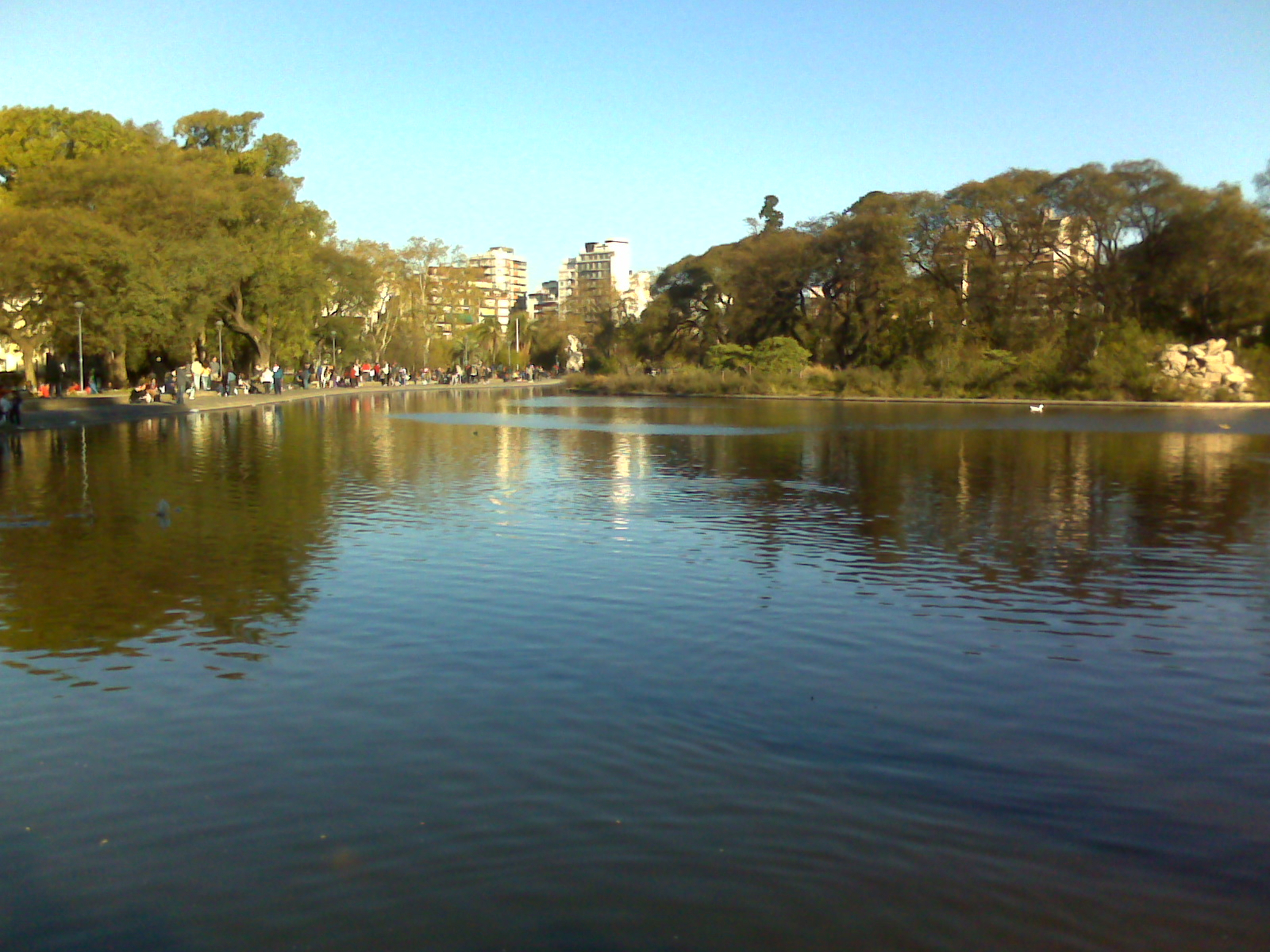
The swan lake.

Parque Centenario is an extensive public park in the Caballito district of Buenos Aires, Argentina.

== Overview ==
Presiding over a rapidly expanding city, the Buenos Aires City Council in 1908 approved the purchase of a 10 hectare (25 acre) plot belonging to Parmenio Piñero, a local brickmaker, for the purpose of a creating a "Westside Park" (the area was near Buenos Aires' western limits at the time). The project was entrusted to the City Parks Administrator, the renowned French Argentine urbanist Charles Thays, who completed the project in time for the 1910 centennial of the May Revolution (hence the park's name, Centenario). Rerouting two streets, Thays created a circular green space anchored by fountain in the middle. The outer sections of the park were planned for residential development, though these plans were later rescinded.

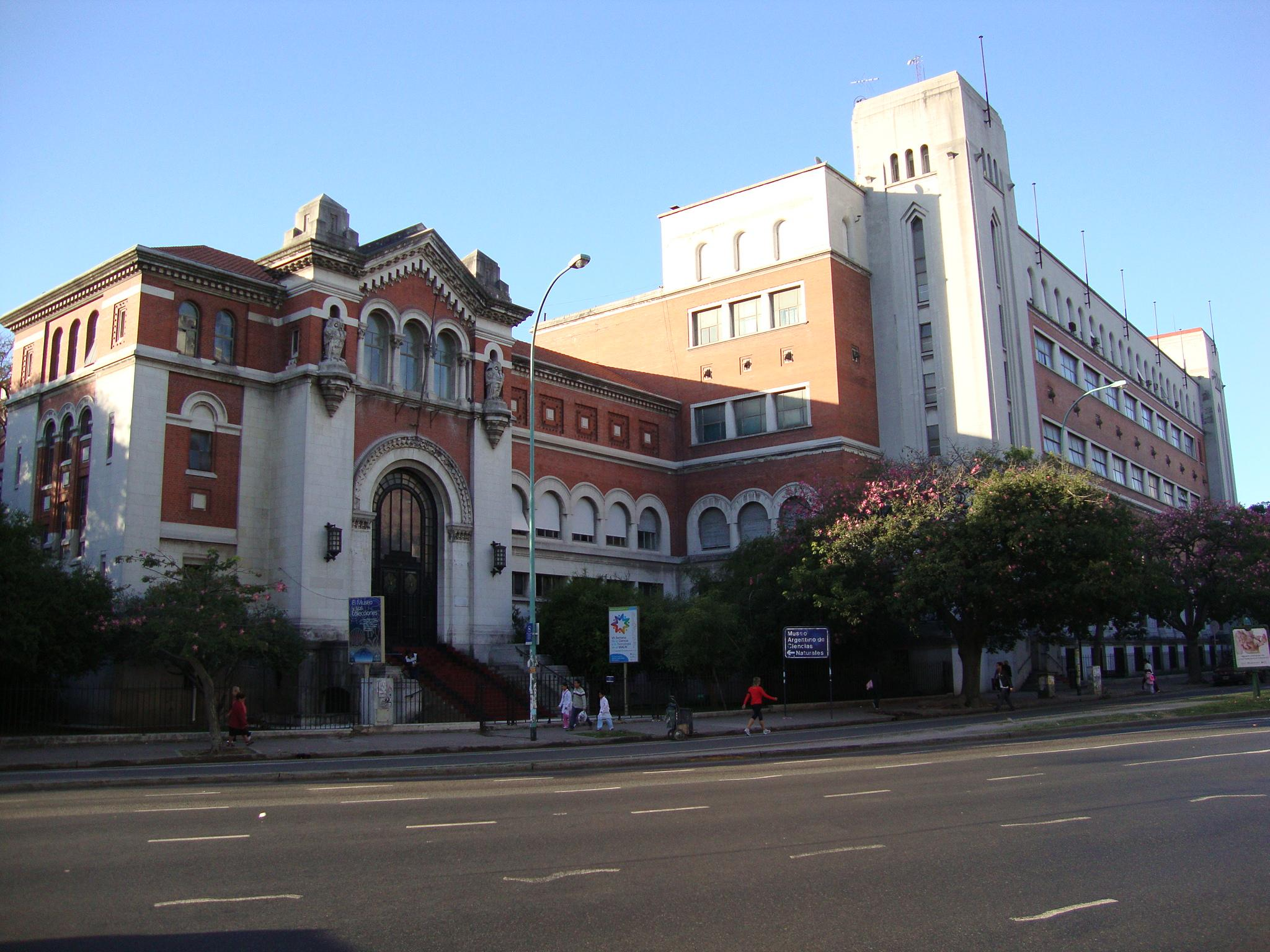
The Museum of Natural Sciences.

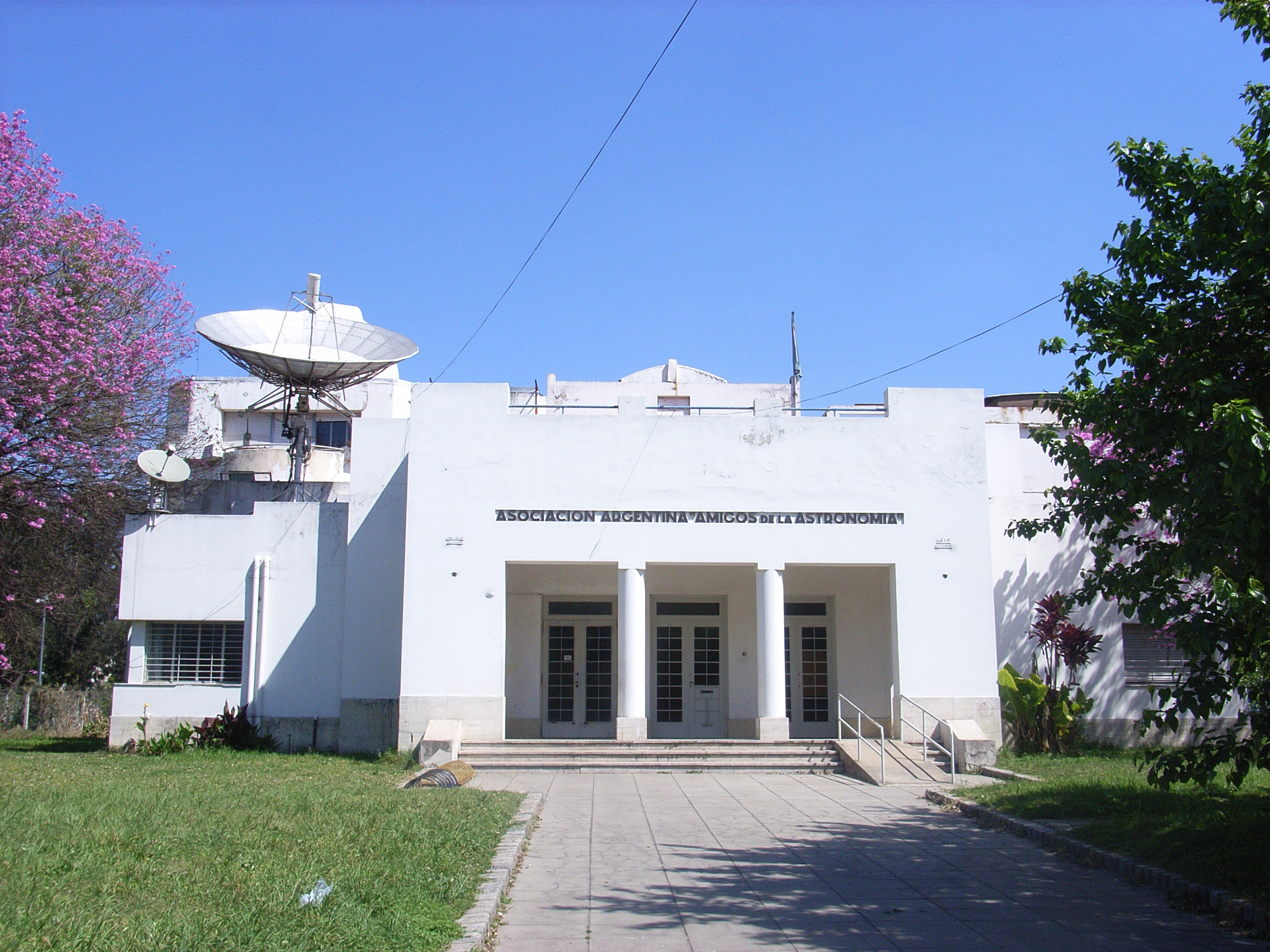
The Friends of Astronomy observatory.

The outermost lots were made available to a number of cultural and scientific institutions, notably the Louis Pasteur Institute (founded in 1927), the Marie Curie Oncological Institute (1931), the Bernardino Rivadavia Natural Sciences Museum, which relocated there from its original building in 1937, and the Argentine Friends of Astronomy Association, who opened their observatory at the park in 1944; the Leloir Institute - one of the nation's leading biotechnology research centers - and the Central Naval Hospital were both opened during the early 1980s in lots facing the park. President Juan Perón had the central fountain replaced in 1951 by an amphitheatre with a capacity for 20,000 spectators, a structure lost to arson in 1959. Mayor Osvaldo Cacciatore had a shallow lake built over 2000 m^{2} (21,000 ft²) of the central section of the park during the late 1970s, later populated with ducks, swans and other waterfowl. The mile-long perimeter became a popular joggers' route and a number of important public institutions had been opened along the park's surroundings.

Parque Centenario increasingly suffered from neglect during the 1980s, a trend underscored by the 1989 theft of the iconic bronze female nude in sculptor Luis Perlotti's Fountain of the Irupé Flower. Mayor Aníbal Ibarra initiated an ambitious restoration project for the park in 2005, resulting in the reconstruction of the amphitheatre, the refurbishment of the swan lake and the creation of a number of new facilities. The park's refurbishment was concluded in May 2009, and the new, 2,000 seat amphitheatre was inaugurated with a performance by the City Tango Orchestra. Mayor Mauricio Macri's decision to install a perimeter fence around the park in 2013, however, resulted in a violent protest by opponents of the plan.
