= 2015 Buenos Aires City elections =

- Mayoral election
← 2011	5 July 2015 (first round); 19 July 2015 (second round)	2019 →
- Turnout: 73.04% (first round); 69.38% (second round)
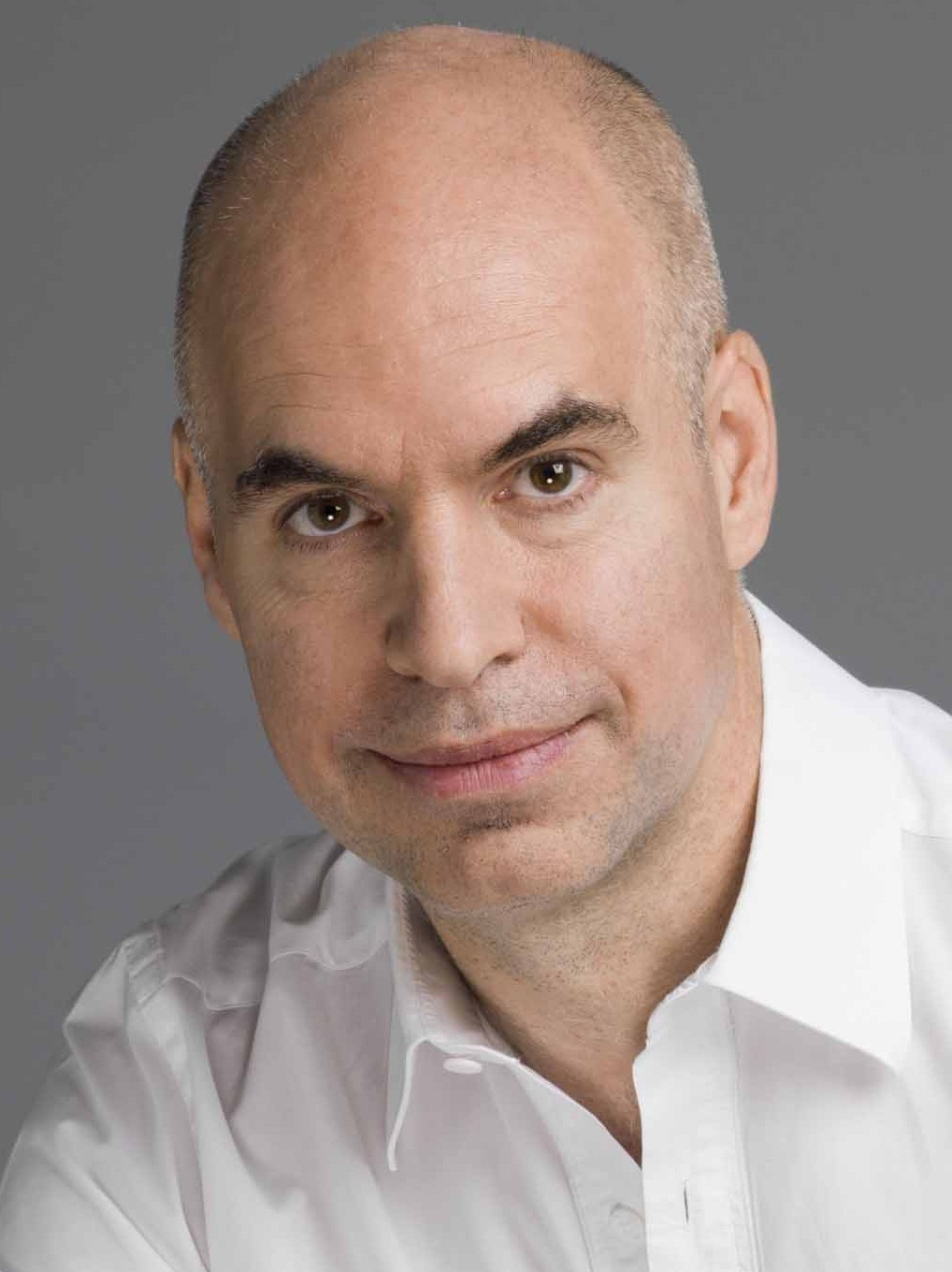

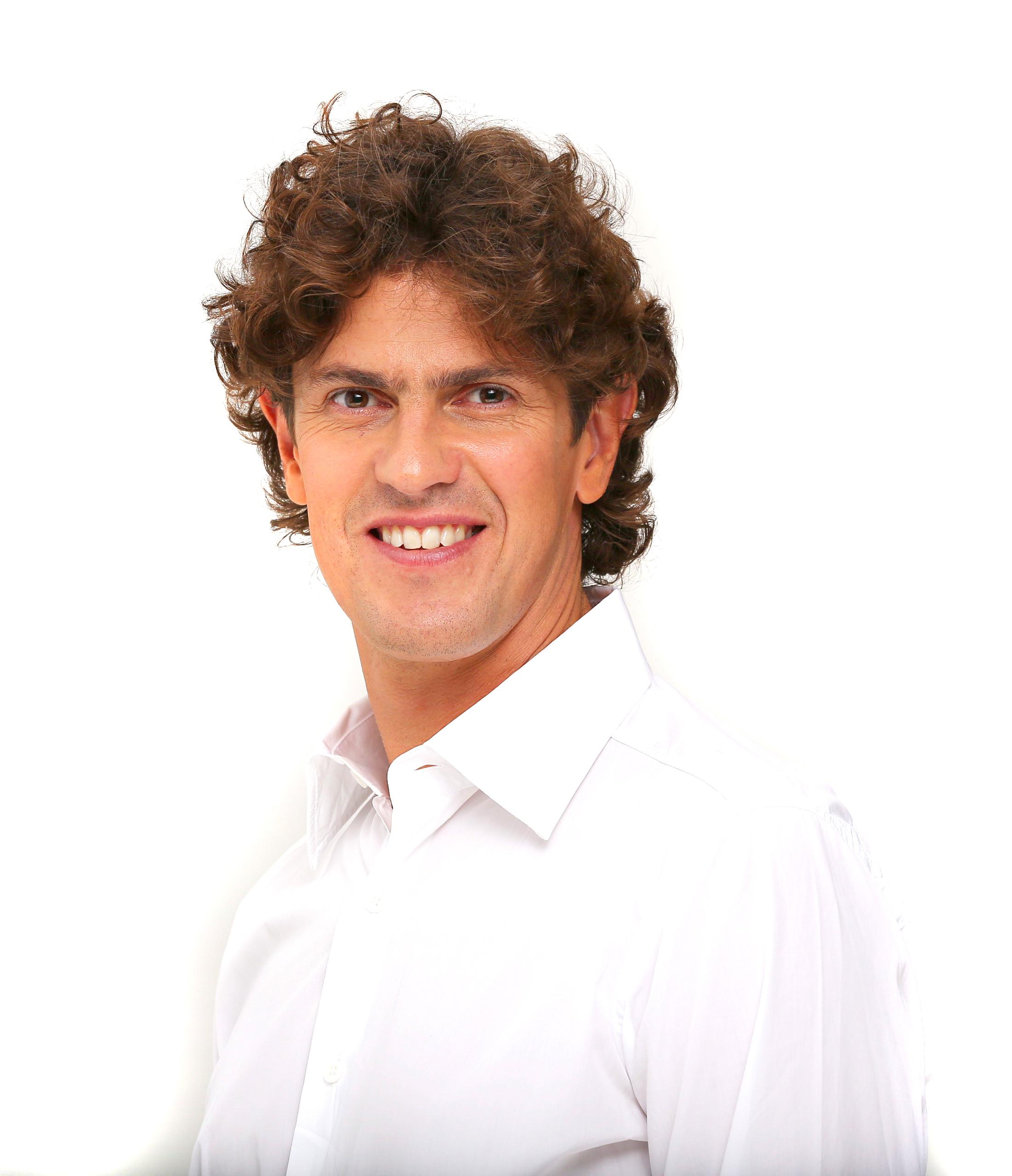
Nominee	Horacio Rodríguez Larreta	Martín Lousteau
Party	PRO	Independent
Alliance	PRO Union	ECO
Running mate	Diego Santilli	Fernando Sánchez
Popular vote	861,380	806,525
Percentage	51.64%	48.36%
Chief of Government before election
Mauricio Macri
PRO
Elected Chief of Government
Horacio Rodríguez Larreta
PRO
- City Legislature
← 2013	5 July 2015	2017 →
- 30 out of 60 seats in the City Legislature
- Turnout: 79.78%
Party	Leader	Vote %	Seats	+/–
PRO	Mauricio Macri	44.48	15	+3
ECO	Martín Lousteau	23.51	7	−3
FPV-PJ	Mariano Recalde	17.18	6	−1
FIT – Unidad	Myriam Bregman	4.83	1	0
AyL	Luis Zamora	3.96	1	+1
This lists parties that won seats. See the complete results below.

General elections were held in the City of Buenos Aires on 5 July 2015 to elect the Chief of Government (mayor), half of the City Legislature and all 150 members of the communal boards to four-year terms. As no mayoral candidate won a majority in the first round, a runoff was held on 19 July, in which Horacio Rodríguez Larreta, of the governing Republican Proposal (PRO) party, defeated Martín Lousteau and his Organized Citizen Energy (ECO) coalition to become Chief of Government of Buenos Aires.

Incumbent Chief of Government Mauricio Macri was term-limited, and instead ran a successful presidential campaign in October 2015. The City Legislature remained controlled by the governing Republican Proposal (PRO) party and its coalition, PRO Union.

This was the first election in which the Single Electronic Ballot (Boleta Única Electrónica, BUE) voting system was implemented.

== Background ==
The 2011 elections in Buenos Aires had resulted in the re-election of incumbent Chief of Government Mauricio Macri in the second round against FPV candidate Daniel Filmus. Macri's party, Republican Proposal (PRO), also remained the largest force in the City Legislature.

The electoral laws of the City of Buenos Aires determined the local elections could not be held concurrently with the nationwide general election being held the same year. The election was thus set for 5 July 2015, with primaries being held on 26 April 2015.

This was the first election in which the Single Electronic Ballot (Boleta Única Electrónica, BUE) voting system was implemented. The use of the new electronic system was subject to controversy and criticism from opposition figures, such as leading candidate Martín Lousteau, who claimed the system was not secure and transparent enough.

== Candidates ==
Coalition	Mayoral candidate (party) Prior political experience	Vice mayoral candidate (party) Prior political experience	Parties
	Horacio Rodríguez Larreta (PRO); Cabinet Chief (2007–2015)	Diego Santilli (PRO); National Senator (2013–2015)	PRO; PDP; PD; FE; UCEDE; MID; UPL; PAC
	Martín Lousteau (Ind.); Minister of Economy of Argentina (2007–2008)	Fernando Sánchez (CC-ARI); National Deputy (2013–2017)	UCR; CC-ARI; PS; CF; PSA
	Mariano Recalde (PJ); President of Aerolíneas Argentinas (2009–2015)	Leandro Santoro (UCR)	PJ; FR; FPG; FG; PV; ND; Kolina; PI; CF; NE; PSOL; FORJA; PF; PC; PTP; RxBA; ParTE
	Luis Zamora; National Deputy (2001–2005)	Sergio Sallustio	AyL
	Myriam Bregman; National Deputy (2015–2016)	José Castillo	PO; PTS; IS

== Results ==
=== Primaries ===
==== Mayoral primaries ====
Coalition	List	Mayoral candidate	Candidate votes		Overall votes	
Coalition	List	Mayoral candidate	Votes	%	Votes	%
PRO Union	Sigamos con el Cambio	Horacio Rodríguez Larreta	529,452		882,421	47,98
PRO Union	Hay Equipo	Gabriela Michetti	352,969		882,421	47,98
Organized Citizen Energy	Suma+	Martín Lousteau	332,225		413,465	22.48
Organized Citizen Energy	Transparencia y Gestión	Graciela Ocaña	76,873		413,465	22.48
Organized Citizen Energy	Abrimos BA	Andrés Borthagaray	4,367		413,465	22.48
Front for Victory	Podemos vivir mejor	Mariano Recalde	228,900		348,282	18.94
Front for Victory	La Ciudad es el Otro	Gabriela Cerruti	40,598		348,282	18.94
Front for Victory	Frente Sí	Aníbal Ibarra	37,930		348,282	18.94
Front for Victory	Unidos por la Ciudad	Carlos Heller	26,881		348,282	18.94
Front for Victory	Ciudad para Todos	Gustavo Fernando López	7,905		348,282	18.94
Front for Victory	Revolución Urbana	Víctor Ramos	3,380		348,282	18.94
Front for Victory	Espacio Abierto Aluvión	Carlos Oviedo	2,688		348,282	18.94
Worker's Left Front	Lista Unidad	Myriam Bregman	41,719	2.24	41,719	2.24
Self-determination and Freedom	Caminamos Preguntando	Luis Zamora	37,885	2.06	37,885	2.06
People's Way Alliance	Otro Camino para Gobernar	Claudio Lozano	26,810	1.44	26,810	1.44
Front for Buenos Aires	Frente Renovador	Guillermo Nielsen	16,742	0.91	16,742	0.91
MST - New Left	Lista 1	Héctor Bidonde	7,104		16,470	0.89
MST - New Left	Lista 2	Maru Lopes	3,402		16,470	0.89
MST - New Left	Lista 3	Martín Torres	3,226		16,470	0.89
MST - New Left	Lista 4	Sergio García	2,738		16,470	0.89
Movement for the Common Good	Lista A	Gustavo Vera	11,917		14,585	0.78
Movement for the Common Good	Lista B	Leonardo Fabre	2,668		14,585	0.78
It's Possible Party	Compromiso Federal	Ivo Cutzarida	10,811	0.58	10,811	0.58
SURGEN	Ciudad Justa	Sergio Abrevaya	4,296		8,231	0,44
SURGEN	Vientos de Cambio	Humberto Tumini	3,935		8,231	0,44
Alternative Buenos Aires	Lista A	Pablo Ferreyra	7,576	0.41	7,576	0.41
Movement for Socialism	Unidad de la Izquierda	Manuela Castañeira	5,896	0.32	5,896	0.32
Humanist Party	Lista Única	Gustavo Tenaglia	4,185	0.23	4,185	0.23
Neighborhood Flag	Lista Común	Ramiro Vasena	2,486	0.13	2,486	0.13
Federal Movement	Lista Celeste y Blanca	Enrique Piragini	1,642	0.09	1,642	0.09
Valid votes					1,829,526	100
Blank votes					20,533	1.09
Invalid votes					20,397	1.08
Total					1,880,136	97.82
Registered voters/turnout					2,555,967	73.56

=== Chief of Government ===
Candidate	Running mate	Party	First round		Second round	
Candidate	Running mate	Party	Votes	%	Votes	%
Horacio Rodríguez Larreta	Diego Santilli	PRO Union	832,619	45.56	861,380	51.64
Martín Lousteau	Fernando Sánchez	Organized Citizen Energy	465,583	25.48	806,525	48.36
Mariano Recalde	Leandro Santoro	Front for Victory	400,522	21.92		
Luis Zamora	Sergio Sallustio	Self-determination and Freedom	72,149	3.95		
Myriam Bregman	José Castillo	Workers' Left Front	56,617	3.10		
Total			1,827,490	100.00	1,667,905	100.00
Valid votes			1,827,490	97.90	1,667,905	94.05
Invalid votes			4,627	0.25	15,567	0.88
Blank votes			34,628	1.85	89,927	5.07
Total votes			1,866,745	100.00	1,773,399	100.00
Registered voters/turnout			2,555,967	73.03	2,555,967	69.38

=== Legislature ===
Distribution of seats in the City Legislature following the 2015 election: PRO Union (28) Organized Citizen Energy (14) Front for Victory (13) Workers' Left Front (2) Self-determination and Freedom (1) Renewal Front (1) Movement for the Common Good (1)

Party	Votes	%	Seats
PRO Union	816,129	44.48	15
Organized Citizen Energy	431,324	23.51	7
Front for Victory	380,806	20.76	6
Workers' Left Front	88,686	4.83	1
Self-determination and Freedom	72,698	3.96	1
People's Way Alliance	45,075	2.46	0
Total	1,834,718	100.00	30
Valid votes	1,834,718	98.27	
Invalid votes	4,630	0.25	
Blank votes	27,597	1.48	
Total votes	1,866,945	100.00	
Registered voters/turnout	2,555,967	73.04	

== See also ==
- 2015 Argentine general election
- 2015 Argentine provincial elections
- List of mayors and chiefs of government of Buenos Aires City
