= 2011 Buenos Aires City elections =

- Mayoral election
← 2007	10 July 2011 (first round); 31 July 2011 (second round)	2015 →
- Turnout: 73.15% (first round); 72.02 % (second round)
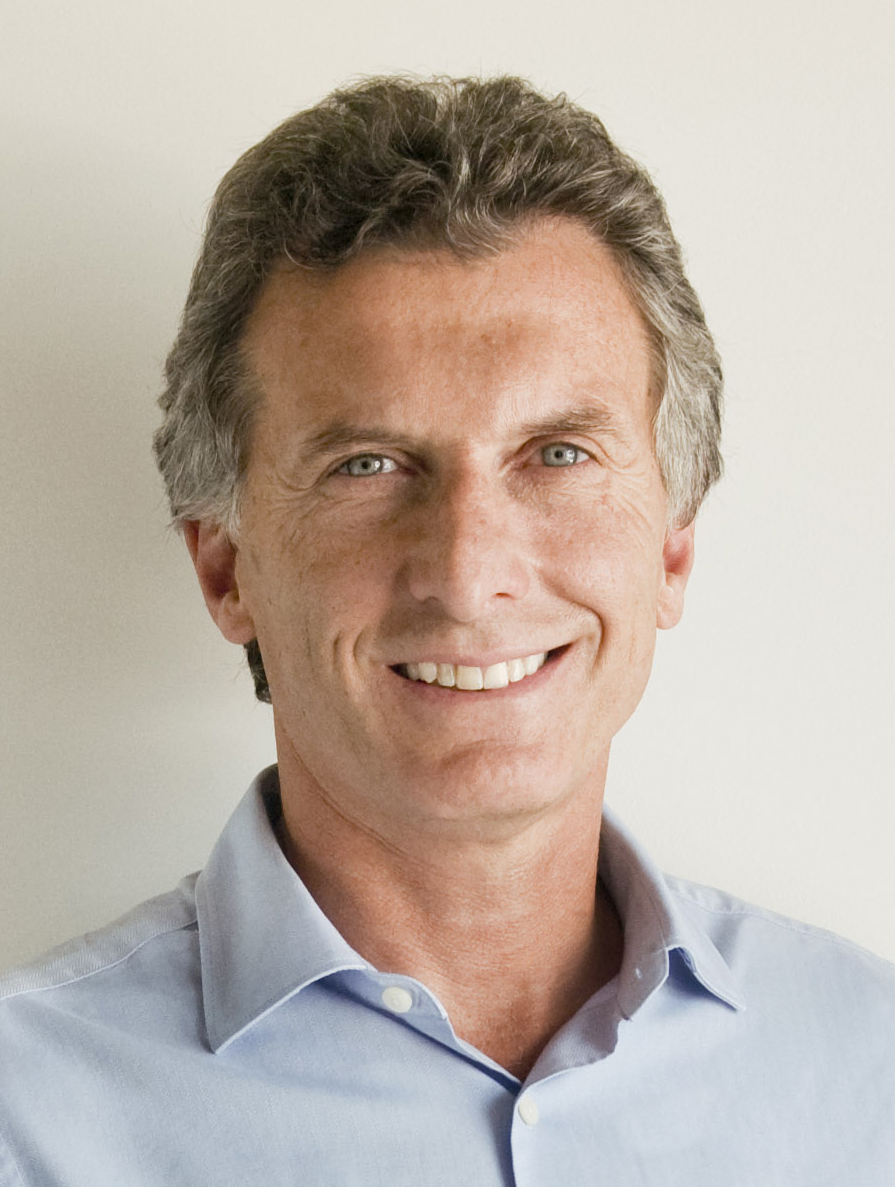

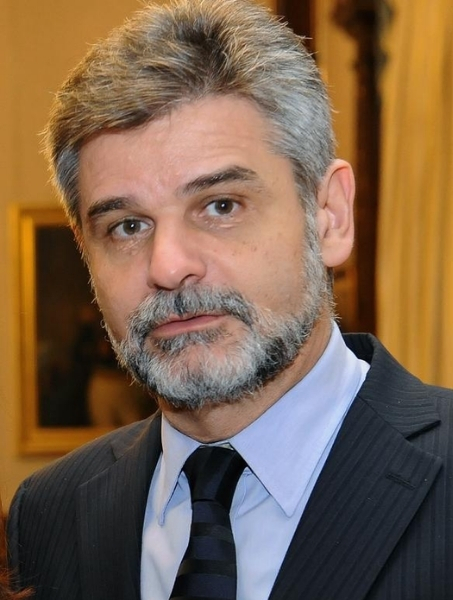
Nominee	Mauricio Macri	Daniel Filmus
Party	PRO	PJ
Alliance	PRO Alliance	Front for Victory
Running mate	María Eugenia Vidal	Carlos Tomada
Popular vote	1,090,389	606,126
Percentage	64.27%	35.73%
- Second round results by commune
Chief of Government before election
Mauricio Macri
PRO
Elected Chief of Government
Mauricio Macri
PRO
- City Legislature
← 2009	10 July 2011	2013 →
- 30 out of 60 seats in the City Legislature
- Turnout: 73.15%
Party	Leader	Vote %	Seats	+/–
PRO	Mauricio Macri	44.95	16	+5
FPV-PJ	Daniel Filmus	14.02	5	+1
Proyecto Sur	Pino Solanas	12.90	4	−4
Frente Progresista y Popular	Aníbal Ibarra	6.71	2	+1
New Encounter	Martín Sabbatella	6.51	2	+2
Civic Coalition	María Eugenia Estenssoro	3.95	1	+1
This lists parties that won seats. See the complete results below.

General elections were held in the City of Buenos Aires on 10 July 2011 to elect the Chief of Government (mayor), half of the City Legislature and all 150 members of the communal boards to four-year terms. As no mayoral candidate won a majority in the first round, a runoff was held on 31 July 2011, in which incumbent Mauricio Macri, of the Republican Proposal (PRO) party, defeated Daniel Filmus of the Front for Victory (FPV) coalition to be re-elected as Chief of Government of Buenos Aires.

The City Legislature remained controlled by the governing PRO Alliance.

This was the first election in which members of the communal boards were elected, as the actual borders of the communes (comunas) had only been established in 2008 following the adoption of Law 1777, which created the commune subdivision system.

== Background ==
The 2007 elections in Buenos Aires resulted in the election of businessman and former Boca Juniors president Mauricio Macri in the second round against FPV candidate Daniel Filmus. Macri's party, Commitment to Change, and its alliance, Republican Proposal (PRO), also became the largest force in the City Legislature.

== Candidates ==
Coalition	Mayoral candidate (party) Prior political experience	Vice mayoral candidate (party) Prior political experience	Parties
	Mauricio Macri (PRO); Chief of Government (2007–2015)	María Eugenia Vidal (PRO); Minister of Social Development (2008–2011)	PRO; PD; PDP
	Daniel Filmus (PJ); National Senator (2007–2013)	Carlos Tomada (PJ); Minister of Labour (2003–2015)	PJ; PV; FG; PI; NE; ND; Kolina; PH; PC; FPyP; RxBA
	Pino Solanas (PSUR); National Deputy (2009–2013; 1993–1997)	Jorge Selser (PSA); City Legislator (2009–2013)	PSUR; PS; PSA; GEN; LDS; NI; BAPT
	Eugenia Estenssoro (ARI); National Senator (2008–2013)	Fernando Sánchez (ARI); City Legislator (2009–2013)	ARI; UPT; PPES
	Silvana Giudici (UCR); National Deputy (2003–2011)	Claudio Augugliaro Acierno (UCR)	UCR; PF; UNIR; PCEA; EM
	Jorge Telerman (PJ); Chief of Government (2006–2007)	Diego Kravetz (PJ); City Legislator (2003–2011)	FPxBA
	Luis Zamora; National Deputy (2001–2005)	Sergio Sallustio	AyL
	Ricardo López Murphy; Minister of Economy (2001)	Ana Luisa Paulesu	PA
	Myriam Bregman (PTS)	José Castillo (IS)	PO; PTS; IS

== Results ==
=== Chief of Government ===
Candidate	Running mate	Party	First round		Second round	
Candidate	Running mate	Party	Votes	%	Votes	%
Mauricio Macri	María Eugenia Vidal	PRO Alliance	836,608	47.07	1,090,389	64.27
Daniel Filmus	Carlos Tomada	Front for Victory	495,339	27.87	606,126	35.73
Pino Solanas	Jorge Selser	Proyecto Sur	227,863	12.82		
María Eugenia Estenssoro	Fernando Sánchez	Civic Coalition	58,817	3.31		
Silvana Giudici	Claudio Augugliaro Acierno	Radical Civic Union	36,203	2.04		
Jorge Telerman	Diego Kravetz	Progressive Front for Buenos Aires	31,326	1.76		
Luis Zamora	Cecilia Paul	Self-determination and Freedom	26,067	1.47		
Ricardo López Murphy	Ana Luisa Paulesu	Autonomist Party	24,911	1.40		
Javier Castrilli	Leda Iruzun Di Si	Civic Action Party	13,827	0.78		
Myriam Bregman	José Castillo	Workers' Left Front	13,804	0.78		
Jorge Todesca	Lisandro Yofré	Integration and Development Movement	5,059	0.28		
Alejandro Biondini	Mario Puértolas	Social Alternative	3,314	0.19		
César Rojas	Rubén Saboulard	Socialist Advance Movement	2,553	0.14		
Enrique Piragini	José Luis Ferrari	Citizens' Front	1,728	0.10		
Total			1,777,419	100.00	1,696,515	100.00
Valid votes			1,777,419	97.70	1,696,515	94.72
Invalid votes			15,322	0.84	50,635	2.83
Blank votes			26,497	1.46	44,028	2.46
Total votes			1,819,238	100.00	1,791,178	100.00
Registered voters/turnout			2,486,991	73.15	2,486,991	72.02

=== Legislature ===
Party	Votes	%	Seats	
Party	Votes	%	Won	Total
Republican Proposal Alliance	792,519	44.95	16	27
Front for Victory	247,140	14.02	5	9
Proyecto Sur	227,430	12.90	4	12
People's Progressive Front	118,345	6.71	2	3
New Encounter	114,693	6.51	2	2
Civic Coalition	69,623	3.95	1	5
Radical Civic Union	36,887	2.09	0	2
Progressive Front for Buenos Aires	33,164	1.88	0	0
Self-determination and Freedom	26,843	1.52	0	0
Autonomist Party	23,631	1.34	0	0
Values for My Country	18,584	1.05	0	0
Workers' Left Front	17,838	1.01	0	0
Civic Action Party	13,340	0.76	0	0
Together for the City	6,534	0.37	0	0
Integration and Development Movement	5,482	0.31	0	0
Social Alternative	3,495	0.20	0	0
Socialist Advance Movement	2,838	0.16	0	0
Party for Culture and Social Development	2,724	0.15	0	0
Citizens' Front	2,005	0.11	0	0
Total	1,763,115	100.00	30	60
Valid votes	1,763,115	96.92		
Invalid votes	15,229	0.84		
Blank votes	40,894	2.25		
Total votes	1,819,238	100.00		
Registered voters/turnout	2,486,991	73.15		

== See also ==
- 2011 Argentine general election
- 2011 Argentine provincial elections
- List of mayors and chiefs of government of Buenos Aires
