= María Eugenia Vidal =

Argentine politician

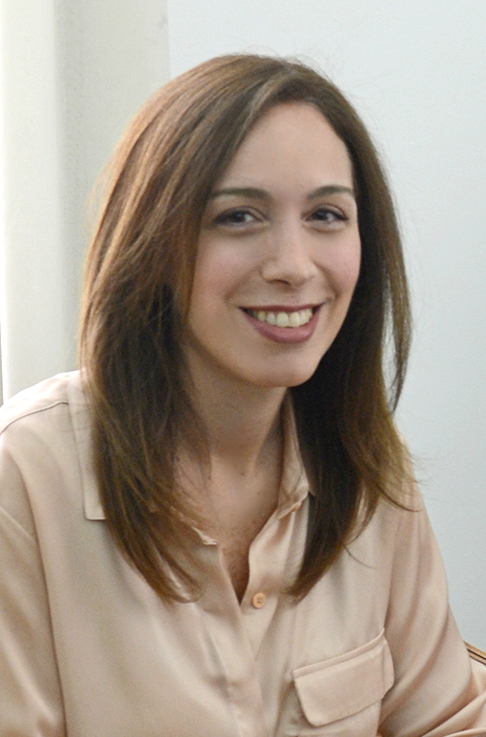

National Deputy
- In office 10 December 2021 – 10 December 2025
- Constituency: City of Buenos Aires

Governor of Buenos Aires Province
- In office 10 December 2015 – 10 December 2019
- Vice Governor: Daniel Salvador
- Preceded by: Daniel Scioli
- Succeeded by: Axel Kicillof

Deputy Chief of Government of Buenos Aires
- In office 10 December 2011 – 10 December 2015
- Government Chief: Mauricio Macri
- Preceded by: Gabriela Michetti
- Succeeded by: Diego Santilli

Minister of Social Development of the City of Buenos Aires
- In office 28 May 2008 – 10 December 2011
- Government Chief: Mauricio Macri
- Preceded by: Esteban Bullrich
- Succeeded by: Carolina Stanley

Personal details
- Born: 8 September 1973 (age 53) Buenos Aires, Argentina
- Party: Republican Proposal
- Other political affiliations: Cambiemos
- Spouse: Ramiro Tagliaferro (1998-2016)
- Children: 3
- Education: Pontifical Catholic University of Argentina

María Eugenia Vidal (born 8 September 1973) is an Argentine politician who served as Governor of the Buenos Aires Province, being the first woman in the office, and the first non-Peronist since 1987. A member of Republican Proposal (PRO), she previously served as Social Development minister of the City of Buenos Aires, and in 2011 she was elected deputy mayor of the city under Mauricio Macri. From 2021 to 2025, she has been a National Deputy for the Juntos por el Cambio coalition.

During her time as governor, Vidal was called "the Argentine Margaret Thatcher" due to her tough position against Peronist-aligned teacher unions.

She was not reelected as a national representative in 2025, and will finish her current term in December.

== Background ==
Vidal was born in Buenos Aires. She was raised in the Flores ward and enrolled in the Pontifical Catholic University of Argentina, earning a degree in political science. She met Ramiro Tagliaferro, a classmate at the university, and they married in 1998; the couple has a son and two daughters.

She began her career in Grupo Sophia, a think tank founded by Horacio Rodríguez Larreta. She was named director of the group's social policy desk in 2000, as well as of Fundación Creer y Crecer, a think tank organized by Commitment to Change, a conservative political party led by mayoral candidate Mauricio Macri. She is also a member of Washington D.C.–based think tank, The Inter-American Dialogue. Vidal was elected to the Buenos Aires City Legislature in 2003, and was appointed Chair of the Committee on Women and Youth. She served in the Human Resources Department at PAMI (the national health insurance service for the elderly and disabled), and as adviser to ANSES (the social security administration), as well as the nation's Ministries of Social Development and Foreign Relations.

Vidal was fielded in the Republican Proposal (PRO) party list as a candidate for a seat in the Argentine Chamber of Deputies for Buenos Aires Province in 2005, though unsuccessfully; she was later elected to the Buenos Aires City Legislature. The election of PRO leader Mauricio Macri as Mayor of Buenos Aires in 2007 led to Vidal's nomination as the city's Minister of Social Development. She requested maternity leave from the post ahead of her scheduled December 10 swearing-in for the birth of her third child, and took office on May 27, 2008.

Vidal's profile rose following the 2009 election of Deputy Mayor Gabriela Michetti to a seat in the Chamber of Deputies, and she became Mayor Macri's most visible female adviser. Following Macri's decision to forfeit a PRO candidacy for the 2011 presidential election, and instead seek a second term as mayor, he nominated Vidal as his running mate. The duo were reelected by a landslide on July 31, 2011, receiving over 64% of the vote with sociologist Daniel Filmus coming in 2nd place.

Macri selected Vidal as the candidate of his party to run for governor of the Buenos Aires Province in the 2015 elections. The Radical Civic Union, allied with PRO in the coalition Cambiemos, proposed to replace her with Ángel Posse, but Macri kept Vidal. In another negotiation it was proposed that Sergio Massa resigned as candidate to the presidency and ran for governor in Macri's ticket, but Macri kept Vidal as candidate again. She was the first female governor of the province, and it is the first time in 28 years that a non-Peronist candidate has won the election in the country's most populous province.

== Governor of Buenos Aires ==
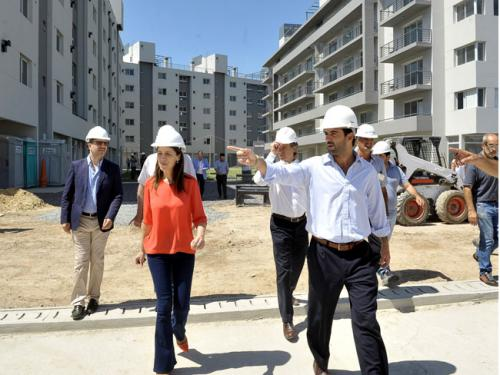
Vidal and Basavilbaso visiting housing works

On 10 December 2015, she swore before the Buenos Aires Legislature. Shortly after assuming as governor, she announced that she would live together with her husband, Ramiro Tagliaferro, in a special residence within the perimeter of the Morón military air base. Although she later divorced Tagliaferro, she continued to reside in the residence for security reasons after having been subject to police threats.

In April 2018, the Konex Foundation awarded her a Konex Award – Diploma of Merit in the Public Administrators category.

=== Cabinet ===
Vidal announced her cabinet on December 4.

It is composed by politicians from the Republican Proposal, the Radical Civic Union and former members of Scioli's cabinet.

- Federico Salvai, Minister of the Government
- Roberto Gigante, Minister of Coordination and Control
- Hernán Lacunza, Minister of Economy
- Cristian Ritondo, Minister of Security
- Edgardo Cenzón, Minister of Planification and Infrastructure
- Alejandro Finocchiaro, Minister of Education
- Alberto Mahiques, Minister of Justice
- Leonardo Sarquis, Minister of Agrarian Affairs
- Santiago López Medrano, Minister of Social Development
- Zulma Ortíz, Minister of Health
- Jorge Elustondo, Minister of Production
- Marcelo Villegas, Minister of Labor

== Political views ==
She is in favor of the universal allocation per child, a social security program introduced during Cristina Kirchner's government.

Vidal has also stated that she and PRO are against the Argentine price controls program, Careful Pricing.

She wants to reduce taxes and she did it in the Province of Buenos Aires.

The Spanish newspaper El País named her "the Argentine Thatcher" after Vidal's intense confrontations with Peronist unionists during her mandate.

After the disappearance of Cecilia Strzyzowksi in 2023 she said "we demand that the provincial justice system act quickly, without delays, without ifs and buts and without attempts at a cover-up. The political ties of the accused cannot interfere. Impunity is not an option".

== Electoral history ==
=== Executive ===
Electoral history of María Eugenia Vidal
Election	Office	List	Votes			Result	Ref.
Election	Office	List	Total	%	P.	Result	Ref.
2011 1-R	Deputy Chief of Government of Buenos Aires	Republican Proposal	836,608	47.07%	1st	→ Round 2	
2011 2-R	Deputy Chief of Government of Buenos Aires	Republican Proposal	1,090,389	64.27%	1st	Elected	
2015	Governor of Buenos Aires	Cambiemos	3,609,312	39.42%	1st	Elected	
2019	Governor of Buenos Aires	Juntos por el Cambio	3,852,624	38.28%	2nd	Not elected	

=== Legislative ===
Electoral history of María Eugenia Vidal
Election	Office	List	#	District	Votes			Result	Ref.
Election	Office	List	#	District	Total	%	P.	Result	Ref.
2007	City Legislator	Republican Proposal Alliance	3	City of Buenos Aires	768,748	44.32%	1st (Note: Presented on an electoral list. The data shown represents the share of the vote the entire party/alliance received in that constituency.)	Elected	
2021	National Deputy	Juntos por el Cambio	1	City of Buenos Aires	867,044	47.09%	1st	Elected	

Political offices
Preceded by Daniel Scioli	Governor of Buenos Aires; 2015–2019	Succeeded by Axel Kicillof
