= Gabriela Michetti =

Vice President of Argentina from 2015 to 2019

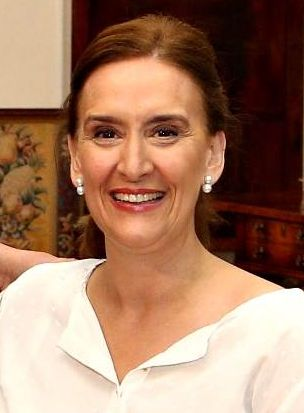
- Michetti in 2016

36th Vice President of Argentina
- In office 10 December 2015 – 10 December 2019
- President: Mauricio Macri
- Preceded by: Amado Boudou
- Succeeded by: Cristina Fernández de Kirchner

National Senator
- In office 10 December 2013 – 10 December 2015
- Constituency: City of Buenos Aires

National Deputy
- In office 10 December 2009 – 9 December 2013
- Constituency: City of Buenos Aires

Deputy Chief of Government of Buenos Aires
- In office 10 December 2007 – 20 April 2009
- Chief of Government: Mauricio Macri
- Preceded by: Jorge Telerman
- Succeeded by: María Eugenia Vidal

Personal details
- Born: Marta Gabriela Michetti Illia; 28 May 1965 (age 61) Laprida, Buenos Aires Province, Argentina
- Party: Republican Proposal
- Other political affiliations: Juntos por el Cambio (2015–present)
- Domestic partner: Eduardo Cura (1990–present)
- Children: 1
- Education: Universidad del Salvador; University of Ottawa
- Profession: International relations lawyer

Marta Gabriela Michetti Illia (Spanish pronunciation: [ɡaˈβɾjela miˈtʃeti]; born 28 May 1965) is an Argentine politician and was Vice President of Argentina from 2015 to 2019 during Mauricio Macri's administration. She is the second woman to serve as vice president, after Isabel Perón.

Michetti is a member of Republican Proposal and Cambiemos. She was Deputy Chief of Government in Buenos Aires from 2007 to 2009. She was National Deputy from 2009 to 2013 and served as National Senator for the City of Buenos Aires since 2013 to 2015.

Ideologically, she is considered conservative; religiously, she is Catholic. She is a great-grandniece of former Argentine president Arturo Umberto Illia.

== Early life and education ==
Marta Gabriela Michetti Illia was born in 1965 in the Buenos Aires Province town of Laprida into a family of Italian background. She earned a degree in International Relations at the Universidad del Salvador, Buenos Aires, in 1988. She completed a master's degree in Business Management and Integration in the UCES between 1993 and 1994 plus a specialization course on dispute settlement in the WTO, in Geneva, Switzerland in 2000; and a career specialization in University Management at the University of Ottawa, Canada in 2001.

== Political career ==
=== Municipal ===
Michetti entered public service in 1989 in the Province of Buenos Aires, and the following year joined the executive staff as a technical adviser at the Argentine Ministry of Economy. Although employed as a professional rather than as a politician, Michetti was political, working through her church on social projects and becoming close to Carlos Auyero of the Christian Democratic Party and FrePaSo.

Michetti joined the Commitment to Change party led by Mauricio Macri in 2003. The party became part of the PRO movement, and she was elected that year to the Buenos Aires City Legislature, where she led the Commitment to Change caucus. Michetti gained recognition in 2006 while leading the inquiry committee looking into alleged negligence after a fire at the República Cromagnon nightclub led to the deaths of 194 people. The scandal led to the resignation of Aníbal Ibarra, then mayor of Buenos Aires.

Michetti was nominated as running mate for Mauricio Macri in 2007, and the ticket resulted elected to office of Mayor and Vice Mayor of the City of Buenos Aires with 61% of the vote, defeating Daniel Filmus and Carlos Heller of the Front for Victory. Michetti thus became the first woman elected Deputy Mayor of Buenos Aires. She directed two planning committees, Programa Puertas del Bicentenario and the Consejo de Planeamiento Estratégico, and drew from her personal tragedy to lead the newly created Commission for the Inclusion and Full Participation of Persons with Disabilities (COPIDIS).

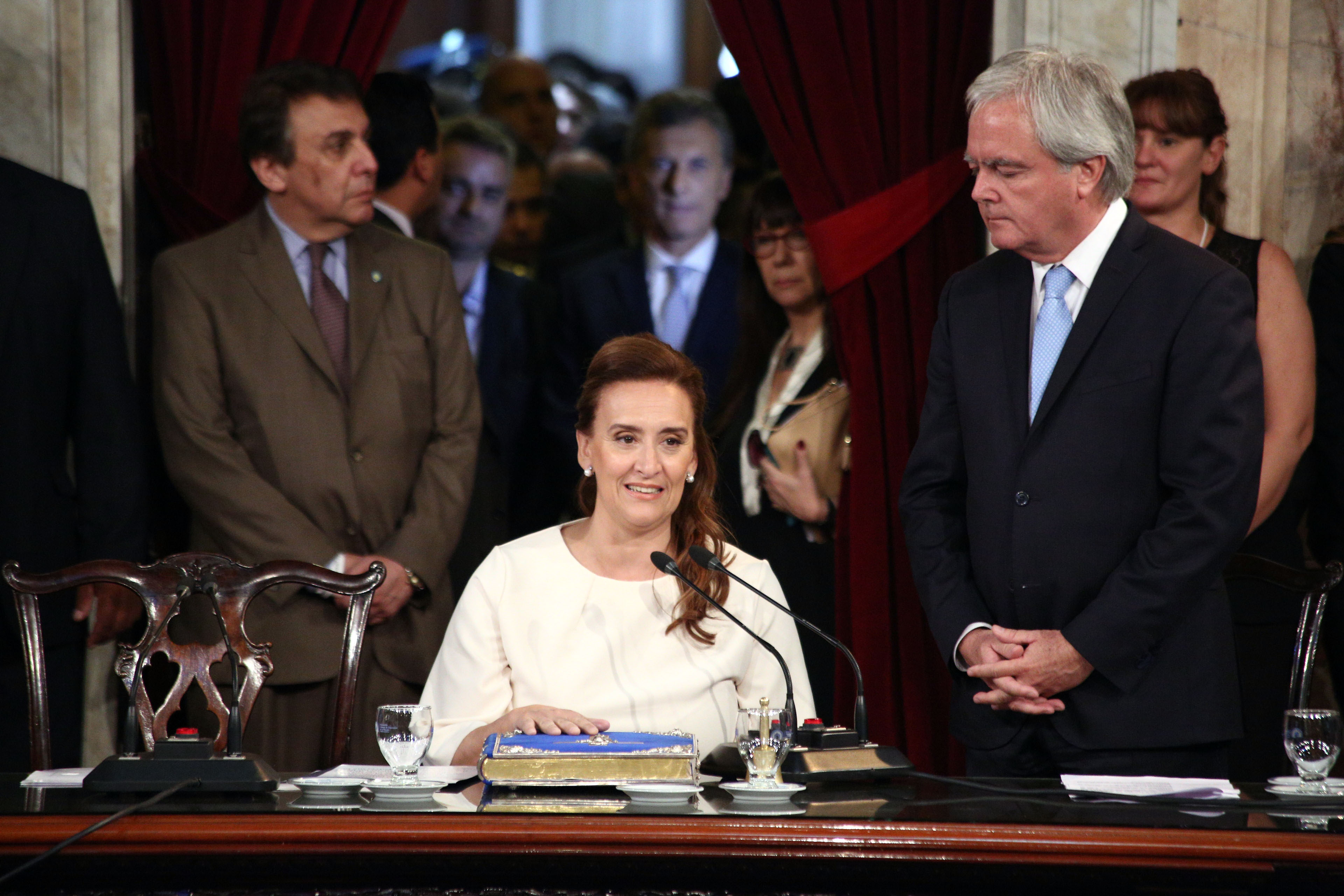
Michetti taking office as Vice President of Argentina in the Argentine National Congress, December 2015.

=== Legislative ===
Ahead of the 2009 elections for Congress, Michetti's name was frequently mentioned as a likely candidate for National Deputy, despite serving less than two years in municipal government. By April, her candidature appeared less likely given the manoeuvres of all the main parties. Much had also been made of her friendship with the leader of the rival Civic Coalition, Elisa Carrió. However, on 20 April Michetti resigned as Deputy Head of Government and confirmed that she would lead the PRO list for Buenos Aires for national deputies.

== Vice President of Argentina (2015–2019) ==
She rejected to run for vice president under Macri in the 2015 national elections, and tried to run for mayor of Buenos Aires instead. Horacio Rodríguez Larreta defeated her during the primary elections, and would run for the Republican Proposal instead. Finally, she ran for vice president under Macri in 2015.

Michetti also collaborates with many NGOs to make possible for them to achieve their goals. In 2008 and 2009, for example she participated in the South American Business Forum as Speaker.

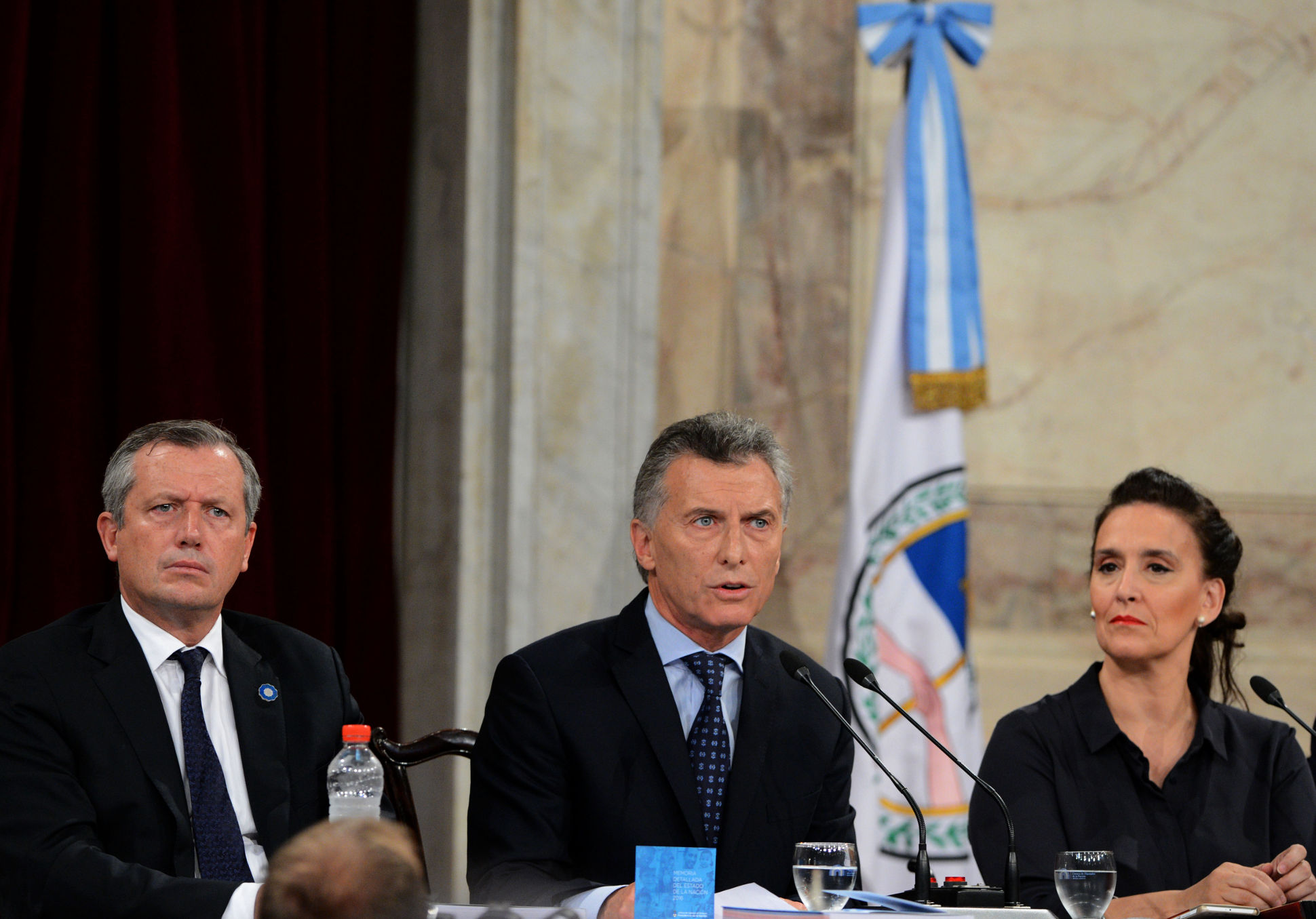
Michetti with President Macri and Emilio Monzo, President of the Argentine Chamber of Deputies, at the Congress Sessions Opening of 2017

On 22 November 2015, after Cambiemos won the first ballotage in Argentina's history, Michetti became Vice President-elect of Argentina. She took office on 10 December 2015.

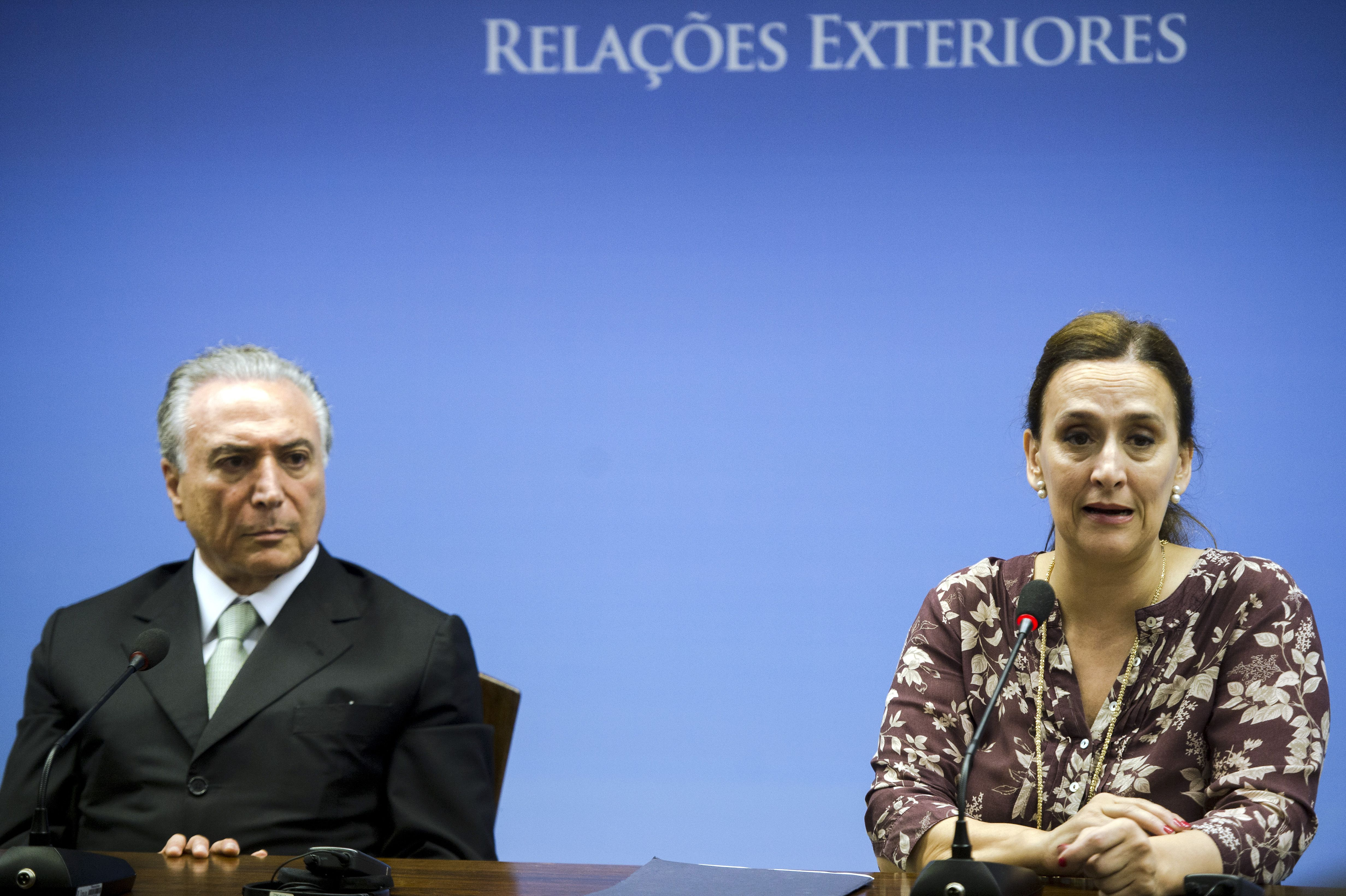
Michetti and then Vice-President of Brazil, Michel Temer in the Itamaraty Palace, Brasília, 2015

=== Inauguration ===
Michetti took office on 10 December 2015, along with President-elect Mauricio Macri, taking an oath before the president. Then the president, delivered a speech of 27 minutes in which he pledged his "support for an independent judiciary, to fight corruption and drug trafficking, the internal union of Argentina, universal social protection, create a twenty-first-century style of education and that everyone can have a roof, water and sewer". He also greeted those who were his competitors during the presidential elections.

Later she went to the Casa Rosada, where the received the presidential attributes in the White Hall at the hands of the Temporary President of the Senate, Federico Pinedo, President of the Chamber of Deputies Emilio Monzó and President of the Supreme Court Ricardo Lorenzetti. Minutes later she and the president went to the historic balcony where thousands of people waited in the Plaza de Mayo.

After being anointed vice president, Michetti gave a reception at the San Martín Palace of Argentina Foreign Ministry to all the heads of state present: Michelle Bachelet from Chile, Horacio Cartes from Paraguay, Juan Manuel Santos from Colombia, Rafael Correa from Ecuador, Evo Morales from Bolivia, Dilma Rousseff from Brazil, and representatives of other countries attending the inauguration.

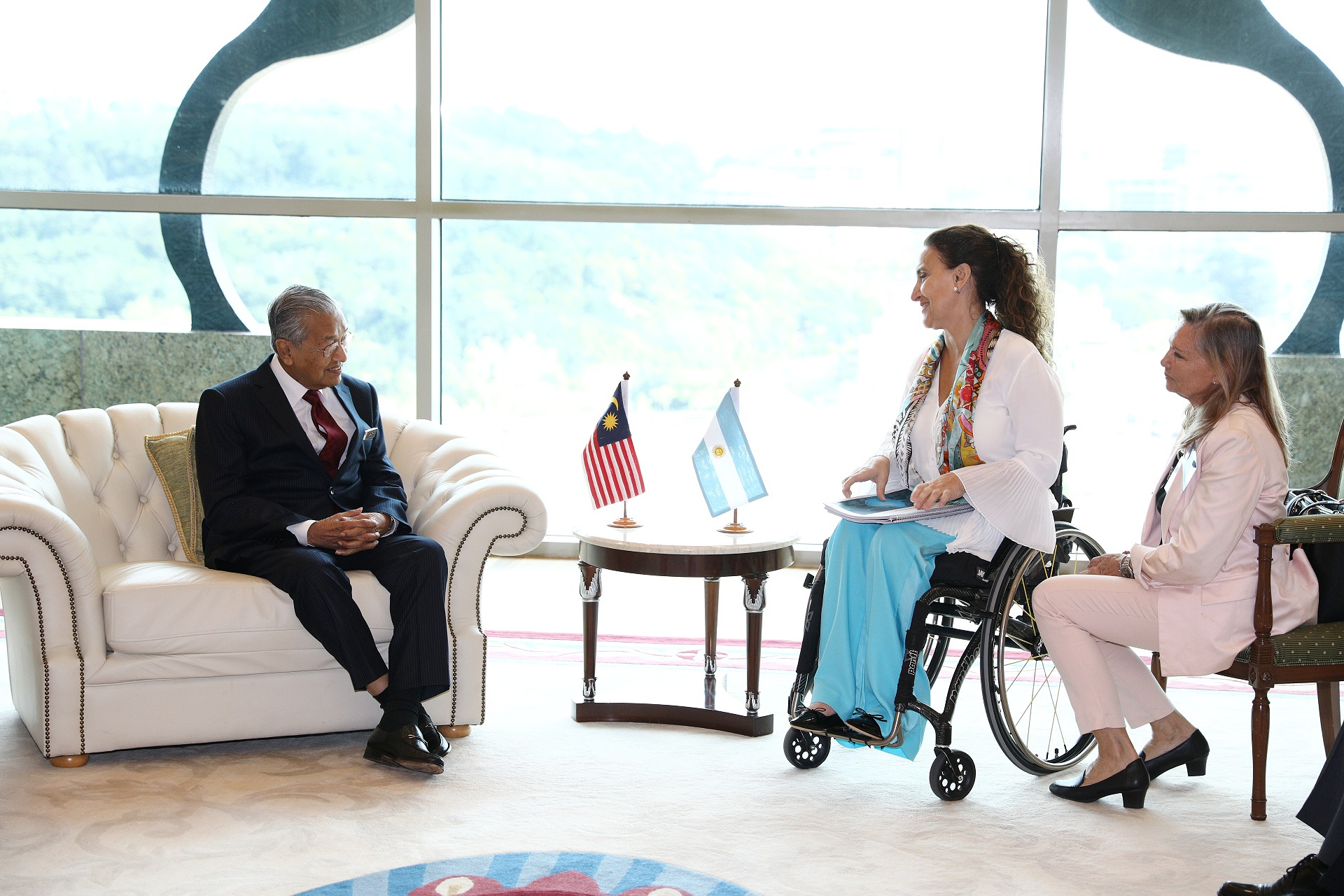
Michetti met with Malaysian prime minister Mahathir Mohamad on May 6, 2019

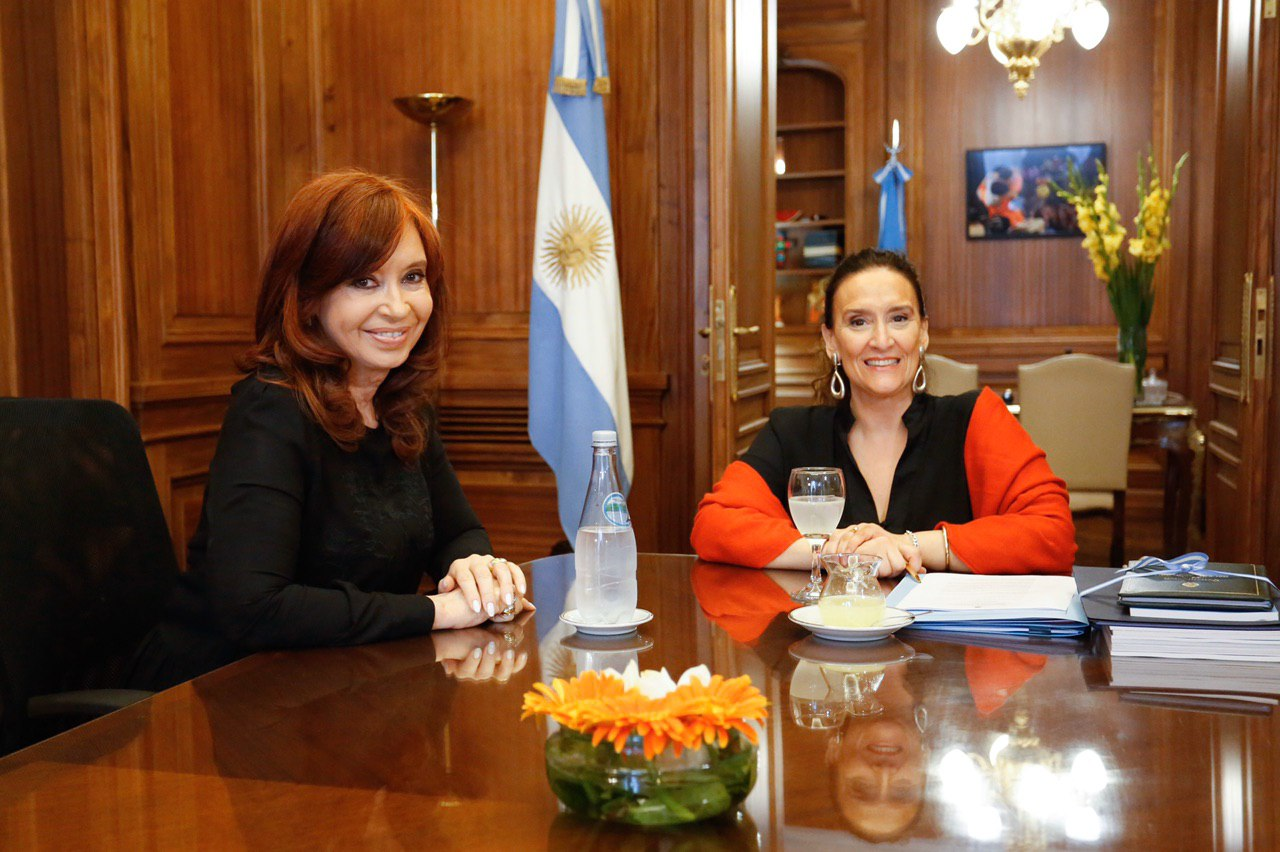
Outgoing vice president Michetti with Vice President-elect Cristina Fernández de Kirchner in 2019

As vice president of the nation, she banned the exchange of tickets in the Senate for money. From this measure, legislators can receive a maximum of $30,000 in cash for "mobility." Passages that are not used within 30 days of the month cannot be accumulated.

== Personal life ==
A car accident in 1994 seriously injured Michetti and left her in a wheelchair. Michetti has one son and had a long relationship with the journalist Eduardo Cura.

Michetti is a staunch Roman Catholic and an opponent of abortion legalization and same-sex marriages in her country.

== Electoral history ==
=== Executive ===
Electoral history of Gabriela Michetti
| Election | Office | List | Votes | | | Result | Ref. |
| Election | Office | List | Total | % | P. | Result | Ref. |
|---|---|---|---|---|---|---|---|
| 2007 1-R | Vice Chief of Government of Buenos Aires | PRO Alliance | 798,292 | 45.76% | 1st | → Round 2 | |
| 2007 2-R | Vice Chief of Government of Buenos Aires | PRO Alliance | 1,007,729 | 60.94% | 1st | Elected | |
| 2015 PASO | Chief of Government of Buenos Aires | We've Got a Team | 352,969 | 19.29% | 2nd | Not elected (Note: Lost in the coalition's internal election.) | |
| 2015 1-R | President of Argentina | Cambiemos | 8,601,131 | 34.15% | 2nd | → Round 2 | |
| 2015 2-R | President of Argentina | Cambiemos | 12,988,349 | 51.34% | 1st | Elected | |

=== Legislative ===
Electoral history of Gabriela Michetti
| Election | Office | List | # | District | Votes | | | Result | Ref. |
| Election | Office | List | # | District | Total | % | P. | Result | Ref. |
|---|---|---|---|---|---|---|---|---|---|
| 2003 | City Legislator | Commitment to Change | 1 | City of Buenos Aires | 179,730 | 10.35% | 4th (Note: Presented on an electoral list. The data shown represents the share of the vote the entire party/alliance received in that constituency.) | Elected | |
| 2009 | National Deputy | Republican Proposal Alliance | 1 | City of Buenos Aires | 567,695 | 31.19% | 1st | Elected | |
| 2013 | National Senator | PRO Union | 1 | City of Buenos Aires | 722,831 | 39.26% | 1st | Elected | |

== Ancestry ==
Ancestors of Gabriela Michetti

4. Alfredo Michetti
2. Mario Oscar Michetti
5. María Estela Ferri
1. Gabriela Michetti
24. Inocencio Illia
12. Juan Inocencio Illia del Giorgio
25. Constanza del Giorgio
6. José "Pepe" Illia
3. Marta Reneé Illia
7. María del Giorgio

Political offices
| Preceded by Amado Boudou | Vice President of Argentina; 2015–19 | Succeeded by Cristina Fernández de Kirchner |
