= Luis Zamora =

Argentine politician

Luis Fernando Zamora
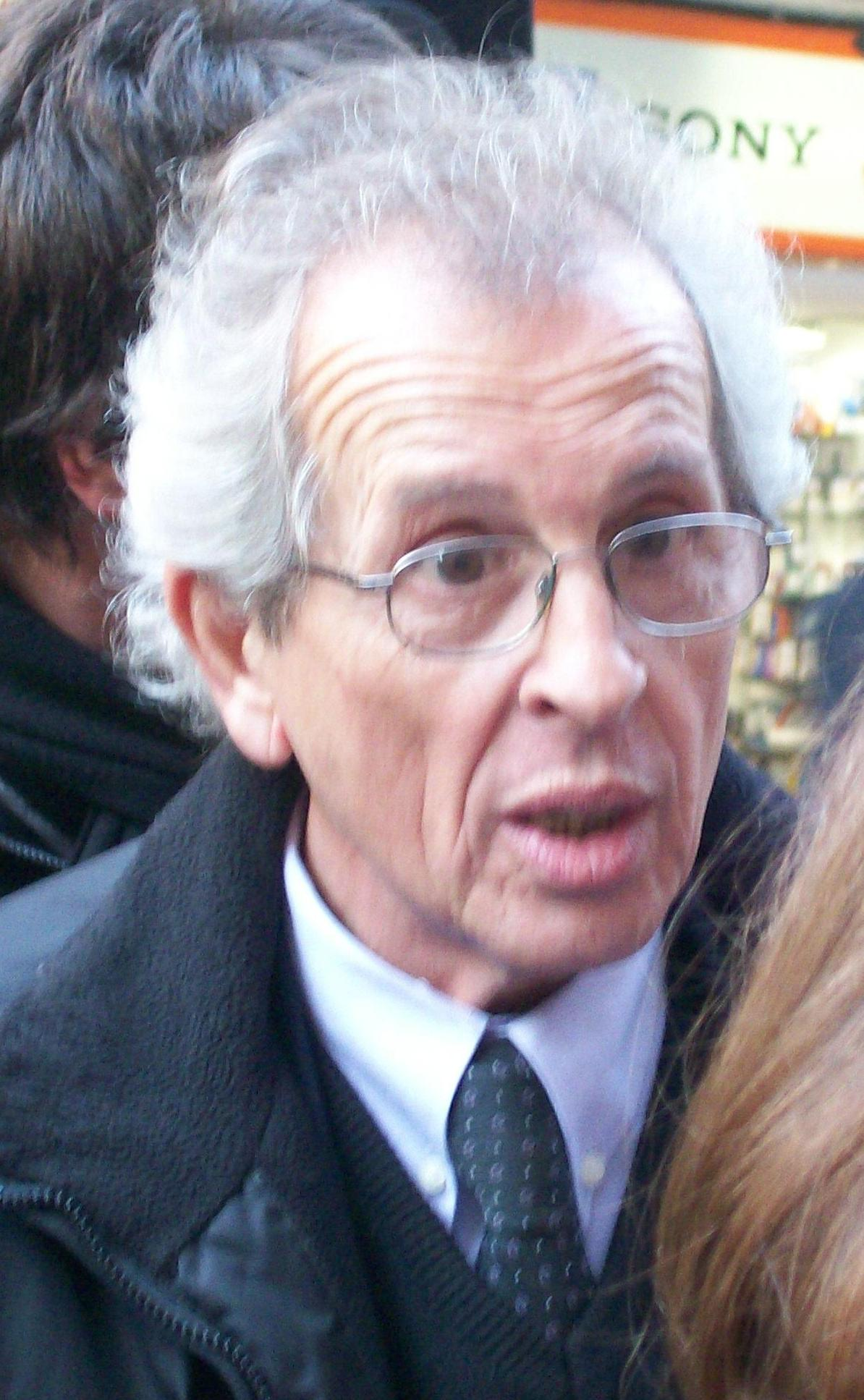

National Deputy
- In office 10 December 2001 – 10 December 2005
- Constituency: City of Buenos Aires
- In office 10 December 1989 – 10 December 1993
- Constituency: Buenos Aires

Personal details
- Born: 17 February 1948 (age 78)
- Party: Self-determination and Freedom
- Education: University of Belgrano
- Occupation: Lawyer

Luis Zamora (Buenos Aires, 17 February, 1948) is an Argentinian lawyer and politician.

He is the leader of the Self-determination and Freedom party and served as National Deputy between 1989 and 1993 and again in 2001 and 2005. He has unsuccessfully ran for Chief of Government of Buenos Aires on three occasions: in 2003, in 2011 and in 2015.

He graduated in Law from the University of Belgrano. During a visit by president George H. W. Bush to the Argentinian Congress in 1991 in Buenos Aires he yelled at Bush and was sent out of the room.
