= 2003 Buenos Aires City elections =

- Mayoral election
← 2000	24 August 2003 (first round); 14 September 2003 (second round)	2007 →
- Turnout: 69.83% (first round); 70.50% (second round)
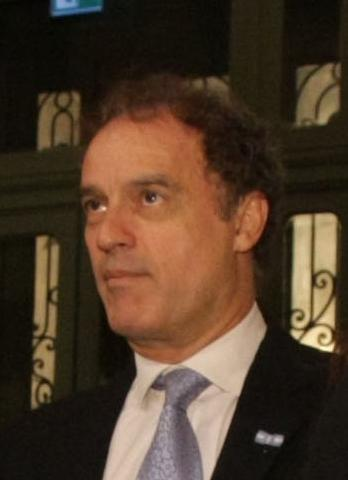

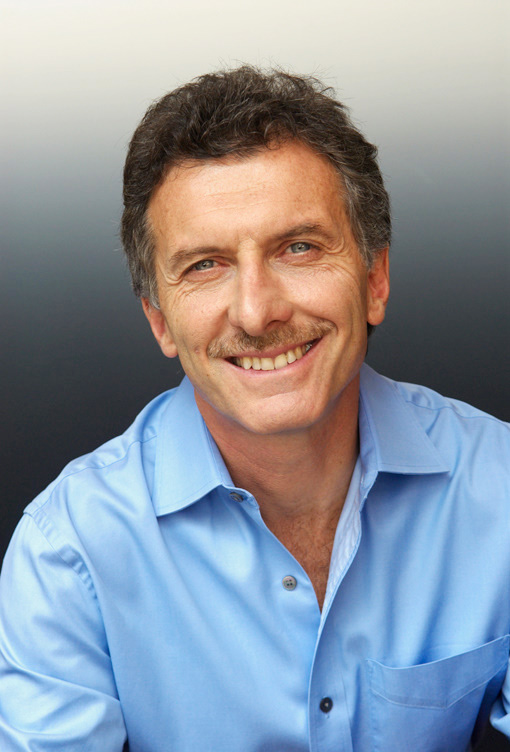
Nominee	Aníbal Ibarra	Mauricio Macri
Party	Broad Front	Independent
Alliance	FP	CpC
Running mate	Jorge Telerman	Horacio Rodríguez Larreta
Popular vote	928,056	807,385
Percentage	53.48%	46.52%
Chief of Government before election
Aníbal Ibarra
FG–FP
Elected Chief of Government
Aníbal Ibarra
FG–FP
- City Legislature
← 2000	24 August 2003	2005 →
- All 60 seats in the City Legislature
- Turnout: 69.83%
Party	Leader	Vote %	Seats	+/–
CpC	Mauricio Macri	36.15	23	New
FP	Aníbal Ibarra	31.44	21	New
AyL	Luis Zamora	10.76	8	New
UPRBA	Patricia Bullrich	9.92	6	New
UCR	Cristian Caram	2.20	1	New
IU	Vilma Ripoll	1.89	1	−1
This lists parties that won seats. See the complete results below.

General elections were held in the City of Buenos Aires on 24 August 2003 to elect the Chief of Government (mayor) and entirety of the City Legislature. As no mayoral candidate won a majority in the first round, a runoff was held on 14 September 2003, in which incumbent Aníbal Ibarra, of the Broad Front, defeated Mauricio Macri of the Commitment to Change (CpC) coalition to be re-elected as Chief of Government of Buenos Aires.

The entirety of the City Legislature was elected for the last time, and following the election, through a draw it was decided which half of the elected legislators (30 out of 60) would complete a full four year-term, and which half would only serve a two year-term (due to be renewed in the 2005 legislative election).

The elections were due to be held in 2004, but were held earlier in order to unify the national electoral calendar with that of Buenos Aires City, following an agreement between Ibarra and President of Argentina Eduardo Duhalde.

== Background ==
The 2000 elections in Buenos Aires resulted in the election of progressive former prosecutor Aníbal Ibarra as mayor. With 49.30% of the vote, Ibarra did not win the necessary 50% to win in a single round, and should have gone on to face the second-most voted candidate, former economy minister Domingo Cavallo of Action for the Republic. However, Cavallo dropped off the race shortly after the first round following backlash against his denial of the election's results, which he called "a fraud".

Following negotiations between Ibarra and Argentine president Eduardo Duhalde, it was agreed the next general election in the City of Buenos Aires would be held earlier than originally intended, in order to make the city's elections match the national and provincial electoral calendars, since after the return of democracy to Argentina in 1983, no national nor provincial elections were held on even years.

Part of the agreement also meant the entirety of the City Legislature was elected for the last time, and following the election, through a draw it was decided which half of the elected legislators (30 out of 60) would complete a full four year-term, and which half would only serve a two year-term (due to be renewed in the 2005 legislative election).

== Candidates ==
Coalition	Mayoral candidate (party) Prior political experience	Vice mayoral candidate (party) Prior political experience	Parties
	Aníbal Ibarra (FG); Chief of Government (2000–2003)	Jorge Telerman (PJ); Secretary of Culture (2000–2003)	FG; FPV; PS; ARI; PI; MyMS; PAIS; GESTA; PDC; PRD
	Mauricio Macri (Ind.); President of Boca Juniors (1995–2007)	Horacio Rodríguez Larreta (PJ); Head of the General Tax Directorate (2001–2002)	PJ; PDP; PD; PF; UNIR; APR; PPC; TPLJ; PA; PGP
	Luis Zamora; National Deputy (2001–2005)	Sergio Daniel Molina	AyL
	Patricia Bullrich (UPT); Minister of Labour (2001)	Carlos Manfroni (Recrear)	Recrear; UPT
	Cristian Caram (UCR); City Legislator (2000–2003)	Ernesto Aldo Isuani (UCR)	UCR
	Vilma Ripoll (MST); City Legislator (2000–2003)	Herman Schiller (Ind.)	MST; PO

== Results ==
=== Chief of Government ===
Candidate	Running mate	Party	First round		Second round	
Candidate	Running mate	Party	Votes	%	Votes	%
Aníbal Ibarra	Jorge Telerman	Porteño Force	590,051	33.75	928,056	53.48
Mauricio Macri	Horacio Rodríguez Larreta	Commitment to Change	660,748	37.79	807,385	46.52
Luis Zamora	Sergio Daniel Molina	Self-determination and Freedom	216,168	12.36		
Patricia Bullrich	Carlos Manfroni	Union to Recreate Buenos Aires	171,765	9.82		
Cristian Caram	Ernesto Aldo Isuani	Radical Civic Union	33,324	1.91		
Vilma Ripoll	Herman Schiller	United Left	21,203	1.21		
Lía Méndez	Graciela Cassiani	Humanist Party	11,000	0.63		
Jorge Selser	María Magdalena Macaggi	Authentic Socialist Party	6,054	0.35		
Marcelo Ramal	María Rachid	Workers' Party	5,449	0.31		
Lucio César Somoza	Juan Manuel María Soaje	People's Reconstruction Party	4,838	0.28		
Joaquín Mario Vilella	Ricardo Marcelino Gargiulo	Movement of Pensioners and Youth	4,567	0.26		
Ariel Julio Ferrari	Fernando Bruno Piqué Covone	Movement of Pensioners in Action	4,153	0.24		
Luis Alberto Clementi	Miriam Lilian Mac Allister	Integration and Development Movement	2,425	0.14		
Christian Castillo	Andrea D'Atri	Socialist Workers' Party	2,425	0.14		
Mariana de Alva	Lucio Tato	Party for a Republic with Opportunities	1,883	0.11		
Mariano Mera Figueroa	Beatriz María Sollazo	Movement for Dignity and Independence	1,720	0.10		
Julián Licastro	Guillermo Pinto Kramer	White Party of Buenos Aires City	1,717	0.10		
Juan Ricardo Mussa	Irene Fernanda Herrera	Front of Workers, Unemployed and Pensioners for the Unity of Buenos Aires City	1,883	0.11		
Jorge Guidobono Rey	Ramón Ferreyra	Revolutionary Socialist League	1,492	0.09		
Enrique Javier Martorell	Fernando Jorge Aren	Republican Reconstruction Party	1,338	0.08		
Andrea Fabiana Salmini	Víctor Rodolfo Onesti	Socialist Advance Movement	1,277	0.07		
Julio Roberto Muñoz	Marta Inés Enciso	Citizen Integration Movement	1,151	0.07		
César Augusto Arias	Rita Alicia Fiorillo	Party of the Intermediate Generation	1,111	0.06		
Juan Carlos Beica	Jorge Alberto Rosales	Socialist Convergence	804	0.05		
Total			1,748,546	100.00	1,735,441	100.00
Valid votes			1,748,546	96.97	1,735,441	94.75
Invalid votes			15,512	0.86	45,481	2.48
Blank votes			39,168	2.17	50,664	2.77
Total votes			1,803,226	100.00	1,831,586	100.00
Registered voters/turnout			2,597,993	69.41	2,597,993	70.50

=== Legislature ===
Party or alliance		Votes	%	Seats
Commitment to Change	Porteño Hope Front	211,783	12.20	8
Commitment to Change	Commitment to Change	179,730	10.35	7
Commitment to Change	Porteño Generational Movement	140,645	8.10	5
Commitment to Change	Centre Alliance	95,398	5.50	3
Commitment to Change	Total	627,556	36.15	23
Porteño Force	Porteño Force	240,270	13.84	9
Porteño Force	Party of the City	177,334	10.22	7
Porteño Force	Party of the Democratic Revolution	128,173	7.38	5
Porteño Force	Total	545,777	31.44	21
Self-determination and Freedom		217,583	12.53	8
Union to Recreate Buenos Aires		172,219	9.92	6
Radical Civic Union		38,198	2.20	1
United Left		32,833	1.89	1
Humanist Party		14,312	0.82	0
Party of the Folk		9,884	0.57	0
Authentic Socialist Party		8,760	0.50	0
Workers' Party		7,691	0.44	0
Christian Democratic Party		5,380	0.31	0
People's Reconstruction Party		5,194	0.30	0
Party of Pensioners in Action		4,611	0.27	0
Citizen Action Party		3,970	0.23	0
Movement for the Recovery of the Republic		3,794	0.22	0
Movement of Pensioners and Social Leaders		3,692	0.21	0
Movement of Pensioners and Youth		3,660	0.21	0
Socialist Workers' Party		3,209	0.18	0
Integration and Development Movement		3,111	0.18	0
Change with Social Justice		3,038	0.18	0
Party for a Republic with Opportunities		2,546	0.15	0
Movement for Dignity and Independence		2,153	0.12	0
White Party of the Federal Capital		2,049	0.12	0
Front of Workers, Unemployed and Pensioners for the Unity of Buenos Aires City		1,885	0.11	0
Revolutionary Socialist League		1,760	0.10	0
Republican Reconstruction Party		1,747	0.10	0
New Social Hope		1,630	0.09	0
Movement for Socialism		1,468	0.08	0
Party of the Intermediate Generation		1,384	0.08	0
Citizen Integration Movement		1,355	0.08	0
Reconquest Party		1,282	0.07	0
Socialist Convergence		1,070	0.06	0
Party for Social Convergence		1,016	0.06	0
Total		1,735,817	100.00	60
Valid votes		1,735,817	95.68	
Invalid votes		16,598	0.91	
Blank votes		61,705	3.40	
Total votes		1,814,120	100.00	
Registered voters/turnout		2,597,993	69.83	

== See also ==
- 2003 Argentine general election
- List of mayors and chiefs of government of Buenos Aires
