= Horacio Rodríguez Larreta =

Argentine economist and politician (born 1965)

Horacio Rodríguez-Larreta
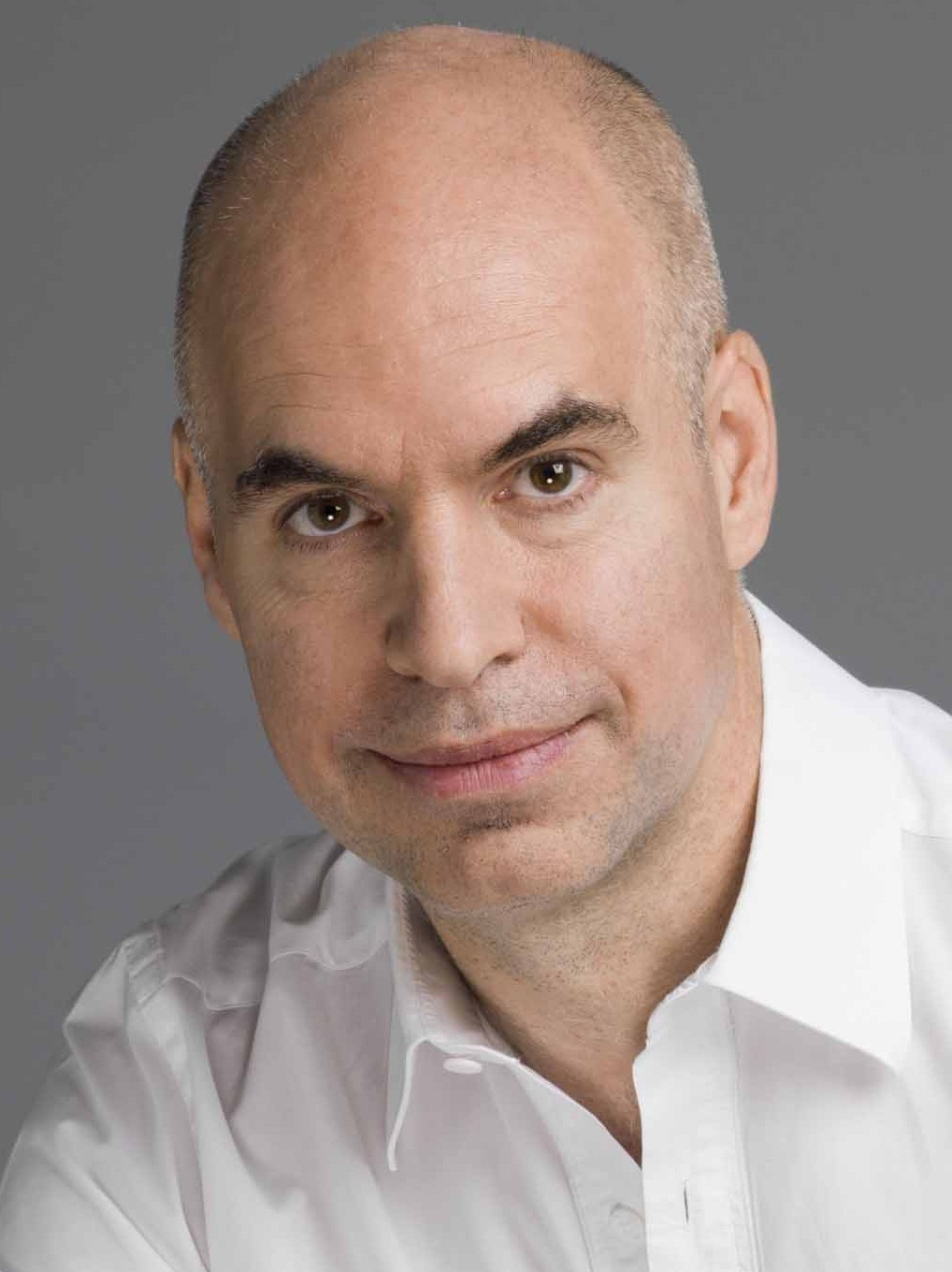
- Rodríguez-Larreta in 2012

6th Chief of Government of Buenos Aires
- In office 10 December 2015 – 7 December 2023
- Deputy: Diego Santilli
- Preceded by: Mauricio Macri
- Succeeded by: Jorge Macri

Chief of the Cabinet of Ministers of Buenos Aires
- In office 10 December 2007 – 10 December 2015
- Mayor: Mauricio Macri
- Preceded by: Raúl Fernández
- Succeeded by: Felipe Miguel

Personal details
- Born: 29 October 1965 (age 60) Buenos Aires, Argentina
- Party: Justicialist (1993–2003); Commitment to Change (2003–2008); Republican Proposal (since 2008)
- Other political affiliations: Juntos por el Cambio (since 2015)
- Spouse: Bárbara Díez de Tejada (m. 2001; sep. 2020)
- Children: 2
- Education: University of Buenos Aires; Harvard Business School
- Occupation: Economist; politician

Horacio Rodríguez-Larreta (Spanish pronunciation: [oˈɾasjo roˈðɾiɣes laˈreta]; born 29 October 1965) is an Argentine economist, politician and the former Chief of Government of the City of Buenos Aires. Larreta was re-elected in 2019 with almost 56% of the votes, becoming the first candidate to win a mayoral election in the first round since the adoption of Buenos Aires's autonomous constitution. He won in every comuna, except Comuna 4 and Comuna 8.

Since 2019, he assumed the leadership of the Argentine opposition, Juntos por el Cambio. In February 2023, he announced his candidacy for the presidency in the 2023 general election. He competed against fellow PRO member Patricia Bullrich for the coalition's nomination but lost in the August 2023 primaries with 11% of the vote against Bullrich's 17%.

== Early life and education ==
Rodríguez-Larreta was born in Buenos Aires on 29 October 1965. On his father's side, Rodríguez-Larreta is of Basque descent; his ancestors were a wealthy landowning family from Gipuzkoa. His father, Horacio Rodríguez-Larreta (1934–2004) was a prominent member of the Integration and Development Movement and chairman of Racing Club, while his great-uncle, the namesake Horacio Rodríguez Larreta (1871–1935) was Attorney General of Argentina during the presidency of Marcelo Torcuato de Alvear.

Rodríguez-Larreta is also descended from the Leloir family, a wealthy family of French Argentines who once owned the lands that are now Parque Leloir, in Ituzaingó, Buenos Aires, and the Unzué family (through Mariano Unzué), former owners of the now-demolished Palacio Unzué. He finished high school at the Escuela Argentina Modelo, and graduated with a degree in economics at the University of Buenos Aires in 1988 and obtained a Master in Business Administration in Harvard Business School. He returned to Argentina in 1993.

== Early political career ==
Rodríguez-Larreta's political career began in the Justicialist Party. In 1995, during the presidency of Carlos Menem, he was appointed director of the National Social Security Administration. In 1998 he moved to the Ministry of Social Development. He led the Comprehensive Medical Attention Program in 2000, during the presidency of Fernando de la Rúa. Rodríguez-Larreta's administration is credited with improving the financial structure of the organization by imposing budget cuts.

=== Republican Proposal ===
He helped Mauricio Macri to create the political party Commitment to Change, which would eventually become the Republican Proposal (PRO). Macri became Mayor of Buenos Aires and Larreta served as Chief of the Cabinet of Ministers for eight years.

Rodríguez-Larreta and Gabriela Michetti ran against each other in the primary elections of PRO Union, a center-right coalition in 2015, with Rodríguez-Larreta ely winning the party's support for mayorship of Buenos Aires. On 5 July 2015, LarretaRodríguez- won 45% of the vote, forcing a runoff with the leader of center-left Evolution's, Martín Lousteau, who secured 28% of the vote.

Rodríguez-Larreta won the ballottage by three points over Lousteau and succeeded Mauricio Macri as Mayor of the City since 2015.

In these elections, PRO was stronger in wealthier northern Buenos Aires, while ECO was stronger in the southern, poorer neighborhoods of the city.

== Chief of Government of Buenos Aires ==
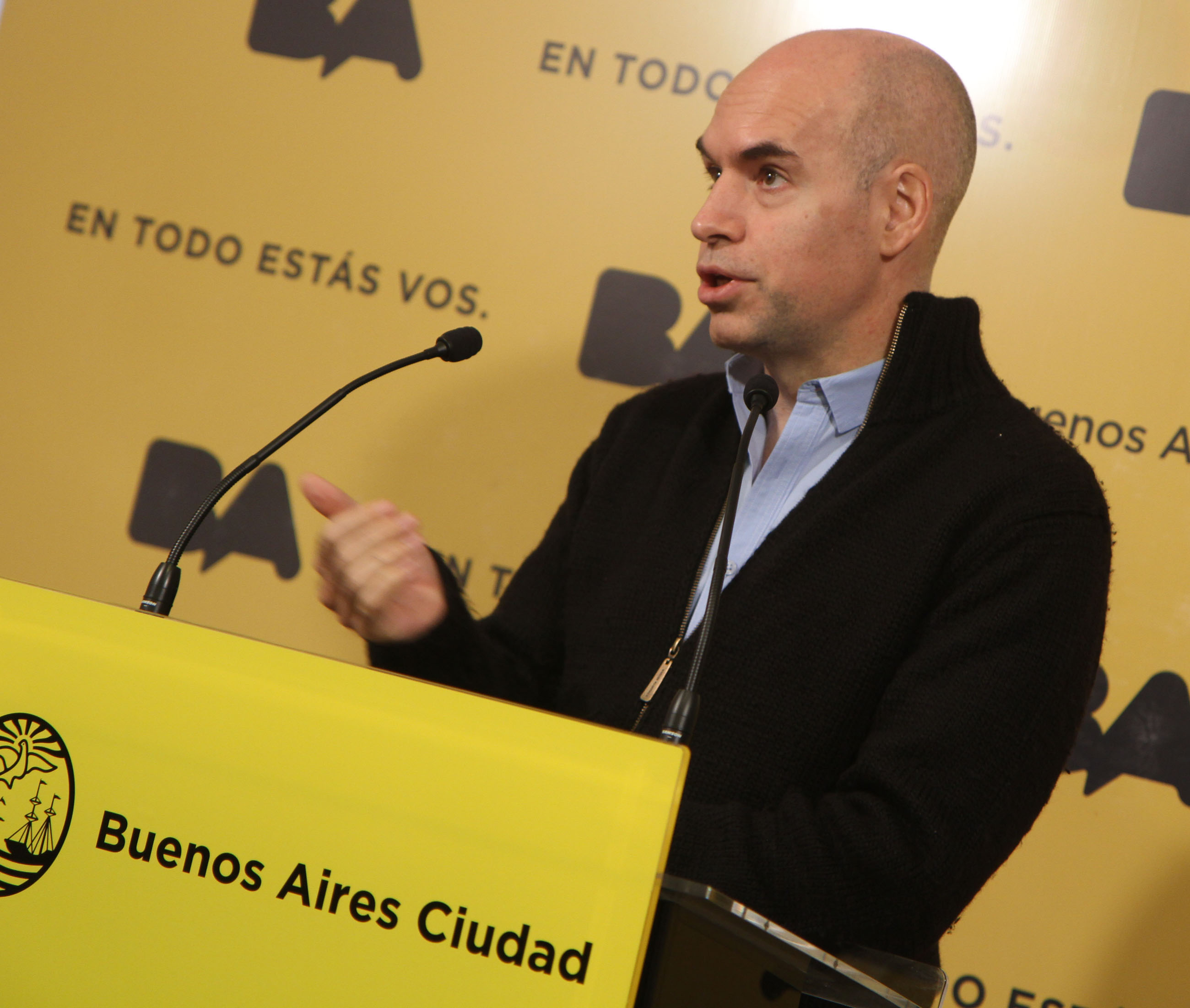
Rodríguez-Larreta at a press conference

Mauricio Macri was elected President of Argentina in 2015, and Rodríguez-Larreta was elected Mayor of Buenos Aires, both for the PRO party.

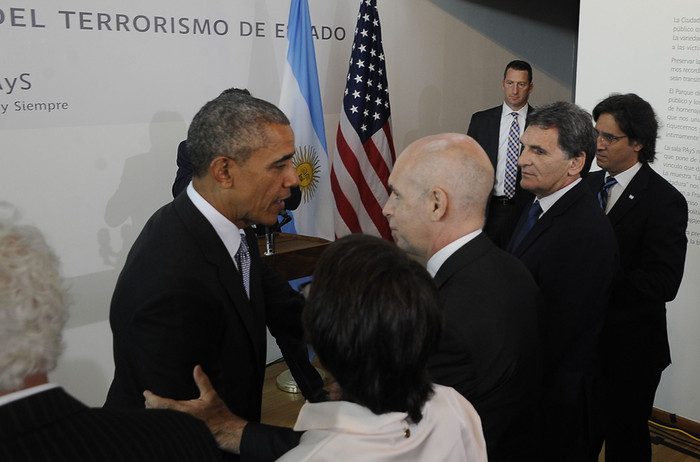
Rodríguez-Larreta with Barack Obama in 2016

=== Security ===
Macri transferred a part of the Argentine Federal Police to Buenos Aires, as it had been requested by the city many years before. With the police under his control, Larreta went on to remove the manteros (streetwalk vendors) from the Caballito and Once neighborhoods.

In 2017, Rodríguez-Larreta formed the Buenos Aires City Police, merging officers from the Federal and Metropolitan police forces.

=== Public work ===
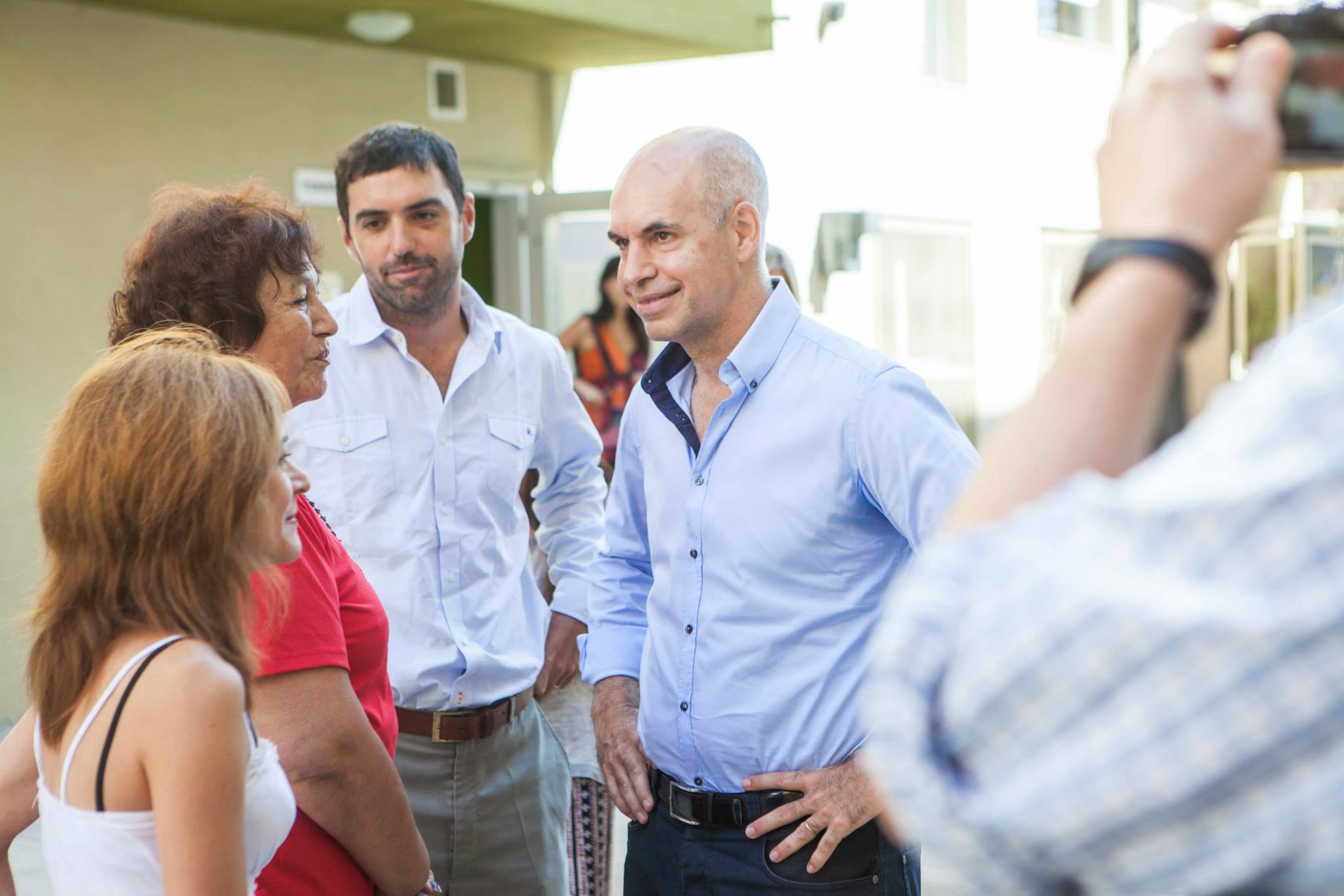
Rodríguez-Larreta inaugurating a housing complex

During its management, the work of the Paseo del Bajo was started and inaugurated, which is the 7.1-kilometer road corridor that will connect the Illia and Buenos Aires-La Plata highways, the work in question began during January 2017 and the 27 May 2019 shortening the journey from 50 minutes to 10 minutes. It will generate 100,000 square meters of public and green space and improve the circulation of 134,000 daily passengers.

He also inaugurated the work of the Mitre Viaduct, which will raise the Mitre line of the metropolitan train over its current course, enabling new level crossings and eliminating traditional barriers. It is 3.9 km inside the city. The objective of this work is to eliminate the level crossings of the streets Monroe, Blanco Encalada, Mendoza, Juramento, Olazábal, Sucre, La Pampa and Olleros. In addition, 4 safe crossings will be opened on streets that were closed to traffic: Roosevelt, Echeverría and Virrey del Pino, for vehicular traffic, and José Hernández, an exclusive pedestrian crossing.

In 2018, Rodríguez-Larreta's government inaugurated a new station on Line H serving the University of Buenos Aires Faculty of Law in the Recoleta neighborhood. In mid-2019, the three new stations of the extension of Line E (Correo Central, Catalinas and Retiro), were inaugurated. After 45 years of sustained Subway growth, new subway stations construction was halted in 2018 by his administration

During its first term, 3 viaducts were built, 9 km of underground work of the Vega Stream, 7 stations of subway, 10,000 security cameras, 62.5 km of metrobus extension, 54 new schools, 10,000 new homes, 7 monitoring centers, 46 health centers, the Olympic District was built, the San Martin Theater was reopened, the Corrientes Street, the Youth Olympic Games were held in 2018, neighborhoods were integrated and urbanized and the City became 100% led

Also, he broke a world record selling 267 hectares of Public Lands without consulting their citizens, same as selling 126 "Plazas de Mayo" (May Park) .

=== Reelection ===
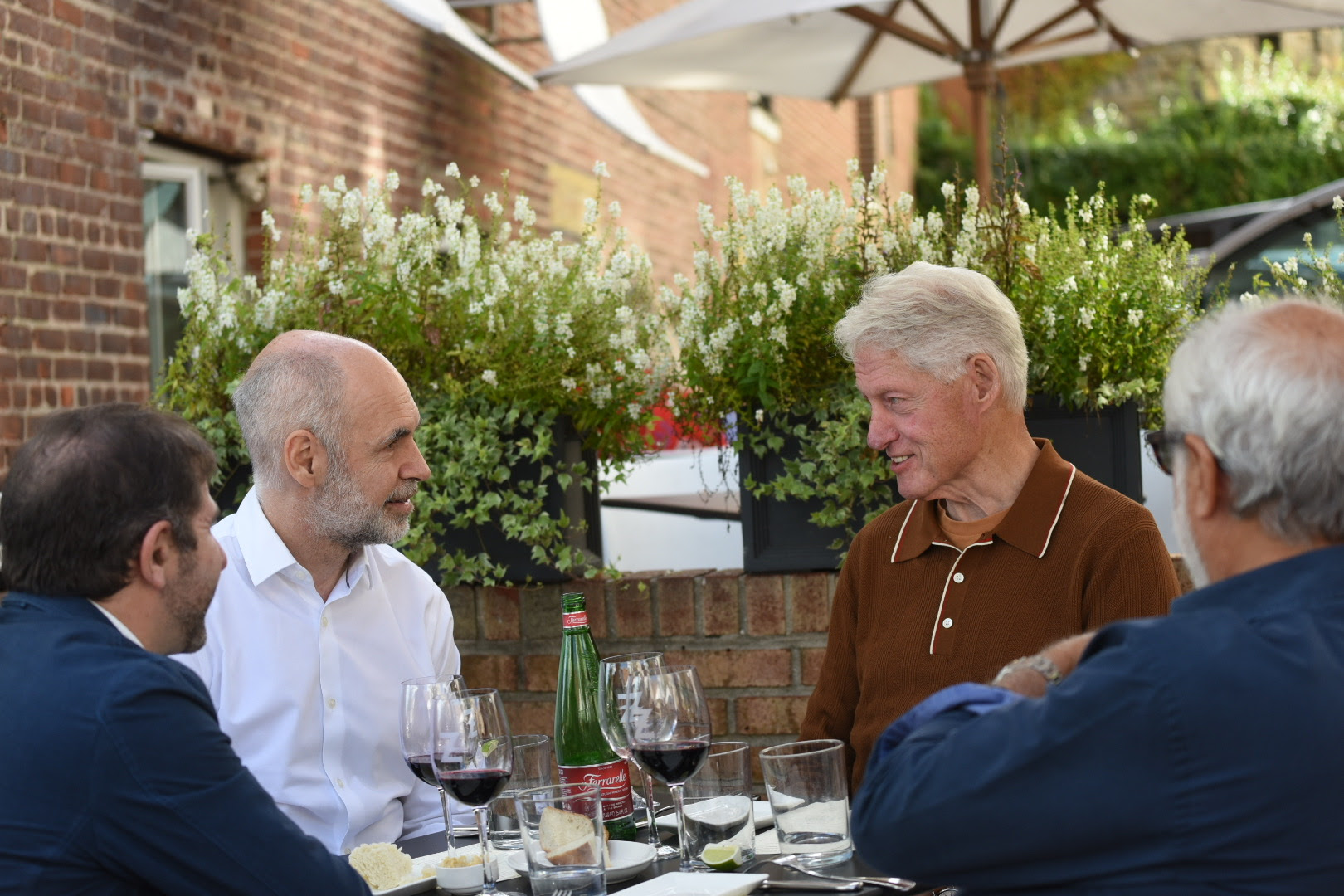
Rodríguez-Larreta with Bill Clinton in September 2021

Larreta was re-elected in 2019 with almost 56% of the votes, becoming the first candidate to win a mayoral election in the first round since the adoption of Buenos Aires's autonomous constitution. He won in every comuna, except Comuna 4 and Comuna 8.

=== Cabinet ===
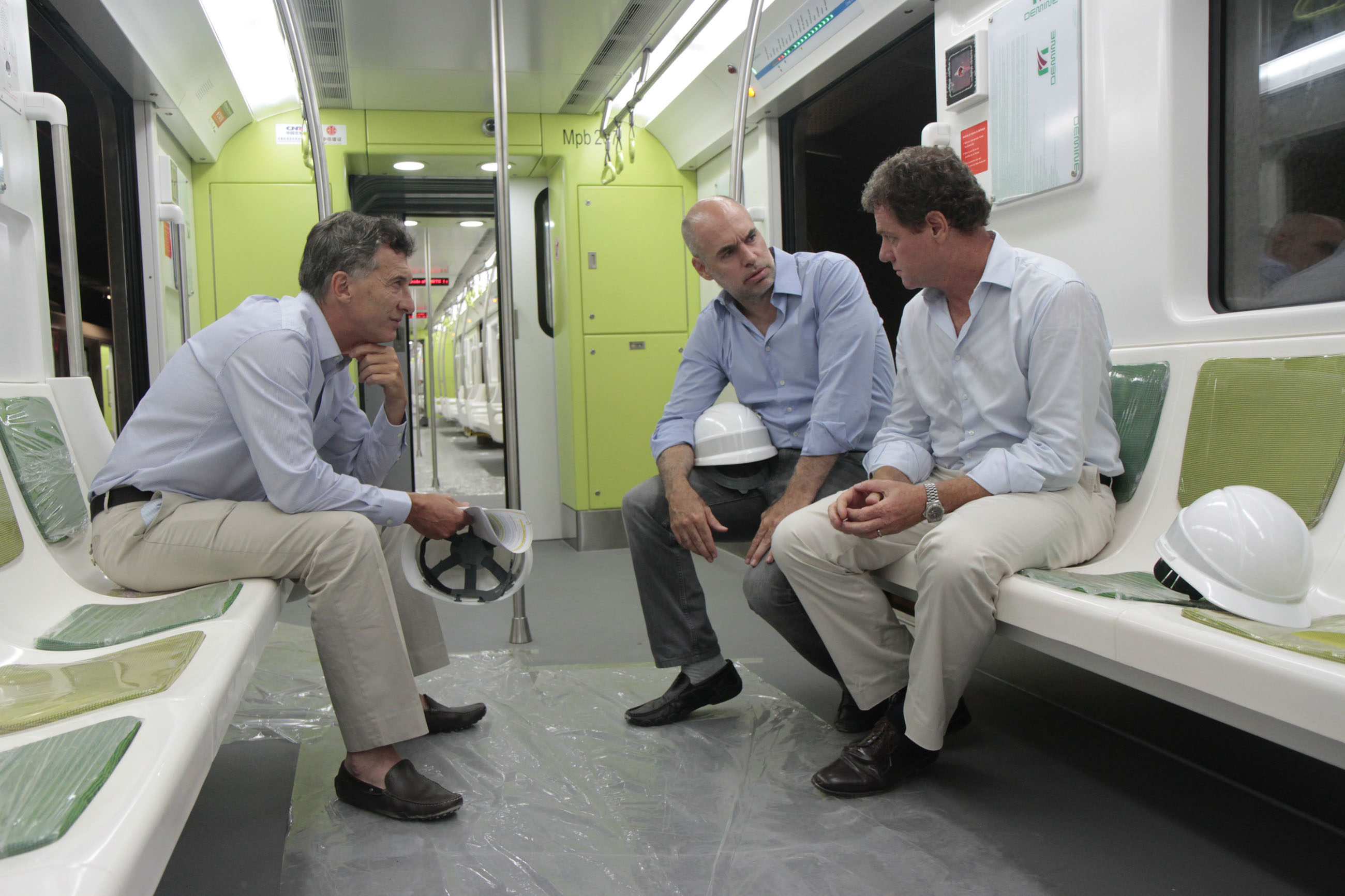
Rodríguez-Larreta with then-mayor Mauricio Macri and SBASE chief Juan Pablo Picardo on a 200 Series train

Rodríguez-Larreta announced his cabinet on 3 December, a week before taking office. It is composed of:

- Felipe Miguel, chief of cabinet of ministers
- Fernando Straface, general secretary
- Soledad Acuña, minister of education
- Ana María Bou Pérez, minister of health
- Guadalupe Tagliaferri, minister of urban development
- Leticia Montiel, legal and technical secretary
- Andrés Freire, minister of modernization
- Darío Lopérfido, minister of culture
- Martín Ocampo, minister of justice
- Eduardo Macchiavelli, minister of public space
- Franco Moccia, minister of transport
- Martín Mura, minister of finances
- Bruno Screnci, minister of government
- Marcelo Nachón, secretary of media

== Personal life ==
Rodríguez-Larreta is married to Bárbara Díez de Tejada, a wednner, since 2001. He and Díez de Tejada have two daughters, Paloma (born 2003) and Serena (born 2016), while Díez de Tejada has an older daughter, Manuela, from an earlier marriage. Rodríguez-Larreta and Díez de Tejada have been separated since 2020. In October 2022, he made public his relationship with Milagros Maylin, a public officer in the Buenos Aires City Government.

Rodríguez-Larreta is a Roman Catholic. He has stated his personal opposition to the legalization of abortion in Argentina.

Rodríguez-Larreta suffers from essential tremor (ET).

== Electoral history ==
=== Executive ===
Electoral history of Horacio Rodríguez Larreta
Election	Office	List	Votes			Result	Ref.
Election	Office	List	Total	%	P.	Result	Ref.
2003 1-R	Deputy Chief of Government of Buenos Aires	Commitment to Change	660,748	37.79%	2nd	→ Round 2	
2003 2-R	Deputy Chief of Government of Buenos Aires	Commitment to Change	807,385	46.52%	2nd	Not elected	
2015 1-R	Chief of Government of Buenos Aires	Republican Proposal	832,619	45.56%	1st	→ Round 2	
2015 2-R	Chief of Government of Buenos Aires	Republican Proposal	861,380	51.64%	1st	Elected	
2019	Chief of Government of Buenos Aires	Juntos por el Cambio	1,095,013	55.90%	1st	Elected	
2023 PASO	President of Argentina	Juntos por el Cambio	2,675,563	11.30%	4th	Not elected (Note: Lost in the coalition's internal election.)	

=== Legislative ===
Electoral history of Horacio Rodríguez Larreta
Election	Office	List	#	District	Votes			Result	Ref.
Election	Office	List	#	District	Total	%	P.	Result	Ref.
2025	City Legislator	Let's Come Back Buenos Aires	1	City of Buenos Aires	132,788	8.08%	4th (Note: Presented on an electoral list. The data shown represents the share of the vote the entire party/alliance received in that constituency.)	Elected	

== Publications ==
- 1996: Tecnología y competitividad en el Mercosur
- 1997: Hacia un nuevo sector público
- 1998: Domando al elefante blanco
- 1999: El desafío de la igualdad
- 2004: La reconstrucción del Estado
- 2005: Cómo superar el default social
- 2006: El país que queremos

== Notes ==
Political offices
Preceded by Mauricio Macri	Chief of Government of Buenos Aires; 2015–2023	Succeeded by Jorge Macri
