= List of mayors and chiefs of government of Buenos Aires City =

Chief of Government of Buenos Aires
- Spanish: Jefe de Gobierno de la Ciudad de Buenos Aires
- Coat of arms of Buenos Aires

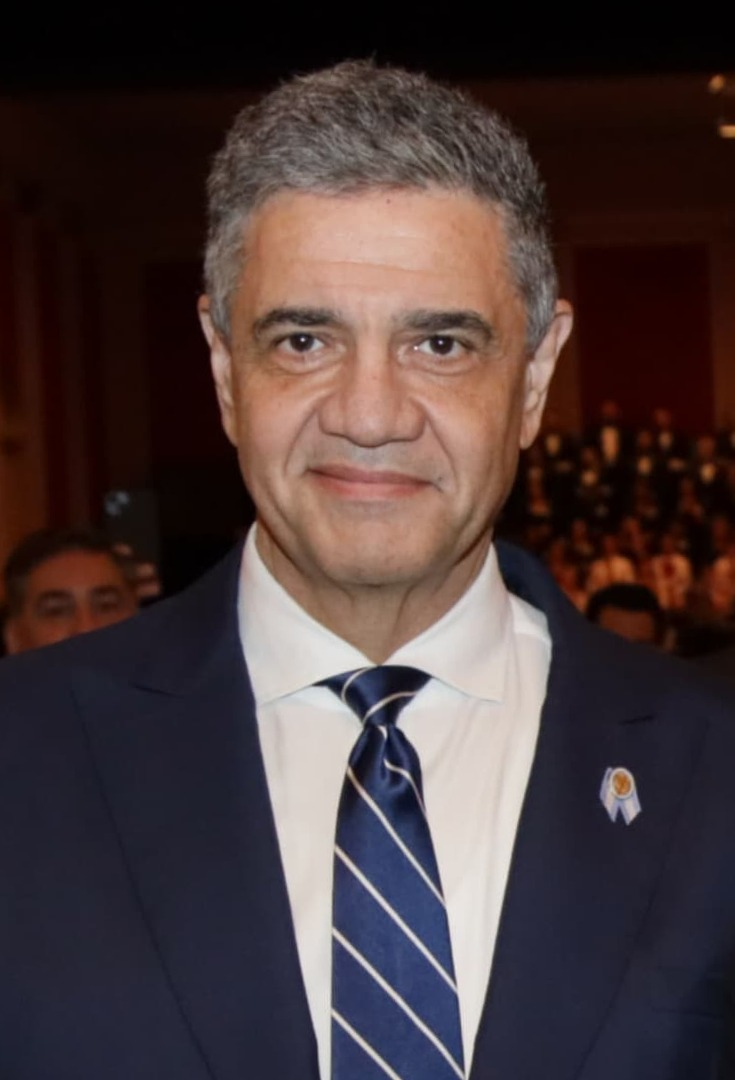
- Incumbent; Jorge Macri since 10 December 2023
- Style: No courtesy, title or style
- Residence: Buenos Aires City Hall
- Appointer: Citizens of Buenos Aires
- Term length: 4 years (renewable)
- Inaugural holder: Torcuato de Alvear (mayor); Fernando de la Rúa (chief)
- Formation: 10 May 1883 (mayor); 6 August 1996 (chief)
- Website: www.buenosaires.gob.ar

This is a list of mayors and chiefs of government of the city of Buenos Aires, capital of Argentina, since its federalization in 1880.

== History ==
Ever since the federalization of Buenos Aires in 1880, during the government of President Nicolás Avellaneda, the city of Buenos Aires – federal capital of Argentina – became a separate entity from Buenos Aires Province, operating as a non-autonomous city directly dependent on the government of Argentina. The Mayor of Buenos Aires (intendente) was from that point on appointed directly by the President of Argentina, while the city's Deliberative Council (Concejo Deliberante) served as the only democratically elected local authority. The first mayor (Spanish: Intendente) of the City of Buenos Aires was Torcuato de Alvear, who was appointed by President Julio Argentino Roca following the city's federalization in 1880.

In the 1990s during the presidency of Carlos Menem, calls for Buenos Aires to become politically autonomous grew, and the issue was one of the main points of the 1993 Pact of Olivos, which led to the 1994 amendment of the Constitution of Argentina. The 1994 amendments (specifically article 129 of the new constitution) granted autonomy to the city, with the appointed mayor replaced by an elected chief of government. The capital thus had the right to elect its chief executive for the first time. In popular usage, especially outside of Argentina, the chief is still often called mayor.

The 1996 elections in Buenos Aires were the first held in the city's history to elect local authorities, following the 1994 amendment of the Constitution of Argentina which granted autonomy to the city and allowed it to vote for its own head of government and legislature. The election resulted saw Radical Civic Union senator Fernando de la Rúa become the city's first democratically elected chief of government, and the FREPASO coalition of progressive and left-leaning parties become the largest bloc in the Constitutional Convention, which was tasked with writing and adopting a new Constitution for the newly-autonomous city.

== Mayors (1883–1996) ==
The party of the mayor reflects party registration, as opposed to the party lines run under during the general election.

No.	Portrait	Name (Birth–Death)	Term	Party	Appointed by	Previous office
1		Torcuato de Alvear (1822–1890)	10 May 1883 – 10 May 1887	National Autonomist Party	Julio Argentino Roca	President of the Buenos Aires Municipal Commission
2		Antonio F. Crespo (1851–1893)	14 May 1887 – 14 August 1888	Independent	Miguel Juárez Celman	National Deputy for Entre Ríos (1884–1887)
3		Guillermo Cranwell (1841–1909)	14 August 1888 – 10 May 1889	National Autonomist Party	Miguel Juárez Celman	President of the Deliberative Council
4		Francisco Seeber (1841–1913)	10 May 1889 – 4 June 1890	National Autonomist Party	Miguel Juárez Celman	Businessman
5		Francisco P. Bollini (1845–1921)	22 June 1890 – 31 October 1892	National Autonomist Party	Miguel Juárez Celman	Vice President of the Deliberative Council
6 interim		Juan José Montes de Oca	31 October 1892 – 7 November 1892	National Autonomist Party	Carlos Pellegrini	President of the Deliberative Council
7		Miguel Cané (1851–1905)	7 November 1892 – 7 June 1893	National Autonomist Party	Carlos Pellegrini	National Deputy for the Federal Capital (1880–1884)
8		Federico Pinedo (1855–1929)	20 June 1893 – 20 August 1894	National Autonomist Party	Luis Sáenz Peña	Director of the National Bank (1891–1893)
9		Emilio Bunge (1837–1909)	20 August 1894 – 12 September 1896	National Autonomist Party	Luis Sáenz Peña	Businessman
10		Francisco Alcobendas (1838–1911)	12 September 1896 – 14 September 1898	National Autonomist Party	José Evaristo Uriburu	President of the National Chamber of Deputies (1893–1896)
11 interim		Martín Biedma (1847–1909)	14 September 1898 – 20 October 1898	National Autonomist Party	José Evaristo Uriburu	President of the Deliberative Council
12		Adolfo Bullrich (1833–1904)	20 October 1898 – 20 October 1902	National Autonomist Party	Julio Argentino Roca	Director of Banco Hipotecario
13		Alberto Casares (1855–1906)	20 October 1902 – 20 October 1904	National Autonomist Party	Julio Argentino Roca	General Intendant of the Argentine Navy (1898–1902)
14		Carlos Roseti	20 October 1904 – 16 March 1906	National Autonomist Party	Manuel Quintana	
15 interim		Manuel Obarrio (1836–1918)	16 March 1906 – 22 March 1906	National Autonomist Party	José Figueroa Alcorta	President of the Municipal Commission (1901–1907)
16		Alberto Casares (1855–1906)	22 March 1906 – 9 November 1906	National Autonomist Party	José Figueroa Alcorta	Mayor of Buenos Aires (1904–1906)
17 interim		Manuel Obarrio (1836–1918)	9 November 1906 – 7 February 1907	National Autonomist Party	José Figueroa Alcorta	President of the Municipal Commission (1901–1907)
18		Carlos Torcuato de Alvear (1860–1931)	8 February 1907 – 7 January 1908	National Autonomist Party	José Figueroa Alcorta	Ambassador to Belgium
19		Manuel Güiraldes (1860–1931)	25 January 1908 – 12 October 1910	National Autonomist Party	José Figueroa Alcorta	President of the Sociedad Rural Argentina (1906–1908)
20		Joaquín Samuel de Anchorena (1876–1961)	20 October 1910 – 24 October 1914	National Autonomist Party	Roque Sáenz Peña	National Deputy for the Federal Capital (1906–1910)
21 interim		Enrique Palacio	26 October 1914 – 23 February 1915	National Autonomist Party	Victorino de la Plaza	President of the Deliberative Council
22		Arturo Gramajo (1860–1934)	23 February 1915 – 14 November 1916	National Autonomist Party	Victorino de la Plaza	Businessman
23		Joaquín Llambías (1868–1931)	14 November 1916 – 14 November 1919	Radical Civic Union	Hipólito Yrigoyen	President of the Argentine Medical Association (1915–1916)
24 interim		Saturnino García Anido	14 November 1919 – 3 December 1919	Radical Civic Union	Hipólito Yrigoyen	President of the Deliberative Council
25		José Luis Cantilo (1868–1931)	5 December 1919 – 25 October 1921	Radical Civic Union	Hipólito Yrigoyen	Interventor of Buenos Aires Province (1917–1918)
26		Juan Bartneche (1871–1922)	25 October 1921 – 13 October 1922	Radical Civic Union	Hipólito Yrigoyen	Member of the Deliberative Council
27 interim		Virgilio Tedín Uriburu (1879–1939)	13 October 1922 – 15 October 1922	Radical Civic Union	Marcelo T. de Alvear	Member of the Deliberative Council
28		Carlos Noel (1886–1941)	16 October 1922 – 3 May 1927	Radical Civic Union	Marcelo T. de Alvear	Ambassador to Chile
29		Horacio Casco (1868–1931)	3 May 1927 – 12 October 1928	Radical Civic Union	Marcelo T. de Alvear	President of the Deliberative Council
30 interim		Adrián Fernández Castro	12 October 1928 – 14 November 1928	Radical Civic Union	Hipólito Yrigoyen	President of the Deliberative Council
31		José Luis Cantilo (1868–1931)	15 November 1928 – 6 September 1930	Radical Civic Union	Hipólito Yrigoyen	Mayor of Buenos Aires (1919–1921)
32		José Guerrico (1863–1933)	6 September 1930 – 20 February 1932	Independent	José Félix Uriburu (Note: De facto president.)	Businessman
33		Rómulo Naón (1875–1941)	20 February 1932 – 19 September 1932	Radical Civic Union	Agustín P. Justo	Ambassador to the United States
34		Mariano de Vedia y Mitre (1880–1958)	19 September 1932 – 19 February 1938	National Democratic Party	Agustín P. Justo	Judge of the Court of Appeals
35		Arturo Goyeneche (1877–1940)	19 February 1938 – 26 November 1940	Radical Civic Union	Roberto M. Ortiz	President of the National Chamber of Deputies (1919–1922)
36 interim		Raúl Savarese	26 November 1940 – 6 December 1940	Radical Civic Union	Roberto M. Ortiz	President of the Deliberative Council
37		Carlos Alberto Pueyrredón (1887–1962)	6 December 1940 – 11 June 1943	National Democratic Party	Roberto M. Ortiz	National Deputy for Buenos Aires Province (1932–1936)
38 interim		Ernesto Padilla (1873–1951)	12 June 1943 – 17 June 1943	National Democratic Party	Pedro Pablo Ramírez	Minister of Justice and Public Instruction (1930–1931)
39		Basilio Pertiné (1879–1963)	17 June 1943 – 5 April 1944	Independent	Pedro Pablo Ramírez	Minister of War (1936–1938)
40		César R. Caccia (1900–1952)	12 April 1944 – 3 June 1946	Independent	Edelmiro Farrell	Secretary of the Mayorship (1943–1944)
41		Emilio Siri (1882–1976)	6 June 1946 – 16 November 1949	Peronist Party	Juan Perón	Mayor of Mercedes (1926–1930)
42		Juan Debenedetti (1873–?)	26 November 1949 – 19 February 1952	Peronist Party	Juan Perón	Undersecretary of Public Works (1946–1949)
43		Jorge Sabaté (1887–1991)	20 February 1952 – 26 October 1954	Peronist Party	Juan Perón	Architect
44		Bernardo Gago	26 October 1954 – 23 September 1955	Peronist Party	Juan Perón	National Deputy for Buenos Aires Province (1952–1954)
45		Miguel A. Madero	26 September 1955 – 8 June 1956	Independent	Pedro Eugenio Aramburu	Architect
46		Luis María de la Torre Campos (1890–1975)	8 June 1956 – 25 January 1957	Democratic Progressive Party	Pedro Eugenio Aramburu	Architect
47 interim		Eduardo H. Bergalli	26 January 1957 – 18 September 1957	Radical Civic Union	Pedro Eugenio Aramburu	
48		Ernesto Florit (1889–1968)	18 September 1957 – 1 May 1958	Independent	Pedro Eugenio Aramburu	Director of the National Military College (1936–1943)
49 interim		Roberto Etchepareborda (1923–1985)	1 May 1958 – 13 May 1958	Intransigent Radical Civic Union	Arturo Frondizi	President of the Deliberative Council
50		Hernán Giralt (1910–1965)	13 May 1958 – 25 June 1962	Intransigent Radical Civic Union	Arturo Frondizi	Architect
51		Alberto Prebisch (1899–1970)	26 June 1962 – 12 October 1963	Intransigent Radical Civic Union	José María Guido	Architect
52 interim		Pedro Carlos Riú (1912–1984)	12 October 1963 – 15 October 1963	People's Radical Civic Union	Arturo Illia	President of the Deliberative Council
53		Francisco Rabanal (1906–1982)	15 October 1963 – 28 June 1966	People's Radical Civic Union	Arturo Illia	National Deputy for the Federal Capital (1960–1962)
54		Eugenio Schettini (1913–1991)	6 July 1966 – 6 September 1967	Independent	Juan Carlos Onganía	Director of the National Military College (1958–1959)
55		Manuel Iricíbar (1916–1989)	8 September 1967 – 1 March 1971	Independent	Juan Carlos Onganía	Military commander
56 interim		Tomás José Caballero	1 March 1971 – 16 March 1971	Independent	Roberto Marcelo Levingston	Interventor of Mendoza Province (1966)
57		Saturnino Montero Ruiz (1916–2001)	31 March 1971 – 25 May 1973	Independent	Alejandro Lanusse	President of the City Bank (1966–1971)
58 interim		Leopoldo Frenkel (born 1947)	4 June 1973 – 6 August 1973	Justicialist Party	Héctor J. Cámpora	Lawyer
59 interim		Juan Debenedetti (1873–?)	7 August 1973 – 27 August 1973	Justicialist Party	Raúl Lastiri	Mayor of Buenos Aires (1949–1952)
60		José Embrioni (1906–1996)	30 August 1973 – 23 March 1976	Justicialist Party	Raúl Lastiri	Military commander
61 interim		Eduardo A. Crespi	24 March 1976 – 2 April 1976	Independent	Military Junta	Military commander
62		Osvaldo Cacciatore (1924–2007)	2 April 1976 – 31 March 1982	Independent	Jorge Rafael Videla	Chief of the Joint Chiefs of Staff (1972–1973)
63		Guillermo del Cioppo (1930–2004)	31 March 1982 – 10 December 1983	Independent	Leopoldo Galtieri	Chair of the Municipal Housing Commission
64		Julio César Saguier (1935–1987)	10 December 1983 – 13 January 1987	Radical Civic Union	Raúl Alfonsín	Member of the Deliberative Council (1973–1976)
64		Facundo Suárez Lastra (born 1954)	14 January 1987 – 8 July 1989	Radical Civic Union	Raúl Alfonsín	Secretary of the Interior (1986–1987)
65		Carlos Grosso (born 1943)	8 July 1989 – 26 October 1992	Justicialist Party	Carlos Menem	President of the Buenos Aires Justicialist Party
66		Saúl Bouer (1937–2017)	26 October 1992 – 5 September 1994	Justicialist Party	Carlos Menem	Economist
67		Jorge Domínguez (1945–2022)	5 September 1994 – 6 August 1996	Justicialist Party	Carlos Menem	National Deputy for the Federal Capital (1989–1991)

== Chiefs of government (1996–present) ==
The Chief of Government of the City of Buenos Aires constitutes the executive branch leadership of the Autonomous City of Buenos Aires, established in 1996 following the city's constitutional declaration of autonomy. The Chief of Government is directly elected by popular vote for a four-year term, with the possibility of one consecutive re-election. The office includes a Deputy Chief of Government, elected on the same ticket, who assumes temporary executive authority during the leader's absence or permanently in case of vacancy.

=== Limitations on the autonomy of the city ===
Because the City of Buenos Aires is not a province, but rather enjoys a regime of autonomy guaranteed by the National Constitution, there are divergences, both in the political and legal world, about the scope and limits of that autonomy. It is the National Congress that is responsible for specifying the limitations of Buenos Aires autonomy.

This has been carried out by Law No. 24,588 of 1996, known as Cafiero Law. Among the limitations established by the Cafiero Law are various judicial jurisdictions (civil, criminal, labor, commercial), the security police, various areas of transportation, powers regarding labor policy, the port area, etc. These limitations have generated complaints from various Buenos Aires political sectors and in general, Buenos Aires residents and citizens of the rest of the provinces have considerably different points of view on the limitations on the autonomy of Buenos Aires, especially in budgetary matters, that is, where the funds should come from to sustain these activities.

=== List of Chiefs of Government ===
#		Portrait	Name (Birth–Death)	Term of office		Elections	Political party (Coalition)	Deputy Chief (s)
	1		Fernando de la Rúa (1937–2019)	6 August 1996	10 December 1999	1996	Radical Civic Union (Alliance)	Enrique Olivera
	2		Enrique Olivera (1940–2014)	10 December 1999	5 August 2000	1996	Radical Civic Union (Alliance)	vacant
	3		Aníbal Ibarra (born 1958)	6 August 2000	7 March 2006	2000	Broad Front (Frepaso)	Cecilia Felgueras
	3		Aníbal Ibarra (born 1958)	6 August 2000	7 March 2006	2003	Broad Front (Frepaso)	Jorge Telerman
	4		Jorge Telerman (born 1956)	7 March 2006	10 December 2007	2003	Justicialist Party (Frepaso)	vacant
	5		Mauricio Macri (born 1959)	10 December 2007	10 December 2015	2007	Republican Proposal (Cambiemos)	Gabriela Michetti
	5		Mauricio Macri (born 1959)	10 December 2007	10 December 2015	2011	Republican Proposal (Cambiemos)	María Eugenia Vidal
	6		Horacio Rodríguez Larreta (born 1965)	10 December 2015	10 December 2023	2015	Republican Proposal (Juntos por el Cambio)	Diego Santilli (until 21 July 2021)
	6		Horacio Rodríguez Larreta (born 1965)	10 December 2015	10 December 2023	2019	Republican Proposal (Juntos por el Cambio)	Diego Santilli (until 21 July 2021)
	7		Jorge Macri (born 1965)	10 December 2023	Incumbent	2023	Republican Proposal (Juntos por el Cambio)	Clara Muzzio

== See also ==
- Politics of Argentina
- Autonomous City of Buenos Aires
- Federalization of Buenos Aires
