= Self-determination and Freedom =

Political party in Argentina

Self-determination and Freedom Autodeterminación y Libertad
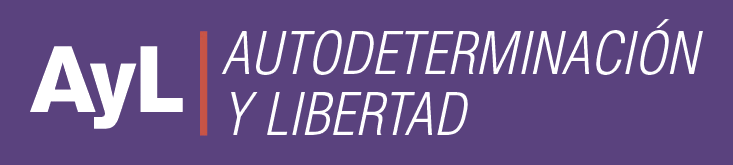
- Abbreviation: AyL
- Leader: Luis Zamora
- President: Fernando Vilardo
- Secretary-General: José Gerardo Romagnoli
- Founder: Luis Zamora
- Founded: March 2001
- Split from: Movimiento al Socialismo
- Headquarters: Ayacucho 457 6° 63, Buenos Aires
- Youth wing: Juventud Autodeterminación y Libertad
- Membership (2016): 3,796
- Ideology: Socialism; Libertarian Marxism; Anti-capitalism; Anti-imperialism
- Political position: Left-wing
- Colours: Red & purple
- Slogan: Decidimos o seguirán decidiendo por nosotros
- Seats in the Buenos Aires City Legislature: 0 / 60

Website
- www.aylibertad.com.ar/

Self-determination and Freedom (Spanish: Autodeterminación y Libertad, AyL) is a leftist political party in Argentina, with Luis Zamora as its most prominent member.

Many of its leading members were part of the Trotskyist Movement for Socialism (Spanish: Movimiento Al Socialismo or MAS) active in the 1980s and one of the more successful of its many splinter groups, the Socialist Workers' Party.

Luis Zamora and José Roselli were elected as National Deputies for AyL in the 2001 elections with 10% of the votes in Buenos Aires, a record for a party of the hard left. Roselli was ejected from the Party the following year. In 2003, the party was particularly successful in the elections to the Buenos Aires city legislature, gaining eight seats. However, all but one, Zamora's then wife Noemí Oliveto, soon defected. Zamora left Congress in 2005.
