= Republican Proposal =

Political party in Argentina

Republican Proposal Propuesta Republicana
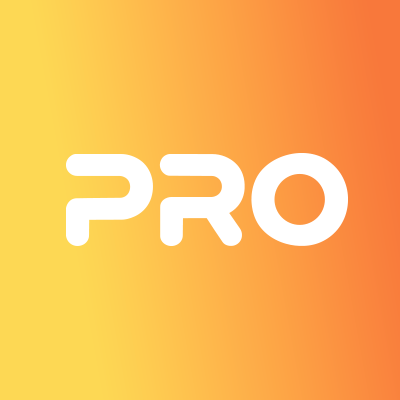
- Abbreviation: PRO
- President: Mauricio Macri
- Secretary General: Eduardo Macchiavelli
- Chamber Leader: Cristian Ritondo
- Senate Leader: Humberto Schiavoni
- Founded: 23 October 2005 (alliance); 3 June 2010 (party)
- Merger of: Commitment to Change and Recreate for Growth
- Headquarters: Balcarce 412, Buenos Aires
- Think tank: Pensar Foundation
- Student wing: PRO Universities
- Youth wing: PRO Youth
- Membership (2017): ▲115,481 (2016)
- Ideology: Conservative liberalism Liberal conservatism
- Political position: Centre-right
- National affiliation: La Libertad Avanza (since 2025)
- International affiliation: International Democracy Union
- Regional affiliation: Union of Latin American Parties
- Colors: Yellow
- Seats in the Chamber: 12 / 257
- Seats in the Senate: 3 / 72
- Province Governors: 3 / 24

Website
- www.pro.com.ar

Republican Proposal (Spanish: Propuesta Republicana), usually referred to by its abbreviation PRO, is a political party in Argentina. PRO was formed as an electoral alliance in 2005, but was transformed into a national party in 2010. It is led by former Argentine president Mauricio Macri, who has been the party's president since May 2024.

PRO has governed the city of Buenos Aires since 2007 and formed Cambiemos with the Radical Civic Union and the Civic Coalition ARI with which they won the 2015 general election.

Macri re-opened Argentina to international markets by lifting currency controls, restructuring sovereign debt, and pressing free-market solutions.

== History ==
=== Opposition ===
PRO began as an alliance between Commitment to Change (CPC) of Mauricio Macri, and Recreate for Growth (Recrear) of Ricardo López Murphy created in 2005.

At the 2005 legislative elections, the alliance won nine of the 127 deputies up for election.

Other provincial centre-right parties united within PRO. Macri and López Murphy spoke with Governor Jorge Sobisch, leader of the Neuquino People's Movement, but did not reach an alliance.

In the 2007 Argentine general election, PRO did not officially back a candidate but gave tacit support to the bid of López Murphy, who stood as the Recrear candidate. López Murphy did poorly, gaining just 1.45% of the vote. PRO and its allies stood in the congressional elections and won two swats in the Chamber of Deputies, and six seats overall.

In the June 2007 elections in the City of Buenos Aires, PRO decisively won the election, with Macri becoming Head of Government and the alliance taking 15 of the 30 seats in the city legislature. In addition to CpC and Recrear, the alliance included the Democratic Progressive Party, the Democratic Party, the Federal Party, the Movement for Integration and Development, the Popular Union and other neighborhood parties. Mauricio Macri formed an electoral alliance called Union-PRO with Francisco de Narváez, who was the candidate for Governor of Buenos Aires. He obtained third place with 15% of the vote.

For the 2009 legislative elections, De Narváez and Felipe Solá were the main candidates for national deputies for the Buenos Aires Province and defeated Nestor Kirchner.

In August 2009, Recreate for Growth gave up its formal independence and was completely absorbed by Republican Proposal. The political space Values for my Country became a monobloc in congress, detaching itself from the Republican Proposal

On 3 June 2010, the alliance became recognized as a national political party.

In the legislative elections of 28 June 2009, the PRO was presented with its own list with Gabriela Michetti in the City of Buenos Aires and in alliance with the Federal Peronism in the province of Buenos Aires. Unión PRO won 19.21% of the votes and third place nationally.

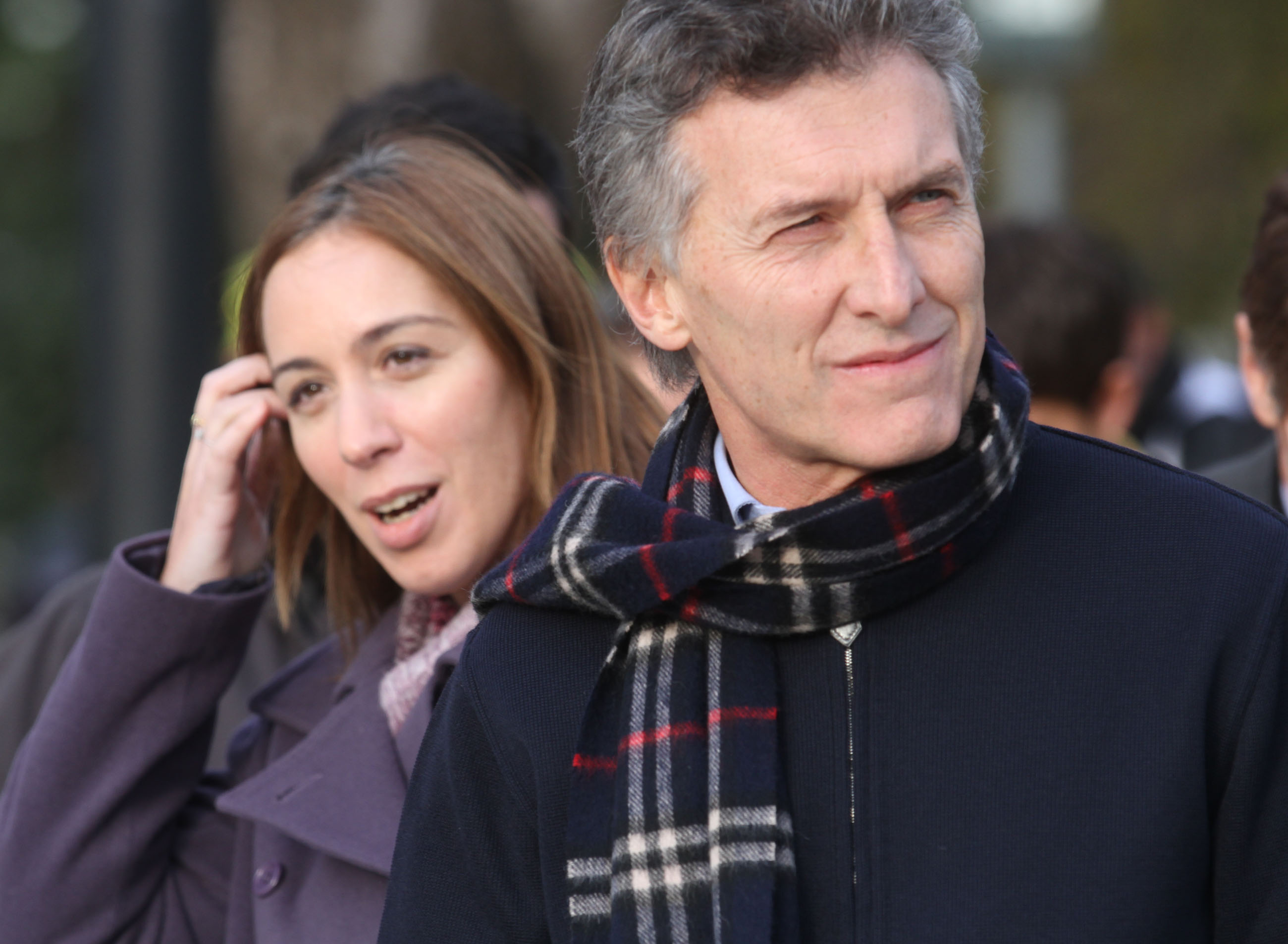
Macri was re-elected Mayor of Buenos Aires together with María Eugenia Vidal as Vice-Chief of the city.

In July 2011, PRO, in alliance with the Democratic Party and the Democratic Progressive Party, obtained a 46.1% vote in the City of Buenos Aires. In the second round on 31 July, he reached the victory and re-election of Macri as Chief of Government with 64.3% of the votes. That same year, Jorge Macri was elected first mayor of the conurbano through PRO in the October elections with 38.4% in Vicente López. In Santa Fe Province, Unión PRO Federal, headed by Miguel del Sel obtained 35.2% of the votes, but Bonfatti obtained the governorship with 38.7%.

For the 2013 legislative elections, PRO achieved an alliance with Union for All (later called Union for Freedom), a new classical liberal party led by Patricia Bullrich. It obtained legislative seats in the Córdoba Province, Entre Rios Province, La Pampa Province, Salta Province, San Juan Province, Santa Fe Province and in the City of Buenos Aires. PRO obtained 3 senators and 18 deputies.

=== Coalition ===
In June 2015, the Republican Proposal (PRO), Radical Civic Union and the ARI Civic Coalition formed Cambiemos, a big tent political coalition that proposes a change before the twelve years of government centre-left kirchnerists. Subsequently, joined the FE Party, Union for Freedom, the Popular Conservative Party and the Democratic Progressive Party.

These three parties nominated Mauricio Macri, Ernesto Sanz and Elisa Carrió as their representatives in the August 2015 primary elections, which were held to choose which candidate would run for the 2015 presidential election on 25 October. On 9 August 2015, Mauricio Macri was elected with 80.75% of the votes as the candidate who would represent Cambiemos in the presidential election.

On 25 October, he won second place with 34.15% and managed to enter the ballotage. On 22 November, he was elected President of Argentina with 51.34% of the votes after winning in the second round the Kirchnerist Daniel Scioli.

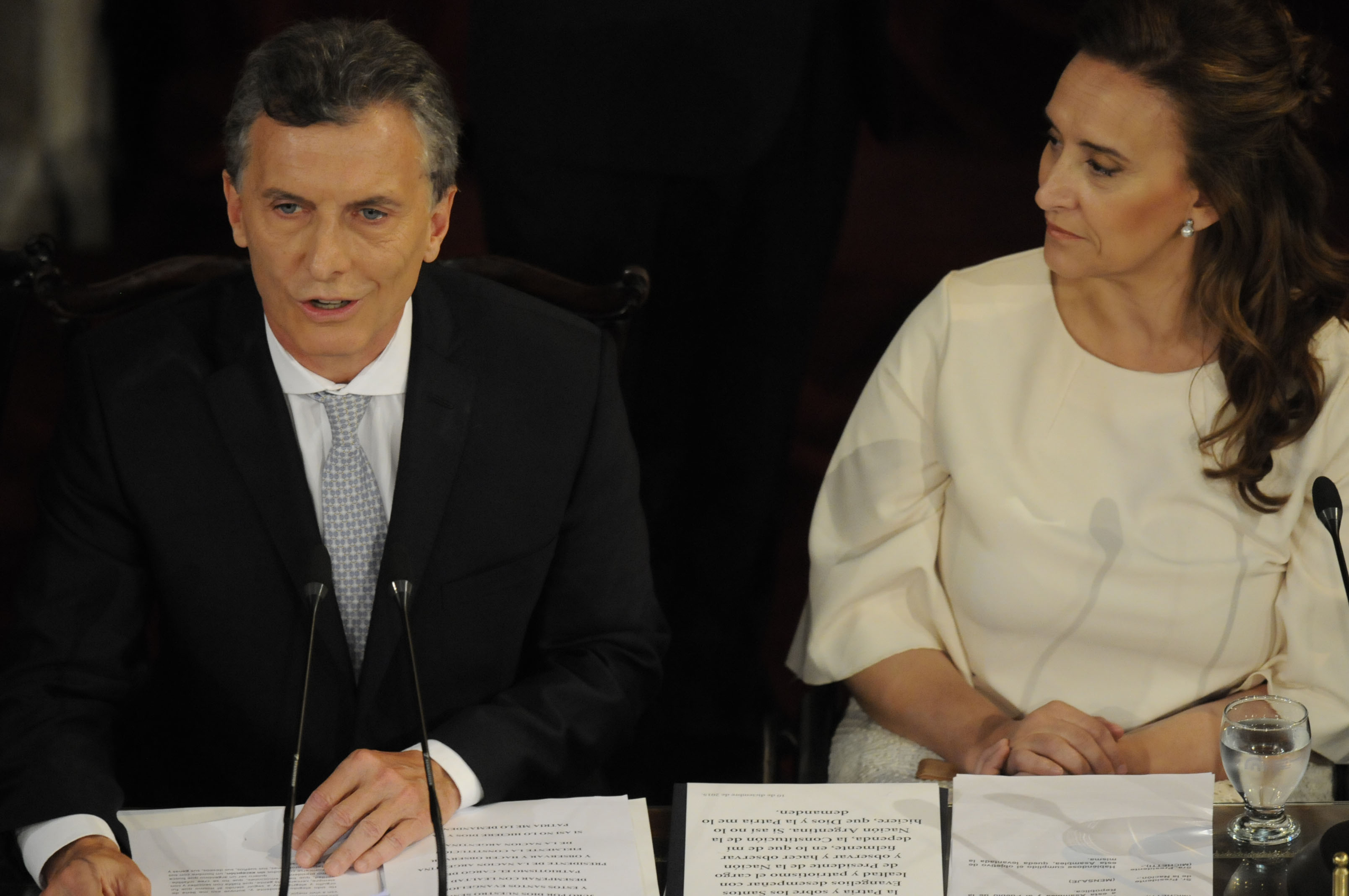
President Macri and Vicepresident Gabriela Michetti, in their Inauguration Ceremony in Argentine Parliament, on 10 December 2015

.

Horacio Rodríguez Larreta was elected Chief of Government of the City of Buenos Aires under another district coalition: Unión-PRO. María Eugenia Vidal (PRO) defeated Aníbal Fernández and became Governor of the Buenos Aires Province, putting an end to 28 years of Peronist control.

Republican Proposal joined the International Democracy Union on 17 January 2017.

In the legislative elections of 2017, Esteban Bullrich, member of Republican Proposal, obtained the first place and Cambiemos defeated the Citizen's Unity of the former Cristina Fernandez de Kirchner.

In March 2018, Union for Freedom, member of the Liberal International, agreed to its dissolution and integration into the PRO. This merger was approved by the PRO National Council and Patricia Bullrich joined the party.

In June 2019, an extension of the Cambiemos alliance was made: it is renamed Juntos por el Cambio, by adding to Federal Peronism led by Miguel Ángel Pichetto, who would share the presidential formula of space together with Mauricio Macri. In the 2019 presidential elections, JxC was in second place, with 40% of the votes, behind Fernández, who won first round with 48% of the votes.

In the province of Buenos Aires, Governor María Eugenia Vidal sought re-election but was defeated by the candidate of the Frente de Todos, Axel Kicillof, who won 52% of the votes against 38% obtained by JxC. In the city of Buenos Aires, Mayor Horacio Rodríguez Larreta joins the Radical Civic Union and the Socialist Party to the district alliance and is reelected as Chief of Government with 56% of the votes in the first round.

=== 2023 elections ===
Initially, Javier Milei invited Patricia Bullrich to run in an internal election in a brand new party that would define the candidate. Finally, the alliance did not materialize; and the PRO (within Juntos por el Cambio) presented two candidates for the primaries. One referenced in the "Hawks", the radical right wing, and more confrontational with the kirchnerism of the party, which was represented by Patricia Bullrich; and the other referenced in the "Doves", the more moderate and centre-right wing of the party, which was embodied by Horacio Rodríguez Larreta. In the end, Patricia Bullrich managed to overcome her dialoguing opponent, although she did not obtain enough percentage to qualify for the runoff. In which the hardest referents decided to support the ultraconservative libertarian Javier Milei, on the contrary the moderates remained neutral or even some supported the center-right peronist Sergio Massa. When the libertarian reached the presidency, he appointed several hard-line members of the PRO in his cabinet.

After the election Patricia Bullrich returned to government as security minister in president Javier Milei's Cabinet in December 2023. Bullrich also stated that she will step down both as the leader of Juntos por el Cambio and PRO party. As of 2024 Bullrich and Macri have different views on the future of PRO and its relation with La Libertad Avanza. Bullrich wants PRO to formally join LLA and create a stronger party, while Macri prefers to stay as an autonomous ally.

== Ideology ==
Despite its heterogeneity and post-ideological profile, PRO can be classified as a centre-right party close to the liberal-conservative tradition and the neoliberal paradigm. With analysts denoting the party's 3 main ideologies being conservatism, developmentalism, and economic liberalism. The party aims to revive the "spirit" of Arturo Frondizi, who was Argentine president of the Radical Civic Union between 1958 and 1962.

Fabián Bosoer, a political scientist who writes for Clarín, says PRO is "centre-right or republican liberal" party.

PRO's fundamental ties come from other centre-right parties. It sought alliances with parties like the Democratic Party.

PRO is affiliated with the International Democracy Union and has links with international networks of think tanks such as the Konrad Adenauer Foundation.

Mauricio Macri defined his own strength as "pro-market and pro-business".

Despite the majority of PRO members, they refuse to accept that their party be classified as "right-wing" for various reasons. In Argentina, only 20% of citizens recognize themselves as right-wing and PRO, like other modern parties, to seek where there is a greater number of potential votes, hoping to add voters to the centre without losing the support of those on the right-wing. A rejection to be placed in the field of the right-wing prevails, which in Argentina is strongly associated with authoritarianism. There is also a centrist faction led by Horacio Rodríguez Larreta.

=== Economic issues ===
PRO supports lower taxes, deregulation and free trade. Macri has expressed opposition to the nationalization of the country's airline and oil companies.

During Macri's presidency, he liberalized foreign exchange and exports and imports controls, cut some taxes and energy subsidies.

=== Social issues ===
Mauricio Macri has opposed LGBT rights during the 1990s but has evolved since then. In 2009, he declared to be in favor of same sex unions and that he was not appealing the ruling that enabled the marriage between two men in the City of Buenos Aires. Nevertheless, in 2010, the majority of national deputies of PRO voted against same-sex marriage, including Gabriela Michetti, who actively campaigned against it.

During Macri's presidency, when the PRO leader declared himself pro-life, most party members voted against legalizing abortion.

=== Foreign policy ===
Macri improved the relations with the United States and from Mercosur achieved a free trade agreement with the European Union and closer ties with the Pacific Alliance.

PRO and Cambiemos opposes strongly the regime of Nicolás Maduro in Venezuela for human rights abuses and calls for a restoration of democracy in the country.

During the first week in office, Macri annulled the Memorandum of understanding between Argentina and Iran, which would have established a joint investigation into the 1994 bombing with AMIA, a terrorist attack on a Jewish organization for which Argentina blamed Hezbollah and Iran.

== Young PRO ==
Jóvenes PRO is the young wing within this political party with had an ideology based on centrism, economic liberalism and developmentalism.

They are full members of the International Youth Democrat Union, a global association of conservative and center-right youth organizations since December 2013.

For many years, the youth wing was led by Marcos Peña, Chief of the Cabinet and one of the biggest referents of the PRO party.

In April 2018, leaders of the ruling party attended the First National Youth Meeting of Cambiemos. There Marcos Peña questioned "populism" and encouraged them to continue on the path of "collective construction".

When Javier Milei won the elections in 2023, the group decided to support him, and turned towards the far-right.

== Pensar Foundation ==
Fundación Pensar is a think tank that develops electoral strategies and public policies for the party.

In 2010, he was with Francisco Cabrera as president. The objective of the foundation was to design public policies and coordinate technical teams for a future national government of Mauricio Macri.

== PRO presidents ==
Name	Portrait	Vice President	Presidency start date	Presidency end date
Mauricio Macri		Gabriela Michetti	10 December 2015	10 December 2019

== Electoral history ==
=== Presidential elections ===
Election year	Candidate(s)	First round		Second round		Result	Note
Election year	Candidate(s)	# votes	% vote	# votes	% vote	Result	Note
2007	Ricardo López Murphy	273,015	1.43%			✗ Defeated	as Recreate for Growth
2015	Mauricio Macri	8,601,063	34.15%	12,997,938	51.34%	✓ Victory	as Cambiemos
2019	Mauricio Macri	10,470,607	40.37%			✗ Defeated	as Juntos por el Cambio
2023	Patricia Bullrich	6,379,023	23.81%			✗ Defeated	as Juntos por el Cambio

=== Congressional elections ===
==== Chamber of Deputies ====
Election year	votes	%	seats won	Total seats	Position	Presidency	Note
2005	1,046,020	7.55	9	9 / 257	Minority	Néstor Kirchner (FPV—PJ)	In opposition
2007	141,660	5.67	0	9 / 257	Minority	Néstor Kirchner (FPV—PJ)	In opposition
2009	3,391,391	19.21	11	20 / 257	Minority	Cristina Kirchner (FPV—PJ)	In opposition
2011	471,851	2.08	-8	11 / 257	Minority	Cristina Kirchner (FPV—PJ)	In opposition
2013	2,033,459	8.18	9	20 / 257	Minority	Cristina Kirchner (FPV—PJ)	In opposition
2015	8,601,063	34.15	21	41 / 257	Minority	Mauricio Macri (PRO)	In government
2017	10,161,053	41.76	14	55 / 257	Minority	Mauricio Macri (PRO)	In government
2019	10,347,402	40.36	-4	51 / 257	Minority	Alberto Fernández (FdT-PJ)	In opposition
2023	6,412,133 (Note: Total votes for Juntos por el Cambio)	26.12	-13	38 / 257	Minority	Javier Milei (LLA)	Confidence and support
2025	9,437,860 (Note: Total votes for La Libertad Avanza)	40.66	-26	12 / 257	Minority	Javier Milei (LLA)	Confidence and support

==== Senate elections ====
Election year	votes	%	seats won	Total seats	Position	Presidency	Note
2005	492,892	7.5	0	0 / 72	Minority	Néstor Kirchner (FPV—PJ)	In opposition
2007	20,077	5.67	0	0 / 72	Minority	Néstor Kirchner (FPV—PJ)	In opposition
2009	121,100	19.21	0	0 / 72	Minority	Cristina Kirchner (FPV—PJ)	In opposition
2011	55,023	2.08	0	0 / 72	Minority	Cristina Kirchner (FPV—PJ)	In opposition
2013	779,404	8.18	3	3 / 72	Minority	Cristina Kirchner (FPV—PJ)	In opposition
2015	8,601,063	34.15	5	6 / 72	Minority	Mauricio Macri (PRO)	In government
2017	4,802,632	41.01	1	7 / 72	Minority	Mauricio Macri (PRO)	In government
2019	2,363,432	41.94	1	8 / 72	Minority	Alberto Fernández (FdT-PJ)	In opposition
