= Movimiento al Socialismo (Argentina) =

Movement for Socialism Movimiento al Socialismo
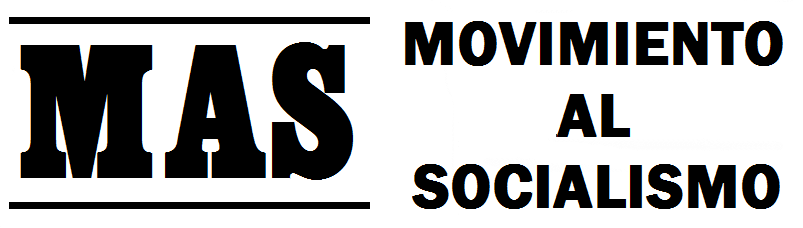
- Abbreviation: MAS
- Founded: 1982
- Dissolved: 2003
- Ideology: Communism; Trotskyism; Marxism; Anti-capitalism
- Political position: Left-wing

The Movement for Socialism (Spanish: Movimiento Al Socialismo, MAS) was a Trotskyist political party in Argentina. It was founded in 1982 and led by Nahuel Moreno until his death, in 1987. It dissolved in 2003.
