= 2025 Buenos Aires City elections =

- City Legislature
- 18 May 2025
- 30 out of 60 seats in the City Legislature
- Turnout: 53.38%
Party	Leader	Vote %	Seats	+/–
LLA	Manuel Adorni	30.70	11	+7
Es Ahora Buenos Aires	Leandro Santoro	27.89	10	0
Buenos Aires Primero	Silvia Lospennato	16.22	5	−10
Volvamos Buenos Aires	Horacio Rodríguez Larreta	8.24	3	+3
FIT – Unidad	Vanina Biasi	3.22	1	−1
This lists parties that won seats. See the complete results below.
Results by electoral circuit

The 2025 Buenos Aires City elections were held on 18 May 2025, to elect 30 seats in the Buenos Aires City Legislature.

La Libertad Avanza, leading the country through President Javier Milei, received 30.7% of the vote. More than double the party's vote share in 2023, it proved enough to defeat both Propuesta Republicana, the city's ruling party, and Es Ahora Buenos Aires, a Peronist coalition.

== Election schedule ==
The electoral process was conducted according to the timetable established by the Electoral Tribunal in Decree 91/GCBA/2025 on 25 February 2025.

Date	Event
March 19	Formation of alliances and start of the election campaign.
March 29	Closing of candidate lists for Legislature of the Autonomous City of Buenos Aires.
April 18	Dissemination of links enabling eligible voters to consult the electoral register and locate their polling station.
April 29	Debate between the leading candidates for Legislature of the Autonomous City of Buenos Aires.
May 11	Deadline for holding the election debate between candidates.
May 16	End of the election campaign. Start of the election restrictions.
May 18	Local legislative elections
May 20	Start of final vote counting.
June 2	Deadline for publication of the final vote count.

== Alliances ==
Several electoral alliances were registered ahead of the 18 May elections:

- Buenos Aires Primero—the governing alliance in the city—nominated Silvia Lospennato as its lead candidate. The coalition includes Propuesta Republicana (PRO) and Encuentro Republicano Federal, among other parties.
- Es Ahora Buenos Aires—whose lead candidate was Leandro Santoro—was formed by the Justicialist Party, Frente Patria Grande, Kolina, and other parties that joined the Unión por la Patria coalition in 2023.
- Let’s Return to Buenos Aires nominated former head of the city government Horacio Rodríguez Larreta as its lead legislative candidate; the coalition comprised Confianza Pública and the Federal Party.
- Evolution, formed by the Unión Cívica Radical (UCR), Generación para un Encuentro Nacional (GEN), and the Socialist Party.
- Unión Porteña Libertaria—whose lead candidate was Yamil Santoro—was formed by the Libertarian Party and the Christian Democratic Party.
- Left and Workers’ Front – Unity (FIT-U) fielded Vanina Biasi (Workers’ Party, PO) and Luca Bonfante (Socialist Workers’ Party, PTS), among others; the coalition comprises the Workers’ Party (PO), Socialist Workers’ Party (PTS), Socialist Workers’ Movement (MST), and Socialist Left.
- Principles and Values nominated businessman Alejandro Kim as its lead legislative candidate; the alliance comprised the eponymous party and the Retirees and Youth Movement.
- Confluence for Equality and Sovereignty presented María Eva Koutsovitis, an engineer and teacher, as its lead candidate; the alliance comprised the Electoral Instrument for Popular Unity, the Communist Party, and Popular Left.

Nine parties contested independently, without forming alliances:

- ARI Civic Coalition ran independently, with Paula Oliveto as its lead candidate.
- La Libertad Avanza, the national governing party, ran independently with Manuel Adorni as its lead candidate.
- Let’s Be Free ran independently after the Evita Movement left the Es Ahora Buenos Aires coalition that nominated Leandro Santoro, fielding Juan Manuel Abal Medina as its candidate.
- Movimiento de Integración y Desarrollo (MID) initially planned to ally with Buenos Aires Primero but subsequently registered its own list, nominating Ricardo Caruso Lombardi for the legislature.
- Unión del Centro Democrático nominated Ramiro Marra as its lead legislative candidate; Marra sought reelection following his departure from La Libertad Avanza in early 2025.
- The Left in the City nominated teacher and activist Federico Winokur as its lead legislative candidate.
- Federal Patriotic Front nominated its secretary general, lawyer César Biondini—son of party president Alejandro Biondini—as its lead candidate.
- Movimiento Plural nominated pharmacist and trade unionist Marcelo Peretta, director of the Argentine Union of Pharmacists and Biochemists, as its lead candidate.
- El Movimiento nominated Mila Zurbriggen, a nationalist activist and former member of La Libertad Avanza, as its lead candidate.

== Results ==
Party	Votes	%	Seats
La Libertad Avanza	495,966	30.70	11
Es Ahora Buenos Aires	450,559	27.89	10
Buenos Aires Primero	262,027	16.22	5
Volvamos Buenos Aires	133,108	8.24	3
Workers' Left Front	52,031	3.22	1
Union of the Democratic Centre	43,097	2.67	–
Civic Coalition ARI	41,128	2.55	–
Evolución	38,054	2.36	–
Principles and Values	33,430	2.07	–
Integration and Development Movement	27,544	1.71	–
Unión Porteña Libertaria	10,320	0.64	–
Seamos Libres	8,360	0.52	–
La Izquierda en la Ciudad	6,320	0.39	–
Confluencia por la Igualdad y la Soberanía	5,448	0.34	–
El Movimiento	3,247	0.20	–
Patriot Front	2,592	0.16	–
Movimiento Plural	2,091	0.13	–
Total	1,615,322	100.00	30
Valid votes	1,615,322	97.98	
Invalid/blank votes	33,344	2.02	
Total votes	1,648,666	100.00	
Registered voters/turnout	3,088,750	53.38	

=== By comuna ===
	La Libertad Avanza Adorni		Es Ahora Buenos Aires Santoro		Buenos Aires Primero Lospennato		Volvamos Buenos Aires Larreta		Others		Total	Margin	
Commune	Votes	%	Votes	%	Votes	%	Votes	%	Votes	%	Total	Votes	%
Comuna 1	32.950	32,35	27.275	26,78	17.261	16,95	7.625	7,49	16.736	16,43	101.847	5.675	5,57
Comuna 2	32.032	38,01	14.116	16,75	19.003	22,55	6.075	7,21	13.053	15,49	84.279	17.916	21,26
Comuna 3	28.407	29,80	28.786	30,20	12.948	13,58	7.389	7,75	17.797	18,67	95.327	379	0,40
Comuna 4	29.653	27,14	36.136	33,07	14.590	13,35	9.287	8,50	19.601	17,94	109.267	6.483	5,93
Comuna 5	27.113	26,92	32.749	32,51	14.848	14,74	8.127	8,07	17.887	17,76	100.724	5.636	5,60
Comuna 6	31.181	28,87	30.468	28,21	19.184	17,76	8.653	8,01	18.533	17,16	108.019	713	0,66
Comuna 7	34.619	30,22	34.376	30,01	16.217	14,16	9.272	8,09	20.076	17,52	114.560	243	0,21
Comuna 8	24.822	27,26	32.339	35,52	9.340	10,26	8.192	9,00	16.364	17,97	91.057	7.517	8,26
Comuna 9	28.751	29,75	30.005	31,04	12.581	13,02	8.083	8,36	17.238	17,83	96.658	1.254	1,30
Comuna 10	29.277	29,91	28.992	29,62	13.848	14,15	8.293	8	17.481	17,86	97.891	285	0,29
Comuna 11	35.952	31,18	31.939	27,70	17.931	15,55	10.217	8,86	19.279	16,72	115.318	4.013	3,48
Comuna 12	39.049	30,58	34.348	26,90	22.145	17,34	11.487	9,00	20.658	16,18	127.687	4.701	3,68
Comuna 13	48.223	34,75	27.733	19,99	30.459	21,95	11.331	8,17	21.019	15,15	138.765	20.490	14,77
Comuna 14	45.017	35,40	26.303	20,69	26.681	20,98	10.036	7,89	19.112	15,03	127.149	18.714	14,72
Comuna 15	28.843	27,51	34.784	33,18	14.954	14,26	8.977	8,56	17.284	16,49	104.842	5.941	5,67
Prisoners	77	14,42	210	39,33	37	6,93	64	11,99	146	27,34	534	133	24,91
Total	495.966	30,70	450.559	27,89	262.027	16,22	133.108	8,24	273.662	16,94	1.615.322	45.407	2,81

== See also ==
- 2025 Argentine provincial elections
- 2025 Argentine legislative election
- 2025 Buenos Aires provincial election
