= 2023 Buenos Aires City elections =

- Mayoral election
← 2019	22 October 2023	2027 →
- Turnout: 64.16%
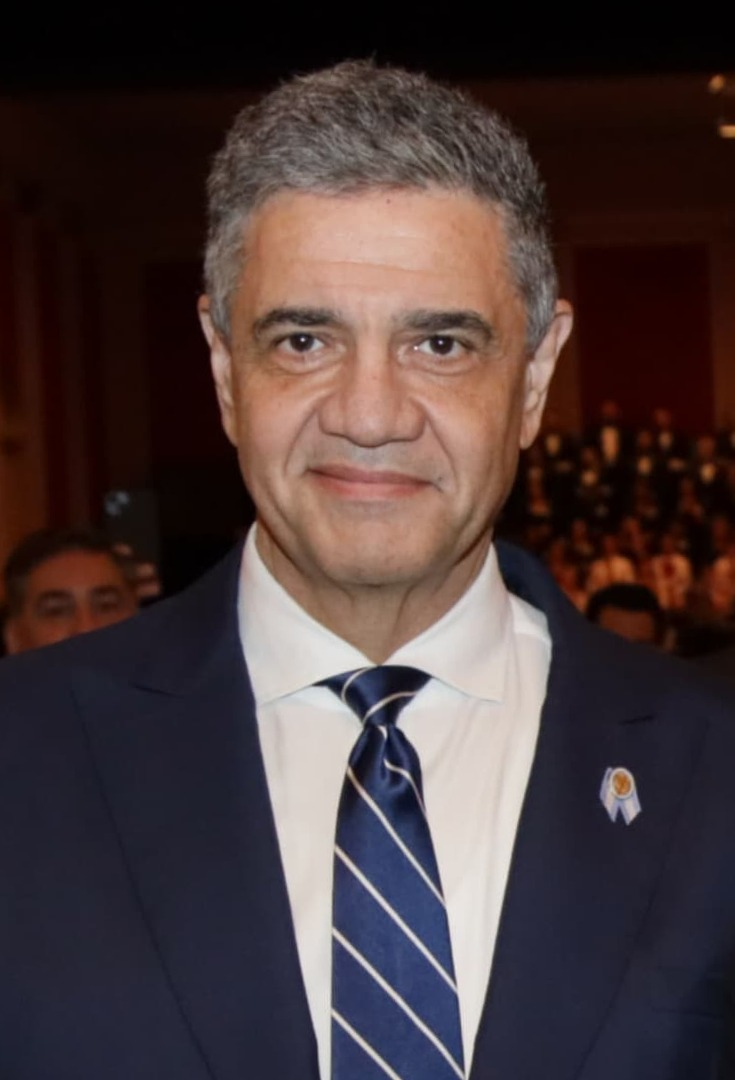

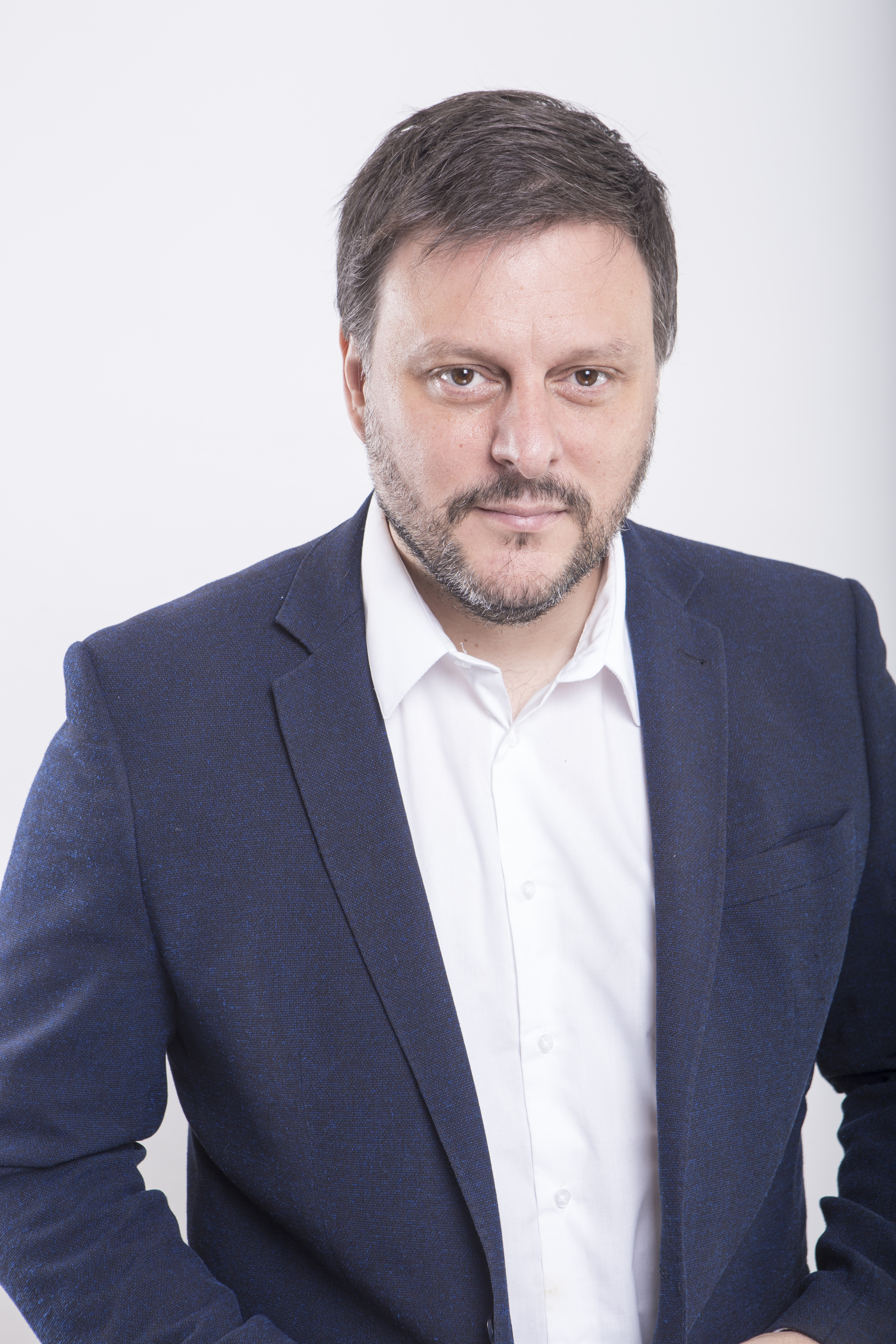

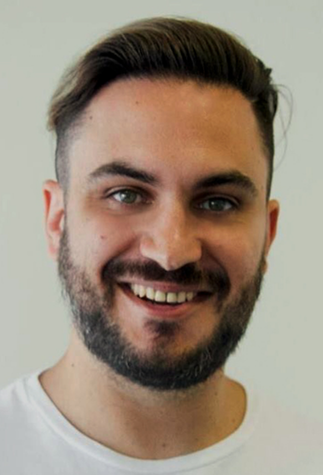

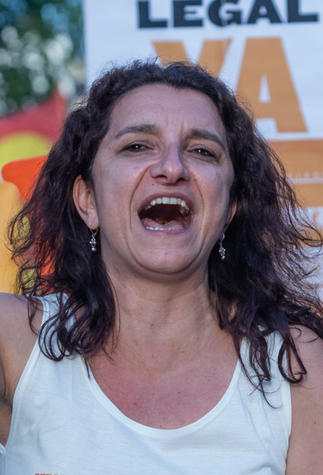
Nominee	Jorge Macri	Leandro Santoro
Party	PRO	MNA
Alliance	JxC	UP
Running mate	Clara Muzzio	Bárbara Rossen
Popular vote	895,131	581,450
Percentage	49.67%	32.27%
Nominee	Ramiro Marra	Vanina Biasi
Party	PL	Workers' Party
Alliance	LLA	FIT – Unidad
Running mate	Eduardo Martino	Jessica Gentile
Popular vote	248,263	77,077
Percentage	13.78%	4.28%
- Results of the Chief of Government election by electoral circuit. Darker shades indicate a higher vote share.
Chief of Government before election
Horacio Rodríguez Larreta
PRO–JxC
Elected Chief of Government
Jorge Macri
PRO–JxC
- City Legislature
← 2021	22 October 2023	2025 →
- 30 out of 60 seats in the City Legislature
- Turnout: 64.16%
Party	Leader	Vote %	Seats	+/–
JxC	Jorge Macri	49.73	15	0
UP	Leandro Santoro	31.13	10	+2
LLA	Ramiro Marra	13.91	4	−1
FIT – Unidad	Vanina Biasi	5.23	1	−1
This lists parties that won seats. See the complete results below.

General elections were held in the City of Buenos Aires on 22 October 2023, coinciding with the general election being held nationwide. The Chief of Government (mayor), half of the City Legislature and all 150 members of the communal boards were elected to four-year terms.

In the mayoral election, Jorge Macri, of the ruling PRO party, won in the first round of voting with 49.67% of the vote. According to the city's constitution, a candidate for Chief of Government must achieve over 50% of the vote in order to win in the first round, but the second-most voted candidate, Leandro Santoro of Union for the Homeland, dropped out of the race for the second round and ceded victory to Macri.

This was the seventh general election in the City of Buenos Aires since the adoption of the 1996 Constitution, which granted autonomy to the city and allowed it to vote for its own Chief of Government. It was also the second election in which the Single Electronic Ballot (Boleta Única Electrónica, BUE) voting system was implemented, after 2015.

== Background ==
The 2019 elections in Buenos Aires had resulted in the re-election of incumbent Chief of Government Horacio Rodríguez Larreta with a record 55.90% of the vote in the first round. Rodríguez Larreta's party, Republican Proposal (PRO) and its Juntos por el Cambio alliance also remained the largest force in the City Legislature.

On 13 April 2023, Rodríguez Larreta issued a decree making the 2023 elections in Buenos Aires concurrent with the national general election. Rodríguez Larreta was constitutionally barred from running for re-election a second time, and instead launched his presidential run.

This was the second election in which the Single Electronic Ballot (Boleta Única Electrónica, BUE) voting system was implemented, after 2015. It was, however, the first time the BUE system was implemented in a local election concurrent with a national election, which meant two different voting systems were used in the same election day.

== Candidates ==
Coalition	Mayoral candidate (party) Prior political experience	Vice mayoral candidate (party) Prior political experience	Parties
	Jorge Macri (PRO); Cabinet Chief (2021–2023); Mayor of Vicente López (2011–2021)	Clara Muzzio (PRO); Minister of Public Space and Urban Hygiene (2019–2023)	PRO; UCR; CC-ARI; PS; PDP; UCEDÉ; UNIR; GEN; PDC; PRF; ERF
	Leandro Santoro (MNA); National Deputy (2021–2023); City Legislator (2019–2021)	Bárbara Rossen (PJ)	PJ; FR; FPG; FG; PV; ND; Kolina; PI; CF; NE; PSOL; FORJA; PF; PC; PTP; PSA; SL
	Ramiro Marra (PL); City Legislator (2021–present)	Eduardo Martino (Ind.)	MID; UNITE; PD
	Vanina Biasi (PO)	Jessica Gentile (MST)	PO; PTS; MST; IS

== Opinion polling ==
Local regression of polls conducted.

Pollster/client(s)	Date(s) conducted	Sample size	Macri JxC	Santoro UP	Marra LLA	Biasi FIT-U	Others	Blank	Abst. Undec.	Lead
2023 city elections	22 Oct 2023	–	49.7	32.3	13.8	4.2	–	11	35.8	17.4
Circuitos	10-11 Oct 2023	1,129	44.5	23.1	21.9	2.9	–	3.1	4.5	21.4
Opina Argentina	6-10 Oct 2023	820	44	22	20	3	–	6	5	22
Proyección Consultores	5-10 Oct de 2023	1,287	47.5	26.7	19.4	2.8	–	–	3.6	20.8
Federico González & Asociados	28-30 Sep 2023	1,200	45.8	25.8	24.8	3.7	–	–	–	20
Federico González & Asociados	6-8 Sep 2023	1,000	46.7	23.0	22.7	4.0	–	3.3	7.5	23.7
Circuitos	24-26 Aug 2023	1,197	42.3	21.9	20.4	2.7	–	7.5	5-2	20.4
CB Consultora	22-24 Aug 2023	1,105	41.6	22.5	18	3.7	–	7	7.2	19.1
2023 primary elections	13 Aug 2023	–	55.9	22.1	12.9	3.6	2.5	2.7	37.5	33.7
Federico González & Asociados	31 Jul - 3 Aug 2023	1,000	47.9	24.4	19	3.8	0.6	4.3	9.9	23.5
Federico González & Asociados	17-19 Jul 2023	1,400	45.4	20.5	16.1	2.4	1	3.2	9.3	24.9
Circuitos	3-5 Jul 2023	1,177	49.6	16.9	15.7	2.3	7.4	8.1	-	32,7
Consultora Tendencias	2-5 Jun 2023	2,506	46.8	19.7	8.8	5.1	2.3	4.2	13.1	27.1
Federico González & Asociados	1-5 Jun 2023	1,400	36.7 (Note: With Martín Lousteau as JxC candidate for mayor)	20.7	24.5	1.4	1.4	5.4	9.9	12.2
Federico González & Asociados	1-5 Jun 2023	1,400	41 (Note: With Jorge Macri as JxC candidate for mayor)	21.3	22.1	1.4	1.3	4.3	8.6	18.9
Federico González & Asociados	29 Apr - 1 May 2023	1,400	48.1	20	15.4	0.6	1	3.6	10.4	28.1
Circuitos	26-28 Apr 2023	1,192	48.6	20.8	13.9	2.1	2.5	12.1	-	27.8
Federico González & Asociados	2-3 Apr 2023	800	42.5	20.2	18.7	3.1	5.2	2.6	7.7	22.3
Solmoirago	Mar 2023	400	55.3	20.9	9.9	3.1	-	-	10.8	34.4
Consultora Tendencias	13-18 Mar 2023	746	46.8	23.7	11.1	5.2	1.8	3.1	8.3	23.1
Circuitos	13-14 Mar 2023	1,196	49.5	21	12.9	6.1	-	10.5	-	28.5
Opina Argentina	25-27 Feb 2023	800	47	22	17	4	4	2	4	25
Federico González & Asociados	21-22 Feb 2023	800	42.4	20.5	19.1	4.2	3.1	3.1	7.6	21.9
Opinaia	5-17 Feb 2023	500	48	16	13	3	-	7	13	32
Circuitos	8-10 Feb 2023	1,184	47.1	21.2	14	5.4	-	12.3	-	25.9
Federico González & Asociados	15-16 Jan 2023	800	40.4	21.8	22.3	4.1	0.5	3.2	7.7	18.1
Opinaia	2-9 Jan 2023	510	46	14	12	4	-	4	18	32

== Results ==
=== Primaries ===
==== Mayoral primaries ====
Coalition	List	Mayoral candidate	Candidate votes		Overall votes	
Coalition	List	Mayoral candidate	Votes	%	Votes	%
Juntos por el Cambio	Vayamos por más	Jorge Macri	540,132	29.52	1,051,866	55.93
Juntos por el Cambio	Evolución	Martín Lousteau	511,734	27.97	1,051,866	55.93
Union for the Homeland	Alternativa para Ganar Buenos Aires	Leandro Santoro	416,919	22.17	416,919	22.17
La Libertad Avanza	La Ciudad Avanza	Ramiro Marra	243,202	12.93	243,202	12.93
Worker's Left Front-Unity	Unidad de Luchadores y la Izquierda	Vanina Biasi	45,608	2.49	68,670	3.65
Worker's Left Front-Unity	Unir y Fortalecer la Izquierda	Jorge Adaro	23.062	1.26	68,670	3.65
Principles and Values	Celeste y Blanca	Eduardo Graham	15,133	0.81	15,133	0.81
Workers' Policy	Unidad Obrera	Valentina Viglieca	8,800	0.47	8,800	0.47
Freemen of the South Movement	Alternativa Progresista	Adolfo Andrés Buzzo Pipet	7,250	0.39	7,250	0.39
The Left in the City	Izquierda Anticapitalista	Héctor Antonio Heberling	7,227	0.38	7,227	0.38
Renovating Aptitude	Primero los Porteños	Juan Pablo Chiesa	5,253	0.28	5,253	0.28
Patriot Front	Primero la Patria	Alejandro Gustavo Nizzero	5,206	0.28	5,206	0.28
Valid votes					1,829,526	100
Blank votes					51,053	2.71
Invalid votes					3,362	0.18
Total					1,883,941	97.29
Registered voters/turnout					3,014,213	62.50

=== Chief of Government ===
Candidate	Running mate	Party	Votes	%
Jorge Macri	Clara Muzzio	Juntos por el Cambio	895,131	49.68
Leandro Santoro	Bárbara Rossen	Union for the Homeland	581,450	32.27
Ramiro Marra	Eduardo Martino	La Libertad Avanza	248,263	13.78
Vanina Biasi	Jessica Gentile	Workers' Left Front	77,077	4.28
Total			1,801,921	100.00
Valid votes			1,801,921	88.39
Invalid votes			14,335	0.70
Blank votes			222,383	10.91
Total votes			2,038,639	100.00
Registered voters/turnout			3,177,558	64.16

==== Results by commune ====
Results of the Chief of Government election by commune

Communes won by Macri
Communes won by Santoro

Commune	Macri (JxC)		Santoro (UP)		Marra (LLA)		Biasi (FIT-U)		Total votes
Commune	Votes	%	Votes	%	Votes	%	Votes	%	Total votes
Comuna 1	55,979	47.37	37,633	31.84	19,274	16.31	5,292	4.48	118,178
Comuna 2	63,506	65.96	18,584	19.30	11,742	12.19	2,453	2.55	96,285
Comuna 3	46,281	43.74	37,132	35.10	17,210	16.27	5,175	4.89	105,798
Comuna 4	48,509	39.19	48,558	39.23	19,931	16.11	6,773	5.47	123,771
Comuna 5	50,599	45.42	41,297	37.07	14,133	12.69	5,364	4.82	111,393
Comuna 6	61,774	52.33	38,407	32.53	13,024	11.03	4,851	4.11	118,056
Comuna 7	56,101	44.30	44,880	35.44	19,797	15.63	5,848	4.62	126,626
Comuna 8	33,998	33.07	43,089	41.91	20,319	19.76	5,406	5.26	102,812
Comuna 9	45,488	42.59	38,449	35.99	17,580	16.46	5,301	4.96	106,818
Comuna 10	50,715	47.34	36,228	33.82	14,988	13.99	5,191	4.85	107.122
Comuna 11	64,030	51.05	39,921	31.83	16,272	12.98	5,191	4.14	125,417
Comuna 12	75,285	54.04	42,374	30.42	16,125	11.58	5,523	3.96	139,307
Comuna 13	98,201	63.09	35,702	22.94	17,009	10.93	4,740	3.04	155,652
Comuna 14	90,686	62.05	34,355	23.51	16,763	11.47	4.341	2.97	146,145
Comuna 15	53,826	45.81	44,130	37.56	13,987	11.90	5,559	4.73	117,502
Prisons	153	14.73	711	68.43	109	10.49	66	6.35	1,039
Total	895,131	49.67	581,450	32.27	248,263	13.78	77,077	4.28	1,801,921

=== Legislature ===
Distribution of seats in the City Legislature following the 2023 election: Union for the Homeland (18) Vamos por más (15) – ran as JxC La Libertad Avanza (9) UCR–Evolution (8) – ran as JxC Public Trust (3) – ran as JxC Liberal Republican Front (2) – ran as JxC Socialist Party (1) – ran as JxC PO–FIT-U (1) PTS–FIT-U (1) MST–FIT-U (1) United Republicans (1) – ran as JxC

Party	Votes	%	Seats	
Party	Votes	%	Won	Total
Juntos por el Cambio	890,976	49.73	15	30
Union for the Homeland	557,808	31.13	10	18
La Libertad Avanza	249,170	13.91	4	9
Workers' Left Front – Unity	93,759	5.23	1	3
Total	1,791,713	100.00	30	60
Valid votes	1,791,713	87.89		
Invalid votes	14,147	0.69		
Blank votes	232,779	11.42		
Total votes	2,038,639	100.00		
Registered voters/turnout	3,177,558	64.16		

== See also ==
- 2023 Argentine general election
- 2023 Argentine provincial elections
- 2023 Buenos Aires provincial election
