= 2019 Buenos Aires City elections =

- Mayoral election
| ← 2015 | 27 October 2019 | 2023 → |
- Turnout: 79.78%
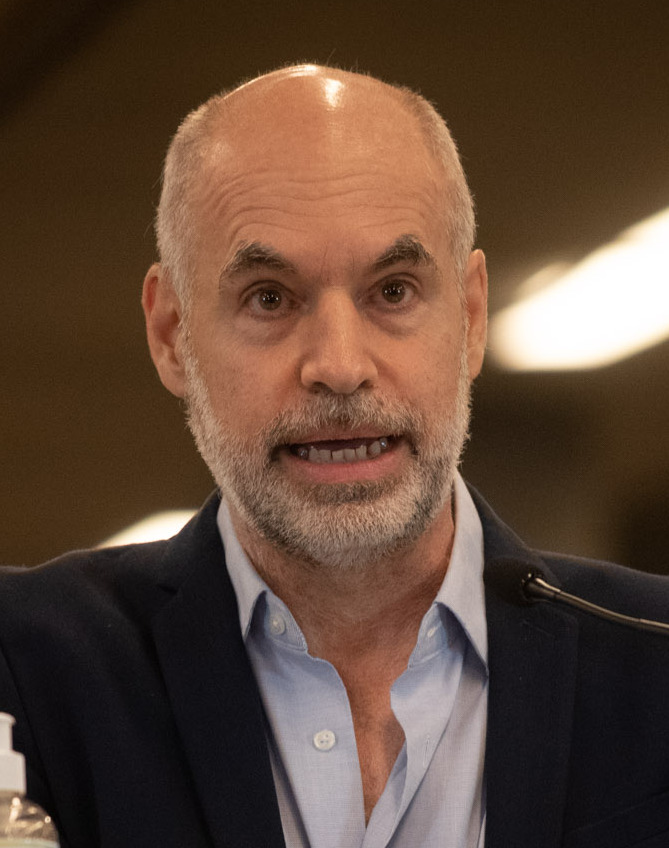

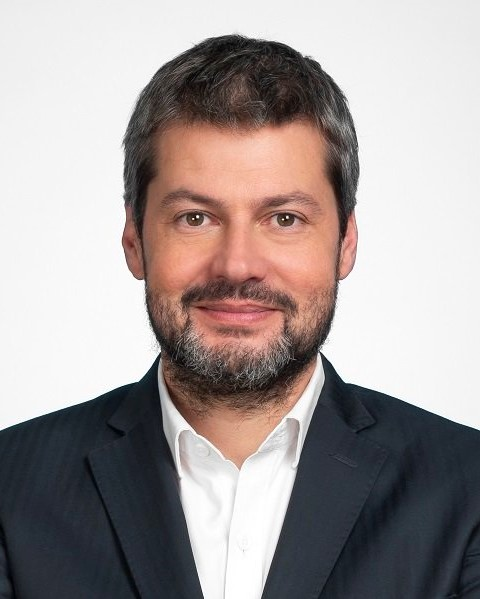

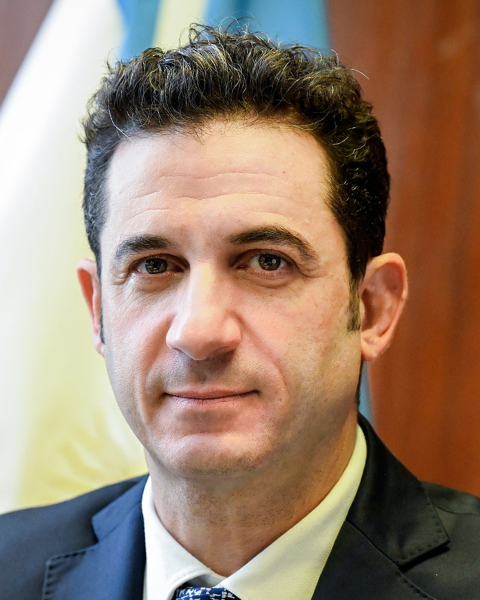

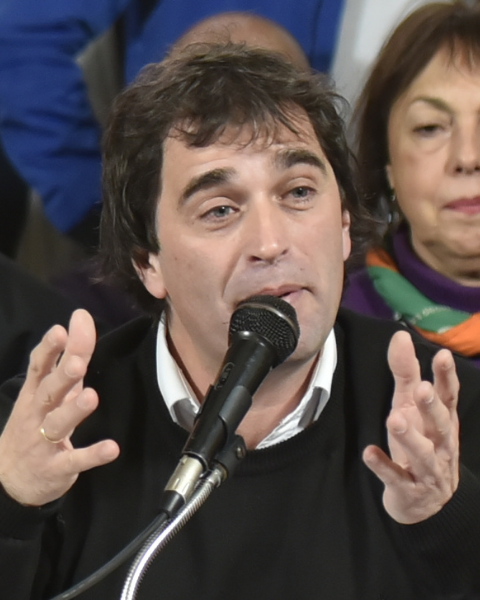
| Nominee | Horacio Rodríguez Larreta | Matías Lammens |
| Party | PRO | Independent |
| Alliance | JxC | FdT |
| Running mate | Diego Santilli | Gisela Marziotta |
| Popular vote | 1,095,013 | 687,026 |
| Percentage | 55.90% | 35.07% |
| Nominee | Matías Tombolini | Gabriel Solano |
| Party | APPS | Workers' Party |
| Alliance | CF | FIT – Unidad |
| Running mate | Daniela Gasparini | Vanesa Gagliardi |
| Popular vote | 105,083 | 71,619 |
| Percentage | 5.36% | 3.66% |
- Results of the Chief of Government election by commune.
Chief of Government before election
Horacio Rodríguez Larreta
PRO–JxC
Elected Chief of Government
Horacio Rodríguez Larreta
PRO–JxC
- City Legislature
| ← 2017 | 27 October 2019 | 2021 → |
- 30 out of 60 seats in the City Legislature
- Turnout: 79.78%
| Party | Leader | Vote % | Seats | +/– |
|---|---|---|---|---|
| JxC | Horacio Rodríguez Larreta | 54.22 | 17 | +1 |
| FdT | Matías Lammens | 33.88 | 11 | +5 |
| CF | Matías Tombolini | 5.44 | 1 | 0 |
| FIT – Unidad | Gabriel Solano | 4.68 | 1 | −1 |
This lists parties that won seats. See the complete results below.

General elections were held in the City of Buenos Aires on 27 October 2019, coinciding with the general election being held nationwide. The Chief of Government (mayor), half of the City Legislature and all 150 members of the communal boards were elected to four-year terms.

In the mayoral election, incumbent Horacio Rodríguez Larreta of the PRO party was re-elected for a second term with a record 55.90% of the vote. This was the first election since the adoption of the city's 1996 Constitution, which granted autonomy to the city and allowed it to vote for its own Chief of Government, in which a candidate won in the first round of voting.

== Background ==
The 2015 elections in Buenos Aires resulted in election of Horacio Rodríguez Larreta, former cabinet chief to Mauricio Macri and a leading figure within Republican Proposal (PRO) and its Juntos por el Cambio alliance (JxC). JxC also remained the largest force in the City Legislature.

Ahead of the 2019 election, the different parties of the Juntos por el Cambio coalition agreed to avoid a primary and unanimously backed the candidacy for re-election of Rodríguez Larreta. For their part, the newly formed opposition Frente de Todos coalition (made up of the Justicialist Party, the Renewal Front and other peronist and progressive parties) nominated businessman and San Lorenzo de Almagro president Matías Lammens.

== Candidates ==
| Coalition | Mayoral candidate (party) Prior political experience | Vice mayoral candidate (party) Prior political experience | Parties |
|---|---|---|---|
| | Horacio Rodríguez Larreta (PRO); Chief of Government (2015–2023) | Diego Santilli (PRO); Deputy Chief of Government (2015–2023) | PRO; UCR; CC-ARI; PS; CF; FE; MID; PDP; PRF |
| | Matías Lammens (Ind.); President of Club Atlético San Lorenzo (2012–2019) | Gisela Marziotta (PJ) | PJ; FR; FPG; FG; PV; ND; Kolina; PI; CF; NE; PSOL; FORJA; PF; PC; PTP; PSA; SL; RxBA; ParTE; PeM; FPyP |
| | Matías Tombolini (APPS); President of the Economic and Social Council of Buenos Aires (2018–2019) | Daniela Gasparini (LDS) | GEN; PSA; LDS; PF; APPS; PI |
| | Gabriel Solano (PO); City Legislator (2017–2020) | Vanesa Gagliard (MST) | PO; PTS; MST; IS |

== Opinion polling ==
| Pollster/client(s) | Date(s) conducted | Sample size | Larreta JxC | Lammens FDT | Tombolini CF | Solano FIT-U | Others | Blank | Abst. Undec. | Lead |
|---|---|---|---|---|---|---|---|---|---|---|
| 2019 city elections | 27 Oct 2019 | – | 55.9 | 35 | 5.4 | 3.7 | – | 4.9 | 20.2 | 20.8 |
| Management & Fit | Jul 2019 | | 44.1% | 41.9 | 1.7% | 1.5 | 4.5 | 0.5 | 5.8 | 2.2 |

== Results ==
=== Primaries ===
==== Mayoral primaries ====
| Coalition | List | Mayoral candidate | Candidate votes | | Overall votes | |
| Coalition | List | Mayoral candidate | Votes | % | Votes | % |
|---|---|---|---|---|---|---|
| Juntos por el Cambio | Juntos Somos el Cambio | Horacio Rodríguez Larreta | 905,875 | 46.23 | 905,875 | 46.23 |
| Frente de Todos | Celeste y Blanca | Matías Lammens | 623,044 | 31.80 | 623,044 | 31.80 |
| Federal Consensus | Consenso para el Futuro | Matías Tombolini | 140,583 | 7,18 | 140,583 | 7,18 |
| Worker's Left Front-Unity | Unidad | Gabriel Solano | 78,243 | 3.99 | 78,243 | 3.99 |
| Self-determination and Freedom | Que Los Pueblos Manden | Marta Martínez | 23,600 | 1.20 | 23,600 | 1.20 |
| Movement for Socialism | Unidad de la Izquierda | Miguel Ángel Forte | 17,682 | 0,91 | 17,682 | 0,91 |
| People's Dignity | Liberación | Leonardo Martínez Herrero | 2,216 | 0.11 | 2,216 | 0.11 |
| Unite for Freedom and Dignity | Dignidad | Roberto Valerstein | 994 | 0.05 | 994 | 0.05 |
| Valid votes | | | | | 1,829,526 | 100 |
| Blank votes | | | | | 166,974 | 8.52 |
| Invalid votes | | | | | 18,043 | 0.91 |
| Total | | | | | 1,977,254 | 91.48 |
| Registered voters/turnout | | | | | 2,588,852 | 76.38 |

=== Chief of Government ===
| Candidate | Running mate | Party | Votes | % |
|---|---|---|---|---|
| Horacio Rodríguez Larreta | Diego Santilli | Juntos por el Cambio | 1,095,013 | 55.90 |
| Matías Lammens | Gisela Marziotta | Frente de Todos | 687,026 | 35.07 |
| Matías Tombolini | Daniela Gasparini | Federal Consensus | 105,083 | 5.36 |
| Gabriel Solano | Vanesa Gagliardi | Workers' Left Front | 71,619 | 3.66 |
| Total | | | 1,958,741 | 100.00 |
| Valid votes | | | 1,958,741 | 95.03 |
| Invalid votes | | | 14,469 | 0.70 |
| Blank votes | | | 88,023 | 4.27 |
| Total votes | | | 2,061,233 | 100.00 |
| Registered voters/turnout | | | 2,583,527 | 79.78 |

==== Results by commune ====
Results of the Chief of Government election by commune

Communes won by Larreta
Communes won by Lammens

| Commune | Larreta (JxC) | | Lammens (FDT) | | Tombolini (CF) | | Solano (FIT-U) | | Total votes |
| Commune | Votes | % | Votes | % | Votes | % | Votes | % | Total votes |
|---|---|---|---|---|---|---|---|---|---|
| Comuna 1 | 69,139 | 55.49 | 45,671 | 36.66 | 5,532 | 4.44 | 4,250 | 3.41 | 124,592 |
| Comuna 2 | 79,171 | 73.90 | 21,540 | 20.11 | 3,774 | 3.52 | 2,644 | 2.47 | 107,129 |
| Comuna 3 | 59,206 | 50.72 | 46,054 | 39.46 | 6,524 | 5.59 | 4,934 | 4.23 | 116,718 |
| Comuna 4 | 61,506 | 45.21 | 61,706 | 45.36 | 7,548 | 5.55 | 5,285 | 3.88 | 136,045 |
| Comuna 5 | 61,859 | 50.82 | 47,188 | 38.76 | 7,165 | 5.89 | 5,516 | 4.53 | 121,728 |
| Comuna 6 | 73,928 | 57.96 | 41,598 | 32.61 | 7,016 | 5.50 | 5,008 | 3.93 | 127,550 |
| Comuna 7 | 69,191 | 51.34 | 52,729 | 39.13 | 7,924 | 5.88 | 4,916 | 3.65 | 134,760 |
| Comuna 8 | 43,879 | 40.20 | 55,535 | 50.89 | 6,174 | 5.66 | 3,546 | 3.25 | 109,134 |
| Comuna 9 | 55,684 | 47.92 | 48,483 | 41.72 | 7,926 | 6.82 | 4,108 | 3.54 | 116,201 |
| Comuna 10 | 61,119 | 52.08 | 43,608 | 37.16 | 8,061 | 6.87 | 4,560 | 3.89 | 117,348 |
| Comuna 11 | 77,442 | 56.58 | 45,903 | 33.53 | 8,461 | 6.18 | 5,078 | 3.71 | 136,884 |
| Comuna 12 | 88,422 | 58.21 | 48,886 | 32.18 | 8,743 | 5.76 | 5,841 | 3.85 | 151,892 |
| Comuna 13 | 118,955 | 69.79 | 39,103 | 22.94 | 7,044 | 4.13 | 5,341 | 3.14 | 170,443 |
| Comuna 14 | 111,104 | 69.25 | 38,597 | 24.06 | 6,015 | 3.75 | 4,717 | 2.94 | 160,433 |
| Comuna 15 | 64,393 | 50.45 | 50,198 | 39.33 | 7,172 | 5.62 | 5,868 | 4.60 | 127,631 |
| Prisons | 15 | 5.93 | 227 | 89.72 | 4 | 1.58 | 7 | 2.77 | 253 |
| Total | 1,095,013 | 55.90 | 687,026 | 35.07 | 105,083 | 5.36 | 71,619 | 4.28 | 1,958,741 |

=== Legislature ===
Distribution of seats in the City Legislature following the 2019 election: Let's Go Together (26) – ran as JxC Frente de Todos (17) UCR–Evolution (9) – ran as JxC Socialist Party (2) – ran as JxC Self-determination and Freedom (1) Federal Consensus (1) GEN (1) PTS–FIT-U (2) PO–FIT-U (1)

| Party | Votes | % | Seats |
|---|---|---|---|
| Juntos por el Cambio | 1,068,634 | 54.22 | 17 |
| Frente de Todos | 667,732 | 33.88 | 11 |
| Federal Consensus | 107,237 | 5.44 | 1 |
| Workers' Left Front – Unity | 92,233 | 4.68 | 1 |
| Unite for Freedom and Dignity | 35,243 | 1.79 | 0 |
| Total | 1,971,079 | 100.00 | 30 |
| Valid votes | 1,971,079 | 95.63 | |
| Invalid votes | 14,134 | 0.69 | |
| Blank votes | 76,020 | 3.69 | |
| Total votes | 2,061,233 | 100.00 | |
| Registered voters/turnout | 2,583,527 | 79.78 | |

== See also ==
- 2019 Argentine general election
- 2019 Argentine provincial elections
- 2019 Buenos Aires provincial election
- List of mayors and chiefs of government of Buenos Aires City
