= Matías Lammens =

Argentine businessman and politician

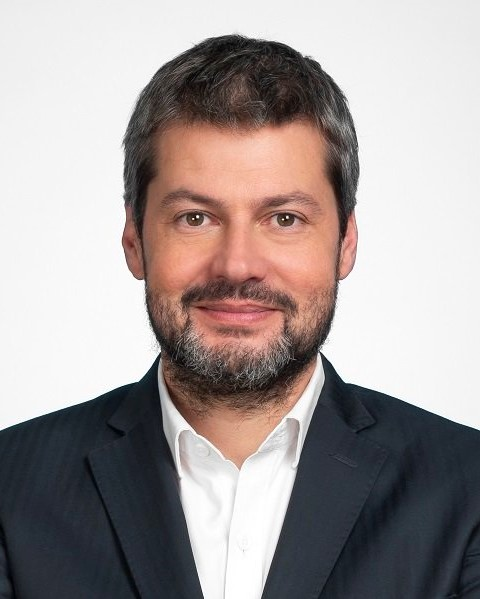

Legislator of the City of Buenos Aires
- Incumbent
- Assumed office 10 December 2023

Minister of Tourism and Sports
- In office 10 December 2019 – 10 December 2023
- President: Alberto Fernández
- Preceded by: Gustavo Santos (Tourism); Diógenes de Urquiza (Sports)
- Succeeded by: Office abolished

Personal details
- Born: 5 April 1980 (age 46) Buenos Aires, Argentina
- Party: Broad Front
- Other political affiliations: Frente de Todos (2019–2023); Union for the Homeland (since 2023)
- Education: University of Buenos Aires

Matías Daniel Lammens Núñez (Spanish pronunciation: [maˈtiaz ðaˈnjel ˈlamenz ˈnuɲes]; born 5 April 1980) is an Argentine businessman and politician, who served as the country's Minister of Tourism and Sports from 2019 to 2023, in the cabinet of President Alberto Fernández. Since 2023, he has been a member of the Buenos Aires City Legislature.

From 2012 to 2019 he was chairman of Club Atlético San Lorenzo de Almagro, a Buenos Aires–based sports club best known for its football team, which plays in the Primera División, the first tier of the Argentine football league system, and is considered one of the "big five" of Argentine football. With Lammens at its helm, the club won its first ever Copa Libertadores.

In 2019, Lammens was the Frente de Todos candidate for Chief of Government of Buenos Aires, competing against PRO incumbent Horacio Rodríguez Larreta. Lammens lost against Larreta in the first round, attaining a little over 35% of the vote.

== Early life and education ==
Matías Daniel Lammens Núñez was born on 5 April 1980 in Buenos Aires, Argentina. He was educated at the prestigious Colegio Nacional de Buenos Aires, graduating in 1998. Lammens has stated it was in the Colegio Nacional that he first became interested in politics. He studied law at the University of Buenos Aires and later studied political economy at the Torcuato di Tella University.

His business career started when he set up a kiosk in 2003; he later founded Ñuque Mapu SRL, a Buenos Aires–based company dedicated to the sale and distribution of alcoholic beverages, chiefly wine.

== Involvement in San Lorenzo ==
A lifelong supporter of the club, Lammens's involvement in the board of directors of Club Atlético San Lorenzo began in early 2012 through his close relationship with club associate and TV presenter Marcelo Tinelli, whom he met in a family reunion. Alongside Tinelli he formed the San Lorenzo Siglo XXI association, and upon the resignation of Carlos Abdo from the club's presidency in August 2012, he was appointed interim chairman, becoming the youngest person to hold the post at 32. He later ran for the chairmanship with Tinelli in the ticket as vice chairman, and won with over 80% of the popular vote.

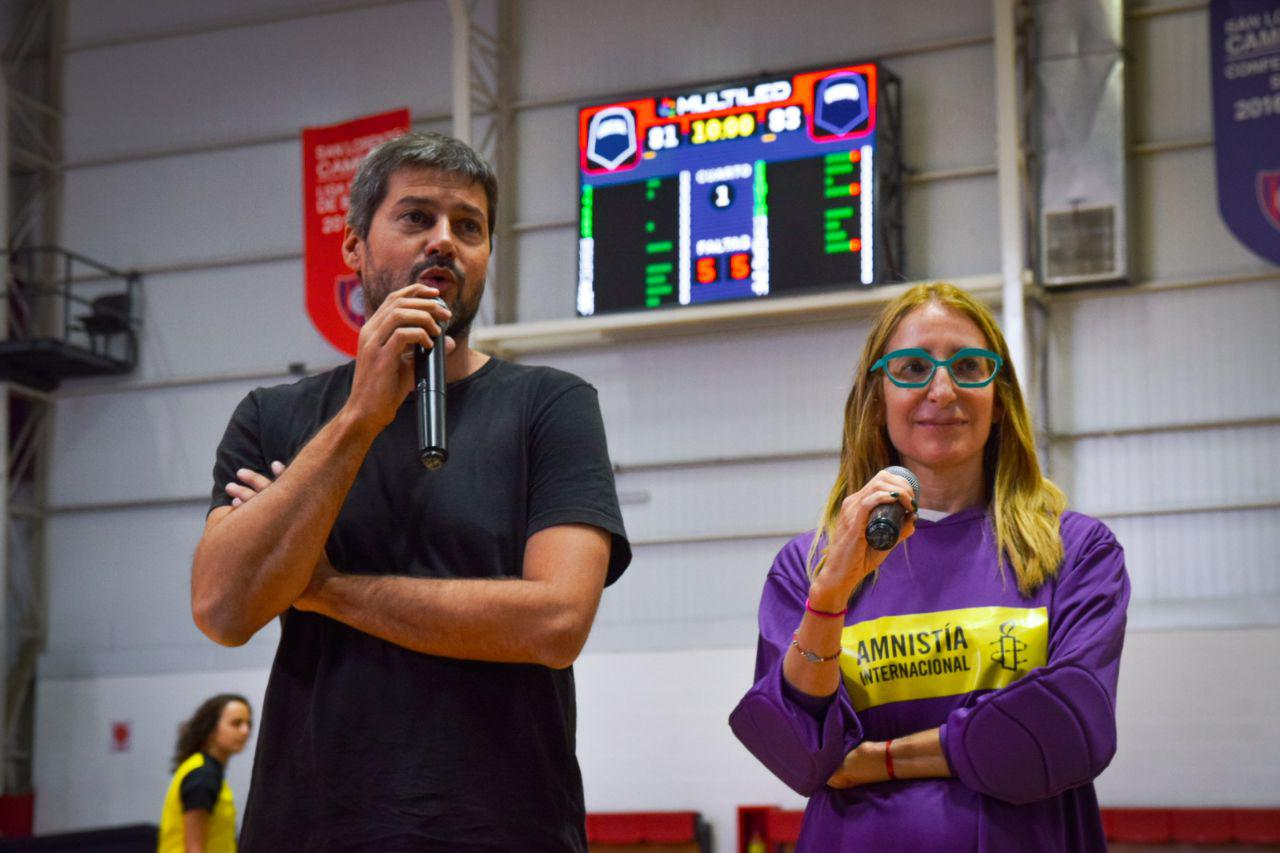
Lammens in 2019 as chairman of San Lorenzo

The club was in a dire situation at the time of Lammens's takeover, highly indebted and with a large operative deficit, and in the midst of a club workers' strike due to the former presidency's inability to pay their wages. The club's football team's position in the Primera División was threatened by a row of bad results, a situation that wouldn't be reversed until 2013. The Lammens-Tinelli leadership proved effective in reducing the club's financial woes, and the 2013 Torneo Inicial victory was hailed as a turnaround for San Lorenzo under its new directive board. Lammens later presented Pope Francis (a fan and follower of the club) with a replica of the coup.

Later, in 2014, San Lorenzo won the Copa Libertadores for the first time in the club's history. Lammens is also credited with lobbying the Buenos Aires City Legislature into ceding a space in the Boedo neighbourhood (historic home of San Lorenzo) to build the club's new home stadium. In October 2014 Lammens rejected an offer by the Azerbaijani government to sponsor the club, citing Azerbaijan's poor human rights record and the occupation of Nagorno-Karabakh; the move drew praise from Argentina's sizeable Armenian community.

== Political career ==
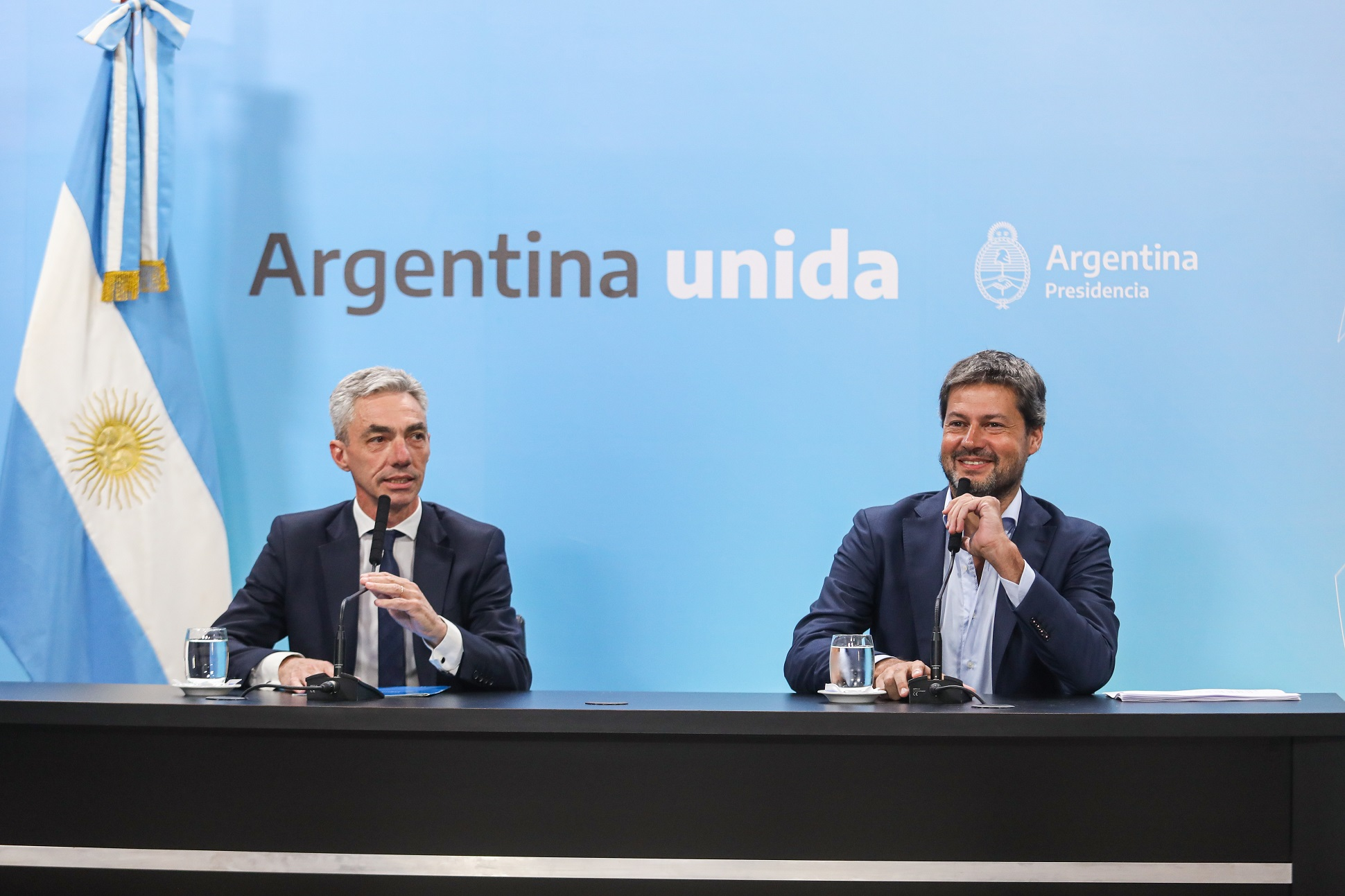
Mario Meoni (right, minister of transport) and Lammens as minister of tourism and sports during a conference in January 2020.

=== Buenos Aires mayoral run ===
In June 2019, Lammens stated his intention of running for Chief of Government (mayor) of Buenos Aires in that year's election as part of a broad front in opposition to the Republican Proposal-led government, composed of progressive and centre-left parties and leaders, saying that "Kirchnerism is not enough in the City". He confirmed his pre-candidacy (ahead of the simultaneous and mandatory open primaries) on 19 June 2019, as part of the Frente de Todos, the peronist coalition that endorsed the presidential candidacy of Alberto Fernández and Cristina Fernandez de Kirchner.

His mayoral ticket was completed by journalist and writer Gisela Marziotta, who ran as vice-chief of government. His campaign was focused on Mauricio Macri's perceived economic mismanagements in the national government, and the incumbent Horacio Rodríguez Larreta's association with the president and his party.

At the election on 27 October 2019, Lammens received a 687.026 votes – or 35% – losing in the first round against Rodríguez Larreta's 55.9%. Despite the wide loss margin, Lammens's share of the votes represents the best electoral result for an opposition party in Buenos Aires City since Mauricio Macri's victory in 2007.

=== Ministry of Tourism and Sports ===
On 10 December 2019, Lammens was appointed by incoming president Alberto Fernández as minister of the newly restored Ministry of Tourism and Sports, succeeding Gustavo Santos and Diógenes de Urquiza, respectively the secretaries of Tourism and of Sports in Mauricio Macri's cabinet. Sports-wise, Lammens stated his intention of focusing on neighbourhood clubs.

Lammens's appointment as Tourism and Sports minister coincided with the beginning of the COVID-19 pandemic in Argentina. The Fernández administration chose to close down nearly all sports venues, and the closing of the country's external and internal borders effectively shut down tourism for the duration of the lockdown measures. As part of the ministry's salvagement measures, Lammens launched an emergency investment fund, infrastructure boosts, and the PreViaje programme, wherein the government committed to repaying up to 50% of all travel expenses for internal tourists in the 2020–2021 summer season. Over 500.000 people signed up for the programme, according to government figures. The programme was renewed ahead of the 2021–2022 summer season as well.

Since 2021, he has been a member of the Broad Front (FG), and presently serves in its national board.

== Personal life ==
Lammens is married to sociologist Mariana Gené, with whom he has two daughters; they live in the neighbourhood of Palermo, in Buenos Aires. He defines himself as agnostic, and is in favor of the legalization of abortion in Argentina.

== Electoral history ==
=== Executive ===
Electoral history of Matías Lammens
Election	Office	List	Votes			Result	Ref.
Election	Office	List	Total	%	P.	Result	Ref.
2019	Chief of Government of Buenos Aires	Frente de Todos	687,026	35.07%	2nd	Not elected	

=== Legislative ===
Electoral history of Victoria Montenegro
Election	Office	List	#	District	Votes			Result	Ref.
Election	Office	List	#	District	Total	%	P.	Result	Ref.
2023	City Legislator	Union for the Homeland	1	City of Buenos Aires	557,808	31.13%	2nd (Note: Presented on an electoral list. The data shown represents the share of the vote the entire party/alliance received in that constituency.)	Elected	
