= Jorge Macri =

Chief of Government of Buenos Aires (born 1965)

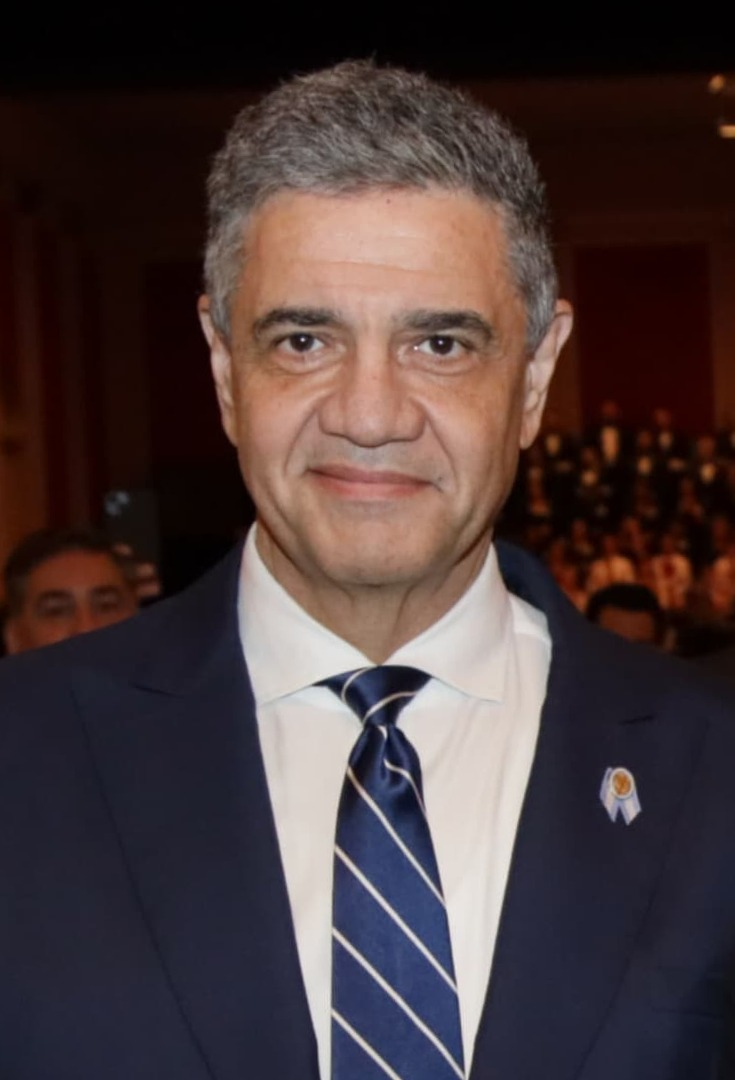
- Macri in 2023

7th Chief of Government of Buenos Aires
- Incumbent
- Assumed office 7 December 2023
- Deputy: Clara Muzzio
- Preceded by: Horacio Rodríguez Larreta

Minister of Government of Buenos Aires
- In office 2 December 2021 – 7 December 2023
- Mayor: Horacio Rodríguez Larreta
- Preceded by: Bruno Screnci Silva
- Succeeded by: César Ángel Torres

Mayor of Vicente López
- In office 12 December 2011 – 1 December 2021
- Preceded by: Enrique García Tomé
- Succeeded by: Soledad Martínez

Provincial Deputy of Buenos Aires
- In office 10 December 2005 – 10 December 2011
- Constituency: Third Electoral Section

Personal details
- Born: 5 March 1965 (age 61) Tandil, Argentina
- Party: Commitment to Change (2003–2005); Republican Proposal (since 2005)
- Other political affiliations: Juntos por el Cambio (2015–2023)
- Spouse: María Belén Ludueña (m. 2022)
- Children: 3
- Relatives: Mauricio Macri (cousin)
- Occupation: Politician
- Website: Campaign website

Jorge Macri (born 5 March 1965) is an Argentine politician who is the Chief of Government of Buenos Aires since 7 December 2023, and previously served as Minister of Government of Buenos Aires from 2021 to 2023. He is the cousin of former president Mauricio Macri.

== Political career ==
Macri started his political career in 2001 when he became the manager of Mauricio Macri Career and Career Foundation campaign. Afterwards, he joined the party Commitment to Change led by Mauricio Macri.

In 2005, Macri joined Republican Proposal the new founded party by Mauricio Macri, and ran in the province of Buenos Aires as councilman. Two years later, he became the first magistrate of Vicente López.

=== Mayor of Vicente López ===
In 2011, Macri ran for Mayor of Vicente López and was elected with 38% of the votes, defeating Enrique Japonés García Saá of Radical Civic Union who received 34% of the votes. From an initiative that launched the Bueno Aires participation in educational institutions in the same year, it resulted into the opening by Macri in 2014 of Vicente Lopez University Center, the first ever university of the municipality. In matters of security, 300 security cameras were installed, in addition to forming the central alarm of panic buttons and warning of alarms and emergency incidents. In November 2014, he made an agreement with Buenos Aires, which at that time had Mauricio Macri, as mayor, which established the agreement to carry out the metrobus of Buenos Aires North. The project cost 270 million pesos, of which the municipality paid 30 million in exchange for future hydraulic works to prevent flooding.

In 2015, he re-elected with 54% of the votes, increasing his vote share. Under his second tenure, the municipality built and opened a new hospital. In 2016 he was included in the Panama Papers in 2016 title holders of offshore companies in Panama, having properties in Miami. The Office of Economic Crime and Money Laundering responded by making an official complaint, with a federal judge, ordering the seizure from his account of 8 million pesos. The measure had been requested by the prosecutor of the case.

In 2019, he was re-elected with 64% of the vote, further increasing his vote share. Under his third tenure and in the midst of the COVID-19 pandemic, in July 2020 the municipality created a non-essential business economic program, in order to help the barred businesses that maintain permanent security under the Social Preventive Act. The program included a municipal tax exception, in addition to a subsidy of 20,000 pesos, which meant the withdrawal of 44 million pesos from the municipality.

=== Chief of Government of Buenos Aires ===
Macri stepped down as Mayor of Vicente López on 1 December 2021. The following day, he was appointed as Minister of Government by Horacio Rodríguez Larreta.

In 2023, he announced his candidacy for Chief of Government of Buenos Aires. In response three legal challenges against Macri's candidacy were presented by Vanina Biasi of the Workers' Left Front as well as Eugenio Artaza and Juan Pablo Chiesa from the Renewal Front. They contended that his candidacy violated article 97 of the Buenos Aires City constitution, which states that in order to be elected, among other things, the candidate must “have a routine and permanent residence in the city no less than five years prior to the election date." However, the electoral court said that documents provided by Macri’s lawyers gave sufficient proof of his residency in two city addresses between 1981 and 2006 as well as voting records and allowed him to run.

Following his approval to run as the candidate of Republican Proposal, he was endorsed by the incumbent Larreta, presidential candidate Patricia Bullrich and Mauricio Macri. He won the PASO on 13 August 2023 with 29% of the votes, one percent more than his challenger Martín Lousteau of Radical Civic Union, earning the endorsement of Juntos por el Cambio.

He went on to win the Buenos Aires City mayoral elections with 49.3% of the votes held concurrently with the general elections. However, it was less than a simple majority of 50% of the votes meaning a run-off on November 19 against Leandro Santoro, representing Union for the Homeland who got 32.3% of the votes. Macri said during his victory speech at Juntos por el Cambio headquarters after the first round results were announced; “We feel great joy.” Javier Milei of La Libertad Avanza, who came in second at the presidential election and advanced to the runoff, endorsed Macri after the first-round results. Days later, Santoro withdrew, stating that "A realistic assessment of these electoral results […] lead us to believe that it would be unwise to force a run-off", meaning Macri was automatically elected Chief of Government of Buenos Aires, succeeding Larreta.

Macri, along with Mauricio Macri and Bullrich, endorsed Milei in the second round over Sergio Massa of Union for the Homeland. Milei later won the run-off with 56% of the vote in what was described as a historic election, becoming the next President. Both Macri and Mauricio Macri congratulated Milei, wishing luck to his incoming presidency. Jorge Macri took office on 7 December 2023 (three days earlier than expected), while Milei was (as planned) inaugurated on 10 December 2023.

Macri spoke several times against cycling infrastructure during his campaign. Bike lanes began to be quietly removed in December 2024. In 2025, he announced the introduction of the Guarani language as an option at primary schools, a decision made after meeting with Paraguayan president Santiago Peña.

== Private life ==
Macri was born in Tandil on 5 March 1965. He has 3 children and is married to María Belén Ludueña. In his free time, he watches soccer, is a Club Atlético River Plate fan and is passionate about cooking. He is the first cousin of former president Maurcio Macri.

== Electoral history ==
=== Executive ===
Electoral history of Jorge Macri
| Election | Office | List | Votes | | | Result | Ref. |
| Election | Office | List | Total | % | P. | Result | Ref. |
|---|---|---|---|---|---|---|---|
| 2007 | Vice Governor of Buenos Aires | PRO Union | 1,047,126 | 14.96% | 3rd | Not elected | |
| 2011 | Mayor of Vicente López | Popular Front | 62,154 | 38.42% | 1st | Elected | |
| 2015 | Mayor of Vicente López | Let's Change Buenos Aires | 98,914 | 54.95% | 1st | Elected | |
| 2019 | Mayor of Vicente López | Together for Change | 116,048 | 62.49% | 1st | Elected | |
| 2023 PASO | Chief of Government of Buenos Aires | Let's Go for More | 540,132 | 29.52% | 1st | Elected (Note: Won the coalition's internal election.) | |
| 2023 1-R | Chief of Government of Buenos Aires | Together for Change | 895,131 | 49.67% | 1st | Elected | |

=== Legislative ===
Electoral history of Jorge Macri
| Election | Office | List | # | District | Votes | | | Result | Ref. |
| Election | Office | List | # | District | Total | % | P. | Result | Ref. |
|---|---|---|---|---|---|---|---|---|---|
| 2005 | Provincial Deputy | Republican Proposal | 1 | Third Electoral Section | 196.800 | 8.36% | 3rd (Note: Presented on an electoral list. The data shown represents the share of the vote the entire party/alliance received in that constituency.) | Elected | |
| 2007 | National Deputy | Republican Proposal | 1 | Buenos Aires Province | 658,025 | 10.27% | 3rd | Elected (Note: Never assumed office.) | |
| 2009 | Provincial Deputy | PRO Union | 1 | Third Electoral Section | 830.634 | 32.56% | 2nd | Elected | |

Political offices
| Preceded by Enrique García Tomé | Mayor of Vicente López; 2011–2021 | Succeeded by Soledad Martínez |
| Preceded by Horacio Rodríguez Larreta | Chief of Government of Buenos Aires; 2023–present | Incumbent |
