= Maria Llimona i Benet =

Catalan sculptor

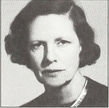
- Portrait of Maria Llimona
- Born: Maria Llimona i Benet; February 3, 1894; Barcelona
- Died: October 26, 1985 (aged 91); Barcelona
- Occupation: sculptor
- Notable work: Mermaids of Santa Clotilde Gardens

Maria Llimona i Benet (Barcelona, February 3, 1894 - Barcelona, October 26, 1985) was a Catalan sculptor. She was the daughter of the sculptor Josep Llimona and Mercè Benet i Salas, and sister of the painter Rafael Llimona. Maria began in the art of sculpture in a late age and studied with Rodolfo Castagnino in Italy, where she was in exile due to the Spanish Civil War.

In 1950 she was among the participants in the National Exhibition of Fine Arts in Madrid, where she presented a bronze, Retrat de la Senyora M. M., and a garden fountain.

Much of her work focuses on female nudes, portraiture and religious sculpture, with a style close to Catalan Noucentisme, rather than that of her father. Her works include Monument al Doctor Andreu and a set of mermaids in the gardens of Santa Clotilde in Lloret de Mar. She has work exhibited in the permanent collection of the Museu Nacional d'Art de Catalunya, in the Santa Maria de Montserrat Abbey Museum, as well as in other Catalan and international collections. She married the sculptor Domènec Carles i Rosich, with whom she often exhibited together.

She was part of the circle of women intellectuals and artists friends of the Russian painter Olga Sacharoff, among with painters like Soledad Martínez, Marie Laurencin, Dagoussia and Ángeles Santos, the sculptor Lluïsa Granero and the writers Clementina Arderiu and Elisabeth Mulder.
