= Leandro Santoro =

Argentine politician (born 1976)

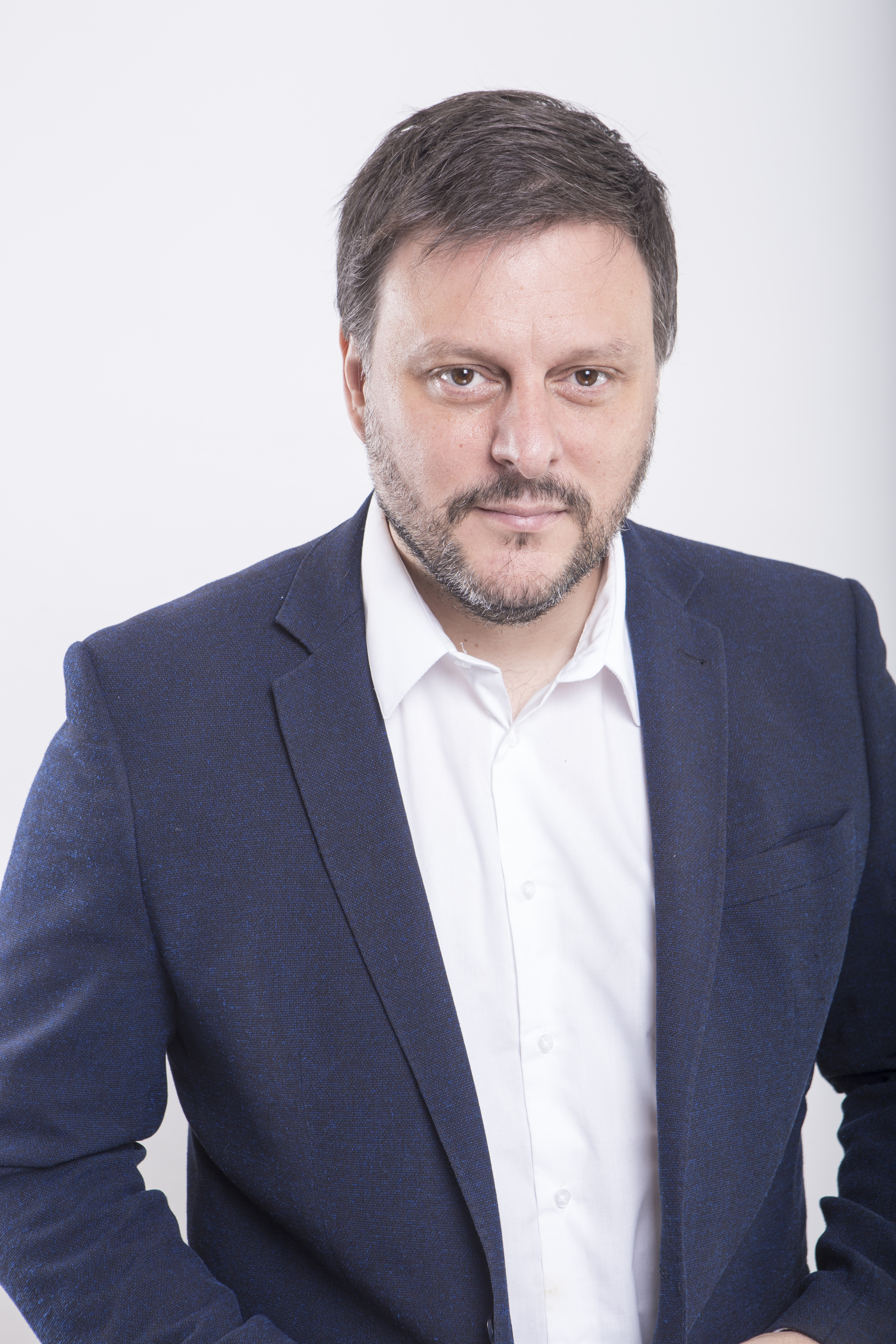
- Official portrait, 2023

Legislator of the City of Buenos Aires
- Incumbent
- Assumed office 10 December 2025
- Constituency: City of Buenos Aires
- In office 10 December 2017 – 10 December 2021

National Deputy
- In office 10 December 2021 – 10 December 2025

Personal details
- Born: 11 June 1976 (age 50) Buenos Aires, Argentina
- Party: Radical Civic Union (1990–2015); National Alfonsinist Movement (2015–present)
- Other political affiliations: Front for Victory (2015–2017); Unidad Ciudadana (2017–2019); Frente de Todos (2019–2023); Union for the Homeland (2023-present)
- Education: University of Buenos Aires
- Website: www.leandrosantoro.com

Leandro Santoro (Buenos Aires, 11 June 1977) is an Argentine political scientist, professor and politician, currently serving as a member of the Buenos Aires City Legislature since 2025. Santoro previously served in the same body from 2017 to 2021 and as a National Deputy from 2021 to 2025. He is a member of the centre-left political coalition Union for the Homeland.

Though his political career began in the Radical Civic Union (UCR), since 2015 Santoro has been aligned with the National Alfonsinist Movement, a faction of the UCR that broke away from the party and backed the Front for Victory.

== Early life and career ==
Santoro was born on 11 June 1976 in the Buenos Aires neighbourhood of Boedo. He was raised by a single mother and attended the Colegio Salesiano San Francisco de Sales, a Catholic boys' school. Starting at age 13, he joined the Radical Civic Union (UCR) inspired by his admiration for then-president Raúl Alfonsín. In time, Santoro would become a leader in the Juventud Radical, the UCR's youth wing.

In 1999, Santoro and other members of his local UCR committee camped outside the Hospital Italiano, where Alfonsín had been hospitalised following a potentially lethal accident, for 40 days. The event helped forge a deeper connection between Alfonsín and Santoro. He formed part of Los Irrompibles, an alfonsinist group within the UCR founded by Jesús Rodríguez.

Santoro studied political science at the University of Buenos Aires, and later taught courses at the university's UBA XXI programme.

== Political career ==
Following Alfonsín's death in 2009, Santoro and other alfonsinists started getting closer to the Front for Victory, which then supported the government of Cristina Fernández de Kirchner. In 2014, upon Fernández de Kirchner's invitation, he formed part of the state delegation that visited Pope Francis in the Vatican. In 2015, he joined Leopoldo Moreau in breaking away from the UCR and founding the pro-Kirchner National Alfonsinist Movement. That year, he was Mariano Recalde's running mate for Chief of Government of Buenos Aires on the Front for Victory list: the ticket received 21.91% of the vote and landed third.

In 2017, Santoro was elected to the Buenos Aires City Legislature as the fourth candidate in the Unidad Porteña list, which received 21.26% of the vote. Following the 2019 general election, he joined the Frente de Todos and sat in the unified FdT bloc in the Legislature.

In the 2021 legislative election, Santoro ran for a seat in the Chamber of Deputies as the first candidate in the Frente de Todos list in Buenos Aires. With 25.06% of the vote, the FDT was the second-most voted alliance in the city, enough for Santoro to make it past the D'Hondt cut and be elected, alongside Gisela Marziotta and Carlos Heller. He was sworn in on 4 December 2021, and began his mandate on 10 December 2021.

== Personal life ==
Santoro was married to Cecilia Moreau, a fellow politician and daughter of the prominent political leader (and Santoro's former political mentor) Leopoldo Moreau. Santoro and Moreau have a daughter together, Francisca. Since 2021, Santoro has sat in the Chamber of Deputies alongside both Moreaus.

Santoro has since married a childhood friend, pharmacist Clara González Sorey, with whom he has a daughter, Antonia.

Sports-wise, he is a supporter of the local Boedo-based San Lorenzo de Almagro.

== Electoral history ==
=== Executive ===
Electoral history of Leandro Santoro
Election	Office	List	Votes			Result	Ref.
Election	Office	List	Total	%	P.	Result	Ref.
2015	Deputy Chief of Government of Buenos Aires	Front for Victory	400,522	21.92%	3rd	Not elected	
2023	Chief of Government of Buenos Aires	Union for the Homeland	581,450	32.27%	2nd	Not elected	

=== Legislative ===
Electoral history of Leandro Santoro
Election	Office	List	#	District	Votes			Result	Ref.
Election	Office	List	#	District	Total	%	P.	Result	Ref.
2017	City Legislator	Unidad Porteña	4	City of Buenos Aires	408,462	21.26%	2nd (Note: Presented on an electoral list. The data shown represents the share of the vote the entire party/alliance received in that constituency.)	Elected	
2021	National Deputy	Frente de Todos	1	City of Buenos Aires	461,514	25.06%	2nd	Elected	
2025	City Legislator	It's Now Buenos Aires	1	City of Buenos Aires	449,444	27.35%	2nd	Elected	
