= Vanina Biasi =

Argentine politician (born 1973)

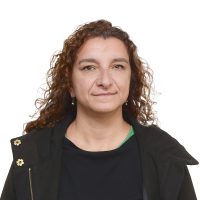
- Official portrait, 2024

National Deputy
- In office 27 June 2024 – 2 July 2025
- Preceded by: Myriam Bregman
- Succeeded by: Mercedes de Mendieta
- Constituency: City of Buenos Aires

Personal details
- Born: 27 October 1973 (age 52) Buenos Aires, Argentina
- Party: Workers' Party
- Other political affiliations: Workers' Left Front (since 2011)
- Website: Profile of the Workers' Party

Vanina Natalia Biasi (born 27 October 1973) is an Argentine politician, who served as a national deputy, representing the city of Buenos Aires.

She assumed her seat in June 2024, taking over from Myriam Bregman, and resigned in July 2025, as part of a rotation agreement implemented by the Workers' Left Front.

She is a member of the Workers' Party within the Workers' Left Front

== Political career ==
In 2007 she was the Workers' Party candidate for Deputy Chief of Government of Buenos Aires, as the running mate of Marcelo Ramal. The Ramal-Biasi ticket won 0.90% of the vote and landed 8th in the first round of voting.

=== 2023 elections ===
In the 2023 Buenos Aires elections, after surpassing the list of Jorge Adaro of the Socialist Left in the PASO primaries, Biasi was the candidate for Chief of Government for FIT-U, accompanied by Jessica Gentile of the MST as a candidate for Deputy Chief of Government, obtaining 4.28% of the votes.

=== National Deputy ===
In June 2024, after the resignation of Myriam Bregman due to the FIT-U bench rotation agreement, Biasi assumed the position of national representative for the City of Buenos Aires.

At her inauguration, Biasi swore for the women's and diversities movement, for the piquetero movement, for the rights of the working class, for ending capitalist barbarism in the world, for the end of the genocide in Palestine, for a workers' government and for socialism.

An "Argentine federal judge" indicted Biasi in April 2025 for what were deemed "antisemitic" X posts."

Biasi resigned from her seat in the Chamber of Deputies on 2 July 2025 and was replaced by Mercedes de Mendieta due to the rotation agreement implemented by the Worker's Left Front.

== Electoral history ==
=== Executive ===
Electoral history of Vanina Biasi
| Election | Office | List | Votes | | | Result | Ref. |
| Election | Office | List | Total | % | P. | Result | Ref. |
|---|---|---|---|---|---|---|---|
| 2007 | Deputy Chief of Government of Buenos Aires | Workers' Party | 15,623 | 0.90% | 7th | Not elected | |
| 2023 | Chief of Government of Buenos Aires | Workers' Left Front | 77,077 | 4.28% | 4th | Not elected | |

=== Legislative ===
Electoral history of Vanina Biasi
| Election | Office | List | # | District | Votes | | | Result | Ref. |
| Election | Office | List | # | District | Total | % | P. | Result | Ref. |
|---|---|---|---|---|---|---|---|---|---|
| 2011 | City Legislator | Workers' Left Front | 4 | City of Buenos Aires | 17,838 | 1.01% | 12th (Note: Presented on an electoral list. The data shown represents the share of the vote the entire party/alliance received in that constituency.) | Not elected | |
| 2021 | National Deputy | Workers' Left Front | 3 | City of Buenos Aires | 142,581 | 7.74% | 4th | Not elected (Note: Assumed office on 27 June 2024 following the resignation of Myriam Bregman.) | |
| 2025 | City Legislator | Workers' Left Front | 1 | City of Buenos Aires | 51,925 | 3.16% | 5th | Elected | |
