= Mercedes de Mendieta =

Argentine politician

- Official portrait, 2025

National Deputy
- Incumbent
- Assumed office 2 July 2025
- Preceded by: Vanina Biasi
- Constituency: City of Buenos Aires

Personal details
- Born: 12 November 1986 (age 39) Buenos Aires, Argentina
- Party: Socialist Left
- Other political affiliations: Workers' Left Front (since 2011)

Mercedes de Mendieta (born c. 1989) is an activist in Socialist Left (Argentina).

She was a member of the legislature of the Autonomous City of Buenos Aires for two terms. Her first term started in June 2021 and lasted until December 2021, while her second term went from October 2022 to June 2023.

She has been involved in the campaign for legal, free and safe abortion.

She replaced Vanina Biasi in the Chamber of Deputies on July 2, 2025.

== Further information ==
- video about her taking her seat (Spanish)
- interview on Frecuencia Zero (Spanish)
