= Kirchnerism =

Argentine political movement

Kirchnerism Kirchnerismo
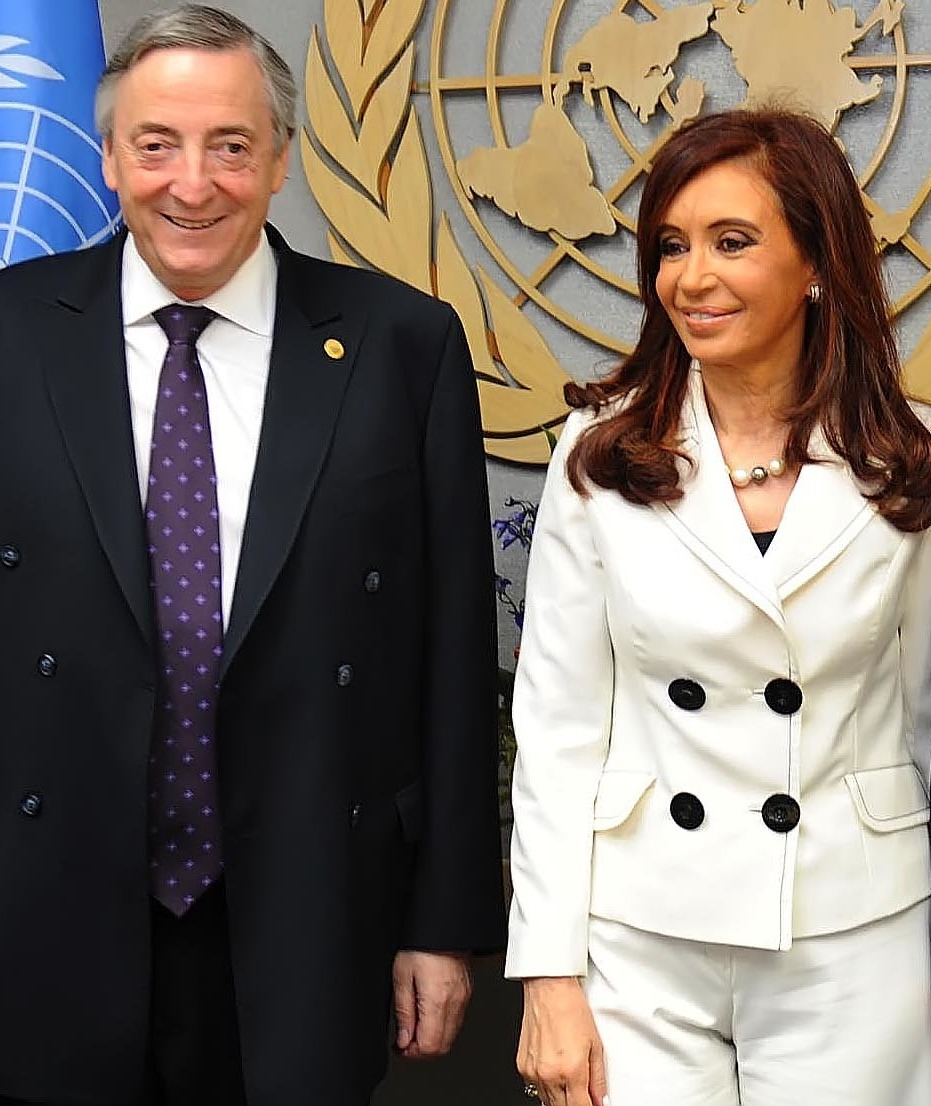
- Néstor Kirchner (left) and Cristina Fernández de Kirchner (right) served as Presidents of Argentina from 2003–2007 and 2007–2015, respectively.
- Leader: Cristina Fernández de Kirchner
- Founder: Néstor Kirchner
- Founded: 1 March 2003; 23 years ago
- Headquarters: Buenos Aires
- Youth wing: The Campora
- Membership: Justicialist Party
- Ideology: Peronism; Anti-neoliberalism; Social democracy Left-wing populism Progressivism; Socialism of the 21st century Factions: K Radicalism; Socialism; Communism; Liberation theology
- Political position: Centre-left to left-wing
- National affiliation: Front for Victory (2003–2017); Citizen's Unity (2017–2019); Frente de Todos (2019–2023); Union for the Homeland (since 2023)
- Seats in the Chamber of Deputies: 90 / 257
- Seats in the Senate: 32 / 72

Website
- www.pj.org.ar

Kirchnerism (Spanish: Kirchnerismo [kiɾʃneˈɾismo]) is an Argentine centre-left to left-wing political movement based on ideals formed by the supporters of spouses Néstor Kirchner and Cristina Fernández de Kirchner, who consecutively served as Presidents of Argentina. Although considered a branch of Peronism, it is opposed by some factions of Peronists and generally considered to fall into the category of left-wing populism. It is considered a representative of the socialism of the 21st century, although similarly to Peronism and in contrast to other left-wing ideologies, it is highly nationalist and populist rather than class-based.

Although originally a section in the Justicialist Party, Kirchnerism later received support from other smaller Argentine political parties (like the Communist Party or the Humanist Party) and from factions of some traditional parties (like the Radical Civic Union and the Socialist Party). In parties which are divided along Kirchnerist and anti-Kirchnerist lines, the members of the Kirchnerist faction are often distinguished with the letter K (for instance "peronistas K", "justicialistas K", "radicales K", or "socialistas K") while the anti-Kirchnerist factions, those opposing Kirchnerism, are similarly labelled with the expression "anti-K".

== Characteristics ==
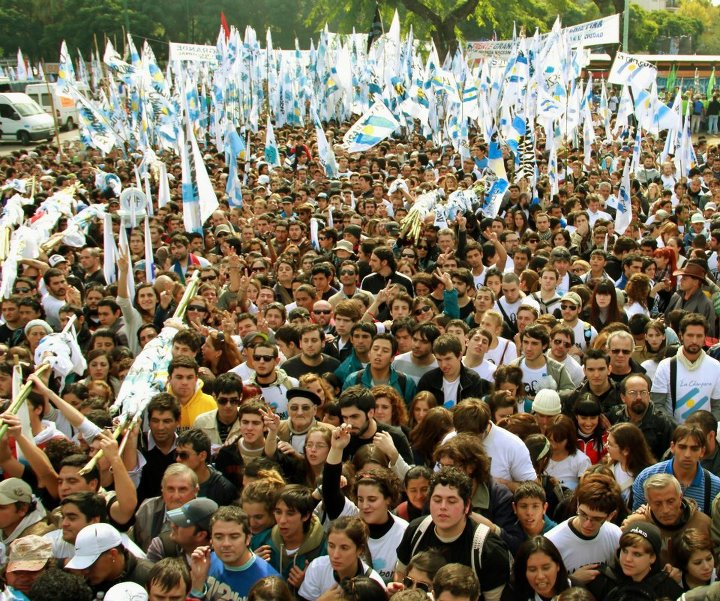
Rally of youth belonging to La Cámpora, April 2012

Both Kirchner and Fernández come from the left wing of Peronism and both began their political careers as members of the Peronist Youth (Juventud Peronista). Many of the Kirchners' closest allies belong to the Peronist left. Anti-Kirchnerists often criticize this ideological background with the term setentista ("seventies-ist"), suggesting that Kirchnerism is overly influenced by the populist struggle of the 1970s.

In its electoral campaigns, the Kirchnerist candidates combined the traditional elements of Peronism - nationalism, anti-imperialism, and economic redistribution. Similarly to classical Peronism, the support base of Kirchnerism became the working class, unemployed, and the new social movement. Kirchnerism is considered to be a part of the larger Pink Tide in Latin America - a rise of left-wing populist movements. Kirchnerism has also been described as similar to the ideologies of China and Venezuela - Socialism with Chinese Characteristics and Chavismo.

Kirchnerist policies have been described as progressive and left-wing; Kirchnerists pursued cooperation with Venezuela, Brazil and Cuba, denounced U.S. interventionist policies and strongly opposed the IMF and austerity measures. Considered assertively anti-neoliberal, Kirchnerist administrations subsidized social services - income transfers and healthcare systems were greatly expanded, most notably extending the free prescription drugs to 15 million people (about 41 percent of the country’s population). They also pursued the traditional Peronist policy of intervening in union conflicts and providing state backing to wage increase demands. The period of Kirchnerist governments was the second longest Argentina had gone without general strikes, toppled only by the period Perón's governance (1946-1955).

Initially, Kirchnerism has shown itself to be concerned with the defense of human rights, particularly in prosecuting those who committed human rights violations during the Dirty War and were later made immune from prosecution by the governments of Carlos Menem (1989–1999). The willingness of the Kirchner government to revoke these immunities has led many Argentine pressure groups, such as the Madres de Plaza de Mayo and Abuelas de Plaza de Mayo, to take an actively Kirchnerist position. This has led to many controversies and to allegations that the Kirchners were never fully committed to human rights, especially during the period of the last military dictatorship, and that it was only when Kirchner became President and began to make alliances with the left-wing parties in Congress and with the Madres de Plaza de Mayo that he started to campaign about these rights in order to promote his own platform and gain popular favor. It is documented nevertheless that the Kirchners did push for trial against human rights violators during the dictatorship, although late in that period in 1983, when its end was already in sight.

Economically, Kirchnerism has pursued an economic policy of industrialist developmentalism, and tariffs to protect the local industry and employment. The movement was also characterized by actively developing economic relations with Brazil and Venezuela; it took an antagonistic position towards the IMF and the United States, denouncing both for imperialist policies and promoting austerity measures. Under Kirchner, the national economy started recovering, which resulted in economic growth and declining unemployment by 2003. This allowed Kirchnerism to become the dominant force of modern Peronism. Political scientists Bonvecchi and Zelaznik wrote: "Menem had converted Peronism from a labor-based party to a “neoliberal” force. Kirchner's agenda, contrary to Menem's, was in tune with the traditional state-centered Peronist preferences. Kirchner was therefore able to return Peronism to its political tradition." Kirchnerism came to be seen as a movement that "represents the current version of left Peronism, modernised for the times".

Internationally, Kirchnerism has strongly supported Mercosur and vice versa, to the point that the President of Mercosur, Carlos Álvarez, is a Kirchnerist. One of the most prominent aims of Kirchnerism is to strengthen Argentine relations with the countries of Latin America and to establish a South American economic axis. Recent economic measures posited by Fernández's government have nevertheless hurt Argentina's relationship with these countries, mainly Brazil and Uruguay, whose President José "Pepe" Mujica expressed worries regarding Argentina going towards an "autarkist" form of government and the Kirchnerist economic model "complicating relationships and multiplying difficulties" in bilateral commerce. Kirchnerism, in particular former minister of health Ginés González García, has shown a liberal attitude to birth control and sexuality, including the legalization of same-sex marriage, both of which have provoked the opposition of the Catholic Church and other conservative sectors.

== Ideology ==
=== Five economic tenets ===
Kirchnerism has been described as left-wing. According to Alberto Fernández, the Chief of the Cabinet of Ministers during the first five years of Kirchnerism and former President of Argentina, they followed five tenets regarding the economy, which explained the perceived early success of the movement:

1. "Take no measures that increase the fiscal deficit"
2. "Take no measures that increase the trade deficit"
3. "Accumulate reserves in the central bank"
4. "Keep the exchange rate very high to stay competitive and favor exports"
5. "Pay off the external debt and do not acquire new debt"

According to Fernández, Cristina Fernández de Kirchner moved away from these five tenets after her husband's death, causing an economic crisis that resulted in the first political defeat of Kirchnerism in a presidential election in 2015. In the presidential election of 2019, Kirchnerism returned to power with the election of Alberto Fernández as President and Cristina Kirchner as Vice President. In the 2021 legislative elections on 14 November 2021, the Frente de Todos lost its majority in Congress for the first time in almost 40 years in midterm legislative elections. The election victory of the center-right coalition, Juntos por el Cambio (Together for Change), meant a tough final two years in office for President Alberto Fernandez. Losing control of the Senate made it difficult for him to make key appointments, including to the judiciary. It also forced him to negotiate with the opposition every initiative he sent to the legislature.

Ronaldo Munck described Kirchnerism as close to Chavismo, including left-wing nationalism. Munck wrote that Kirchnerism is "clearly part of the anti-imperialist left". Political scientists Gary Prevost and Carlos Oliva Campos state that Kirchnerism represents Peronism's return "to its traditional center-left stance" under Juan Perón, and note that under Kirchners, "Peronists have returned to a progressive orientation, distancing themselves almost completely from the decade-long neoliberal detour under Carlos Menem." Economically, Kirchnerist governments pursued a redistributive agenda based on promoting the interests of organized labor. Like classical Peronism, Kirchnerism relies on the support of the informal sector workers and the unemployed (the piqueteros), the poor, and trade unions. Kirchnerism promoted fair redistribution of income and nationalization - to this end, Kirchnerism "openly defied the IMF and international creditors", restored price controls and state ownership of public utilities, increased the minimum wage, and removed legal restrictions from collective labor strikes.

Prevost and Campos argue that Kirchnerism was protectionist and state interventionist, much like Perón. The unique trait of Kirchnerism was its focus on anti-neoliberalism, postulating the need to move away from neoliberal Menemism and reverse its policies. It was also described as economically nationalist, and socialist. Kirchnerism, similarly to movements such as Lulism, is seen as a response and a counter to neoliberalism; some political scientists propose the term ‘Pink Tide neopopulism’ to describe such movements, as opposed to the neoliberal populism of the 1990s. Javier Franzé wrote: "Kirchnerism gave rise to a phase of wealth redistribution comparable only to Yrigoyenism and the initial Peronism, relying pragmatically on soybean income and debt payment to the IMF to achieve political independence."

On foreign policy, Kirchnerism displays nationalist and anti-Western tendencies, denouncing the United States and the IMF. Kirchnerist governments are allies of the Venezuelan presidents Hugo Chávez and Nicolas Maduro, and pursued economic and political ties with Venezuela as well as Cuba. This was combined with an anti-American rhetoric, as the Kirchnerist administrations accused the USA of interference in Latin American affairs, and strongly opposed the war on drugs, especially in the aspects that spilled over into Latin America. Both Nestor Kirchner and Cristina Fernandez de Kirchner "moved to break the popular conception that political parties and the government mainly heed the interests of the international creditors and global markets, not of the Argentinians"; because of this, Kirchnerism frequently targets "IMF, foreign and domestic capitalists, bondholders and the military" in both policies and rhetoric. Raimundo Frei Toledo argues that Kirchnerism "broke the ‘Washington consensus’ when, together with other leftist Latin American leaders (e.g. Chavez, Lula), he rejected the ALCA and disobeyed the IMF's guidelines, thereby enhancing national pride and connecting Argentina to the Latin American community."

== Transversalism ==
Unlike his predecessor Eduardo Duhalde, Kirchner was a Peronist that distrusted the Justicialist Party as a support for his government. He proposed instead a "transversalist" policy, seeking the support of progressive politicians regardless of their party. Thus he got support from factions of the Justicialist Party, the Radical Civic Union (which were called "Radicales K") and small centre-left parties.

Kirchner neglected the internal politics of the Justicialist Party and kept instead the Front for Victory party, which was initially an electoral alliance in his home province of Santa Cruz and in the 2003 elections premiered in the federal political scene. Some politicians favored by this policy were Aníbal Ibarra, mayor of Buenos Aires for the Broad Front and supported as Kirchnerist; and Julio Cobos, governor of Mendoza for the UCR and elected as Vice President of Fernández de Kirchner in 2007.

=== Decline ===
The transversalist project was eventually dismissed. Kirchner took control of the Justicialist Party and some "Radicales K", slowly returned to the "anti-K" faction of their party, most notably Vice President Julio Cobos and Governor of Catamarca province Eduardo Brizuela del Moral, while other very prominent Radical politicians remained in the "K" wing of the Radical Civic Union such as provincial governors Gerardo Zamora of Santiago del Estero, Ricardo Colombi of Corrientes and Miguel Saiz of Río Negro. After the 2011 general elections, several K radicals regretted having been part of that political space, turning once again to the opposition UCR. Such is the case of Miguel Saiz, former governor of Río Negro, who declared: "My commitment to the Concertación ended in December 2011".

=== Resurgence ===
In March 2015, dissatisfied with the UCR's alliance with Mauricio Macri's Republican Proposal (PRO), the National Alfonsinist Movement (MNA) led by Leopoldo Moreau joined the Front for Victory. For this reason, Ernesto Sanz, the president of the UCR, announced the expulsion of Moreau from the party. Professor Gustavo Melella was reelected as mayor of the city of Río Grande in 2015, through the FORJA Concertación Party. During the presidency of Alberto Fernández, Ricardo Alfonsin was appointed as the Ambassador to Spain.

== Election results ==
=== Presidency ===
Election year	Candidate	First round		Second round		Result	Note
Election year	Candidate	No. of votes	% vote	No. of votes	% vote	Result	Note
2003	Néstor Kirchner	4,312,517	22.25	Null	0	✓ 2nd-round unopposed	Within Front for Victory
2007	Cristina Kirchner	8,651,066	45.29			✓ Elected	Within Front for Victory
2011	Cristina Kirchner	11,865,055	54.11			✓ Elected	Within Front for Victory
2015	Daniel Scioli	9,338,490	37.08	12,317,330	48.66	✗ 2nd-round defeated	Within Front for Victory
2019	Alberto Fernandez	12,946,037	48.24			✓ Elected	Within Everyone's Front
2023	Sergio Massa	9,387,184	36.38	11,598,720	44.35	✗ 2nd-round defeated	Within Union for the Homeland

=== Chamber of Deputies ===
Election year	Votes	%	Seats won	Total seats	Position	Presidency	Note
2003	5,511,420	35.1	58 / 130	129 / 257	Majority	Eduardo Duhalde (PJ)	including the other PJ factions
2005	5,071,094	29.9	50 / 127	75 / 257	Minority	Néstor Kirchner (FPV—PJ)	
2007	5,557,087		56 / 130	106 / 257	Minority	Néstor Kirchner (FPV—PJ)	
2009	1,679,084	8.8	14 / 127	70 / 257	Minority	Cristina Kirchner (FPV—PJ)	
2011	10,121,311	49.1	76 / 130	90 / 257	Minority	Cristina Kirchner (FPV—PJ)	
2013	7,487,839	33.2	42 / 127	132 / 257	Majority	Cristina Kirchner (FPV—PJ)	
2015	8,237,074		60 / 130	96 / 257	Minority	Cristina Kirchner (FPV—PJ)	
2019	11,606,411	45.3	64 / 130	119 / 257	Minority	Alberto Fernández (FdT—PJ)	
2023	8,252,357	33.62	48 / 130	99 / 257	Minority	Sergio Massa (UP—FR)	

=== Senate ===
Election year	Votes	%	Seats won	Total seats	Position	Presidency	Note
2003	1,852,456	40.7	13 / 24	41 / 72	Majority	Eduardo Duhalde (PJ)	Including the other PJ factions
2005	3,572,361	45.1	14 / 24	14 / 72	Minority	Néstor Kirchner (FPV—PJ)	
2007	1,048,187		8 / 24	22 / 72	Minority	Néstor Kirchner (FPV—PJ)	
2009	756,695		4 / 24	12 / 72	Minority	Cristina Kirchner (FPV—PJ)	
2011	5,470,241	54.6	13 / 24	24 / 72	Minority	Cristina Kirchner (FPV—PJ)	
2013	1,608,866	32.1	11 / 24	40 / 72	Majority	Cristina Kirchner (FPV—PJ)	
2015	2,336,037	32.72	12 / 24	39 / 72	Majority	Cristina Kirchner (FPV—PJ)	
2019	2,263,221	40.16	13 / 24	39 / 72	Majority	Alberto Fernández (FdT—PJ)	
2021	7,47,,030	31.67	9 / 24	35 / 72	Majority	Alberto Fernández (FdT—PJ)	
2023	4,739,859	40.82	10 / 24	33 / 72	Minority	Sergio Massa (UP—FR)	

== Criticism ==
Kirchnerism has encountered opposition from various sectors of Argentine society, which tend to criticize its personalism. In 2012, there was a massive anti-Kirchnerism protest in several cities within Argentina and also in several Argentinian embassies around the world. It became known as 8N. In 2015, when Foreign Policy was discussing corruption in Latin America it was stated:

The viceroys of the colonial era set the pattern. They centralised power and bought the loyalty of local interest groups. ... Caudillos, dictators and elected presidents continued the tradition of personalising power. Venezuela's chavismo and the kirchnerismo of Ms Fernández are among today's manifestations.

In an editorial published in October 2015, The Economist expressed the following view about the situation in Argentina:

Argentina needs change. As Ms Fernández slips out of office the economy is starting to crumble. Currency controls and trade restrictions ... are choking productivity; inflation hovers at around 25%. ... Argentina cannot seek external financing until it ends its standoff with creditors who rejected a debt-restructuring plan. Unless the new president quickly reverses Ms Fernández's populist policies, a crisis is inevitable.

== See also ==
- Argentine nationalism
- Conflict between Kirchnerism and the media
- La Cámpora
- Left-wing populism
- Menemism
- Peronism
- Plural Consensus
- Politics of Argentina
- Public image of Cristina Fernández de Kirchner
