= Cele Fierro =

Argentine politician and activist

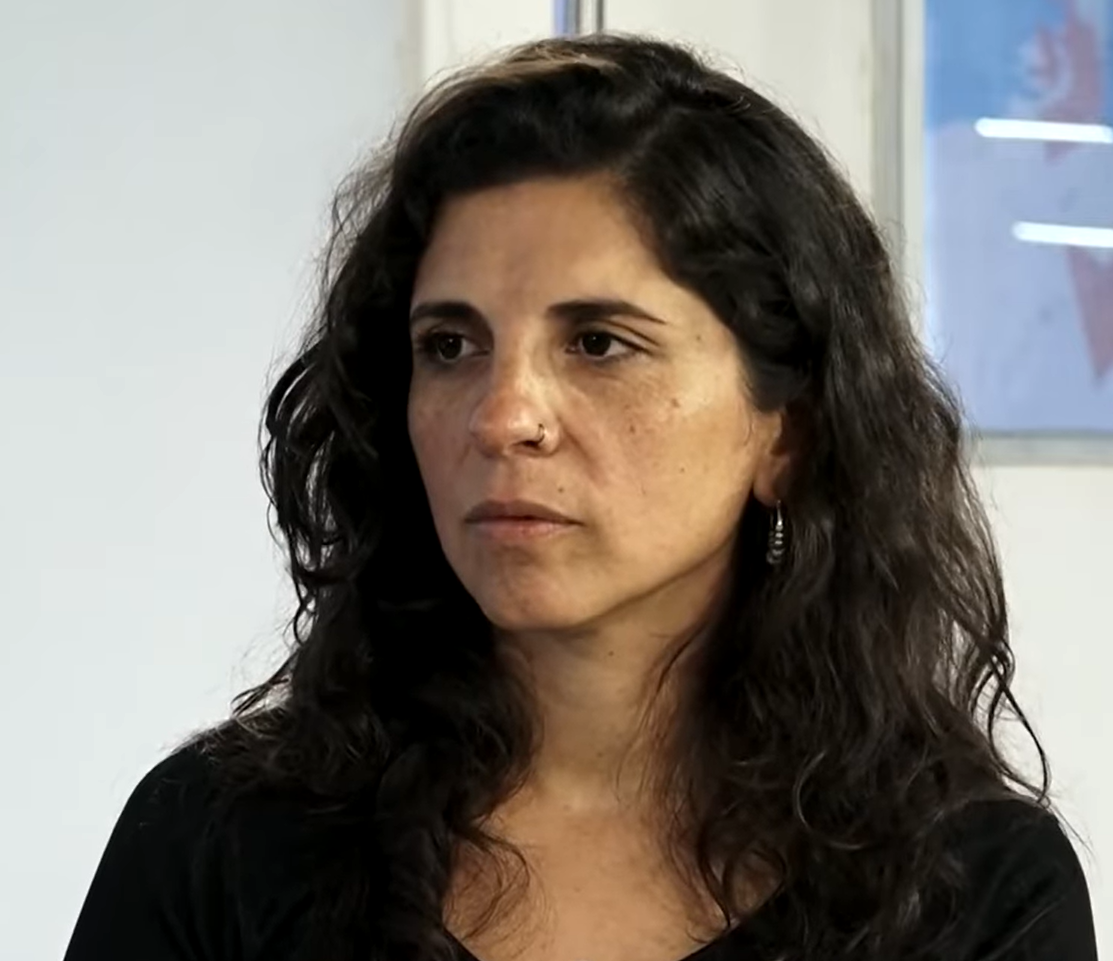
- Fierro in 2025

Member of the Buenos Aires City Legislature
- In office 10 December 2023 – 12 December 2024

Personal details
- Party: Workers' Socialist Movement
- Education: National University of Patagonia San Juan Bosco

María Celeste "Cele" Fierro is an Argentine politician and activist.

== Early life and education ==
She originally comes from Cordoba but now lives in Buenos Aires. She studied at the National University of Patagonia San Juan Bosco.

== Career ==
She was a member of the legislature of the Autonomous City of Buenos Aires (CABA) during 2023-24, as part of the rotation of posts by the Workers' Left Front.

=== Activism ===
She is active in campaigning for women's right to an abortion.

She took part in the Global Sumud Flotilla to break the siege of the Gaza Strip. On 1 October 2025 she was detained when Israeli forces attacked the Flotilla. She was released a few days later.

She will become a national deputy following the 2025 Argentine legislative election, as part of the rotation of seats by the Workers' Left Front.

She is taking part in the 2026 flotilla to Gaza. On 30 April 2026 she released a message on Facebook that she had been captured by Israeli forces in international waters.

=== Personal life ===
She has a daughter, Emilia.
