= Clara Muzzio =

Argentine politician

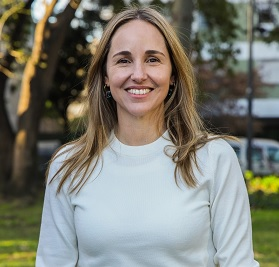
- Muzzio in 2023

Deputy Chief of Government of Buenos Aires
- Incumbent
- Assumed office 10 December 2023
- Preceded by: Diego Santilli

Ministry of Public Space and Urban Hygiene
- In office 10 December 2019 – 10 December 2023
- Preceded by: Eduardo Macchiavelli
- Succeeded by: Ignacio Baistrocchi

Personal details
- Born: María Clara Muzzio Diehl; 28 May 1981 (age 44) Buenos Aires, Argentina
- Party: Republican Proposal
- Other political affiliations: Juntos por el Cambio (since 2015)
- Spouse: Jorge Aguado
- Children: 3
- Education: University of Buenos Aires; University of San Andrés
- Occupation: Lawyer; politician

Clara Muzzio (born 28 May 1981) is an Argentine politician and lawyer who is the Deputy Chief of Government of Buenos Aires since 7 December 2023. She previously served as the Minister of Public Space and Urban Hygiene of Buenos Aires from 2021 to 2023.

== Early life and education ==
Muzzio was born on May 28, 1981, in Buenos Aires, Argentina. She was the forth child of Carlos Muzzio and Carola María Diehl Schindler. She studied law at the University of Buenos Aires, and attended a Master of Public Policy and Administration at the University of San Andrés.

Muzzio has two children with Marcelo José Naveira; Felicitas and Bernarda before her marriage to Jorge Aguado, having a third son, Benjamín.

== Political career ==
She had her first professional experience in politics by taking part in the Public Space Commission at Buenos Aires City Legislature, in 2008. Two years later, in 2010, chief of government Mauricio Macri named her Manager of Publicity and Use Permits of Buenos Aires Government, her first office in the public administration of the city. She resigned the post on December 31, 2011.

On September 1, 2013, she was designated by the Ministry of Environment and Public Space of the City of Buenos Aires to lead the project "Plan Microcentro", that aimed to renew street furniture, level streets to pedestrian height, bury waste containers, etcetera.

On January 1, 2014, she sworn in as Director of Urban Regeneration of Buenos Aires, until her next appointment to years later, on December 10, 2015, when newly elected mayor Rodríguez Larreta designated her Under Secretary of Pedestrian Space of the City of Buenos Aires. She served in this position for four years.

=== Ministry of Public Space and Urban Hygiene ===
On December 10, 2019, the Cabinet of Ministers of the City of Buenos Aires suffers many changes, as a result of the re-election of Horacio Rodríguez Larreta as chief of government, who designates Muzzio as Ministry of Public Space and Urban Hygiene.

The following four years as Ministry, Clara Muzzio had as her priorities the strengthening the plan BA Recycles, aiming to strengthen citizen commitment in waste separation and acquisition of sustainable habits, and the renovation of the historic centre of Buenos Aires.

=== Deputy Chief of Government of the City of Buenos Aires ===
On August 22, 2023, after winning the blanket primaries, Jorge Macri announced Clara Muzzio would join his electoral formula as candidate for Deputy Chief of Government of the City of Buenos Aires.

After the Macri-Muzzio formula won the general elections, and opposition candidate Leandro Santoro declined his candidacy before the second round, electoral victory was proclaimed. Clara Muzzio became then the new Deputy Chief of Government of Buenos Aires. On December 7, 2023, she sworn in

== Electoral history ==
Electoral history of Clara Muzzio
Election	Office	List	Votes			Result	Ref.
Election	Office	List	Total	%	P.	Result	Ref.
2023	Deputy Chief of Government of Buenos Aires	Together for Change	895,131	49.67%	1st	Elected	
