= Radicales K =

K Radicalism Radicales K
- Leader: Leopoldo Moreau; Gustavo Lopez
- Founded: 12 August 2006; 19 years ago
- Membership: FORJA Concertation Party; National Alfonsinist Movement
- Ideology: Kirchnerism; Radicalism; Democratic socialism; Social democracy; Progressivism
- Political position: Centre-left to left-wing
- National affiliation: Union for the Homeland (2023–present); Former: Frente de Todos (2019–2023); Citizen's Unity (2017–2019); Front for Victory (2006–2017)
- Seats in the Chamber of Deputies: 3 / 257
- Seats in the Senate: 0 / 72
- Province Governors: 1 / 24

K Radicalism, also known as Radicales K, were a faction within the Radical Civic Union (UCR), a political party in Argentina.

== History ==
=== Early history and foundation (early 2000s–2007) ===
President Néstor Kirchner (2003–2007) was a Peronist but distrusted the Justicialist Party (PJ) as a support for his government. He proposed instead a "transversalist" policy, seeking the support of progressive politicians regardless of their party. He thus formed the Front for Victory and got support from factions of the PJ, the UCR and small centre-left parties. Those Radicals who supported Kirchner were called Radicales K. On Saturday, August 12, 2006, the governors and 183 radical mayors from all over the country met at the Federal Meeting: the Radicalism That Governs, where an internal current called the Federal Radical Movement was founded, which proposed dialogue and agreement with the national government. There, Julio Cobos (then, Governor of Mendoza and later Vice President of the Nation) used the term Radicales K for the first time in his speech. The Radicales K included, among others aside from Julio Cobos are Arturo Colombi, Miguel Saiz, Gerardo Zamora and Eduardo Brizuela del Moral.

=== Decline of the transveralist project and reorganization (2007–2011) ===
The transversalist project was eventually dismissed, and Kirchner and his wife Cristina Fernández, who became president in 2007, chose to fight for the control of the PJ instead. Kirchner took control of the PJ, and some "Radicales K" slowly returned to the "Anti-K" faction of their party, most notably vice-president Julio Cobos, who voted against a bill that was supported by the government in 2008 and Governor of Catamarca province Eduardo Brizuela del Moral; while other very prominent Radical politicians remained in the "K" wing of the Radical Civic Union, such as provincial governors Gerardo Zamora of Santiago del Estero, Ricardo Colombi of Corrientes and Miguel Saiz of Río Negro.

=== Reorganization ===
After the crisis of the 2009 elections, a part of the K Radicals decided to continue their alliance with the government of Cristina Fernández de Kirchner. Organized in the FORJA Concertación Party, chaired by Silvia Vázquez. Until mid-2010 they had the support of several leaders of radical origin, among them the governor of the province of Santiago del Estero, Gerardo Zamora, and the secretary general of the Presidency, Gustavo López. It was founded first as the Concertación Party, to later add the term FORJA in 2010, reviving the name of an old political space of radicalism from the 1950s.

=== Decline ===
After the 2011 general elections, several K radicals regretted having been part of that political space, turning once again to the opposition UCR. Such is the case of Miguel Saiz, former governor of Río Negro, who declared: "My commitment to the Concertación ended in December 2011".

=== Resurgence ===
In March 2015, dissatisfied with the UCR's alliance with Mauricio Macri's Republican Proposal (PRO), the National Alfonsinist Movement (MNA) led by Leopoldo Moreau joined the Front for Victory. For this reason, Ernesto Sanz, the president of the UCR, announced the expulsion of Moreau from the party, That same year, the MNA officialized its incorporation into the Front for Victory in an event in which President Cristina Fernández de Kirchner took part. Professor Gustavo Melella was reelected as mayor of the city of Río Grande in 2015, through the FORJA Concertación Party. During the presidency of Alberto Fernández, Ricardo Alfonsin (who ironically faced against Fernández de Kirchner in the 2011 presidential election) was appointed as the Ambassador to Spain.

== See also ==
- Kirchnerism
- Plural Consensus
- Front for Victory
