= Soledad Martínez =

Argentine politician (born 1982)

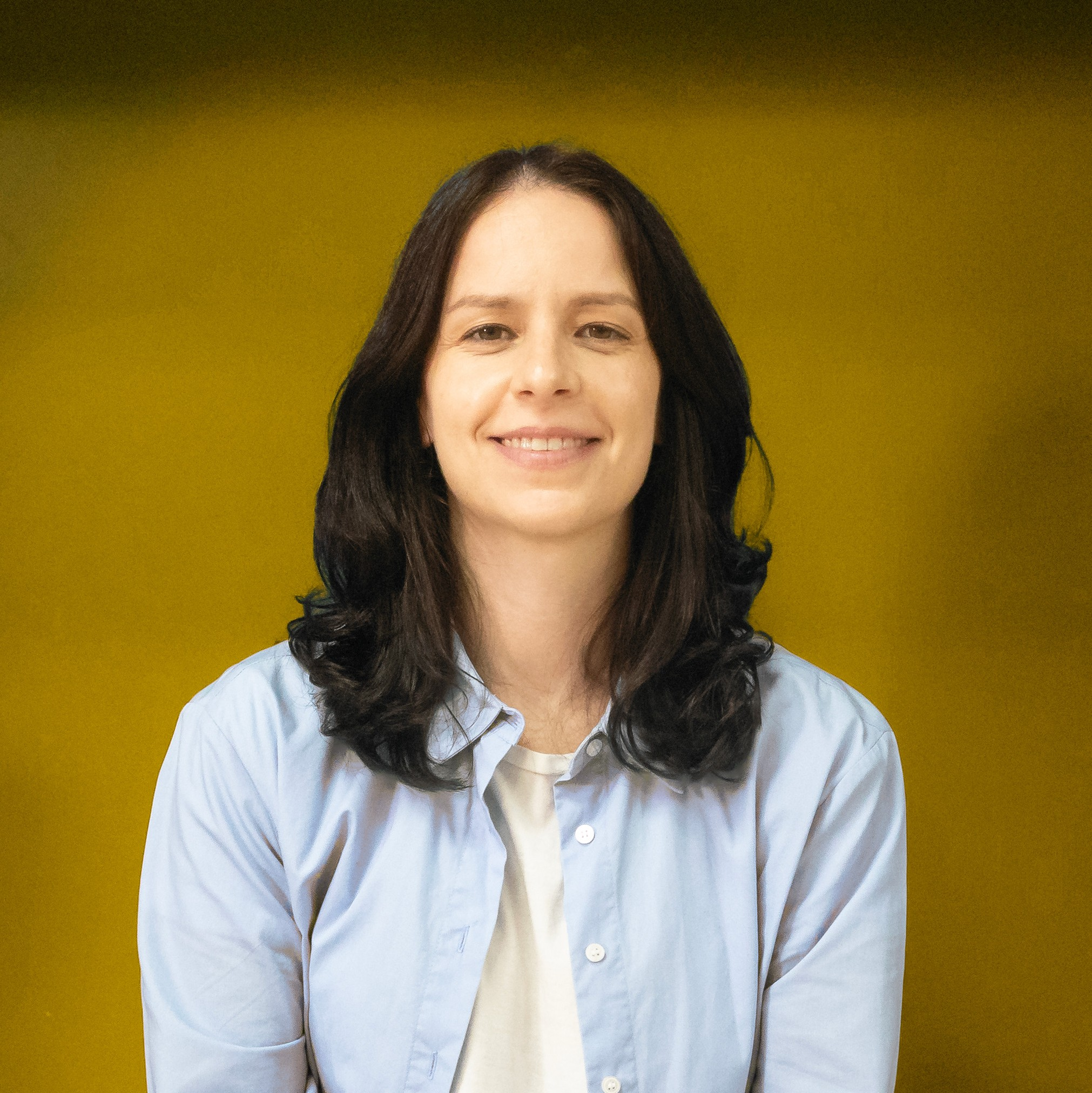

Mayor of Vicente López
- Incumbent
- Assumed office 1 December 2021; Interim: 1 December 2021 – 1 June 2023
- Preceded by: Jorge Macri

National Deputy
- In office 10 December 2009 – 10 December 2017
- Constituency: Buenos Aires

Personal details
- Born: 14 September 1982 (age 43) Ciudad Jardín Lomas del Palomar, Argentina
- Party: Commitment to Change (2007–2008); Republican Proposal (since 2008)
- Other political affiliations: Juntos por el Cambio (since 2015)

Soledad Martínez (born 14 September 1982) is an Argentine politician who is the current intendenta (mayor) of Vicente López Partido, in Buenos Aires Province. She is a member of Republican Proposal (PRO).

Martínez previously served as a National Deputy elected in Buenos Aires Province from 2009 to 2017.

== Early life and career ==
Martínez was born in Buenos Aires on 14 September 1982 and grew up in Ciudad Jardín, Buenos Aires, where she completed her primary and secondary education. While her family identifies with Peronism, she does not consider herself a Peronist.

Her political involvement began in 2002 following Argentina's economic crisis, when she joined the Fundación Creer y Crecer and met Jorge Macri, a future leader of the Republican Proposal (PRO) party. Between 2010 and 2013, she served as national president of Jóvenes PRO, the party's youth wing.

== Political career ==
In the 2007 elections, she ran as a councilor candidate in Tres de Febrero Partido, supporting Francisco de Narváez's gubernatorial campaign, and won a seat. She became president of PRO's bloc in the local council. For the 2009 legislative elections, she was the 13th candidate on Unión PRO national deputy list for Buenos Aires Province, led by De Narváez. The list received 34.58% of votes, securing her a seat in Congress, which she assumed on 10 December 2009.

During the 2011 elections, she served as campaign manager for Jorge Macri's successful mayoral bid in Vicente López, where she subsequently relocated. In the 2013 legislative elections, through an agreement between PRO and the Renewal Front, she ran alongside Sergio Massa and other PRO figures, winning a seat with 43.95% of votes in 6th position.

In 2017, she headed Cambiemos' councilor list in Vicente López with Jorge Macri's support, becoming the most voted councilor candidate in Buenos Aires Province with 60.82% of votes. She led the ruling party's bloc in the council. In February 2019, she resigned her council seat to become Secretary of Social Development in Vicente López municipality.

=== Mayor of Vicente López ===
She ran as Jorge Macri's running mate in the 2019 mayoral campaign for Juntos por el Cambio, winning with 62.54% of votes. She served as councilor and bloc leader until December 2021, when she became interim mayor upon Macri's resignation to become Cabinet Chief for Horacio Rodríguez Larreta. On 1 June 2023, following Jorge Macri's official resignation, she became the mayor of Vicente López.

In the August 2023 primary elections (PASO), she was one of two candidates in Buenos Aires Province to receive support from both Juntos por el Cambio presidential candidates, Horacio Rodríguez Larreta and Patricia Bullrich. She won the October 2023 general election with 49.87% of votes.

On 19 March 2024, she assumed the position of PRO Vice President under Mauricio Macri's leadership.

== Electoral history ==
=== Executive ===
Electoral history of Soledad Martínez
Election	Office	List	Votes			Result	Ref.
Election	Office	List	Total	%	P.	Result	Ref.
2023	Mayor of Vicente López	Together for Change	86,444	49.84%	1st	Elected	

=== Legislative ===
Electoral history of Soledad Martínez
Election	Office	List	#	District	Votes			Result	Ref.
Election	Office	List	#	District	Total	%	P.	Result	Ref.
2007	Councillor	PRO Union	2	Tres de Febrero Partido	18,576	10.84%	3rd (Note: Presented on an electoral list. The data shown represents the share of the vote the entire party/alliance received in that constituency.)	Elected	
2009	National Deputy	PRO Union	13	Buenos Aires Province	2,606,632	34.68%	1st	Elected	
2013	National Deputy	Renewal Front	6	Buenos Aires Province	3,943,056	43.95%	1st	Elected	
2017	Councillor	Cambiemos	1	Vicente López Partido	110,585	60.81%	1st	Elected	
2019	Councillor	Together for Change	1	Vicente López Partido	116,048	62.49%	1st	Elected	

Political offices
Preceded by Jorge Macri	Mayor of Vicente López; 2021–present	Incumbent
