= Silvia Lospennato =

Argentine politician

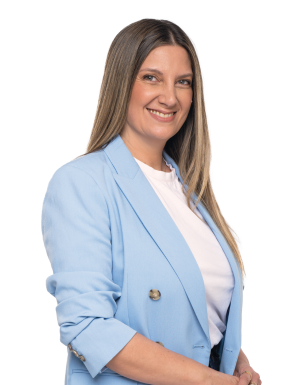
- Official portrait, 2023

National Deputy
- Incumbent
- Assumed office 10 December 2015
- Constituency: Buenos Aires

Personal details
- Born: 21 December 1977 (age 48) Buenos Aires, Argentina
- Party: Republican Proposal
- Other political affiliations: Juntos por el Cambio (2015–present)
- Education: University of Buenos Aires

Silvia Gabriela Lospennato (born 21 December 1977) is an Argentine political scientist and politician, currently serving as National Deputy elected in Buenos Aires Province since 2015. She is a member of Republican Proposal (PRO).

Lospennato was previously Undersecretary of Government in the City of Buenos Aires during the mayoralty of Mauricio Macri.

== Early life and education ==
Lospennato was born on 21 December 1977 in Buenos Aires. She studied Political Science at the University of Buenos Aires Faculty of Social Sciences, graduating in 2003, and has a degree on Technology and Environmental Law from the Instituto Tecnológico de Buenos Aires. She is married and has two children.

== Political career ==
Lospennato began her career in the City Government of Buenos Aires during the administration of Mauricio Macri. Up until 2014, she was in charge of the Special Projects Unit of the Matanza Riachuelo Basin Authority (ACUMAR). Later, from January to December 2015, she was Undersecretary of Government of Buenos Aires.

She ran for a seat in the Chamber of Deputies in the 2015 legislative election, as the first candidate in the Cambiemos list in Buenos Aires Province. She was initially supposed to be the second candidate in the list, until the resignation of Fernando Niembro from the position. The list came second with 33.75% of the vote, and Lospennato was elected. She was re-elected in 2019, this time as the fourth candidate in the Juntos por el Cambio list.

As a national deputy, Lospennato was a vocal supporter of the legalization of abortion in Argentina. She voted in favour of the two Voluntary Interruption of Pregnancy bills that were debated by the Argentine Congress in 2018 and 2020. Her closing speech during the 2018 debate was highlighted by Brut Magazine as one of the decade's "best feminist speeches".

In 2023, she ran as a pre-candidate for national deputy in the Province of Buenos Aires, a ticket headed by the Peronist Miguel Ángel Pichetto, with Horacio Rodríguez Larreta as a pre-candidate for president. Finally, she was elected as a deputy on the Juntos por el Cambio list.

In June 2024, she voted in favor of the "Bases" Law. In August 2024, she voted against the University Financing Law. She was absent when the Retirement Mobility Law was passed, but later voted in favour of the presidential veto, for which she was invited to a celebration at the Quinta de Olivos.

At the end of March 2025 the Pro announced that Lospennato would be its first candidate for Buenos Aires City Legislator.

In April 2025, she voted against the formation of an investigative commission for the Cryptogate.

She was one of the main proponents of the "Ficha Limpia" bill, which would prevent people convicted for corruption crimes from running for elected office. The initiative was debated multiple times in the Chamber of Deputies, although it was never passed. In November 2024, the session to discuss the bill failed to produce a quorum, despite Lospennato's repeated efforts to place it on the legislative agenda. Finally, in February 2025, the Chamber of Deputies approved the bill with broad multiparty support, but in May of that same year it was rejected by the Argentine Senate by a single vote. Lospennato harshly criticized the outcome and reaffirmed her commitment to the fight for higher standards of integrity.

== Electoral history ==
Electoral history of Silvia Lospennato
Election	Office	List	#	District	Votes			Result	Ref.
Election	Office	List	#	District	Total	%	P.	Result	Ref.
2015	National Deputy	Cambiemos	1	Buenos Aires Province	3,037,552	33.75%	2nd (Note: Presented on an electoral list. The data shown represents the share of the vote the entire party/alliance received in that constituency.)	Elected	
2019	National Deputy	Juntos por el Cambio	4	Buenos Aires Province	3,668,580	37.77%	2nd	Elected	
2023	National Deputy	Juntos por el Cambio	4	Buenos Aires Province	2,484,593	26.53%	2nd	Elected	
2025	City Legislator	Buenos Aires First	1	City of Buenos Aires	261,595	15.92%	3rd	Elected	
