= Gisela Marziotta =

Argentine journalist and politician

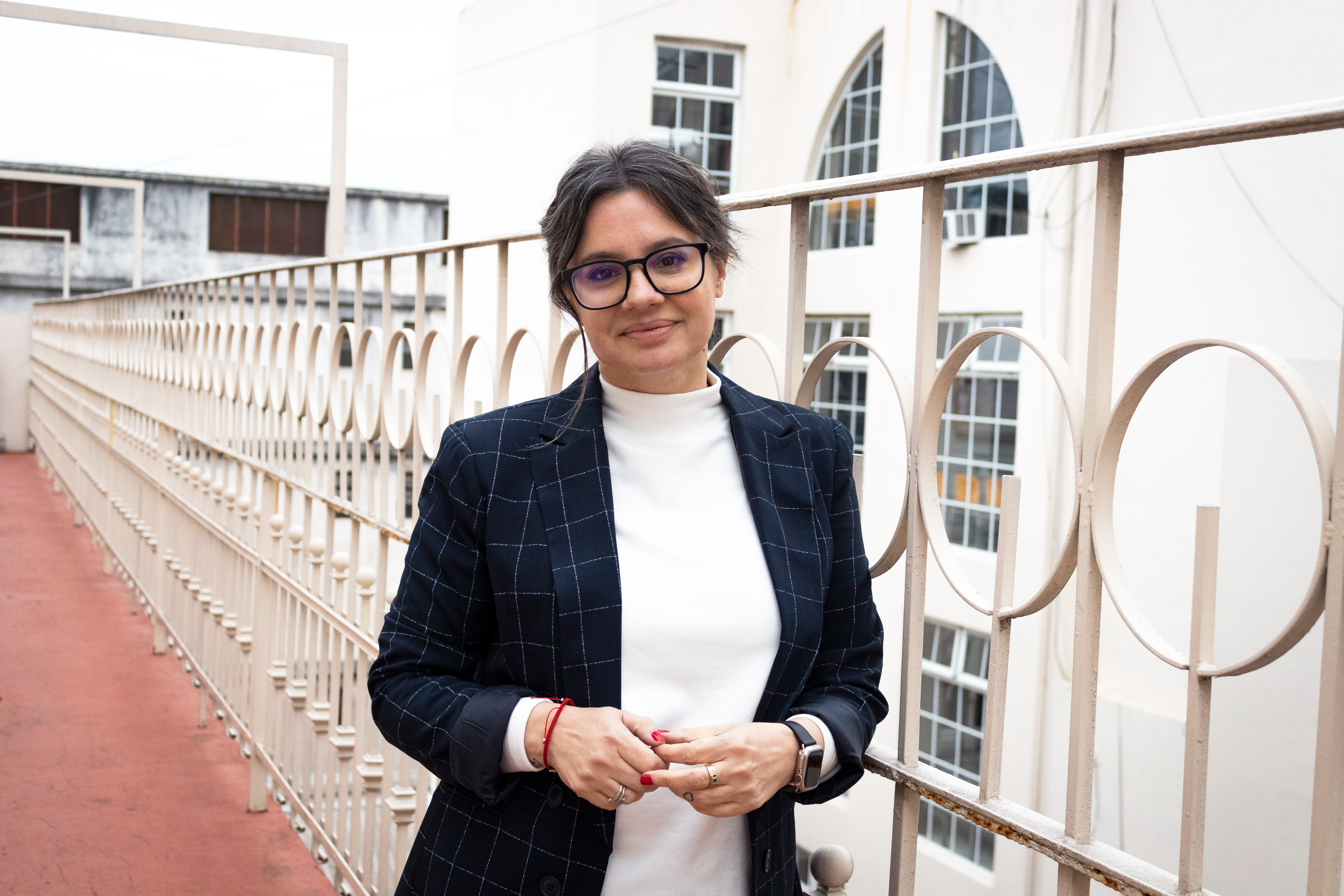

National Deputy
- In office 29 January 2020 – 10 December 2025
- Constituency: City of Buenos Aires

Personal details
- Born: 19 March 1975 (age 51) Bahía Blanca, Argentina
- Party: Independent
- Other political affiliations: Unidad Porteña (2017); Frente de Todos (since 2019)
- Education: University of Buenos Aires
- Profession: Journalist, writer, politician

Gisela Marziotta (born 19 March 1975) is an Argentine journalist, writer, and politician. She served as a member of the Argentine Chamber of Deputies representing the Autonomous City of Buenos Aires from 2020 to 2025.

== Early life and education ==
Marziotta was born on 19 March 1975 in Bahía Blanca. Her family moved to Buenos Aires when she was 2 years old. She studied journalism at Taller Escuela Agencia and political science at the University of Buenos Aires. In the 90s she began her political involvement in the Radical Civic Union.

== Political career ==
Marziotta was the 5th candidate in the Buenos Aires City Unidad Porteña list to the Argentine Chamber of Deputies in the 2017 legislative election. The list received 21.74% of the popular vote, and Marziotta was not elected; however, on 23 December 2019, Daniel Filmus (the first candidate in the list) stepped down from his seat in order to be appointed as Secretary of Malvinas Affairs in the Alberto Fernández administration, and Marziotta was sworn in accordingly in Filmus's place. She took office on 29 January 2020.

In the 2019 Buenos Aires city election, Marziotta was the Deputy Chief of Government candidate in the Frente de Todos ticket, under Matías Lammens. The ticket received 35.07% of the popular vote, trailing behind the winning Juntos por el Cambio ticket of Horacio Rodríguez Larreta and Diego Santilli.

== Electoral history ==
=== Executive ===
Electoral history of Gisela Marziotta
Election	Office	List	Votes			Result	Ref.
Election	Office	List	Total	%	P.	Result	Ref.
2019	Deputy Chief of Government of Buenos Aires	Frente de Todos	687,026	35.07%	2nd	Not elected	

=== Legislative ===
Electoral history of Gisela Marziotta
Election	Office	List	#	District	Votes			Result	Ref.
Election	Office	List	#	District	Total	%	P.	Result	Ref.
2017	National Deputy	Unidad Porteña	6	City of Buenos Aires	419,176	21.74%	2nd (Note: Presented on an electoral list. The data shown represents the share of the vote the entire party/alliance received in that constituency.)	Not elected (Note: Assumed office on 23 December 2019 following the resignation of Daniel Filmus.)	
2021	National Deputy	Frente de Todos	2	City of Buenos Aires	461,514	25.06%	2nd	Elected	

== Publications ==
Marziotta has authored or co-authored some of the following books and publications:

- Contrato de señoritas: ni putas ni sumisas. Vergara. 2006. ISBN 978-950-15-2377-5.
- Adicta. Ediciones B. 2007. ISBN 978-950-15-2377-5.
- Nueve meses sin censura - El embarazo en la mujer actual. Grijalbo. 2011. ISBN 978-950-28-0555-9.
- Mejor muertos. Planeta. 2015. ISBN 978-950-49-4857-5. (co-authored with Mariano Hamilton)
- Amores bajo fuego. Planeta. 2018. ISBN 978-950-49-6237-3.
- Juan Perón, ese hombre. Ediciones Octubre. 2019. ISBN 978-987-3957-38-3. (co-authored with María Seoane)
