= Leopoldo Moreau =

Argentine politician (born 1946)

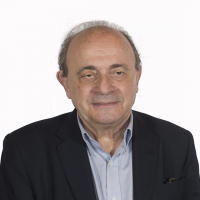
- Moreau in 2021

National Deputy
- In office 10 December 2017 – 10 December 2025
- Constituency: Buenos Aires
- In office 10 December 2001 – 10 December 2005
- Constituency: Buenos Aires
- In office 10 December 1983 – 10 December 1995
- Constituency: Buenos Aires

President of the Chamber of Deputies
- In office 3 April 1989 – 6 June 1989
- Preceded by: Juan Carlos Pugliese
- Succeeded by: Alberto Pierri

National Senator
- In office 10 December 1995 – 10 December 2001
- Constituency: Buenos Aires

Personal details
- Born: 5 November 1946 (age 79) Rosario, Argentina
- Party: Radical Civic Union (1960–2014); National Alfonsinist Movement (2014–present)
- Other political affiliations: Alliance (1997–2001); Front for Victory (2015–2017); Frente de Todos (2019–present)
- Children: 5
- Education: University of Buenos Aires

Leopoldo Raúl Guido Moreau (born 5 November 1946) is an Argentine journalist and politician. A prominent member of the Radical Civic Union throughout most of his career, Moreau later aligned himself with the administration of former president Cristina Fernández de Kirchner, breaking with his party, founding the National Alfonsinist Movement and becoming one of the most prominent Radicales K. He served in both houses of the Argentine National Congress uninterruptedly from 1983 to 2005, and again as a National Deputy from 2017 to 2025. He also briefly served as President of the Chamber of Deputies 1989.

== Early life and education ==
Leopoldo Raúl Guido Moreau was born on 5 November 1946 in Rosario, in Santa Fe Province, but grew up in San Isidro, in the Greater Buenos Aires conurbation. His father was an engineer who worked in the Argentine Navy, and his grandfather was a jeweller. Both of Moreau's parents died when he was 14.

He studied law at the University of Buenos Aires, though he dropped out in his fourth year and instead began working as a journalist.

== Political career in the UCR ==
Moreau joined the Radical Civic Union (UCR) in 1960, when he was 14. In 1968, he was one of the founding members of the Junta Coordinadora Nacional, an inner youth current within the party, and the Franja Morada, the UCR's student wing. Later, in 1972, he participated in the formation of the Renovation and Change Current, another group within the UCR led by Raúl Alfonsín.

=== First terms as deputy ===
In 1983, upon the fall of the last military dictatorship in Argentina, Moreau ran for a seat in the Chamber of Deputies. Upon his election, he served as president of the parliamentary commission on communication and as vice-president of the UCR bloc.

Toward the end of the 1980s, Moreau became leader of the Radical Committee of Buenos Aires Province. Due to his closeness with then-president Raúl Alfonsín, Moreau was one of the government's spokespeople during the 1987 Carapintadas uprising. From April to June 1989, Moreau was president of the Chamber of Deputies.

He was re-elected to the Chamber in 1987 and 1991. Moreau played a prominent role in the establishment and development of the National Commission on the Disappearance of Persons (CONADEP), the commission created to investigate the fate of the desaparecidos (victims of forced disappearance) and other human rights violations during the dictatorship.

In 1995, Moreau was elected to the National Senate by the Legislature of Buenos Aires Province, where he became part of the parliamentary commissions on budget and treasury affairs, accords, culture and education. From 1995 to 2001, he was the first vice-president of the Senate. During his time as Senator, Moreau was a staunch opponent of the neoliberal economic policies of President Carlos Menem.

=== Presidential run ===
Moreau was the UCR's presidential candidate in the 2003 general election, having won the party's nomination over Rodolfo Terragno. During the campaign, Moreau apologized to the Argentine society at large for the party's inner strife. The economic crisis, the December 2001 riots and the subsequent resignation of President Fernando de la Rúa had all contributed to a considerable loss of support for the party, and on election day, Moreau received merely 2.34% of the popular vote.

== Leader of the MNA ==
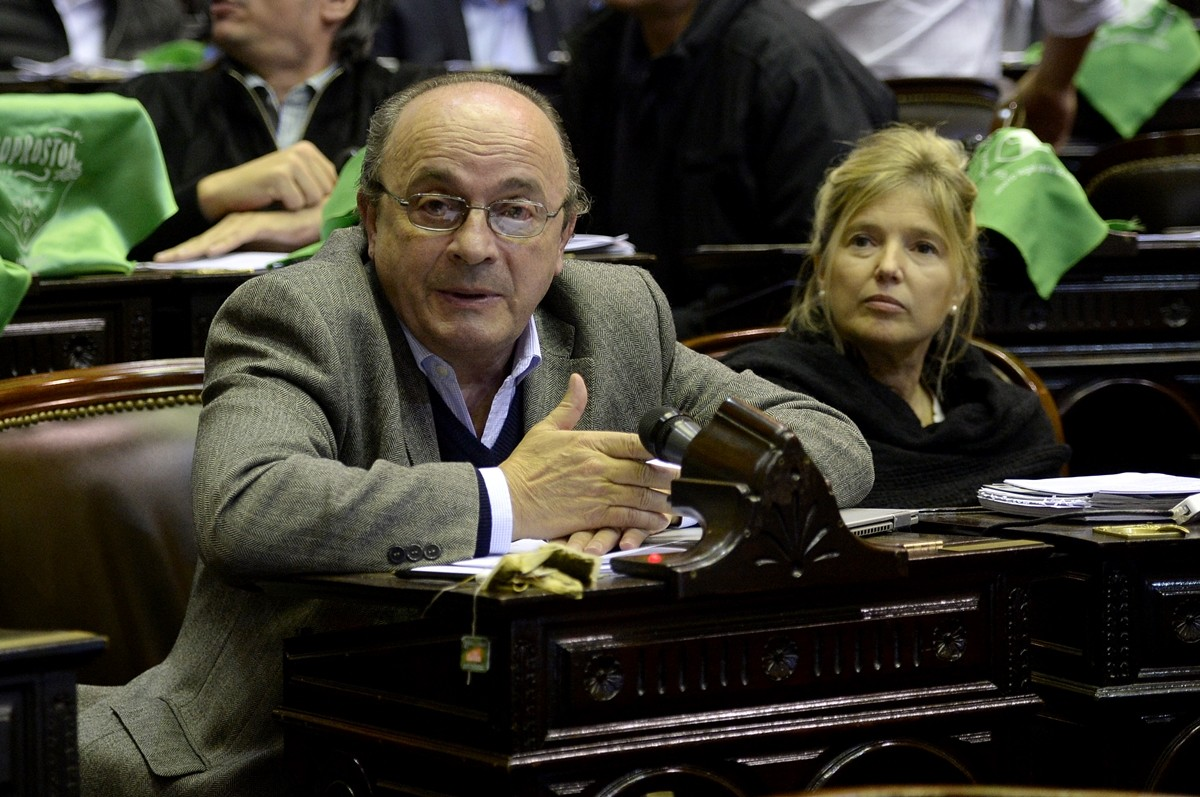
Moreau during the 2018 debate on the legalization of abortion in Argentina.

In 2014, Moreau and the Movement for Social Democracy (MODESO; an inner current within the UCR) founded the National Alfonsinist Movement (MNA), seeking to break away from the main party line and join forces with the Front for Victory. The following year, the UCR ethics committee expelled Moreau for "ethical and moral misconduct". That same year, the MNA officialized its incorporation into the Front for Victory in an event in which President Cristina Fernández de Kirchner took part.

At the 2017 legislative election, Moreau was the 8th candidate in the Unidad Ciudadana list to the Chamber of Deputies in Buenos Aires Province. The list received 36.28% of the votes, and Moreau was comfortably elected. Since 2019, Moreau has been part of the Frente de Todos parliamentary bloc.

As deputy, Moreau voted in favor of the legalization of abortion in Argentina twice: in 2018, when the bill passed the Chamber of Deputies but was struck down by the Senate, and again in 2020, when the bill passed both houses and abortion was effectively legalized. During the 2020 debate, Moreau spoke on how his decision was influenced by the clandestine abortion practiced by his daughter Cecilia, a fellow member of the Chamber of Deputies.

== Personal life ==
Moreau was married to María del Carmen Banzas, with whom he has five children, two of which are active in politics: Cecilia (born 1976) serves in the Chamber of Deputies alongside Moreau, while Carmela (born 1982) is presently an advisor at the Office of the Cabinet Chief.

In January 2021, while at a coffeehouse near the Congressional Palace, Moreau was insulted and violently threatened by two unidentified men. One of the men allegedly threw a chair at Moreau, while the other filmed the incident on his phone. One of the men was taken into custody by authorities and the incident is currently being investigated.

== Electoral history ==
=== Executive ===
Electoral history of Leopoldo Moreau
Election	Office	List	Votes			Result	Ref.
Election	Office	List	Total	%	P.	Result	Ref.
2003	President of Argentina	Radical Civic Union	453,373	2.34%	6th	Not elected	

=== Legislative ===
Electoral history of Leopoldo Moreau
Election	Office	List	#	District	Votes			Result	Ref.
Election	Office	List	#	District	Total	%	P.	Result	Ref.
1983	National Deputy	Radical Civic Union	12	Buenos Aires Province	2,743,064	49.38%	1st (Note: Presented on an electoral list. The data shown represents the share of the vote the entire party/alliance received in that constituency.)	Elected	
1985	National Deputy	Radical Civic Union	12	Buenos Aires Province	2,381,787	41.46%	1st	Elected	
1991	National Deputy	Radical Civic Union	4	Buenos Aires Province	1,359,954	23.12%	2nd	Elected	
2001	National Deputy	Alliance	1	Buenos Aires Province	814,551	15.35%	2nd	Elected	
2017	National Deputy	Unidad Ciudadana	8	Buenos Aires Province	3,383,114	36.28%	2nd	Elected	
2021	National Deputy	Frente de Todos	6	Buenos Aires Province	3,444,446	38.59%	2nd	Elected	

Political offices
Preceded by Juan Carlos Pugliese	President of the Chamber of Deputies; April 1989 – June 1989	Succeeded by Alberto Pierri
