= National Alfonsinist Movement =

Political party in Argentina

National Alfonsinist Movement Movimiento Nacional Alfonsinista
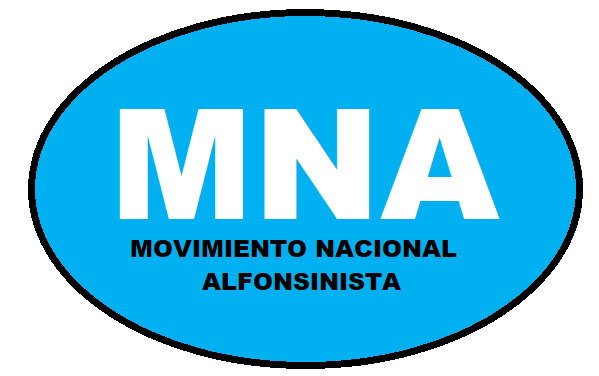
- Abbreviation: MNA
- Leader: Leopoldo Moreau
- Founder: Leopoldo Moreau
- Founded: 11 December 2014; 10 years ago
- Split from: Radical Civic Union
- Ideology: K Radicalism; Social democracy Alfonsínism
- Political position: Centre-left
- National affiliation: Homeland Force
- Seats in the Chamber of Deputies: 2 / 257
- Seats in the Senate: 0 / 72

The National Alfonsinist Movement (Spanish: Movimiento Nacional Alfonsinista, MNA) is a centre-left political party in Argentina with an Alfonsinist and Kirchnerist ideology. It was founded in 2014, and was member of the Front for Victory in 2015, Citizen's Unity in 2017, the Frente de Todos in 2019 and the Unión por la Patria in 2023. It integrates the political field of Kirchnerism.

== History ==
In 2014 the MNA split from the Radical Civic Union (UCR) and joined the Front for Victory. This rupture of the UCR materialized through a three-day congress held in Parque Norte in the City of Buenos Aires. In March 2015, Ernesto Sanz, the president of the UCR, announced the expulsion of Moreau from the party.

In 2017, the MNA was part of the founding parties of the Citizen Unity alliance to compete in the 2017 legislative elections.

== Electoral performance ==
=== Chamber of Deputies ===
Election year	Votes	%	seats won	total seats	position	notes
2017	5,265,069	21.03 (#2nd)	1	2 / 257	Minority	within Citizen's Unity
2019	11,359,508	45.50 (#1st)	1	2 / 257	Minority	within Frente de Todos
