= Workers' Socialist Movement (Argentina) =

Political party in Argentina

Workers' Socialist Movement Movimiento Socialista de los Trabajadores
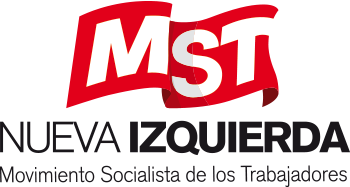
- Abbreviation: MST
- Leader: Vilma Ripoll, Alejandro Bodart
- General Secretary: Alejandro Bodart
- Founded: 1992
- Split from: Movement for Socialism
- Headquarters: Perú 439, Buenos Aires
- Newspaper: Alternativa Socialista
- Youth wing: Juventud Socialista del MST
- Membership (2017): 39,507
- Ideology: Communism; Trotskyism; Morenism
- Political position: Far-left
- National affiliation: Workers' Left Front

Website
- www.mst.org.ar

The Workers' Socialist Movement (Spanish: Movimiento Socialista de los Trabajadores, MST) is a Trotskyist political party in Argentina. The MST was founded in 1992 as a split from another Trotskyist group, the Movement Towards Socialism (see Nahuel Moreno). The MST is active on a number of college campuses, including the University of Buenos Aires. In 2006, the party has suffered a crisis, which led to a split. The minority founded a new organization, named Socialist Left.

Leading members include Cele Fierro and Alejandro Bodart.

Internationally, it is affiliated to the International Socialist League (2019).
