= Socialist Left (Argentina) =

Political party in Argentina

Socialist Left Izquierda Socialista
- Abbreviation: IS
- Founded: 21 September 2006; 20 years ago
- Split from: MST
- Headquarters: Buenos Aires, Argentina
- Newspaper: El Socialista
- Youth wing: Juventud de Izquierda Socialista
- Women's wing: Isadora
- Membership (2017): ▲30,523
- Ideology: Communism; Trotskyism
- Political position: Far-left
- National affiliation: Workers' Left Front
- International affiliation: International Workers' Unity – Fourth International
- Colours: Red
- Seats in the Chamber of Deputies: 1 / 257
- Seats in the Senate: 0 / 72

Website
- izquierdasocialista.org.ar

Socialist Left (Spanish: Izquierda Socialista; IS), officially registered as the Left for a Socialist Option (Izquierda por una Opción Socialista), is a Trotskyist political party in Argentina. It was founded in 2006 as a split from the Socialist Workers' Movement. It is the Argentine section of International Workers' Unity – Fourth International. It is one of four parties that make up the Workers' Left Front.

Members include Liliana Olivero, a former deputy in the provincial legislature in Córdoba Province, Argentina, Angélica Lagunas, a provincial deputy in Neuquén Province, Mercedes de Mendieta, a deputy in the Autonomous City of Buenos Aires, and Graciela Calderón, a deputy in Buenos Aires Province.
