= Adolfo Carranza =

Argentine lawyer, public official, historian, and writer

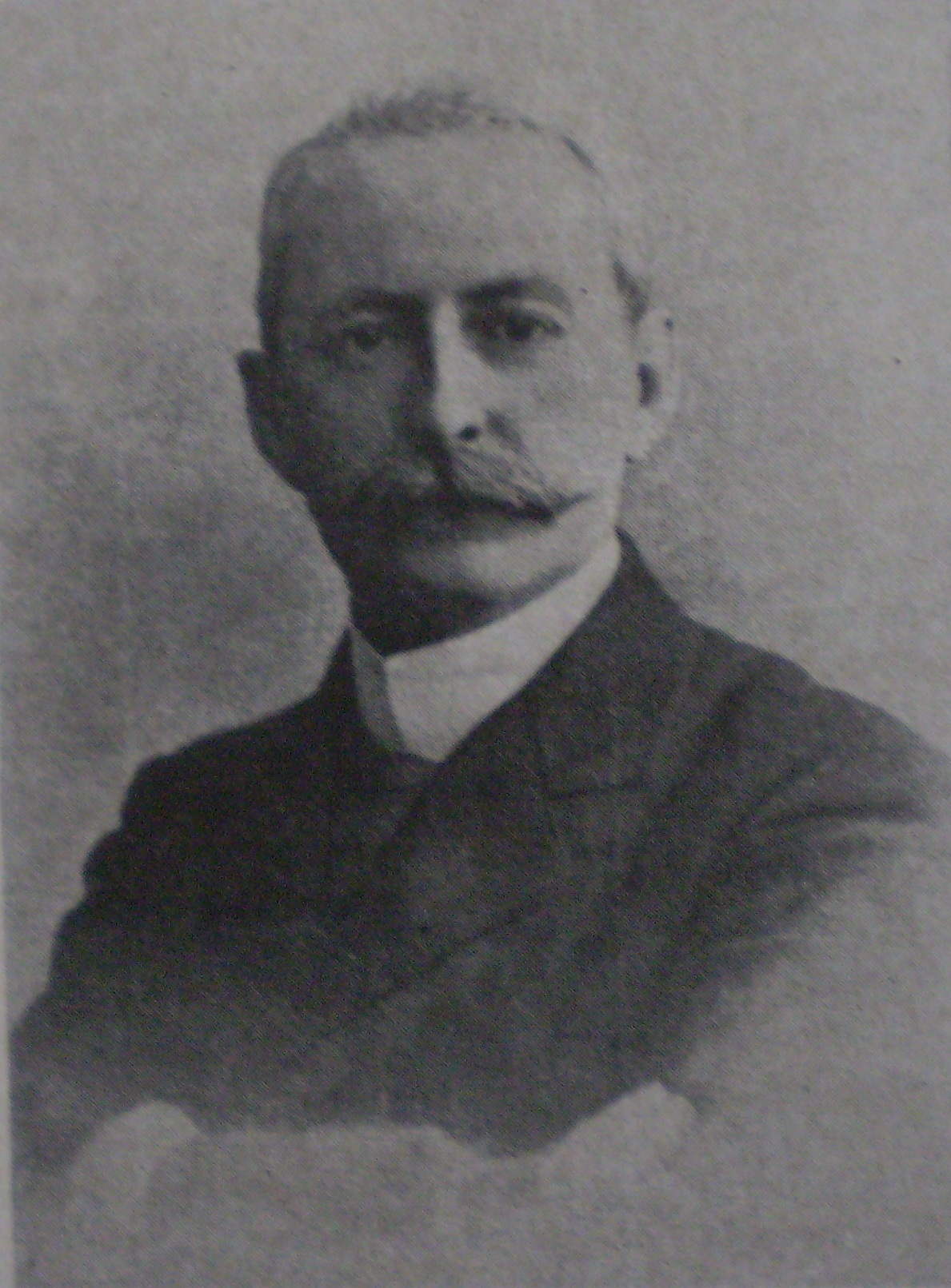
Adolfo Carranza

Adolfo Carranza (August 7, 1857 – August 15, 1914) was an Argentine lawyer, public official, historian, and writer who established the National Historical Museum.

== Life and times ==
Adolfo Pedro Carranza was born in Buenos Aires to María Eugenia del Mármol and Adolfo Carranza. He enrolled at the University of Buenos Aires Law School, earning a juris doctor, and in 1880 married Carmen García Lara, with whom he had one daughter.

Carranza entered public service, and was appointed Economic Affairs Attaché to the Argentine Embassy in Paraguay. He later served as Section Chief for the Interior Ministry. Carranza, during the late 1880s, developed a correspondence with numerous relatives of key figures and veterans of the Argentine War of Independence. He collected a wide variety of vintage weapons, documents, memorabilia, furniture and other items related to the 1810 — 21 struggle, and was later given purview over similar artifacts already on display at the Museo Público.

His initiative resulted in the establishment of Museo Histórico de la Capital (Historical Museum of the Capital) by Mayor Francisco Seeber on May 24, 1889, and with Carranza as director, the institution opened its doors to the public on February 15, 1891.

Carranza initially operated the museum jointly with a commission led by former Presidents Bartolomé Mitre, Julio Roca, and other members of the National Academy of History of Argentina, which he joined in 1901. He steadily expanded the museum's collections with both outside donations, as well as his own, which included an antiquarian library of over 8,000 volumes and his numismatic collection. He published a historical journal, La Revista Nacional, until 1893, and later established the museum periodical, Revista del Museo. Carranza secured the museum's relocation to the former Lezama mansion (in what became Lezama Park) in 1897.

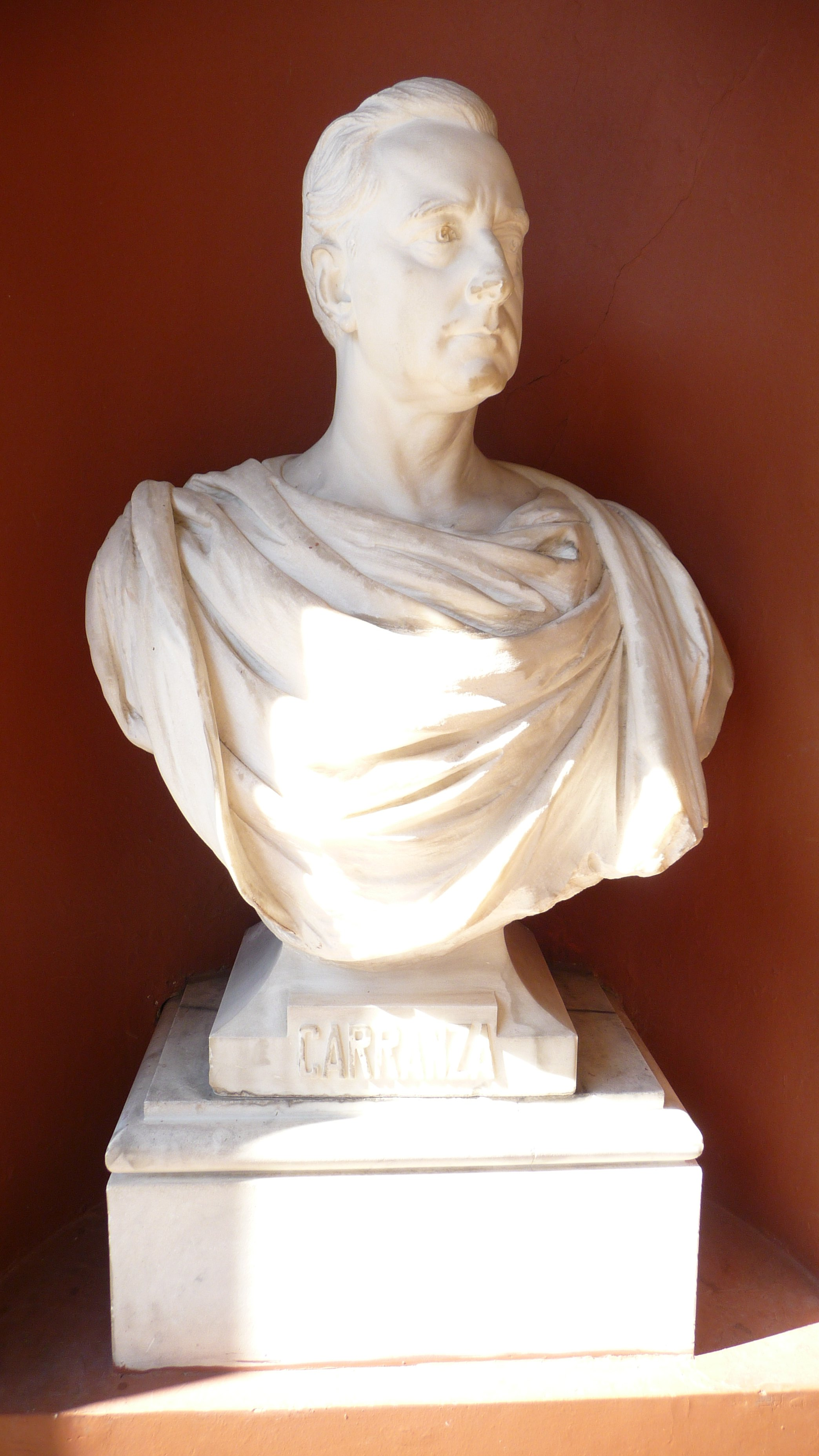
Bust of Adolfo Carranza at the National Historical Museum

A professional historian, he authored numerous works on the fitful history of Argentina, including Hojas históricas (1893), Leyendas Nacionales (1894), and San Martín (y su correspondencia), a 1905 anthology of the Liberator's correspondence. He created a compendium of prized documents held by the General Archive of the Nation, and published two further periodicals, Ilustración Histórica Argentina (1908), and La Ilustración Histórica (1911).

He died suddenly in Buenos Aires in 1914, at age 57. He was interred at La Recoleta Cemetery.
