= Mabel Causarano =

Paraguayan architect and public official

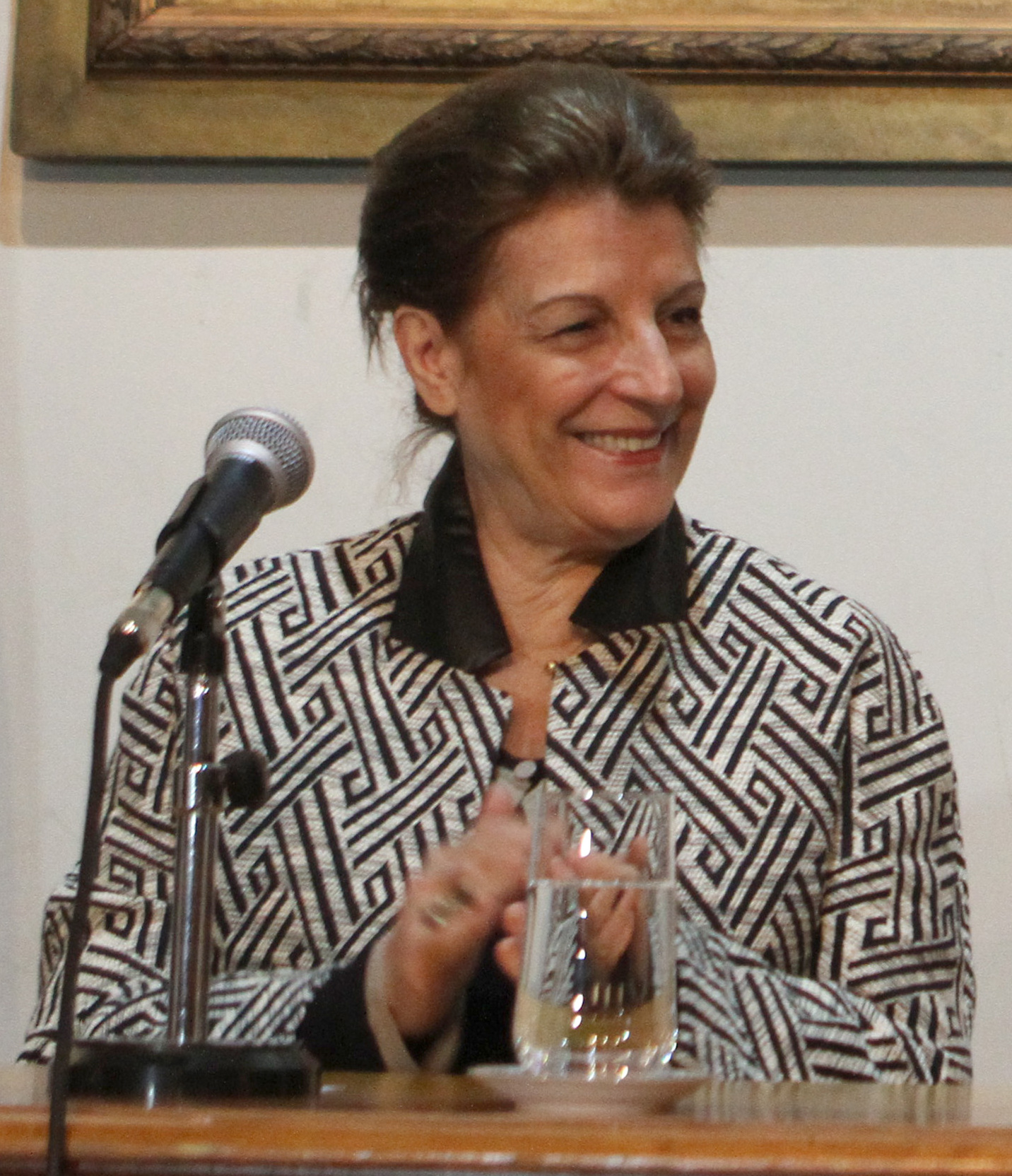
- At the National Historical Museum in Buenos Aires on 28 July 2014

Minister of Culture of Paraguay
- In office 15 August 2013 – 8 September 2016
- President: Horacio Cartes

Personal details
- Born: 1943 (age 82–83) Asunción, Paraguay
- Education: Sapienza University of Rome
- Occupation: Architect, professor

Mabel Causarano (born 1943) is a Paraguayan architect, professor, and public official. She served as National Minister of Culture from 2013 to 2016.

== Career ==
Mabel Causarano earned a PhD in architecture and urban planning from the Sapienza University of Rome. After living in Rome for nine years, she moved to Milan for ten years, before returning to Paraguay in the late 1970s.

She has been a professor and researcher at the Faculty of Science and Technology of the Universidad Católica "Nuestra Señora de la Asunción" (UCA) since 1981. She is a member of the Paraguayan Academy of History and the Scientific Society of Paraguay, a corresponding member of the Real Academia de la Historia of Spain, and is on the Board of Historical Studies of La Recoleta of Buenos Aires, Argentina.

In the 1990s, she directed the REMA Corporation for Sustainable Development in Asunción.

On 15 August 2013, Causarano was appointed National Minister of Culture by President Horacio Cartes. She was dismissed from office on 8 September 2016. The reason given was a lack of progress on civic improvement projects, though some media outlets speculated that political concerns or her move to finance the documentary Paraguay droga y banana had influenced the decision.

== Awards and recognitions ==
In November 2015, Causarano was named a Favored Daughter of the City of Asunción.

In May 2016, she received a career recognition from the UCA.

In August 2016, she was presented with the Raguzani nel Mondo award from the city of Ragusa, Italy.

== Publications ==
- Asunción. Análisis histórico-ambiental de su imagen urbana (1987)
- Aproximación a un proyecto del ambiente, La Chacarita (1989), with Beatriz Chase and Juan José Bosio
- Dinámicas metropolitanas en Asunción, Ciudad del Este y Encarnación (2006), ISBN 9789992576069
- El trazado en damero en el urbanismo colonial hispanoamericano (2008)
- La gobernabilidad de los sistemas metropolitanos. Una propuesta de indicadores (2010)
- Cambios en el carácter público y la centralidad del Centro Histórico de Asunción (2011)
- Encuentro con la ciudad escondida (2012), with Juan José Bosio, Beatriz González de Bosio, and Antonio Spiridonoff, ISBN 9789996767227
