= Torcuato de Alvear =

Argentine politician (1822–1890)

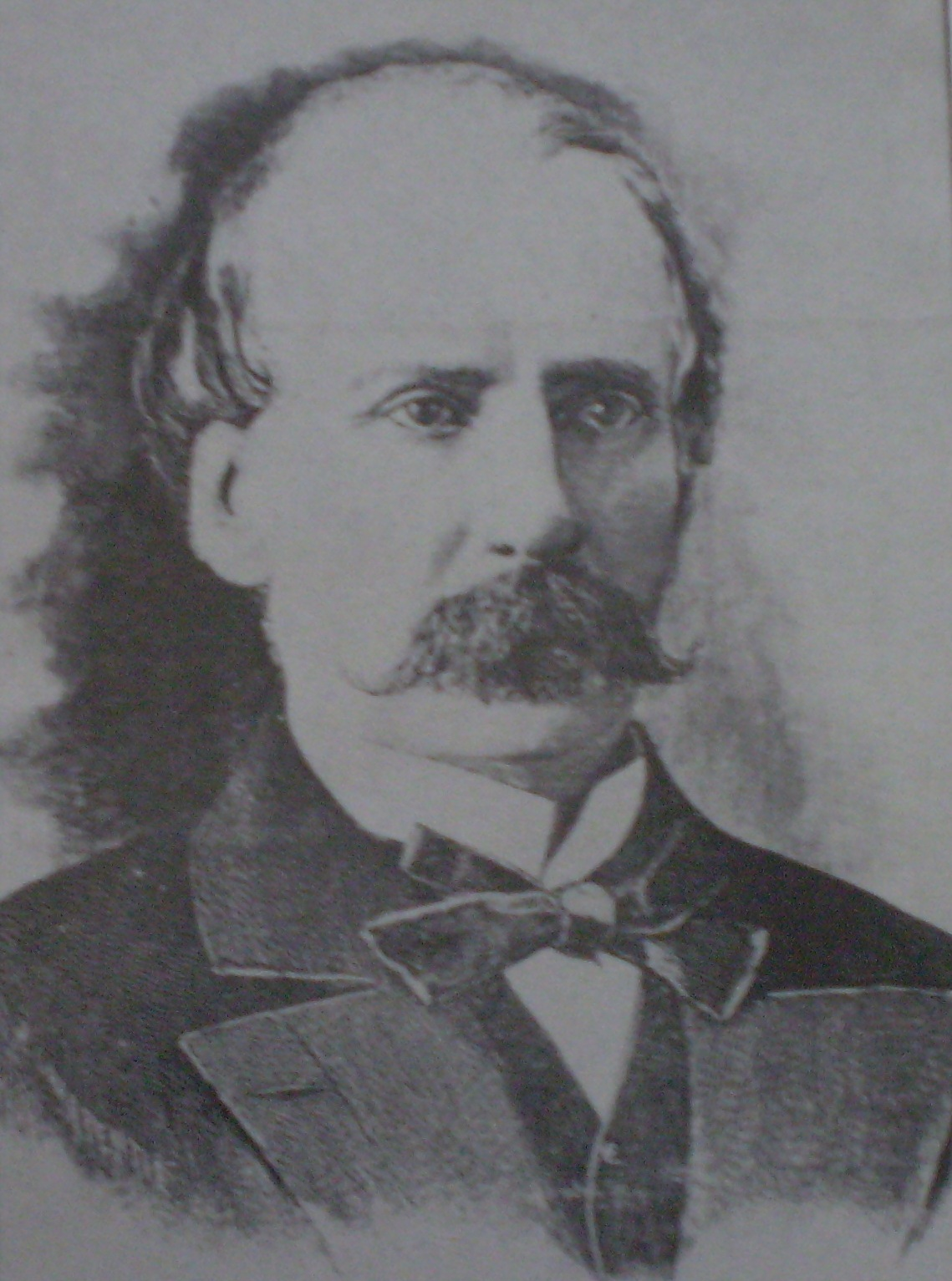
Torcuato de Alvear

Torcuato de Alvear y Saenz de la Quintanilla (12 April 1822 – 8 December 1890) was an Argentine conservative politician. He was the son of soldier and statesman Carlos María de Alvear and father of Marcelo Torcuato de Alvear, president of Argentina from 1922 to 1928. He was also a Freemason.

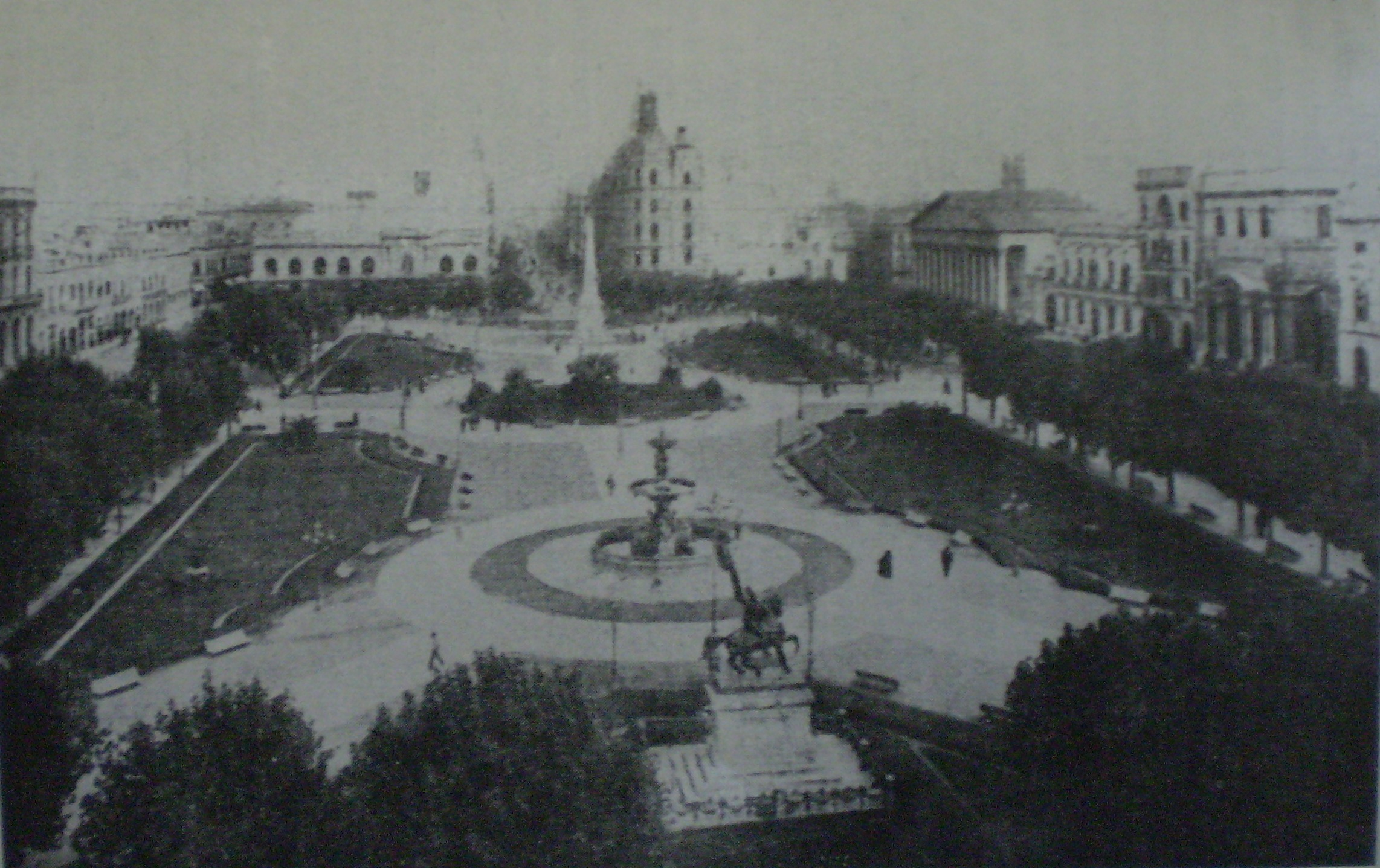
The Plaza de Mayo and, in back, the Avenida de Mayo, shortly after Mayor de Alvear had both developed

In 1880 Buenos Aires was declared the capital city of Argentina, and Torcuato de Alvear served as the first mayor of the city until 1887. During this period he improved the road and street networks, the water and electricity supply, public transport and street lighting and other public services.

Political offices
New post	Mayor of Buenos Aires; 1883–1887	Succeeded by Antonio F. Crespo
