= Antonio F. Crespo =

Argentine politician (1851–1893)

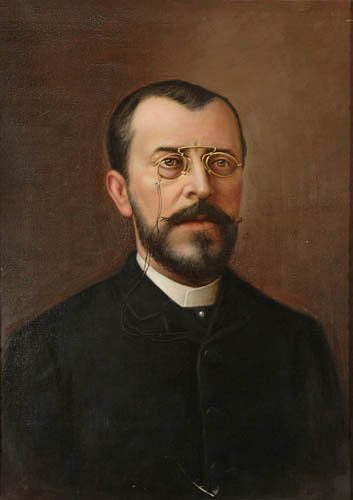

National Senator
- In office 14 May 1889 – 7 June 1893
- Succeeded by: Salvador Maciá
- Constituency: Entre Ríos

Mayor of Buenos Aires
- In office 14 May 1887 – 14 August 1888
- Preceded by: Torcuato de Alvear
- Succeeded by: Guillermo Cranwell

National Deputy
- In office 1884 – 14 May 1887
- Constituency: Entre Ríos

Personal details
- Born: 3 December 1851 Paraná, Argentine Confederation
- Died: 7 July 1893 (aged 41) Buenos Aires, Argentina
- Party: National Autonomist Party
- Education: University of Buenos Aires

Antonio Francisco Crespo (3 December 1851 – 7 July 1893) was an Argentine physician and politician. He served as the second intendente (mayor) of the City of Buenos Aires from 1887 to 1888, and served terms in both houses of the National Congress of Argentina representing his native Entre Ríos.

== Early and personal life ==
Crespo was born on 3 December 1851 in Paraná, Entre Ríos. He came from a distinguished political family as the great-grandson of Francisco Candioti and son of Manuel Crespo, while also being cousin to Prócoro Crespo, who served as governor of Entre Ríos. His academic path led him to complete medical studies at the University of Buenos Aires, graduating in 1875. Seeking further specialization, he pursued advanced training in Europe before returning to Argentina.

Upon his return from Europe, despite being an ophthalmology specialist, he was appointed Professor of Hygiene at the Buenos Aires Faculty of Medical Sciences. His professional standing was further recognized when he assumed the presidency of the Círculo Médico Argentino in 1879.

== Career ==
In 1884 he was elected to the National Chamber of Deputies representing Entre Ríos. He served until May 1887, when President Miguel Juárez Celman appointed him as Mayor of Buenos Aires, then a newly federalized city. Crespo was only the Federal Capital's second mayor, succeeding Torcuato de Alvear.

=== Mayor of Buenos Aires ===
As mayor he oversaw a significant administrative milestone when the partidos of Flores and Belgrano were formally incorporated into the Federal Capital, dramatically expanding its territorial jurisdiction. This consolidation marked a pivotal moment in Buenos Aires' urban development as it transitioned toward becoming a modern metropolis.

His administration engaged in a dispute with the Supreme Court, which ruled on the (at the time) controversial Avenida de Mayo project. The court mandated that expropriations would only apply to land directly required for the avenue's construction, rather than entire city blocks as originally planned. This judicial decision significantly impacted municipal finances, as the city government had intended to fund the project through subsequent sales of the fully expropriated properties. The ruling particularly benefited private landowners whose properties would front the new avenue, as their holdings appreciated in value.

Among his most enduring contributions was the 1887 implementation of a standardized property numbering system, assigning one hundred numbers per city block (with odd numbers on one side and even on the other), a system that remains in use today. His administration also sold the original Teatro Colón to the Banco de la Nación Argentina, proposed construction of a new lyric theater at the current Congressional Palace site, surrounded by a grand plaza with four diagonal avenues, and prioritized wider avenues and new green spaces as public health measures to combat frequent epidemics.

=== Later career ===
Due to health complications, he resigned as mayor in 1888 and was replaced, in interim fashion, by Guillermo Cranwell. The following year he was elected as a National Senator for Entre Ríos, marking his return to politics at the federal level. His contributions to Buenos Aires were later commemorated through the naming of Villa Crespo, a neighborhood that honors his legacy.

He died in Buenos Aires on 7 July 1893, a month after resigning from his seat in the Senate.

Political offices
Preceded by Torcuato de Alvear	Mayor of Buenos Aires; 1887–1888	Succeeded by Guillermo Cranwell
