= Guillermo Cranwell =

Guillermo A. Cranwell
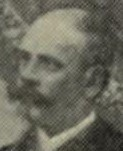

Mayor of Buenos Aires
- In office 1888–1889
- Preceded by: Antonio F. Crespo
- Succeeded by: Francisco Seeber

Personal details
- Born: November 16, 1841 Buenos Aires, Argentina
- Died: July 12, 1909 (aged 67) Buenos Aires, Argentina
- Resting place: La Recoleta Cemetery
- Party: National Autonomist Party
- Spouse: Petrona Costa y Cáneva
- Occupation: Politician
- Profession: Pharmacist
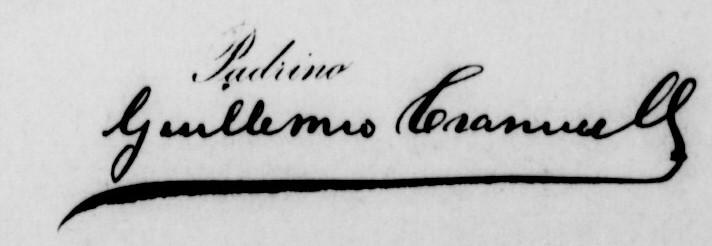
- Signature

Guillermo Cranwell (1841–1909) was an Argentine apothecary and politician, who served as intendant and president of the Deliberative Council of Buenos Aires.

== Biography ==
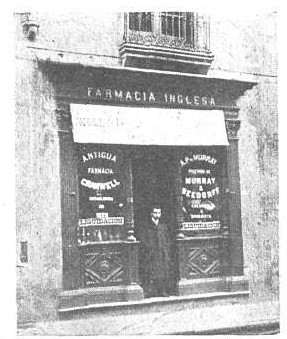
facade of "Farmacia Inglesa", Calle de la Victoria, Monserrat, Buenos Aires

Cranwell was born in Buenos Aires, the son of Edmund Cranwell and Dolores Arenillas, belonging to a distinguished family. His father, an Irish Catholic born in County Tipperary, and who arrived at the city of Buenos Aires in 1825, was the owner of the "Farmacia Inglesa" (English Pharmacy), one of the first drugstores in the city, located on Reconquista Street, San Nicolás neighborhood.

Guillermo occupied the position of interim mayor of Buenos Aires between August 1888 and May 1889. He also served as inspector of apothecaries of the South Cathedral neighborhood, and in the Deliberative Council of the city, being its president in 1880.

Guillermo Cranwell was married on March 11, 1871, in the Church of San Miguel Arcángel to Petrona Costa, daughter of Juan Miguel Costa and María Josefa González.
