= National Historical Museum (Argentina) =

Museum in Buenos Aires, Argentina

Coordinates: 34°37′37″S 58°22′14″W

National Historical Museum of Argentina
- Museo Histórico Nacional de Argentina
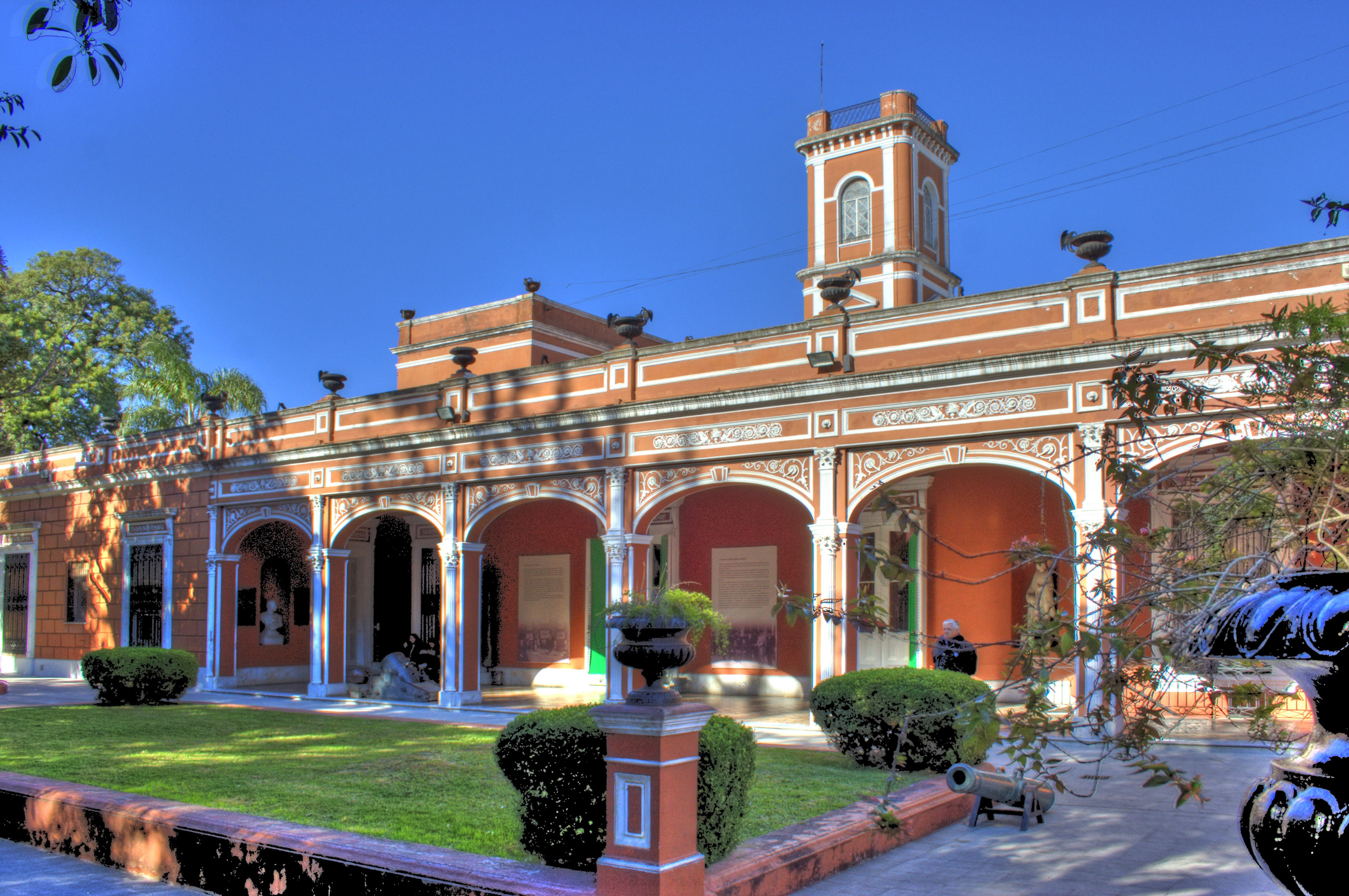
- Palacio Lezama, seat of the museum
- Established: May 1889; 137 years ago
- Location: Buenos Aires, Argentina
- Type: Historical
- Collection size: 50,000
- Owner: Government of Argentina
- Parking: museohistoriconacional.gob.ar

National Historic Monument of Argentina

The National Historical Museum (Spanish: Museo Histórico Nacional) is a museum located in Buenos Aires, Argentina, and is a museum dedicated to the history of Argentina, exhibiting objects relating to the May Revolution and the Argentine War of Independence.

The museum is under the guidance of the Secretariat of Culture.

== History ==
The institution was established as the Museo Histórico de la Capital (Historical Museum of the Capital) by Mayor Francisco Seeber on May 24, 1889.

The museum resulted from a proposal by historian Adolfo Carranza, who was designated director of the museum upon its inauguration on February 15, 1891. The museum was initially located on government property located at 3951 Santa Fe Avenue (now occupied by the Buenos Aires Botanical Garden). It was relocated to its present location in the San Telmo ward after the land's purchase by the Municipality of Buenos Aires in 1897. The land later occupied by the Botanical Garden was thus transferred to the municipal government, and the museum to the national government.

The mansion was originally built for an English merchant, Daniel Mackinlay. In 1845, it was sold by his widow to the American businessman Charles Ridgley Horne in 1846, who enlarged the house and the gardens. Allied to the paramount Governor of Buenos Aires, Juan Manuel de Rosas, Ridgley Horne was forced into exile after the strongman's 1852 overthrow, and the land was sold to José Gregorio Lezama. Following his 1894 death, his widow, Ángela Álzaga de Lezama sold the property to the city, which converted the mansion into the museum, and most of the surrounding land into Lezama Park.

== Exhibits ==
The museum houses over 50,000 items. Portions of the collection were gathered from donations of relatives of important figures in the May Revolution and the wars of independence. Other objects were part of the collection of the Public Museum (Museo Público) created in 1822 by Bernardino Rivadavia.

Its displays include regalia, belongings, furnishings and documents belonging to José de San Martín, María de los Remedios de Escalada, Manuel Belgrano, William Carr Beresford, Juan Manuel de Rosas, Bartolomé Mitre, Juan and Eva Perón, and other Argentine, as well as foreign, statesmen, lawmakers, and military figures who played key roles in the nation's history up to 1950.

Its collection of history paintings includes works by Esteban Echeverría, Cándido López, and Prilidiano Pueyrredón, among others.

== Gallery Building ==
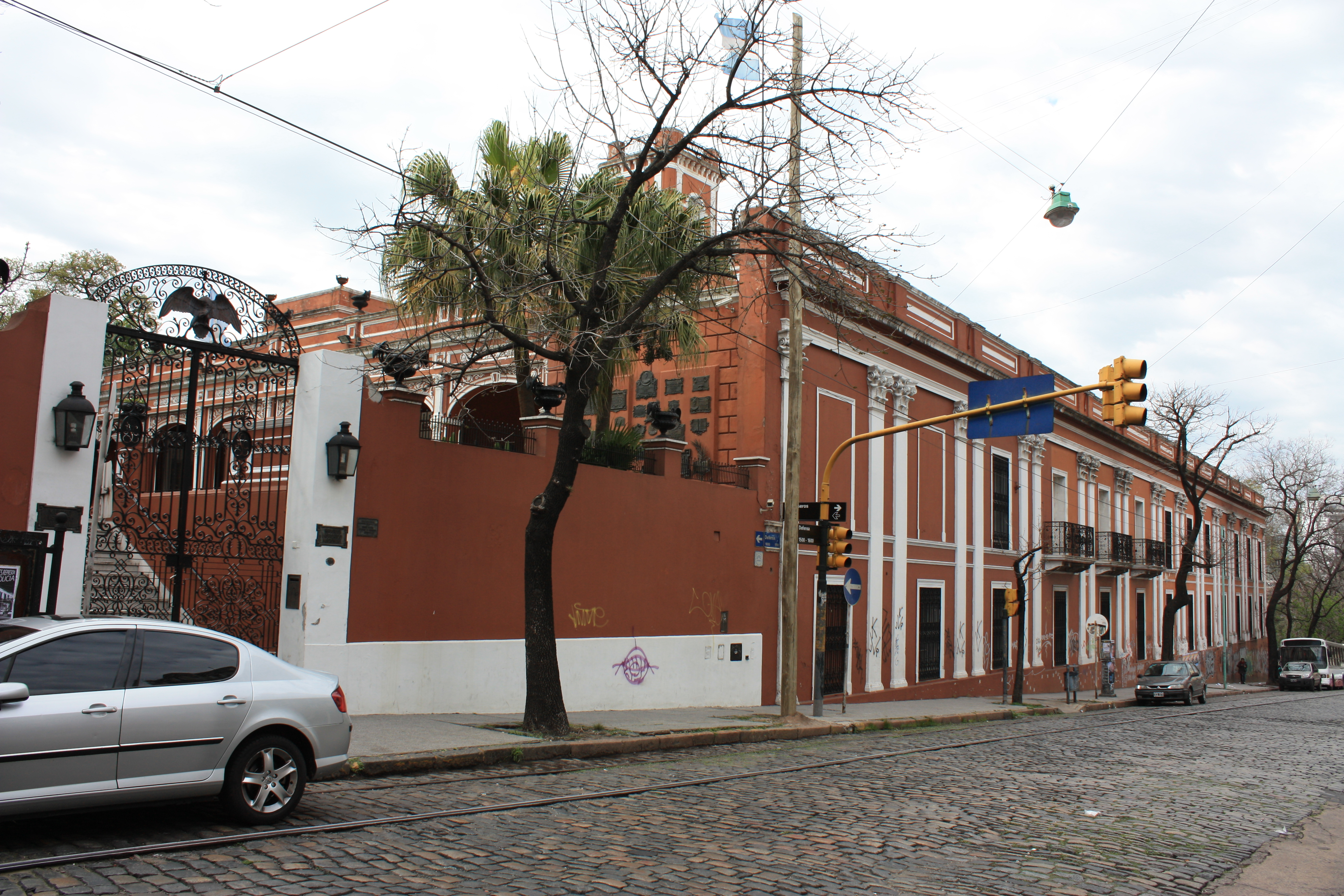

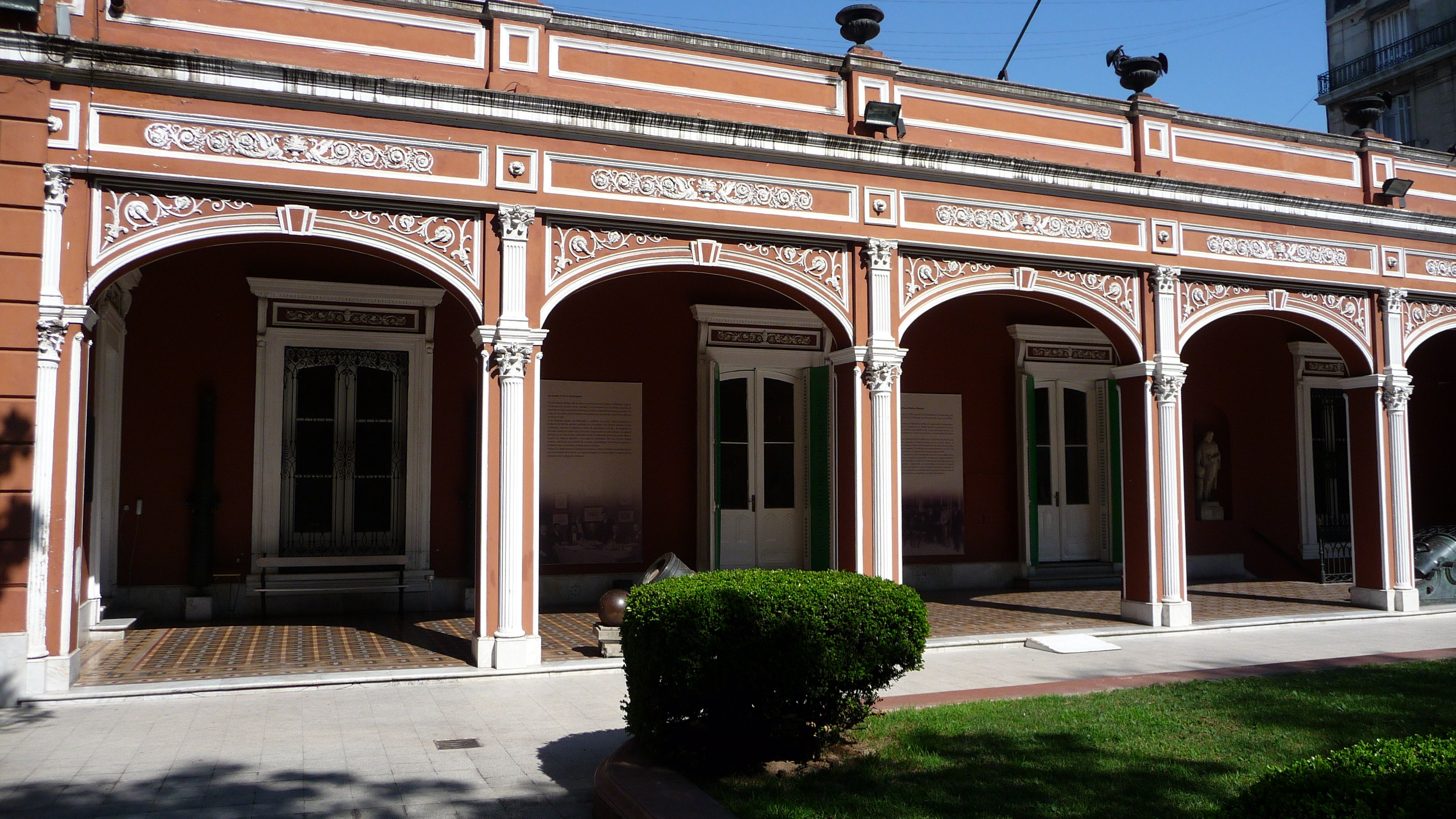

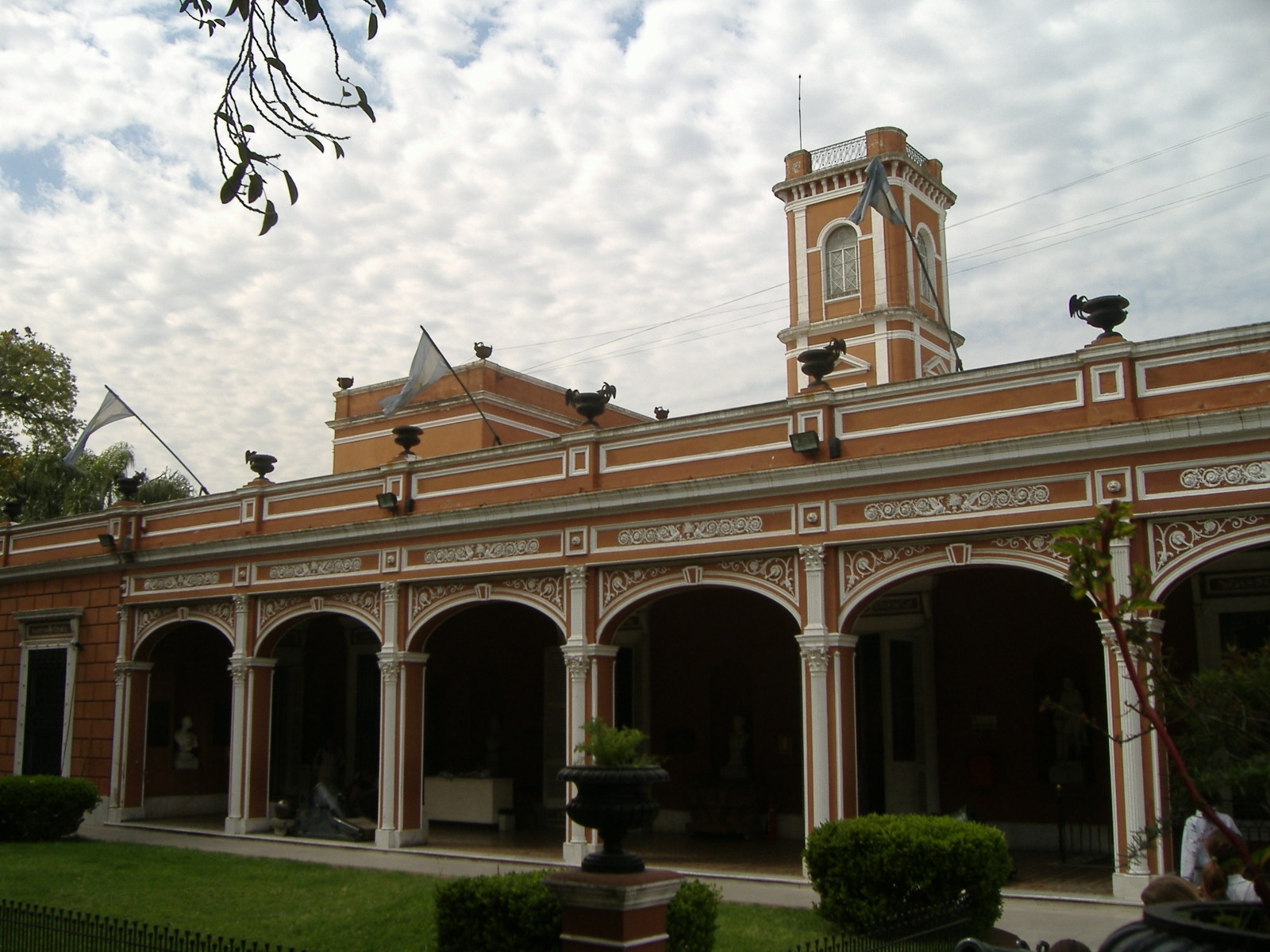

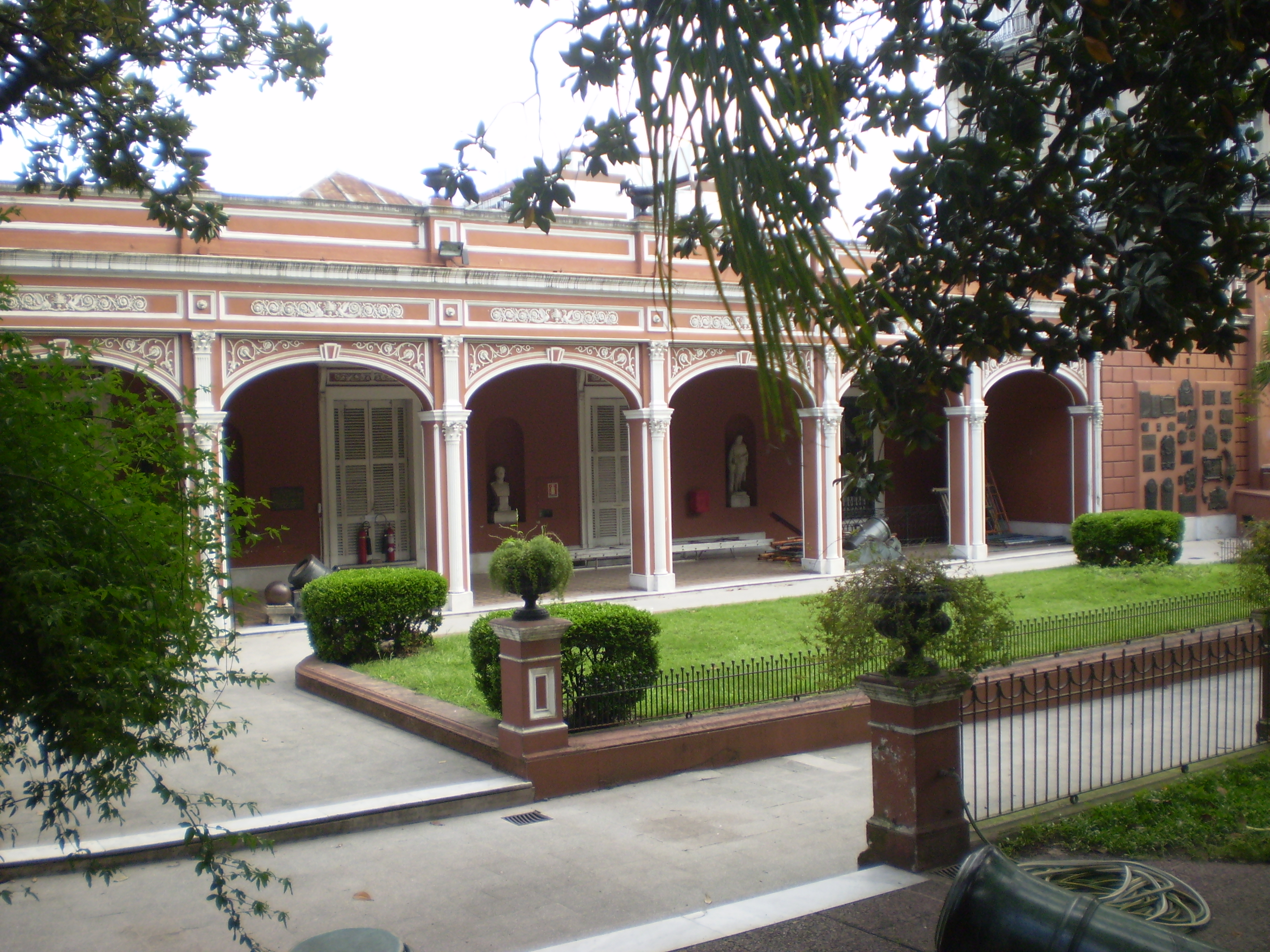

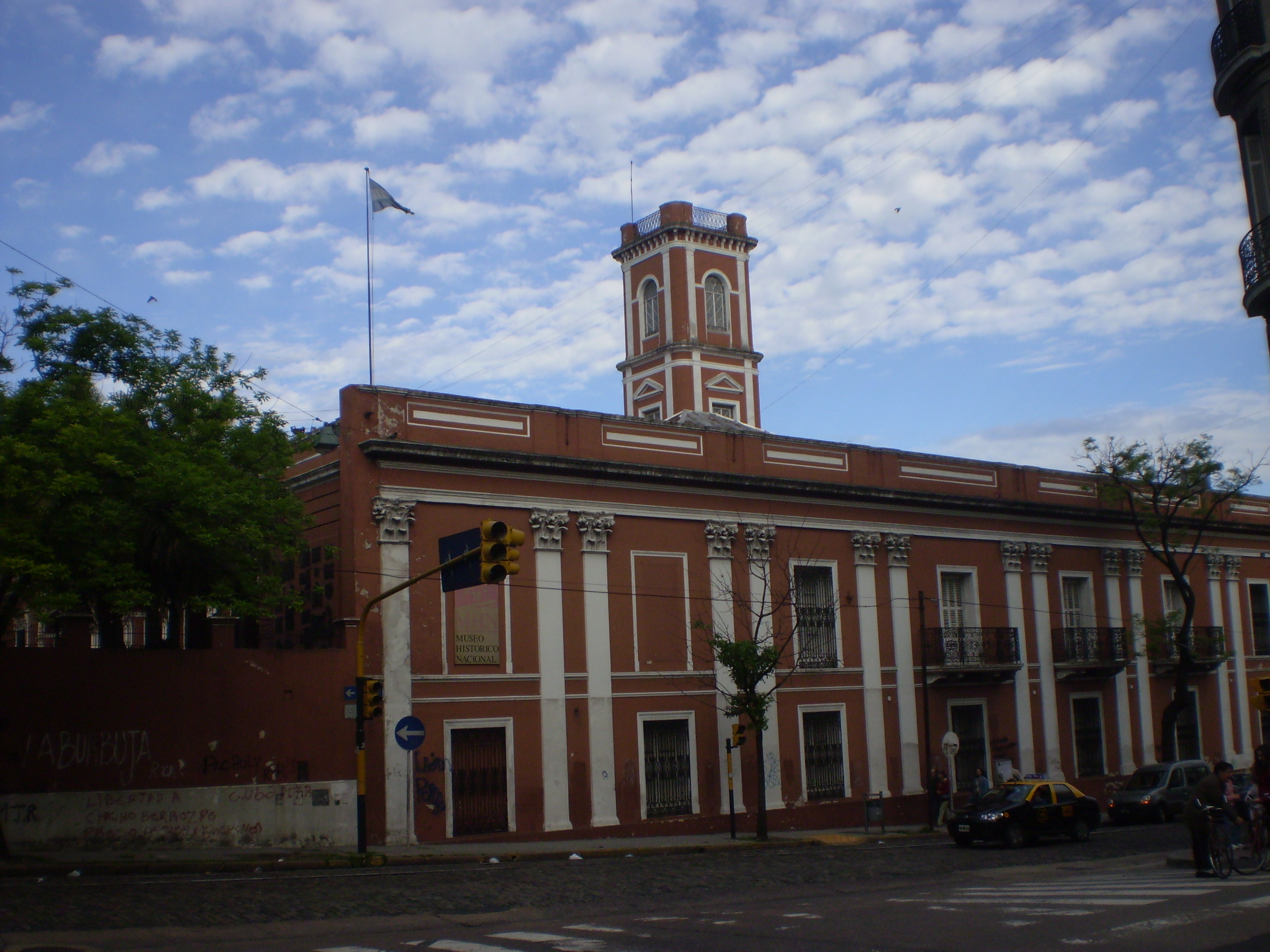

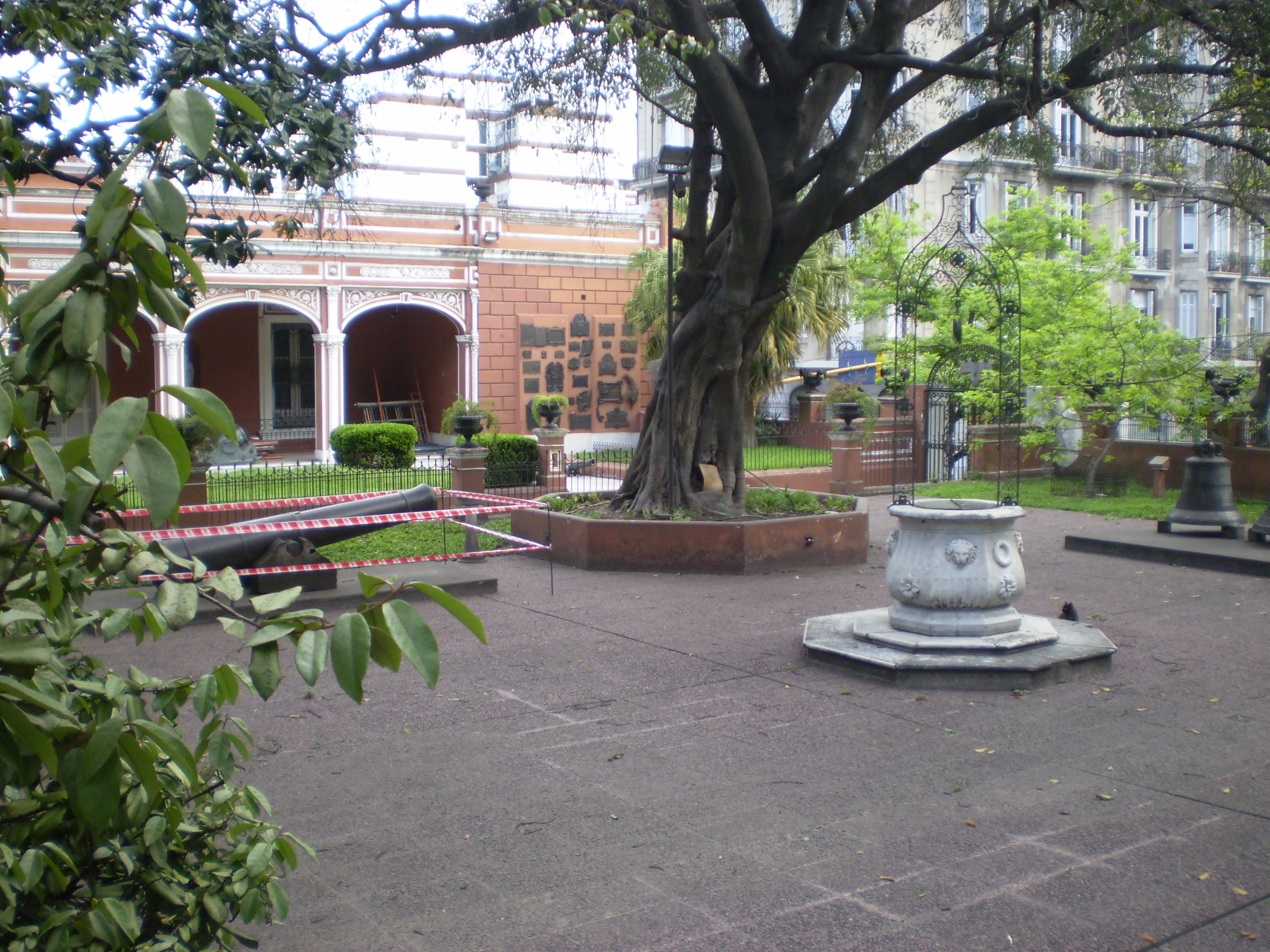

== Gallery Collection ==
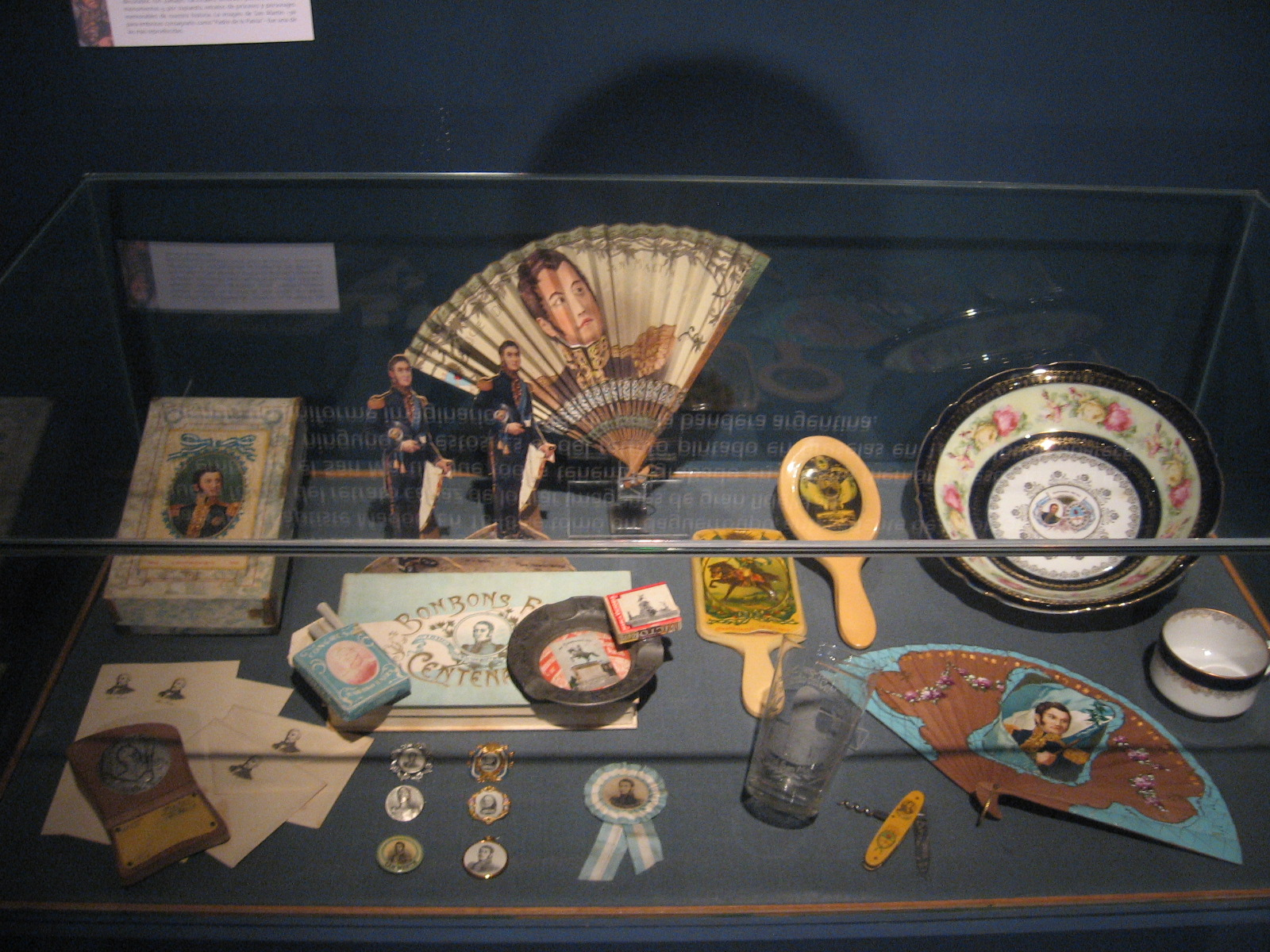

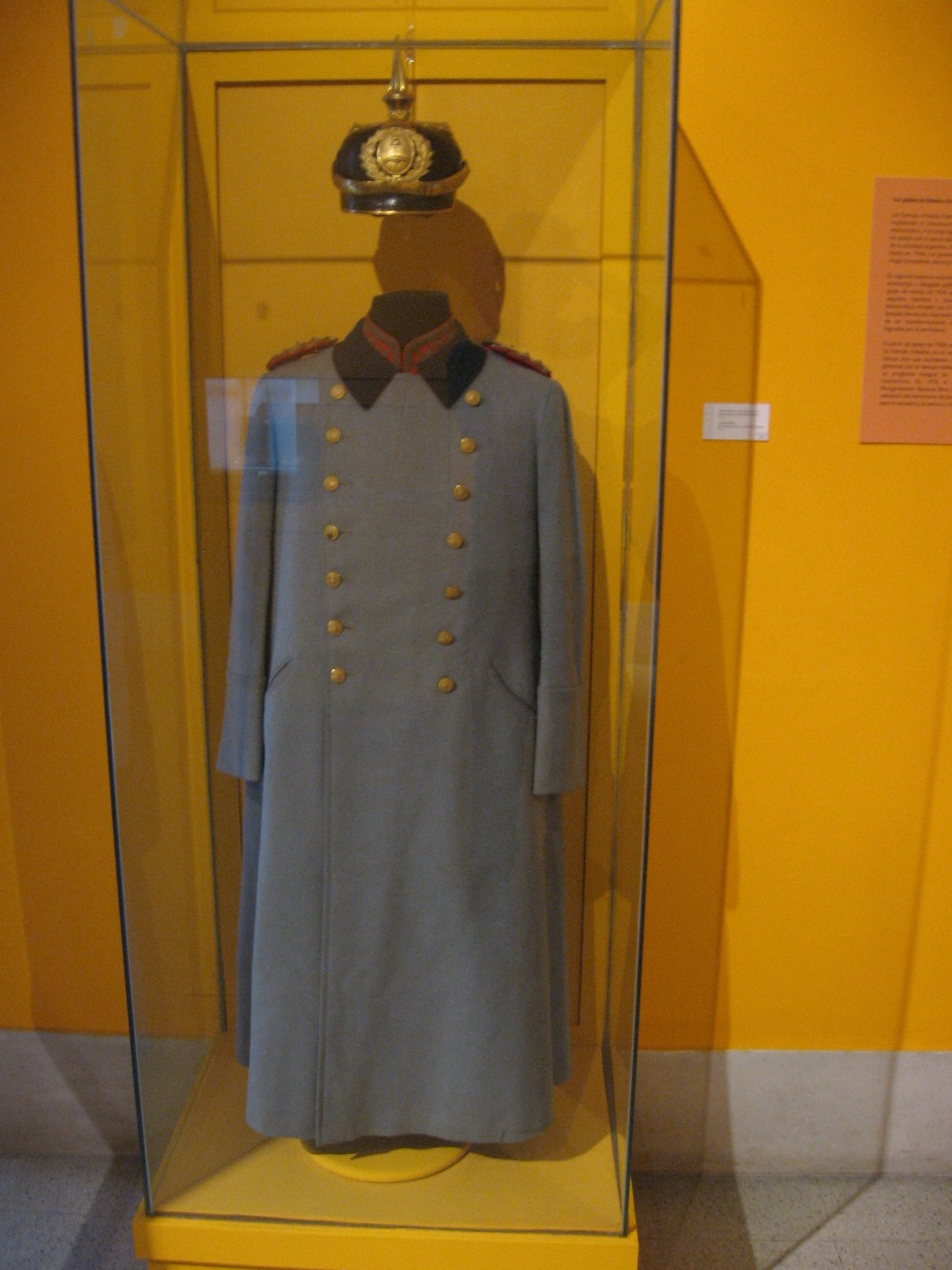

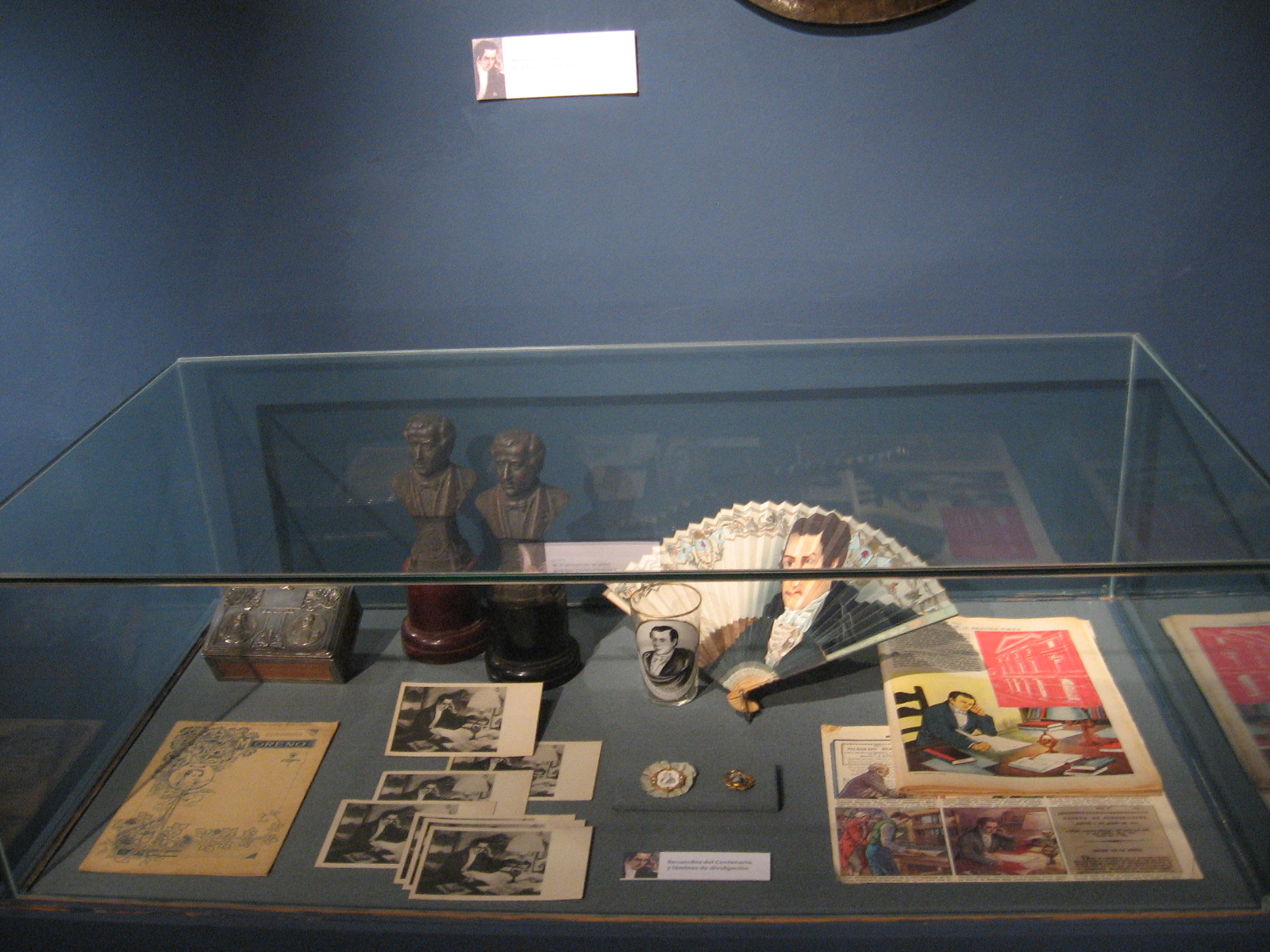

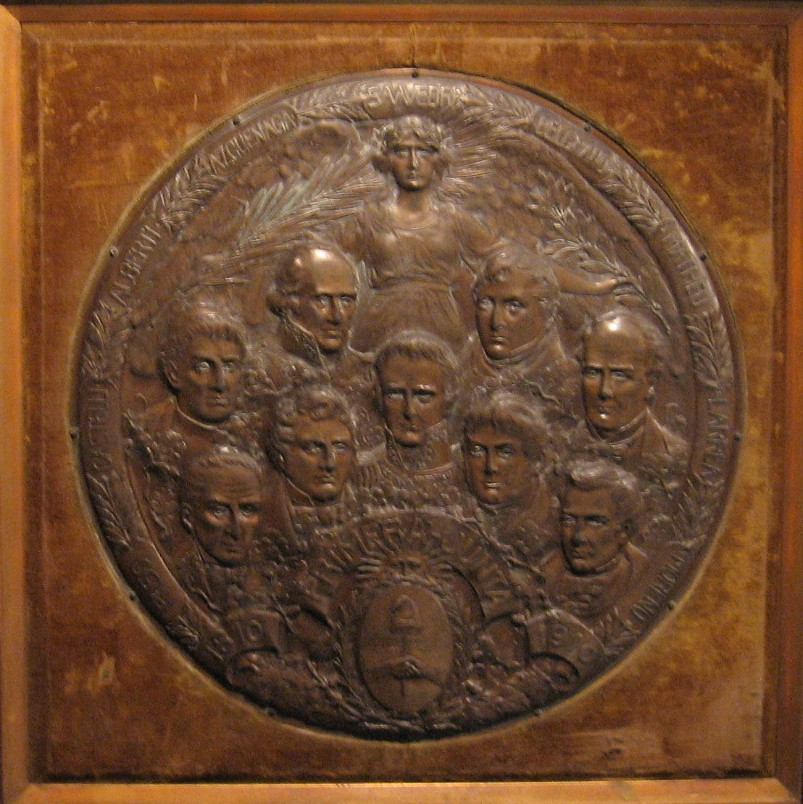

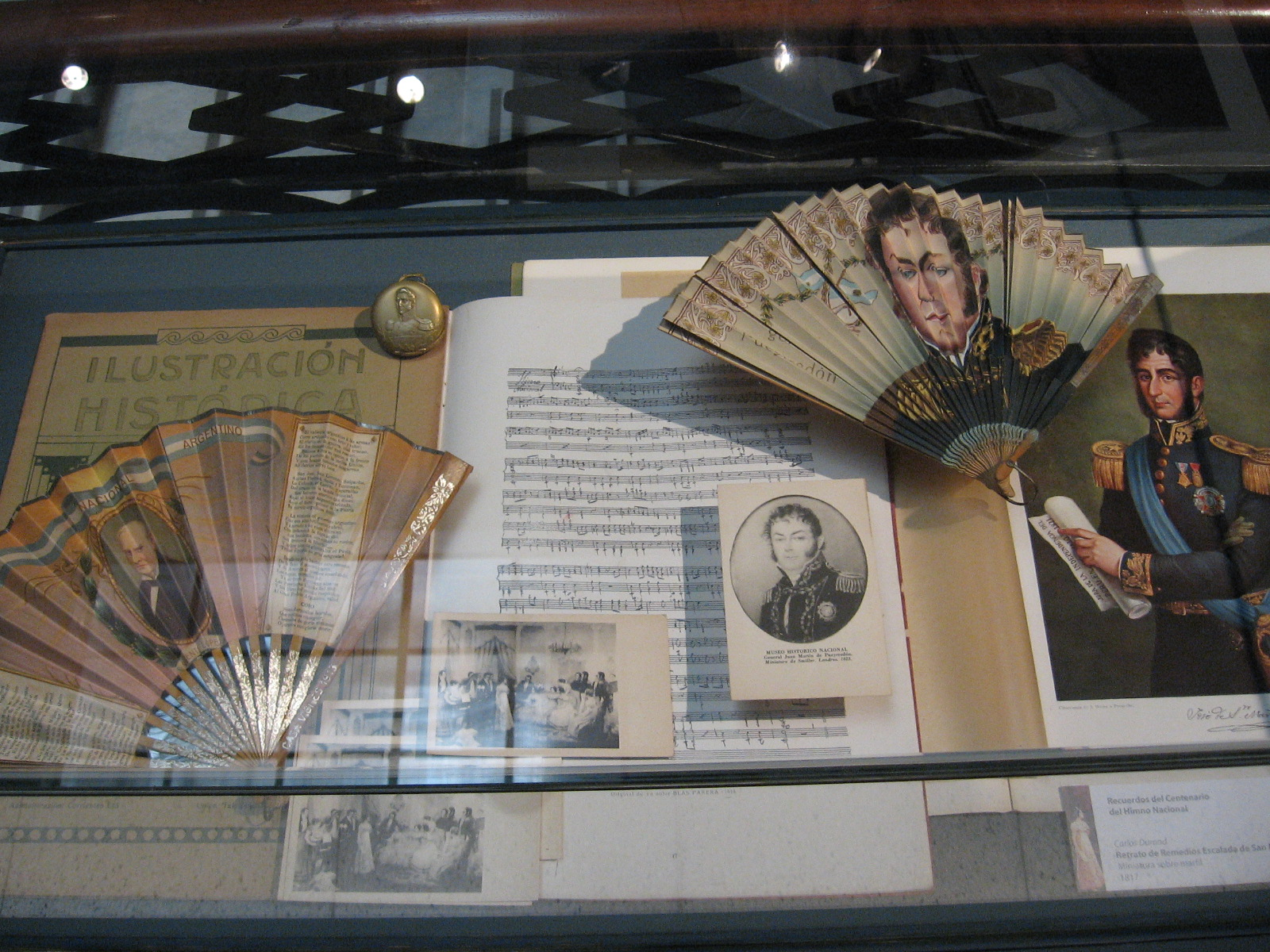

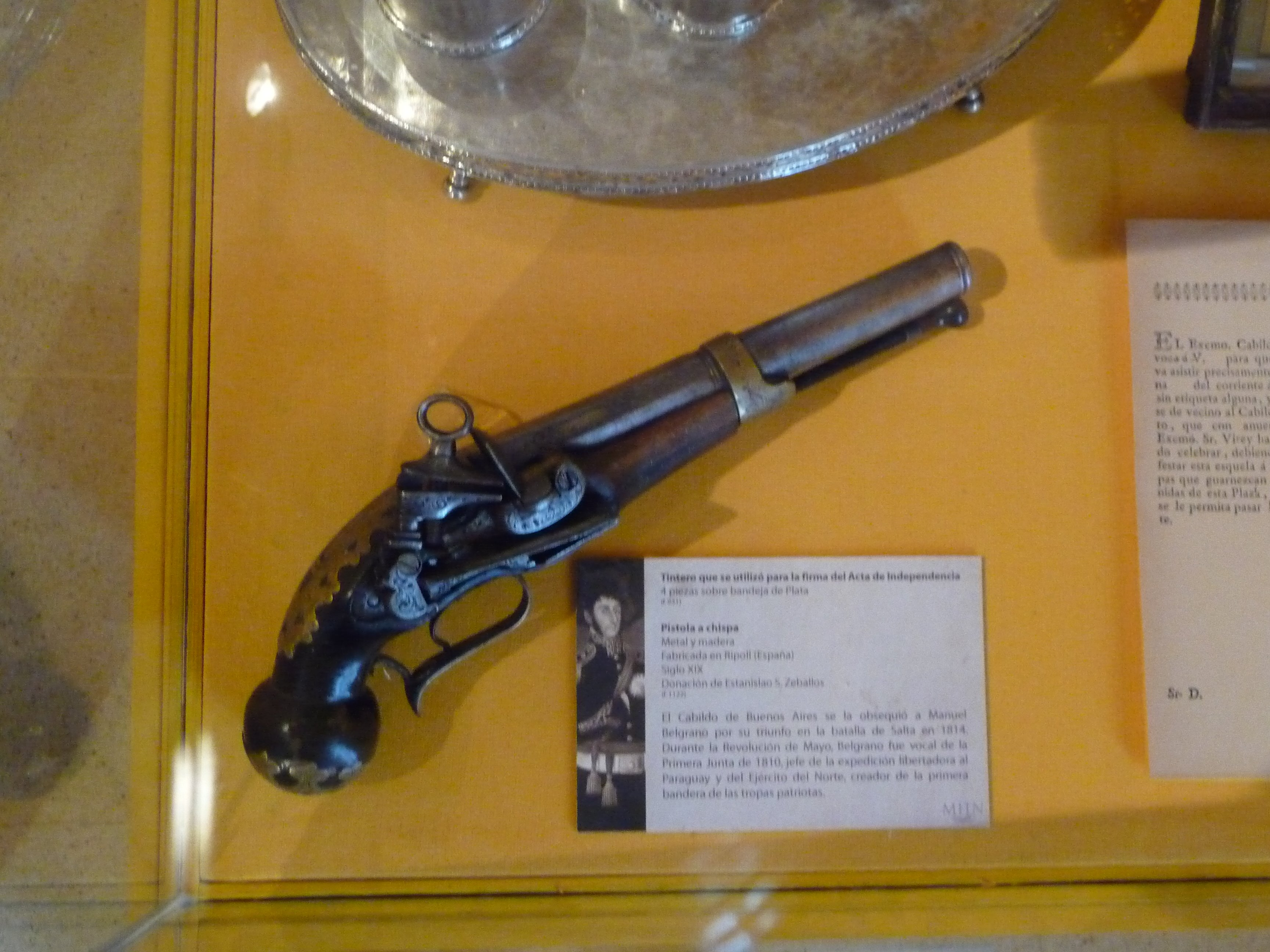

== Gallery of Paintings ==
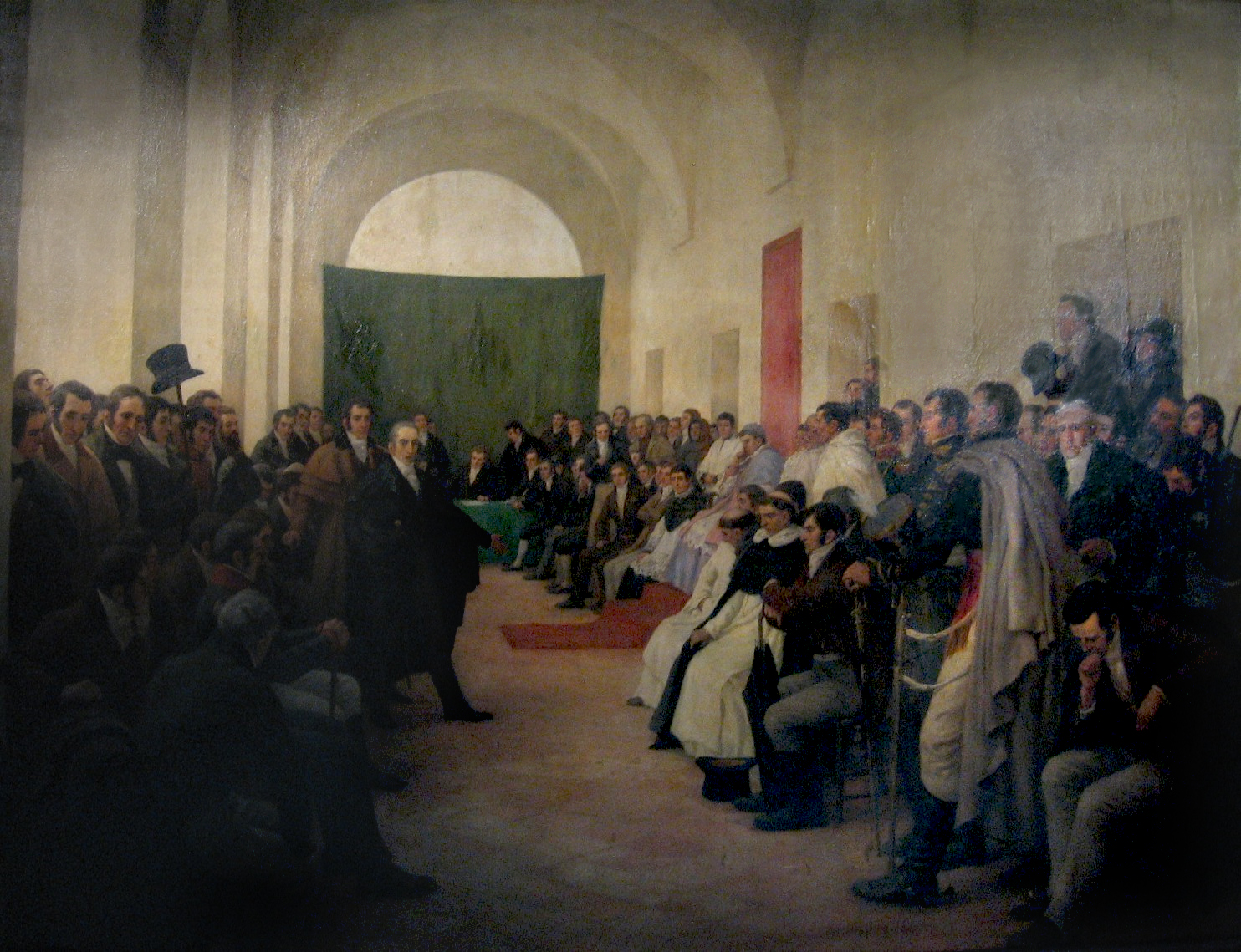

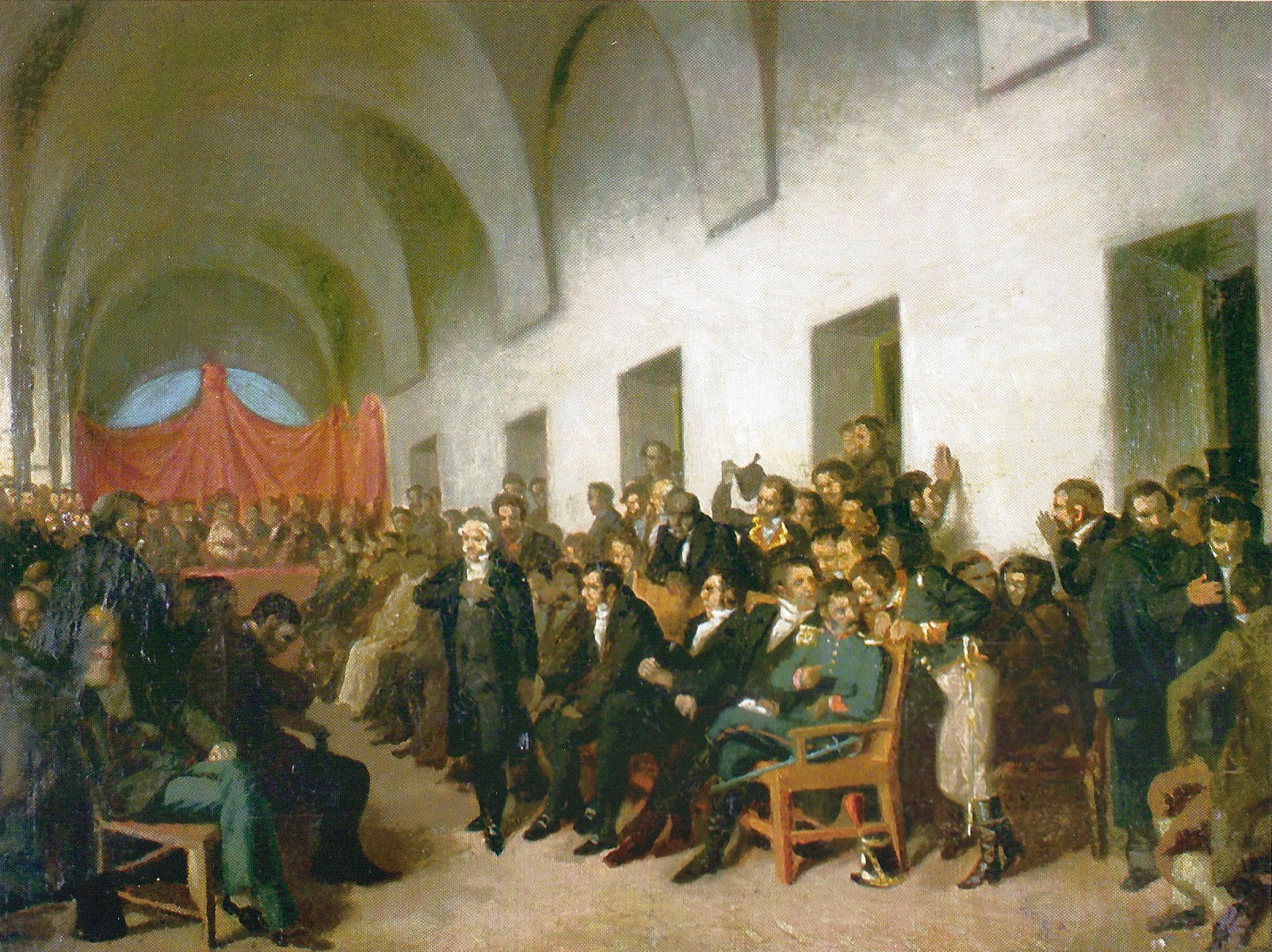

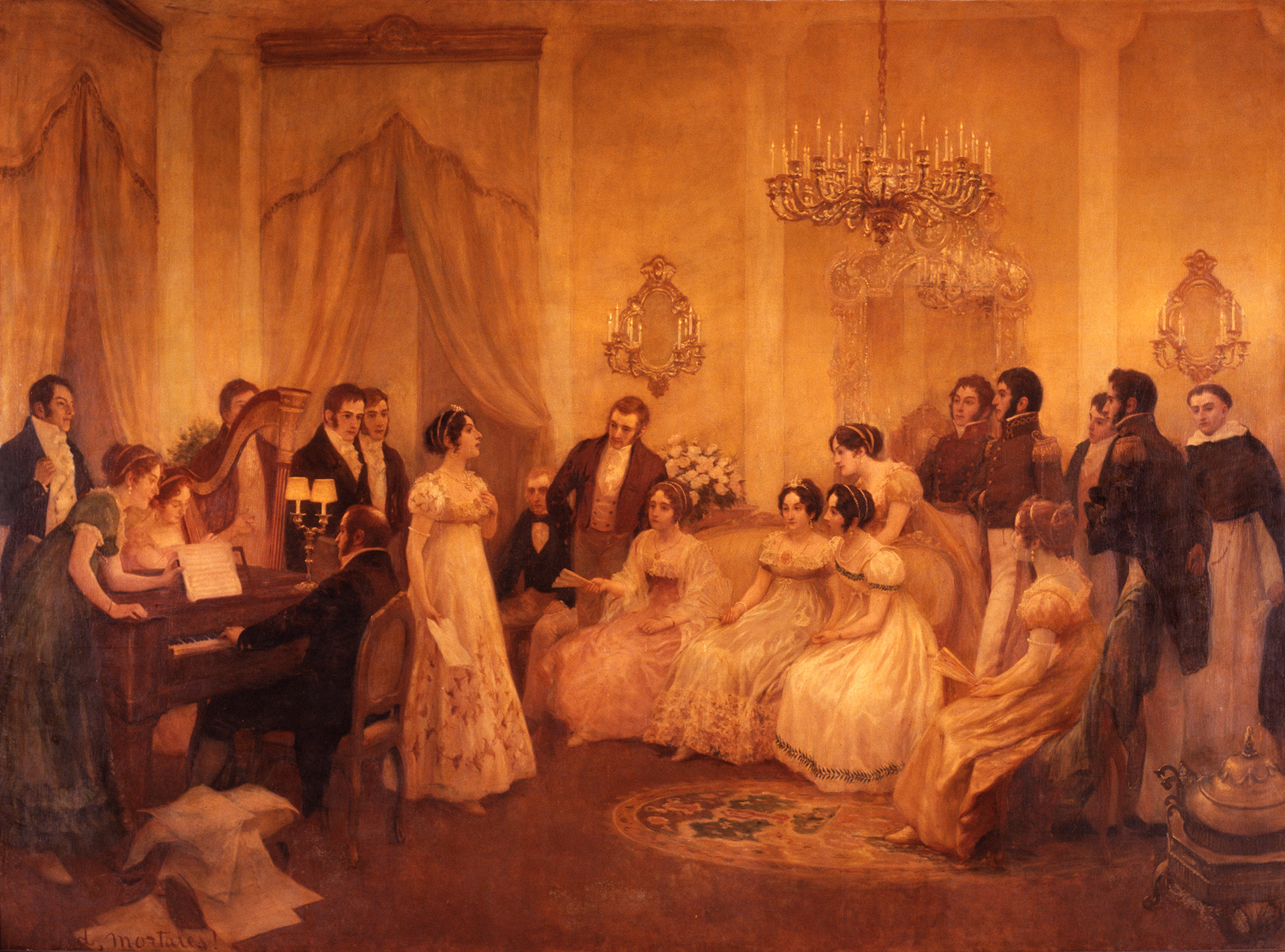

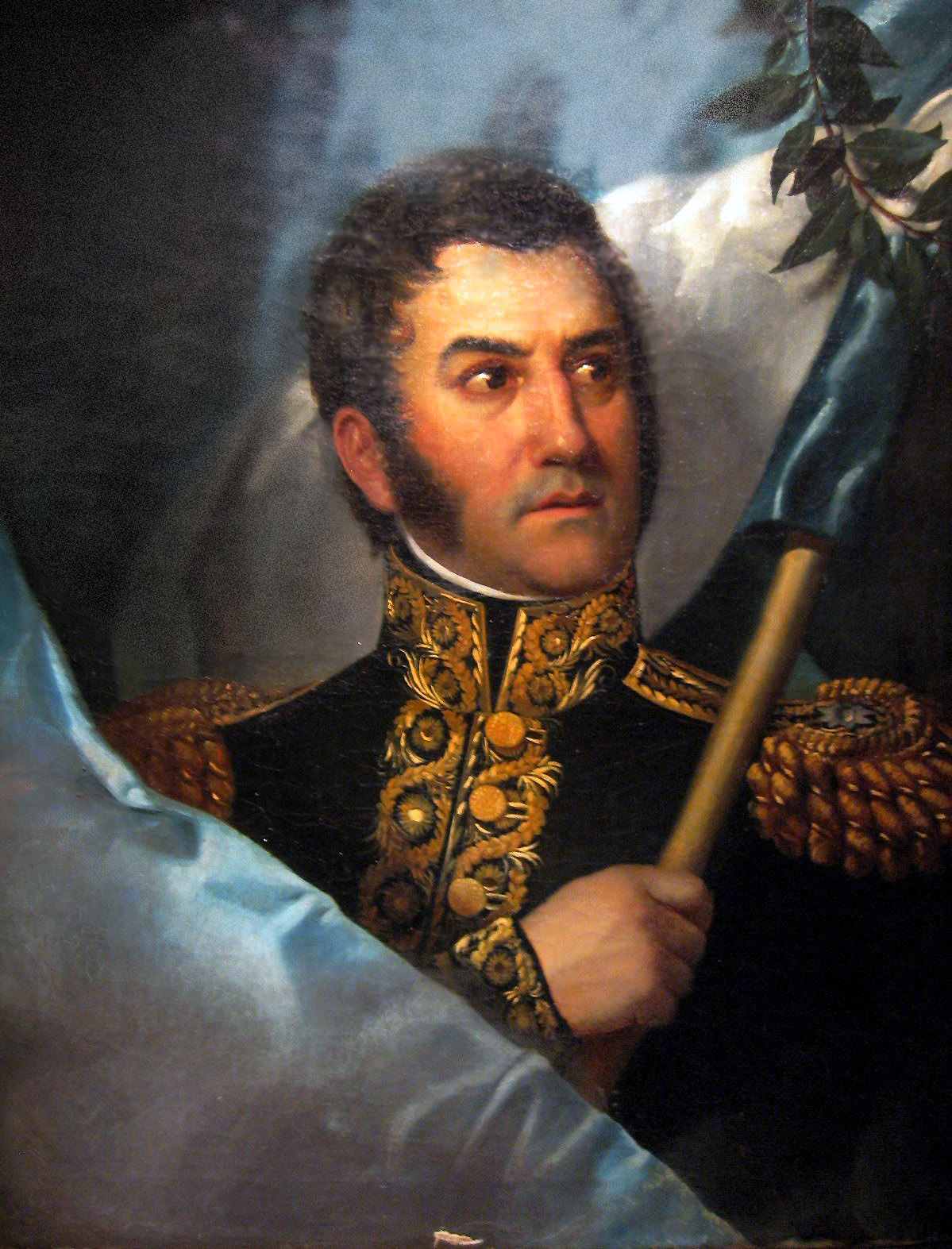

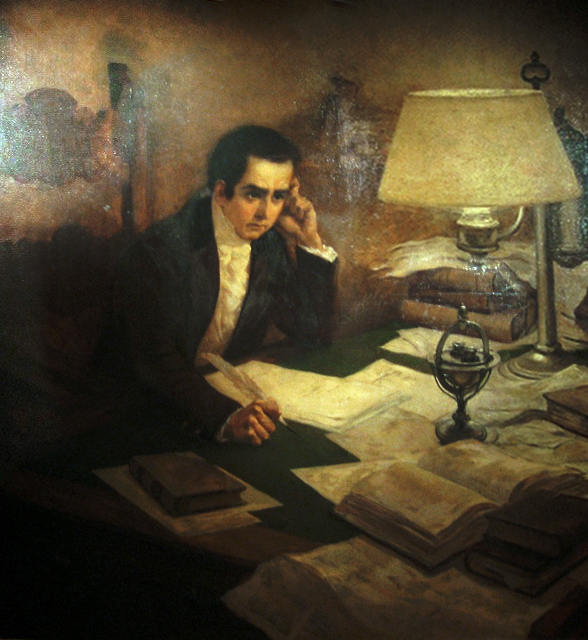

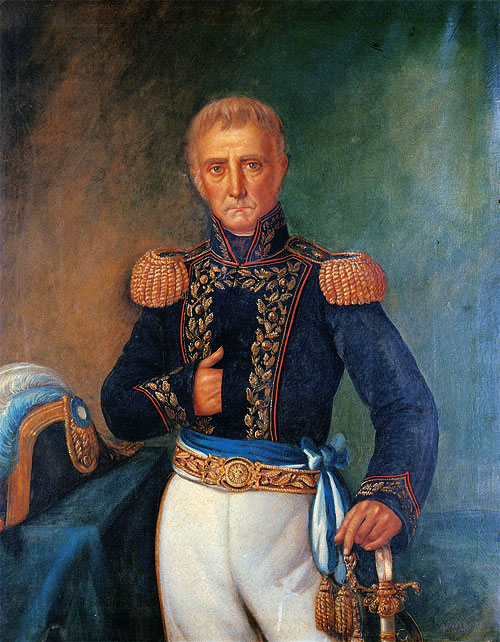
