= Lezama Park =

Urban park in Buenos Aires

Coordinates: 34°37′36″S 58°22′10″W

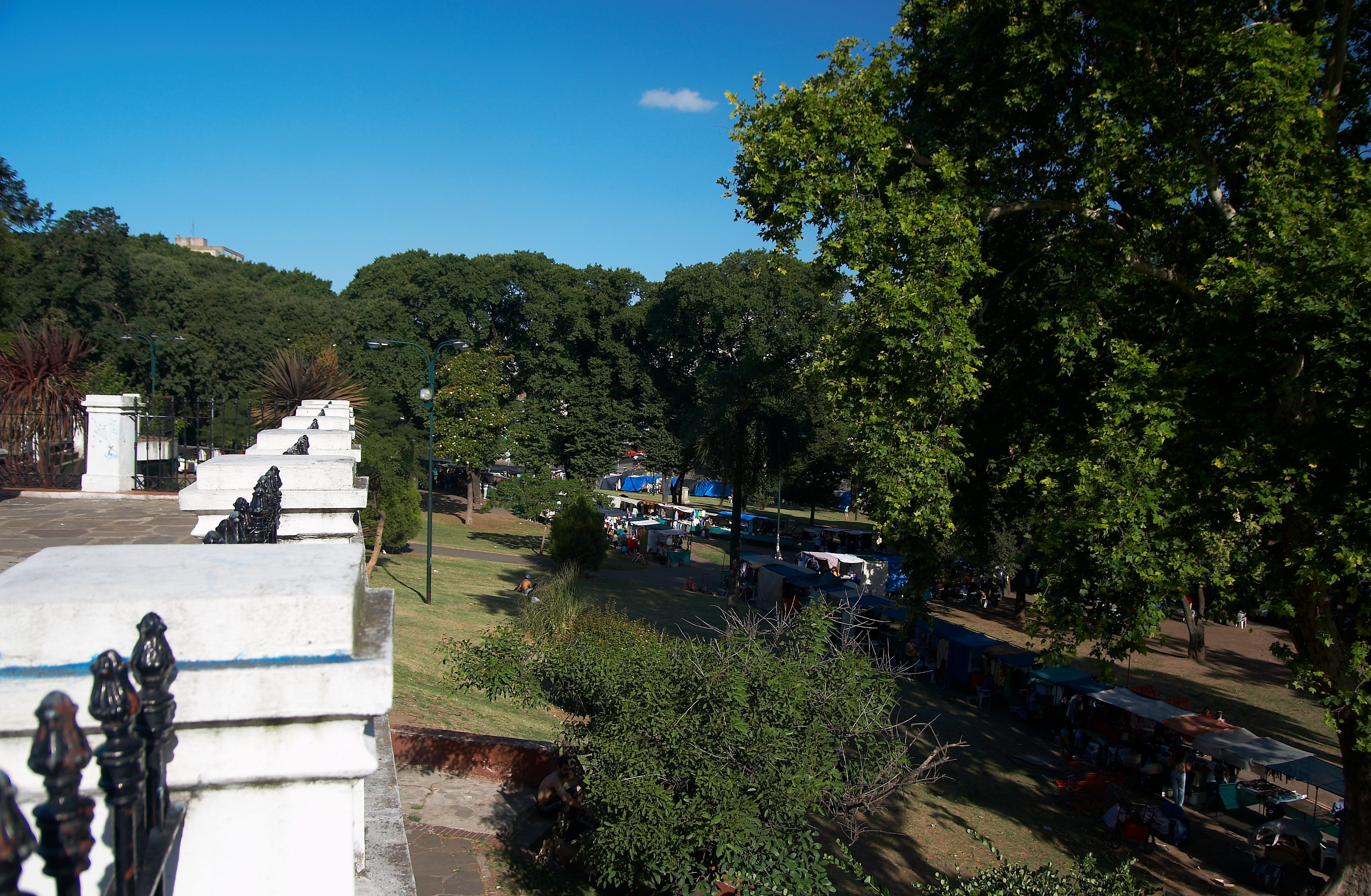
The barranca along the park's eastern half

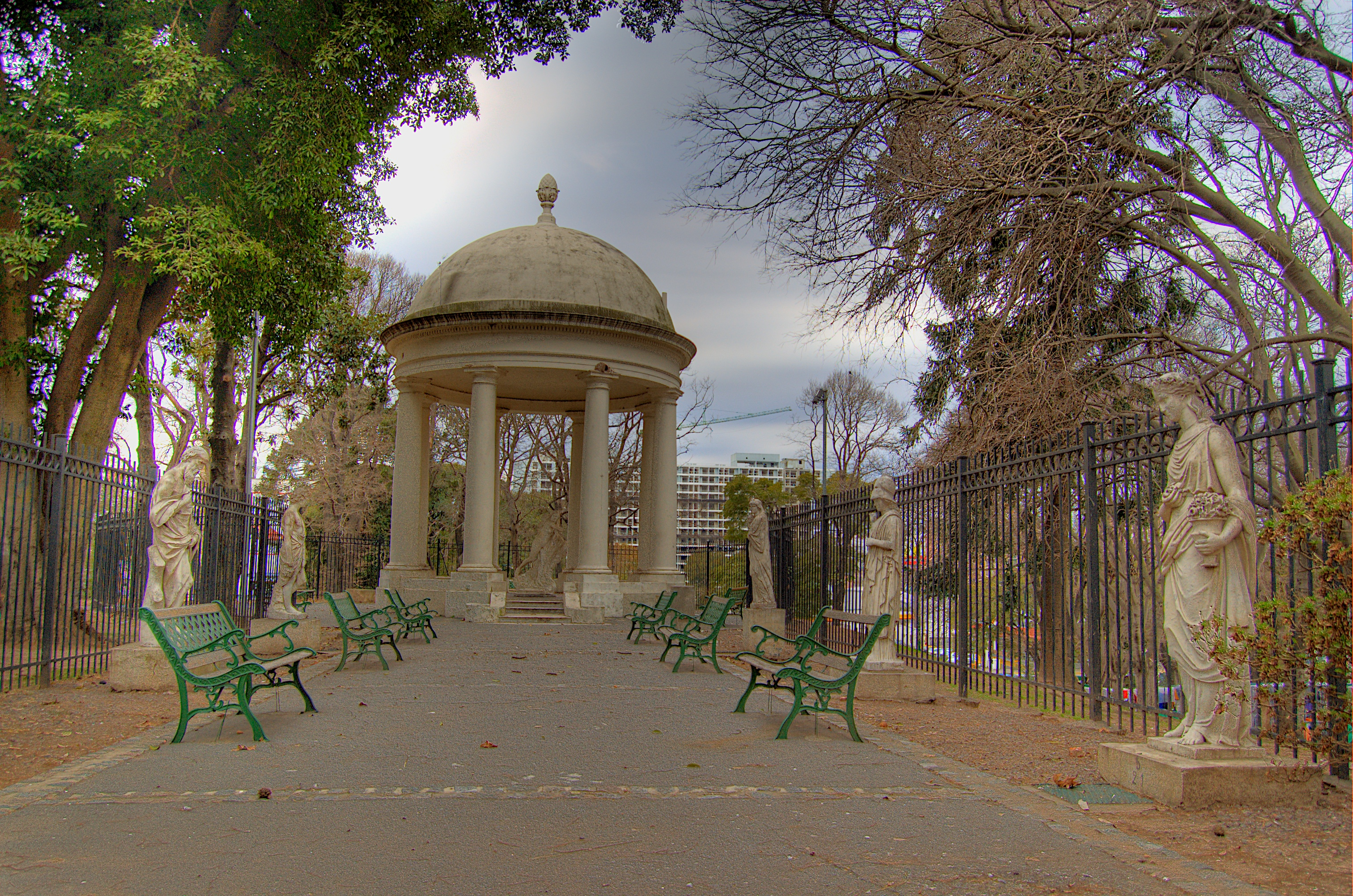
Gazebo and sculpture garden

Lezama Park is a public park in the La Boca district of Buenos Aires, Argentina.

== Overview ==
Historians believe the park's eastern barranca to have been the site of Spanish Conquistador Pedro de Mendoza's landing on what became the first, failed attempt to establish Buenos Aires in 1536. Well to the south of the colonial hamlet, the land was first purchased by Manuel Gallego y Valcárcel around 1790. The lot was later purchased by a succession of English Argentines, the last of whom, Charles Ridgley Horne, improved and expanded the property, raising a baroque mansion on the land's western edge, Defensa Street. Allied to the repressive paramount Governor of Buenos Aires, Juan Manuel de Rosas, Ridgley Horne was forced into exile after the strongman's 1852 overthrow, however, and the land was sold to José Gregorio Lezama, who added adjoining lots to the north and gave the green space its current dimensions.

Lezama commissioned Belgian landscape designer Charles Veerecke to beautify the grounds, planting rows of tipa and jacaranda trees decades before the three species became nearly emblematic of the city at large. Following his 1894 passing, Lezama's widow sold the 8 hectare (20 acre) estate to the city for a token sum, on the condition that the grounds become a park in her late husband's name. The couple's Defensa Street mansion became the Argentine National Museum of History in 1897 and the Municipal Parks Director, the noted French Argentine urbanist Carlos Thays, remodeled the park with gates, a rose garden, a gazebo, a pergola, a sculpture garden and an esplanade in 1904.

The park's surroundings were enhanced by the 1901 inaugural of the Russian Orthodox Church of Buenos Aires and by the addition of a number of buildings in the Second Empire style, notably the one housing the Bar Británico, an English-style Pub still popular among locals. The Canale Biscuit Company factory, a leading neighborhood employer when it opened in 1910, was converted into an arts and commercial complex in 2006.

The 1930s saw the removal of the perimeter gates, as well as the addition of monuments such as the one to Pedro de Mendoza. Lezama Park began to show its age in recent decades, a development dramatized by the theft of a number of the park's many decorative urns and bronzes. Mayor Mauricio Macri announced works to restore the park in 2008. The plan included the reintroduction of perimeter gates modeled on the originals and the addition of a solarium, among other new features. Delays in its implementation, coupled with the growing number of street vendors, continued to blight the park, however.

== Images from the park ==
Monument to Pedro de Mendoza

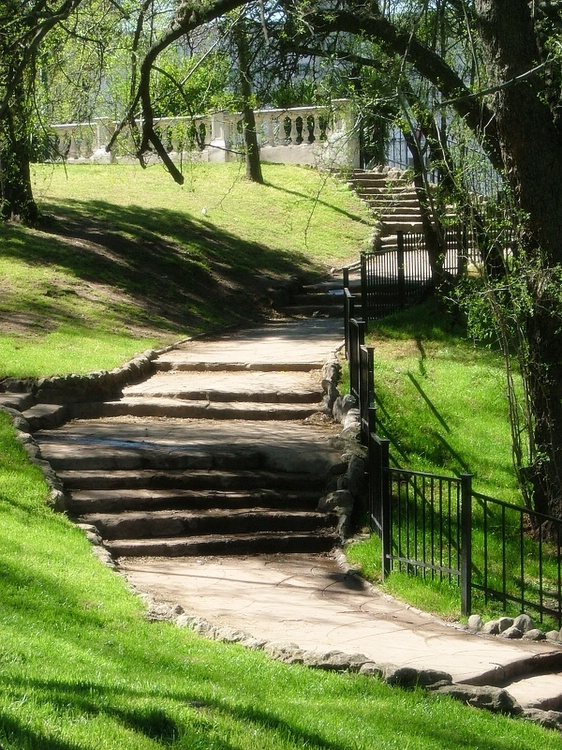
Steps along the barranca

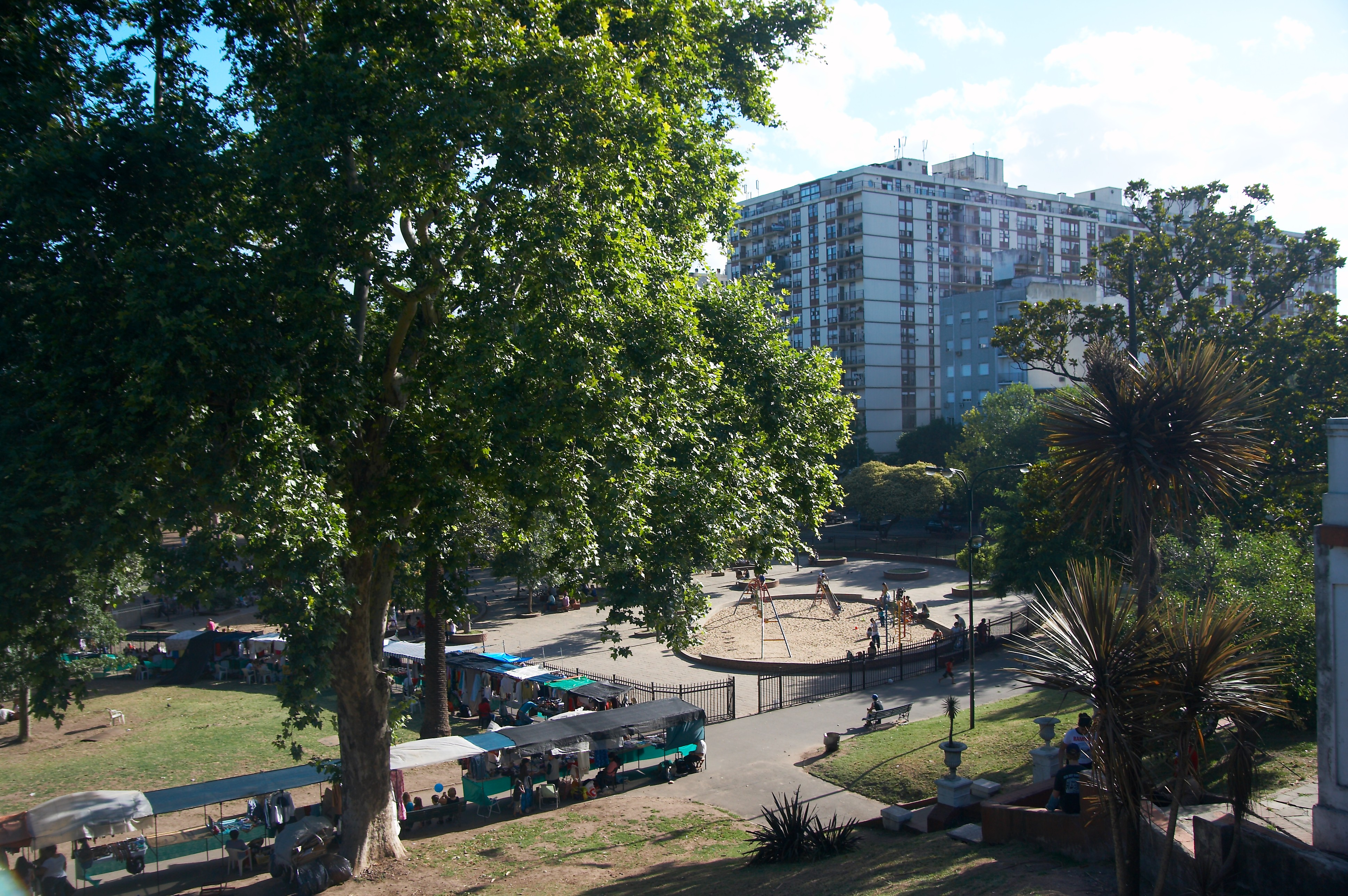
Artists' fair and playground (SW)

=== Facing the park ===
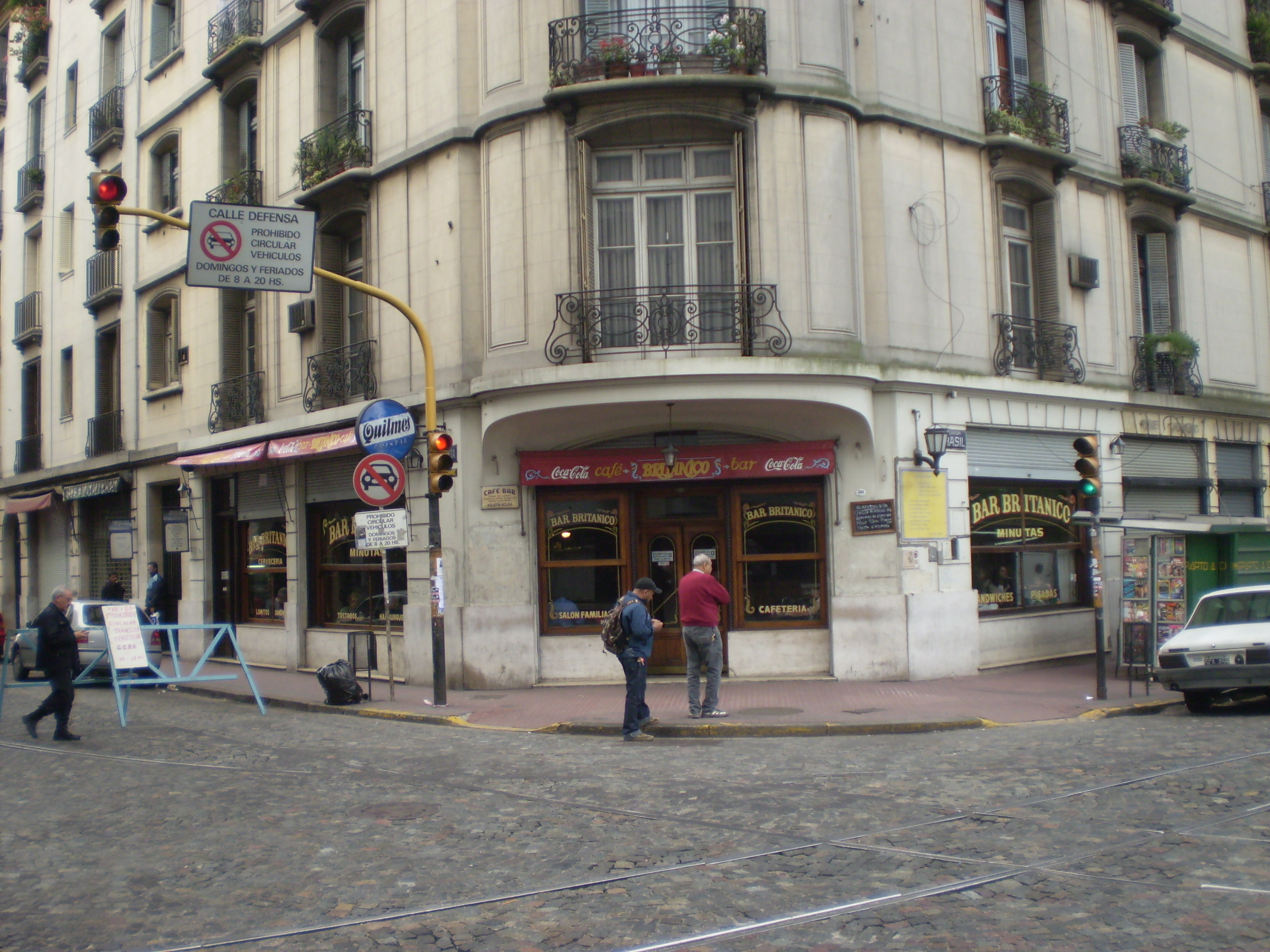
Bar Británico Pub (NW of the park)

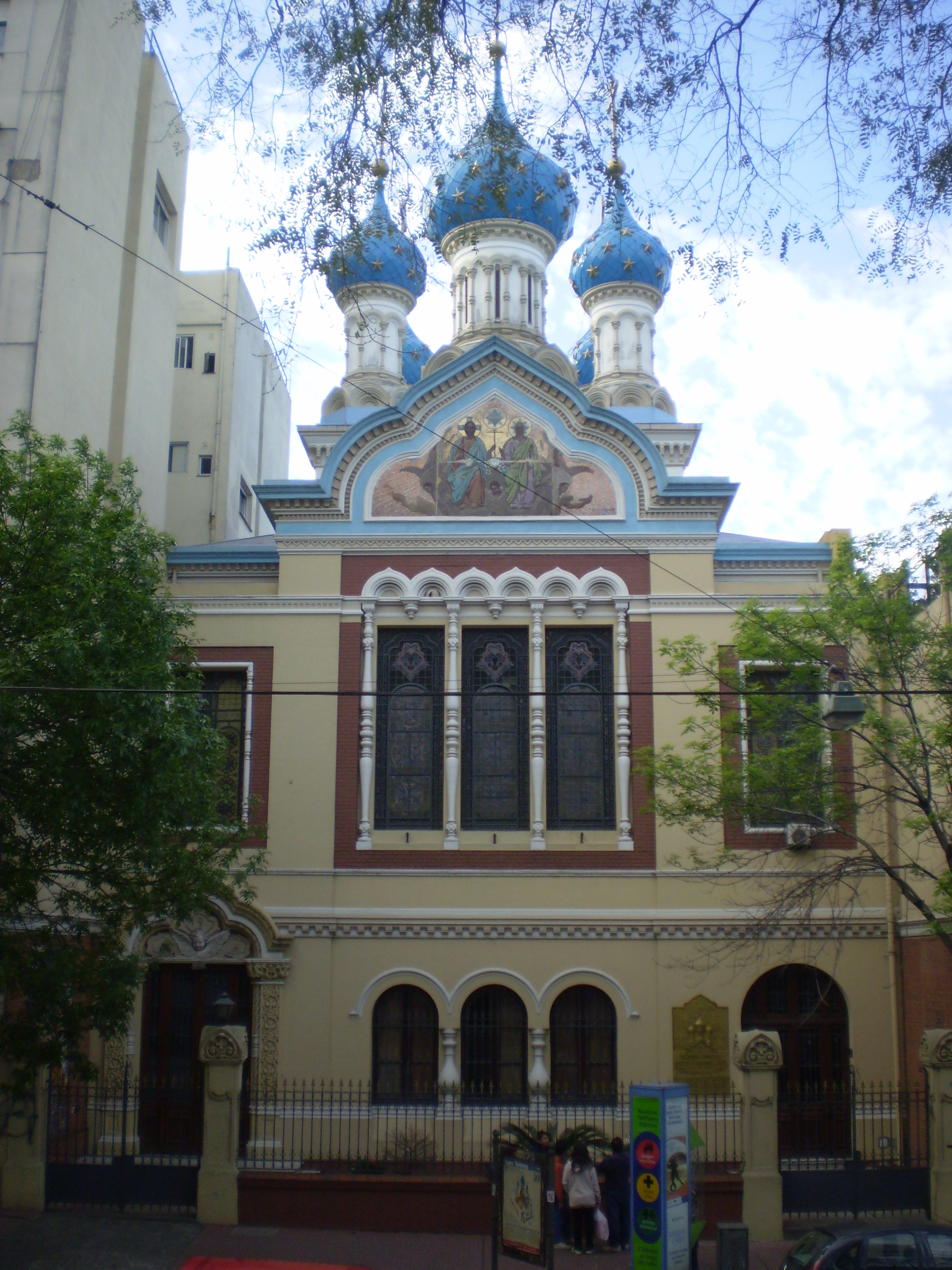
The Buenos Aires Russian Orthodox Church (north)

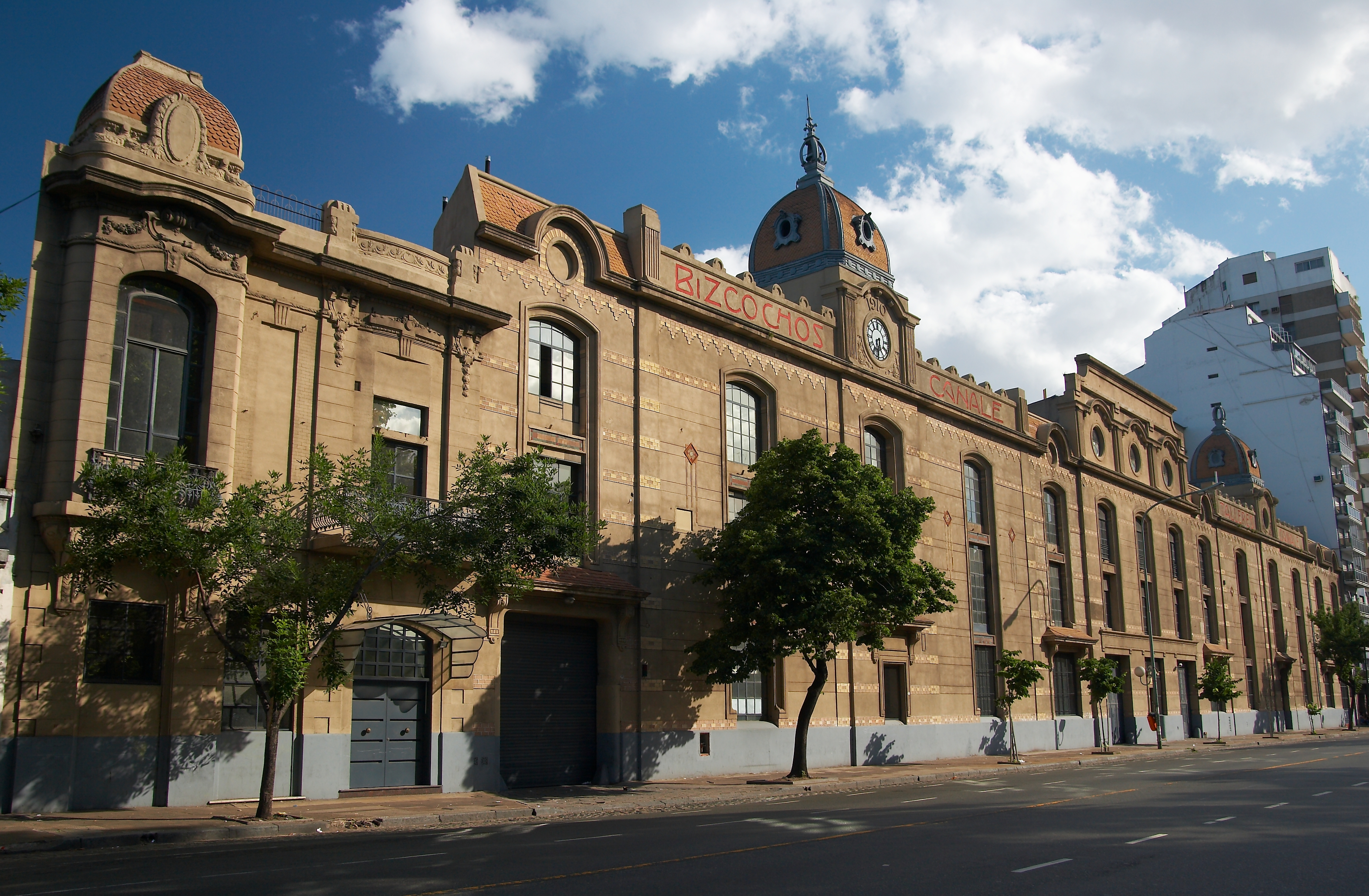
The Canale Biscuit Company Lofts (south)
