= Francisco Seeber =

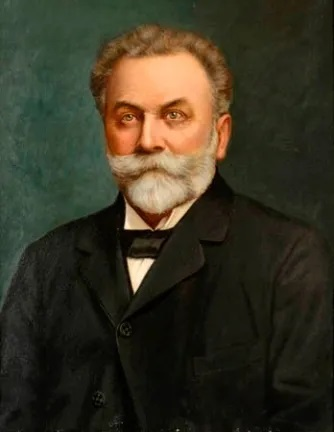

Mayor of Buenos Aires
- In office May 10, 1889 – June 4, 1890
- Preceded by: Guillermo Cranwell
- Succeeded by: Francisco Bollini

Personal details
- Born: November 15, 1841 Buenos Aires
- Died: December 13, 1913 (aged 72) Buenos Aires
- Resting place: La Recoleta Cemetery
- Party: National Autonomist Party
- Spouse: Fanny Agrelo
- Profession: Construction business owner

Military service
- Allegiance: Argentina
- Branch/service: Argentine Army
- Years of service: 1859 — 1866
- Rank: Captain
- Battles/wars: Battle of Cepeda (1859); Paraguayan War

Francisco Seeber (November 15, 1841 – December 13, 1913) was an Argentine military officer, businessman and Mayor of Buenos Aires.

== Life and times ==
Francisco Seeber was born in Buenos Aires to Sophia Taut and Magnus Seeber, both German Argentine immigrants. He completed his studies in Hamburg, Germany, and returned in 1859. He joined the Argentine Army, and fought in the Battle of Cepeda (1859) and as a Captain in the Paraguayan War in 1865 and 1866. Upon his return, he joined the editorial board of La Libertad, and was elected to the Buenos Aires Province Legislature. He married Fanny Agrelo in 1868, and they had nine children.

Seeber established a construction firm, Catalinas Warehouses and Pier Company, Ltd., in 1872. The firm obtained a municipal contract to construct the Catalina Docks (located along what later became the Catalinas Norte office park). Needing a large and steady supply of soil to level and grade the hitherto flood-prone site for the wharf, Seeber bought land in the then-desolate northwest end of the city with the intent of hauling soil to Catalinas for land reclamation. He recruited his workers mostly from Entre Ríos Province; they established a neighborhood (Villa Urquiza) there in 1887.

Seeber was named President of the Buenos Aires Western Railway in 1887. He commissioned the construction of the important rail link between Córdoba and Buenos Aires. He invested in the city's first large-scale department store, Bon Marché, and was appointed Mayor of Buenos Aires on May 10, 1889, by President Miguel Juárez Celman.

He continued his immediate predecessors' emphasis on public works, having 400 blocks of city streets paved, installing sanitation services in the impoverished La Boca district, establishing right-of-way ordinances for the city's growing traffic, and initiating the development of what later became Florida Street (today Buenos Aires' best known pedestrianized street). He also approved plans for what, during the 1920s, became Diagonal Norte Avenue as part of larger (never realized) design for a series of diagonal avenues downtown. Another plan approved during his tenure ultimately became Nueve de Julio Avenue in the 1930s, and his administration also began or completed the creation or improvement of numerous city parks and recreational and cultural sites, among them the Buenos Aires Zoo and the National Historical Museum.

The Panic of 1890 led to Seeber's resignation on June 4, and on June 22, he traveled to Germany. He represented Argentina in the 1894 Universal Peace Congress in Antwerp, where he was an early advocate for free trade. Seeber returned that year and took part in a commission to organize the nation's far-flung territories in Patagonia and the far north. Following an 1897 stay in Europe to study the organization of the Quartermaster Corps, he toured South America for an appreciation of prevailing conditions, about which he wrote in his 1903 survey, Argentina, Brasil, Chile, Uruguay, Perú, Bolivia y Paraguay: estudios comparativos. Seeber, who also wrote numerous articles on his military studies in Europe, was named head of the Quartermaster's Advisory Board in Argentina.

Francisco Seeber retired in Buenos Aires, and died there in 1913 at age 72. He was interred in La Recoleta Cemetery.
