= Federalization of Buenos Aires =

1880 Argentine legal process to make Buenos Aires the national capital

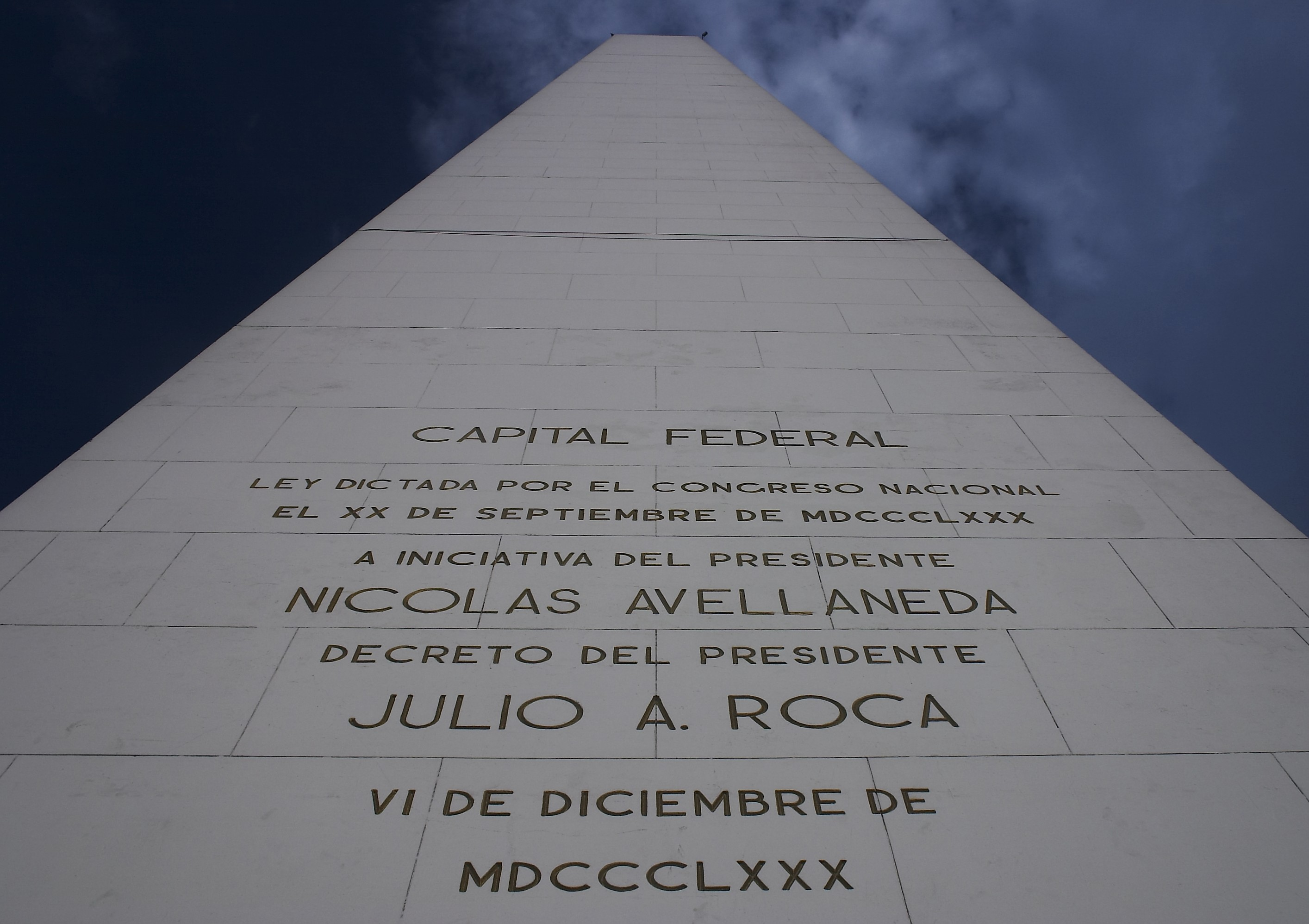
The western facade of the Buenos Aires Obelisk commemorates the federalization of the city.

The federalization of Buenos Aires was the process by which the city of Buenos Aires, until then capital of the Buenos Aires Province, was politically separated from the latter to put it under direct control of the national government as a federal territory. That had been a constant aspiration of the other provinces of Argentina since the formation of the republic. However, harsh political debates around the issue prevented the federalization until 1880, more than sixty years and a long civil war later.

== Argentine Constitution ==
The first successful Constitutional Convention, which took place in 1853, defined in Article 3 the status of Buenos Aires:

The Authorities that exercise the Federal Government reside in the City of Buenos Aires, which is declared capital of the Confederacy by a special law.

The terms Argentine Confederacy were used in those days to designate Argentina (the usage would evolve, and the term Argentine Republic is now used instead). The article could not be enforced, as Buenos Aires withdrew from the convention and formed a separate state. When the province rejoined the country in 1860, an amendment was made to the constitution, which subtly changed Article III:

The Authorities that exercise the Federal Government, reside in the city that is declared Capital of the Republic by a special law of Congress, previous cession made by one or more provincial legislatures from the territory to be federalized.

The change did not declare Buenos Aires as the national capital right away, and it left an open door for another city to be declared so. Although the city was made capital in the end, the change was satisfactory for the porteños as well as the rest of the country and so it remained.

== History ==
=== Buenos Aires and the provinces ===
The weight of a larger population and the economic and commercial importance of the city as the only deep water port of the country were decisive factors in the relationship between the federated provinces. That inequality was seen since the first years of the state, when after the May Revolution the Buenos Aires porteños were reluctant to accept the deputies of the interior in the First Junta, and became more severe during the long period of political instability of the First and Second triumvirates and the Directory. The attempts of 1819 and 1826 to dictate a Unitarian constitution to centralize in Buenos Aires the direct administrative power over the entire national territory pushed the situation, and the political measures taken by the provinces in the successive years, such as the Federal Pact, were oriented on avoiding such situations from taking place.

During the Assembly that dictated the first constitution in 1853, the egalitarian representation with two delegates for each province in the Constitutional Convention provoked the rejection of Buenos Aires, which claimed a representation proportional to the population and considered that its interests were highly threatened by a federal government.

Trying to attenuate the conflict, the constitutional delegates fixed the federal condition of Buenos Aires city not in the constitution itself but though a special law, which was sanctioned a few days after the signature of the constitution.

Buenos Aires ignoring the powers of the constitutional convention drove the province to revolt and to separate from the Argentine Confederation until 1860, when it reincorporated in exchange of several modifications of the original constitutional text and the suspension of the federalization.

=== Federal government, guest in Buenos Aires ===
Between 1860 and 1880, the federal authorities resided in Buenos Aires but lacked direct administrative authority in the territory in which they were located. When Nicolás Avellaneda, candidate of the provinces, was elected for the national elections, the defeated Bartolomé Mitre headed the revolution of 1874. The forces loyal to the federal government defeated Mitre at the Battle of La Verde on November 26, and José Miguel Arredondo at the Battle of Santa Rosa; General Julio Argentino Roca was the most beneficed, victorious at Santa Rosa, he consolidated his political influence that would take him to the presidency for the following mandate.

The relationship between the federal authorities and those of Buenos Aires continued to be hostile; Mitre's Partido Unitario Nacionalista urged for electoral abstention, and Buenos Aires governor Carlos Casares strengthened the separation of his power of administration and police, of the federal one. Avellaneda attempted reconciliation by pardoning the revolutionaries, but the measure had little effect.

When in 1880, Mitre's perspectives of reaching the presidency were again dim, since Avellaneda gave wide support to Roca, an armed confrontation seemed again imminent. Carlos Tejedor, new governor of Buenos Aires and supporter of Mitre, made allusion of the federal government being his guest.

=== Federalization by arms ===
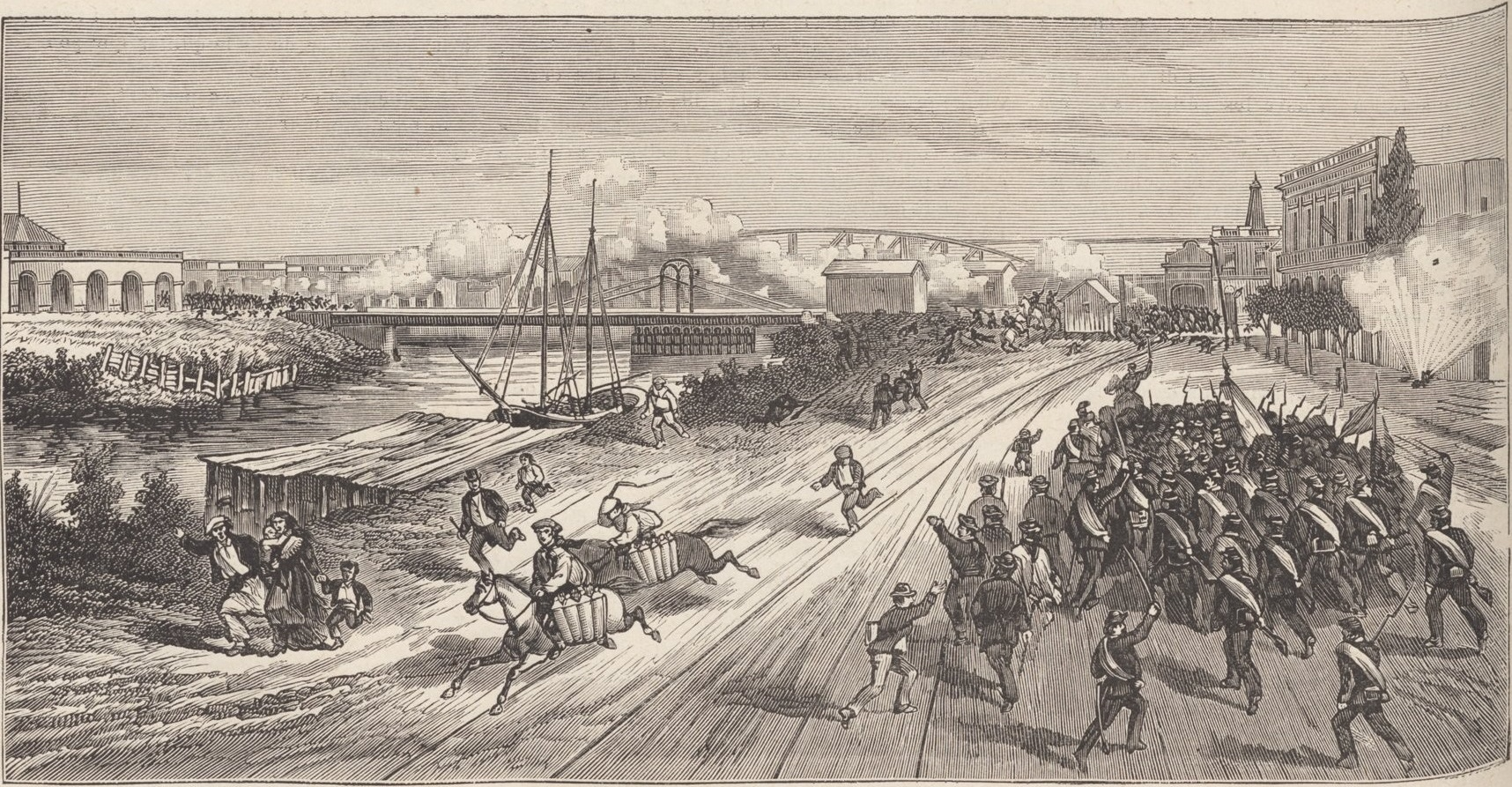
Combat of June 20: Barrancas Bridge's defence by the National Guard of Buenos Ayres.

When Avellaneda's government announced the legislation of the federalization of Buenos Aires city, Governor Tejedor ordered military mobilizations and the formation of militias to train citizens in the use of arms. The National Congress sanctioned a law that prohibited the provinces to mobilize militarily without federal permission, but Buenos Aires ignored the law. When the federal government ordered the confiscation of a boat loaded with arms for the militias, Colonel José Inocencio Arias prevented the action and followed Tejedor's orders.

In response to the belligerent attitude, Avellaneda arranged to temporarily move the federal government to the town of Belgrano, then outside of the city of Buenos Aires (the town was incorporated later, in 1888, to the Federal District, and became a neighborhood of Buenos Aires City). The Senate, Supreme Court and part of the Lower Chamber moved there before the national army, commanded by Roca, besieged Buenos Aires.

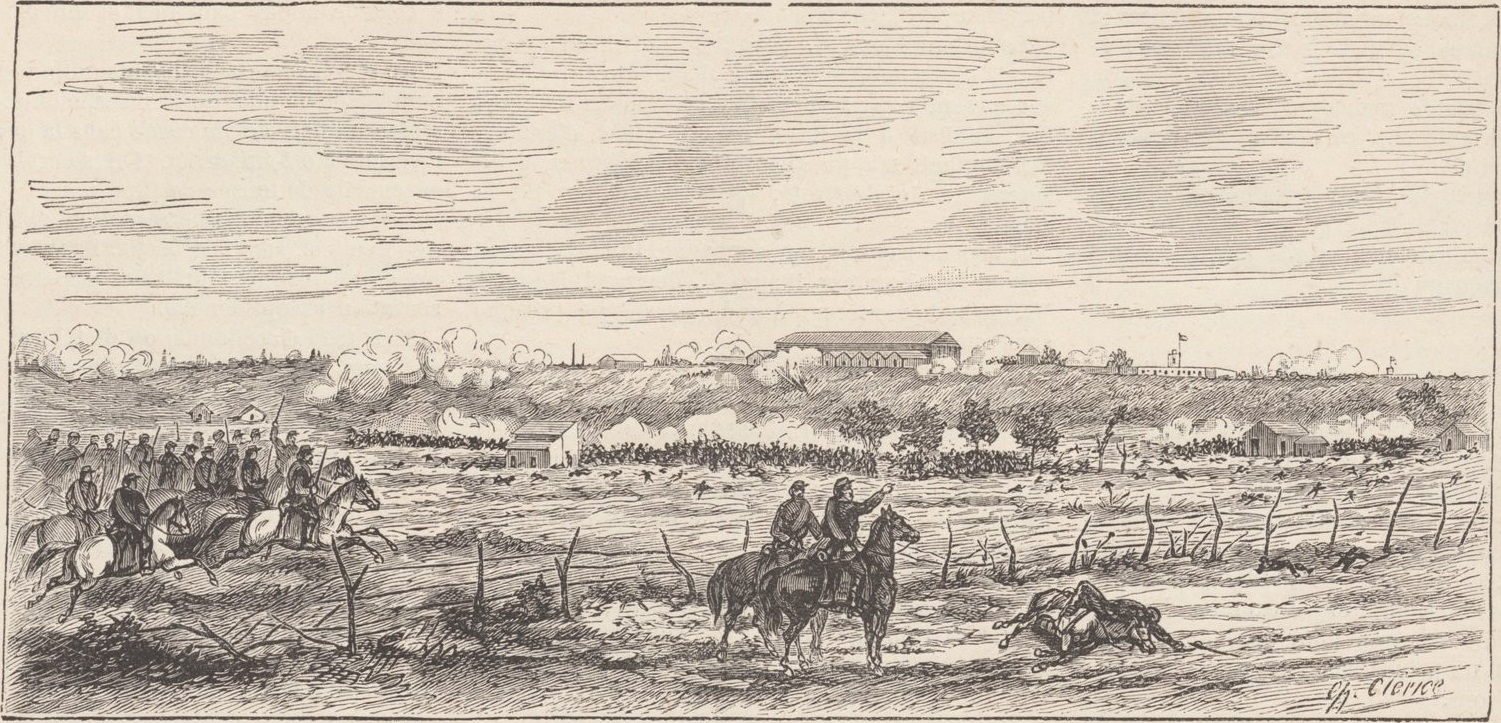
Battle of Los Corrales (June 21): Attack by national troops, near Corrales (Mataderos), defended by the National Guard of Buenos Ayres.

The armed confrontation was bloody. After the Battles of Puente Alsina, Los Corrales and San José de Flores, Tejedor's troops left in defeat.

Though Mitre gave support to the insurrection, he served as mediator during the signature of an agreement for the disarming of the militias and Tejedor's resignation.

The congress, from its provisional location in Belgrano, in a building that now serves as home to the Museo Histórico Sarmiento, dissolved the legislature of Buenos Aires.

On August 24, 1880, Avellaneda presented a law to declare Buenos Aires City the capital of the republic, under direct control of the federal government. On September 21 the law was approved. With the ratification of the city's legislature days later, the city of Buenos Aires was finally separated from its homonymous province, whose capital was moved in 1884 to the city of La Plata, which was built to serve that purpose.

== Later federalization attempts ==
In 1987, President Raúl Alfonsín Proposed moving the national capital to Viedma in an effort to attenuate the population centralization in Buenos Aires that the country has always experienced. The federalization law was approved in May but proved so unpopular that the transfer never took place, and the project was canceled in 1989.
