= Buenos Aires City Hall =

- Palacio Municipal de Buenos Aires
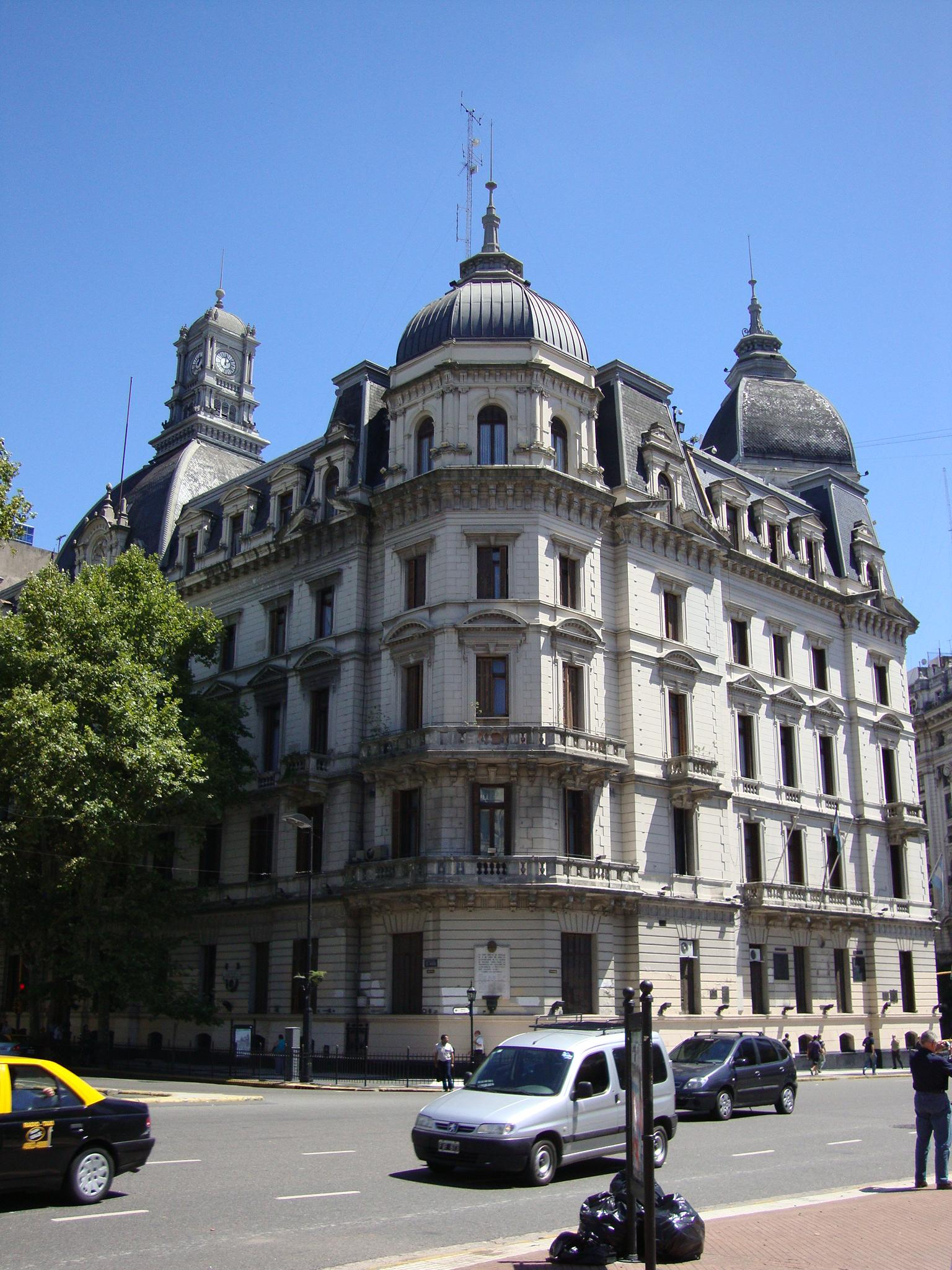
- View from the Plaza de Mayo

- Location within Buenos Aires

General information
- Type: City hall
- Architectural style: Beaux-Arts
- Location: Av. de Mayo 525, Buenos Aires
- Coordinates: 34°36′30″S 58°22′19″W
- Completed: 1914; 112 years ago
- Owner: Government of the City of Buenos Aires

Height
- Height: 48.2 m (clock)

Design and construction
- Architects: Juan Antonio Buschiazzo; Ing. Juan M. Cagnoni
- Architecture firm: Castello y Scala

Buenos Aires City Hall (Spanish: Palacio Municipal de la Ciudad de Buenos Aires; lit. "Municipal Palace") was, until 2015, the seat of the Office of the Chief of Government of Buenos Aires, the capital city of Argentina. From its construction in 1914 to the reformation of the city's constitution in 1996, the building was the seat of the City Municipality. It faces the Plaza de Mayo, across from the Casa Rosada presidential palace, in the barrio of Monserrat.

Since 2015, the Office of the Chief of Government has been located at a new building, Casa de la Ciudad, in the barrio of Parque Patricios. The City Hall still houses various government offices of the city government.

== Building ==
The 1880 Federalization of Buenos Aires was followed by a boom in foreign trade and European immigration, and in 1890, Mayor Francisco P. Bollini commissioned the construction of a new city hall. The building would replace what had been the city government's offices since 1860 - the second floor of police headquarters; the city had grown dramatically since then, and the space had become inadequate.

Bollini's announced project had been immediately preceded by the Panic of 1890, however, and the effect of this crisis on the city's leading source of tax revenue British investment, led to plans of a relatively modest scale. Among the cost-saving measures was the city's enlistment of the Assistant Minister of Public Works, Juan Cagnoni, as chief architect, as well as the decision to build on the site of the outmoded police headquarters. Decorative tilework and chandeliers from the adjacent Zuberbühler house, which had recently been expropriated to make way for the Avenida de Mayo, were likewise salvaged for use in the upcoming city hall (where they remain to the present day).

The cornerstone laying ceremony was held on New Year's Eve 1890, for which the Mayor contributed a time capsule which included the construction permit among other mementoes. The works themselves cost the city a modest 150,000 pesos (US$75,000), and were completed in 1892. Inaugurated in March 1893, the new city hall originally housed 860 m^{2} (9,200 ft^{2}), and was only a little more spacious than the earlier offices. This problem was ultimately resolved by the 1911 acquisition of an adjacent residential lot, which allowed the expansion of the city hall to nearly double. Designed in the same Second Empire style with which Cagnoni designed the first part, the engineering firm of Bonneu Ibero, Parodi & Figini completed the annex in 1914. A connection to the adjacent House of Culture was opened following the latter's acquisition by the city in 1988.

== Government ==
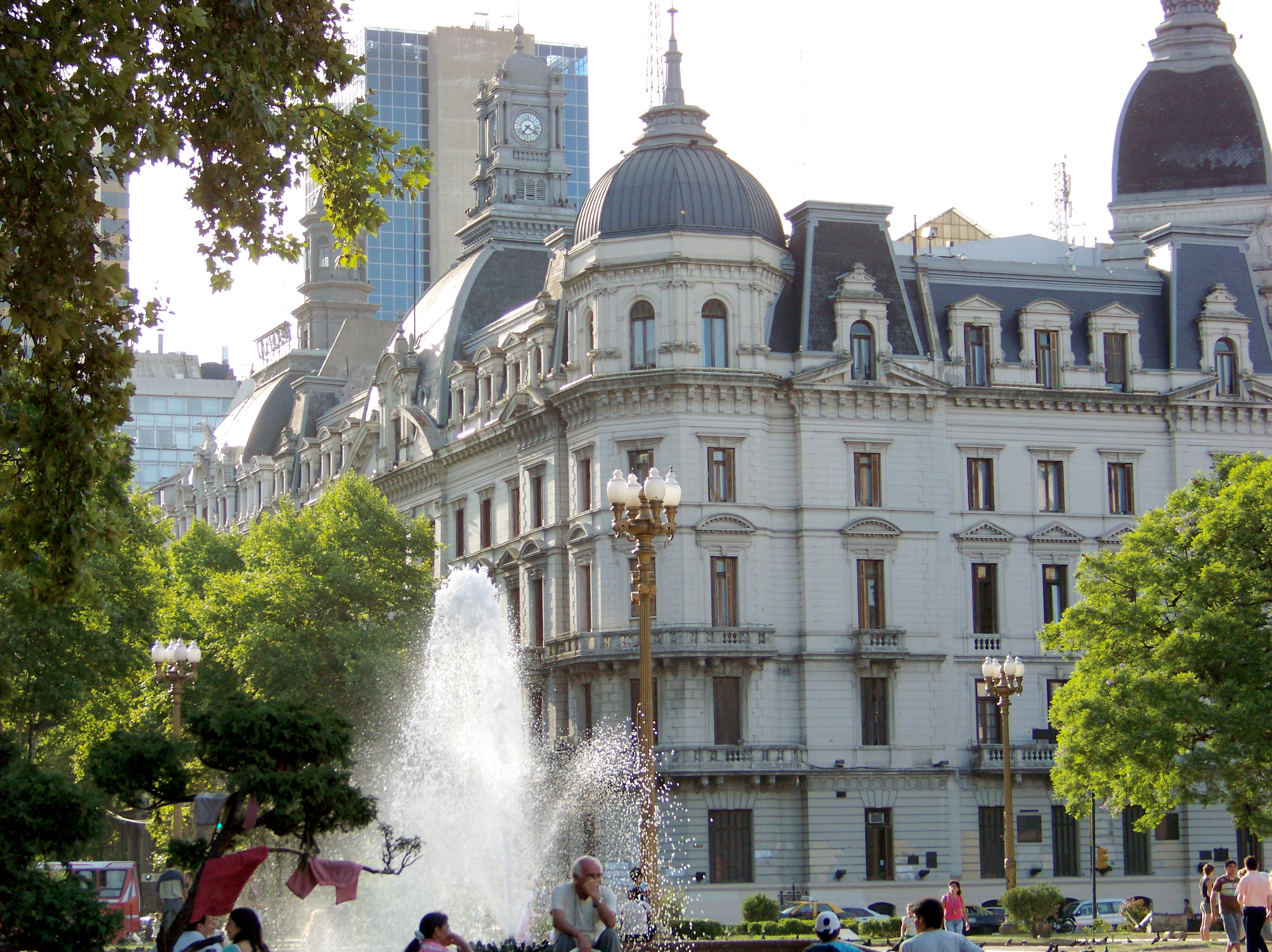
View of the Building

The 1880 Federalization of Buenos Aires, enacted in a bid to end the internecine warfare between those who favored a united Argentina with a strong central government (Unitarios) and Buenos Aires Province leaders who favored an independent nation of their own (Federales), resulted in President Julio Roca's passage in 1882 of National Law 1260, which created the presidential prerogative of the appointment of the Mayor of Buenos Aires (though with a locally elected city council).

This remained the city's governing structure in 1993, when former President Raúl Alfonsín prevailed on his successor, President Carlos Menem, to agree to a limited devolution of governing powers to the city (the Olivos Pact). Accordingly, the 1994 reform of the Argentine Constitution included article 129, which guaranteed Buenos Aires greater self-governance. The Indentente (appointed Mayor) was replaced by a Jefe de Gobierno (elected Mayor), and the city council by the Buenos Aires City Legislature. Shortly before the historic, June 30, 1996, elections to these posts, however, a senior Peronist Senator, Antonio Cafiero, succeeded in limiting the city's autonomy by advancing National Law 24.588, which reserved control of the 25,000-strong Policía Federal (the federally administered city police), the Port of Buenos Aires and other faculties to the national government.

The controversial bill, signed in 1996 by President Menem, remained a sticking point between successive Presidents (most of whom have been Peronist) and Buenos Aires Mayors (none of whom have been). A 2005 agreement on principles between Mayor Aníbal Ibarra and President Néstor Kirchner was followed by the modification of the especially contentious article 7, which denied the city its own, local police force, in 2007 - though the "Cafiero Law" otherwise remains in force. Efforts since 2007 by Mayor Mauricio Macri to declare it unconstitutional have thus far failed, and though the Mayor inaugurated a Metropolitan Police, issues of revenue sharing for its financing remain pending.

== See also ==
- Casa de la Ciudad – new seat of the Buenos Aires City Government
- Buenos Aires City Legislature Palace – seat of the city's legislature
