= Casa de la Ciudad (Buenos Aires) =

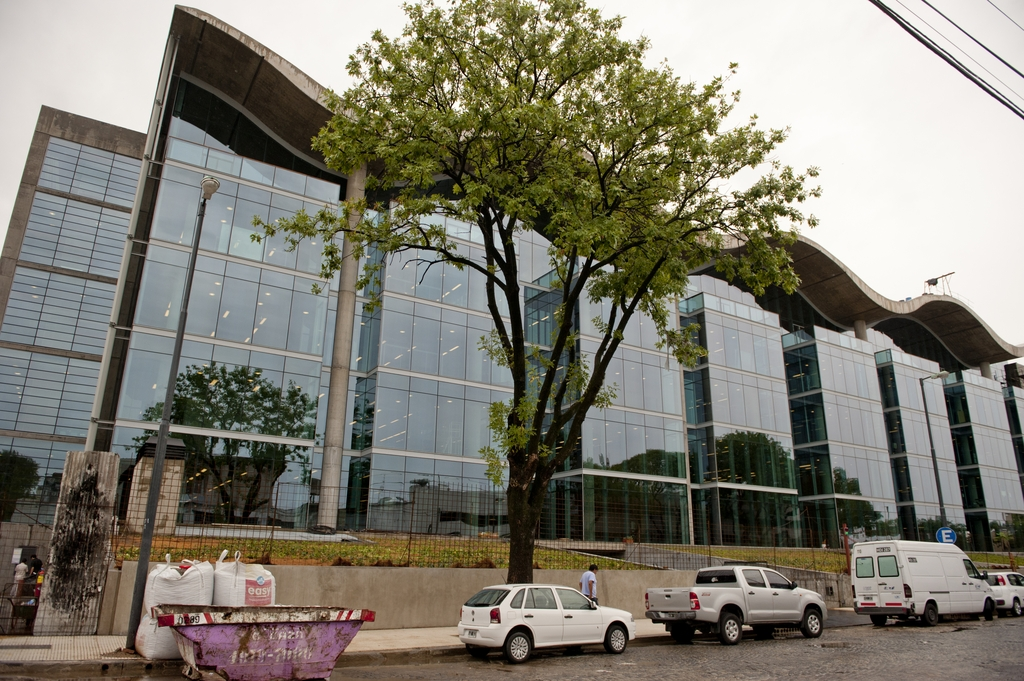

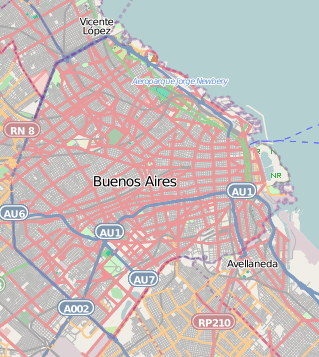
- Location within Buenos Aires

General information
- Type: City hall
- Architectural style: Neomodern
- Location: Uspallata 3160, Buenos Aires
- Coordinates: 34.6407°S 58.407°W
- Completed: 2015; 11 years ago
- Inaugurated: 1 April 2015
- Cost: $250 million
- Owner: Government of the City of Buenos Aires

Design and construction
- Architecture firm: Foster and Partners

The Casa de la Ciudad (English: City House) is the seat of the Office of the Chief of Government of Buenos Aires, the capital city of Argentina. Built as a neomodern and sustainable complex by British firm Foster and Partners, it was inaugurated in 2015 to replace the old Buenos Aires City Hall.

It is located in the Parque Patricios neighbourhood and serves as the main administrative headquarters of the City Government, housing the offices of the Chief and Vice‑Chief of Government as well as numerous ministries and secretariats.

== Name ==
Originally referred to as the "Edificio Foster", the official name "Casa de la Ciudad" was chosen through a participatory process involving local residents. From three options (Centro Cívico Parque Patricios, Casa de la Ciudad, and Edificio Jacarandá), the winning name secured 43% of nearly 8,939 votes. The designation was formalized by law in December 2020 and enacted by the City Legislature in January 2021.

The building complex is sometimes referred to by the street in which it is located, Uspallata. "Uspallata" is also sometimes used in media as a metonym for the City Government and the mayor's office as a whole.

== History ==
The building was originally conceived as the new headquarters of the Banco Ciudad. In February 2010, the bank launched a design-and-price competition for the project, which was intended to shorten construction times while selecting a proposal within a fixed maximum budget. The construction company CRIBA invited the local firms Berdichevsky Cherny and Edgardo Minond, together with the London-based studio Foster + Partners, to develop the proposal. After a 90-day process, the team won the competition with a score of 9.90 out of 10.

Although construction began as a bank headquarters project, the building's purpose changed before completion. In October 2014, CRIBA was informed that the structure would instead become the new seat of the Government of the City of Buenos Aires, after Banco Ciudad decided to remain in the city centre and the planned civic centre on the grounds of the Hospital Borda faced legal complications. The original design was largely preserved, with modifications including the removal of a planned ground-floor bar, changes to service and archive areas, and adaptations to the third-floor offices for government use.

The building was completed in 2015 on the block bounded by Uspallata, Los Patos, Atuel and Iguazú streets in Parque Patricios, within the city's Distrito Tecnológico. Designed by Norman Foster's studio with local associates, it became the seat of the head of government and other city ministries and secretariats. The city's official tourism site describes it as a sustainable public building of 38,000 square metres, built to environmental standards associated with LEED certification.

== Use ==
The Casa de la Ciudad functions as the seat of the Government of the City of Buenos Aires, having replaced the old City Hall in Montserrat in 2020. In addition to housing the offices of the Chief of Government (mayor), the building is used by other ministries and secretariats of the city administration. The relocation of the city government to the building was presented by city officials as part of a broader strategy to strengthen the historically less-developed southern area of Buenos Aires and consolidate the surrounding "Distrito Tecnológico".

The building's internal layout is organized around large open-plan workspaces, terraced office floors, internal circulation routes, and planted courtyards intended to encourage communication between departments and reduce dependence on artificial lighting. It also includes support facilities such as a cafeteria, a dining room for staff, a gymnasium, a multipurpose hall, around 400 parking spaces, and an auditorium with interior and exterior access and capacity for approximately 300 people.

== See also ==
- Buenos Aires City Hall – former seat of the Buenos Aires City Government
- Buenos Aires City Legislature Palace – seat of the city's legislature
