= Emmanuel Ferrario =

Argentine politician and political scientist

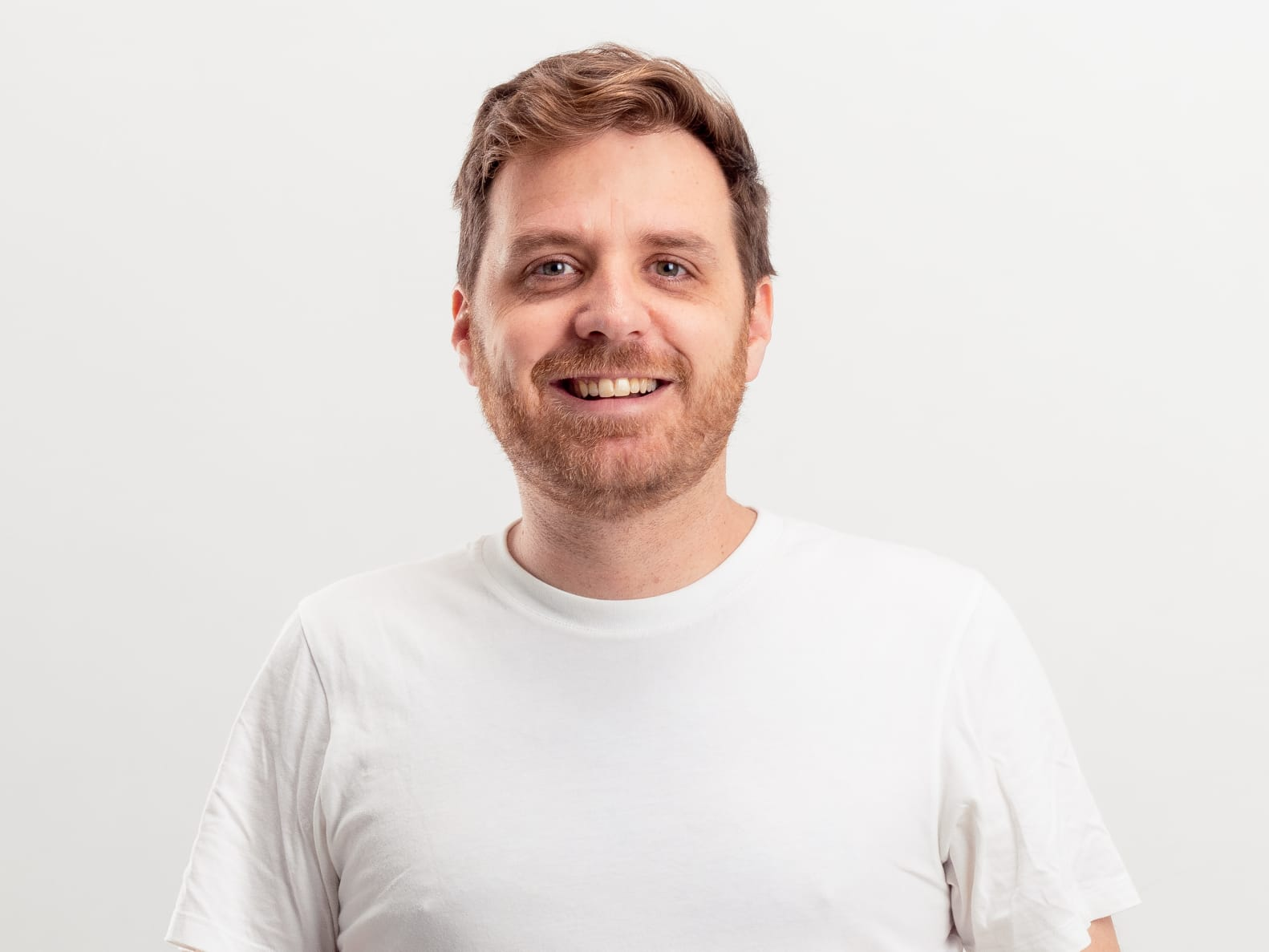

Legislator of the City of Buenos Aires
- Incumbent
- Assumed office 10 December 2021

Personal details
- Born: 8 June 1985 (age 40) Rafael Obligado, Buenos Aires, Argentina
- Party: Republican Proposal
- Other political affiliations: Juntos por el Cambio (since 2015)

Emmanuel Alberto Ferrario (born 8 June 1985) is an Argentine politician who has served as a member of the Buenos Aires City Legislature since 2021. He is a member of Republican Proposal (PRO).

== Early life and career ==
Ferrario was born in Rafael Obligado, a small town of about 700 inhabitants in the Rojas Partido of Buenos Aires Province. He studied International Relations at Universidad Torcuato Di Tella. Before entering politics he worked at Techint. He additionally counts with a Master of Public Administration degree from Harvard University and a Master of International Policy degree from Stanford University.

Starting in 2009 he was a legislative aide for national deputy Ricardo Gil Lavedra. Upon his return to Argentina after finishing his studies, he applied for a position in the Buenos Aires City Government through LinkedIn. From 2016 he was Undersecretary of Administration Coordination of Buenos Aires Province, under the leadership of Governor María Eugenia Vidal. He also worked as chief of advisors for Buenos Aires Chief of Government Horacio Rodríguez Larreta.

In the 2021 Buenos Aires elections he ran for a seat in the Buenos Aires City Legislature as the first candidate in the Juntos por el Cambio list. He was elected with 46.83% of the votes.

== Personal life ==
Ferrario is openly gay.

== Electoral history ==
Electoral history of Emmanuel Ferrario
| Election | Office | List | # | District | Votes | | | Result | Ref. |
| Election | Office | List | # | District | Total | % | P. | Result | Ref. |
|---|---|---|---|---|---|---|---|---|---|
| 2021 | City Legislator | Juntos por el Cambio | 1 | City of Buenos Aires | 891,983 | 46.83% | 1st (Note: Presented on an electoral list. The data shown represents the share of the vote the entire party/alliance received in that constituency.) | Elected | |
| 2025 | City Legislator | Let's Come Back Buenos Aires | 3 | City of Buenos Aires | 132,788 | 8.08% | 4th | Elected | |
