= Rojas, Buenos Aires =

Rojas
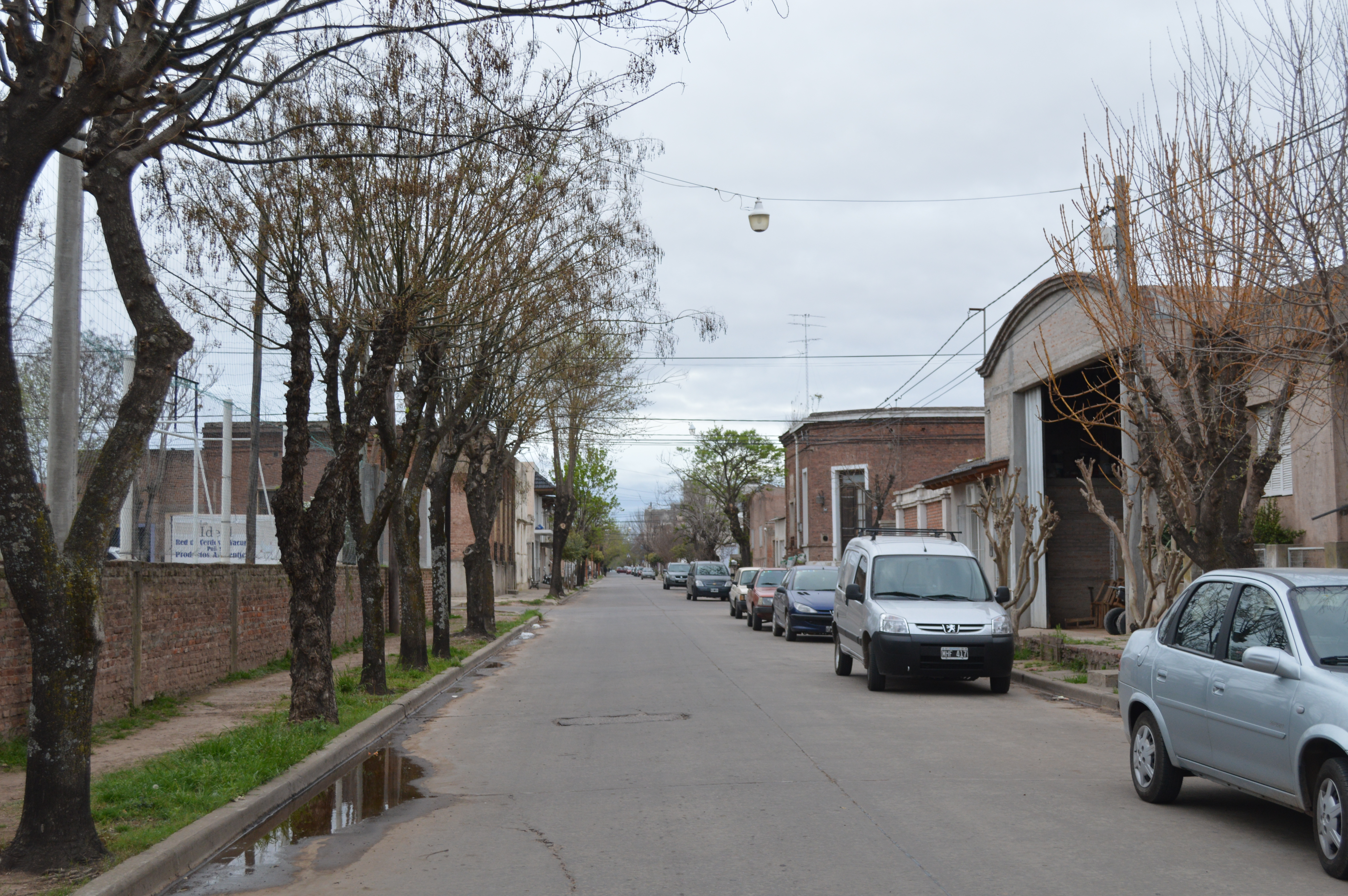

- Flag Coat of arms

- Location in Argentina Rojas (Buenos Aires Province)
- Coordinates: 34°11′S 60°44′W
- Country: Argentina
- Province: Buenos Aires
- Partido: Rojas
- Founded: December 20, 1777
- Elevation: 56 m (184 ft)

Population (2001 census [INDEC])
  - Total: 18,708
- CPA Base: B 2705
- Area code: +54 2475

Rojas is a town located in the north-east of the Buenos Aires Province, Argentina. It is the administrative seat of Rojas Partido.

== Geography ==
=== Climate ===
The town has a humid subtropical climate.
