= Ofelia Fernández =

Argentine politician and activist

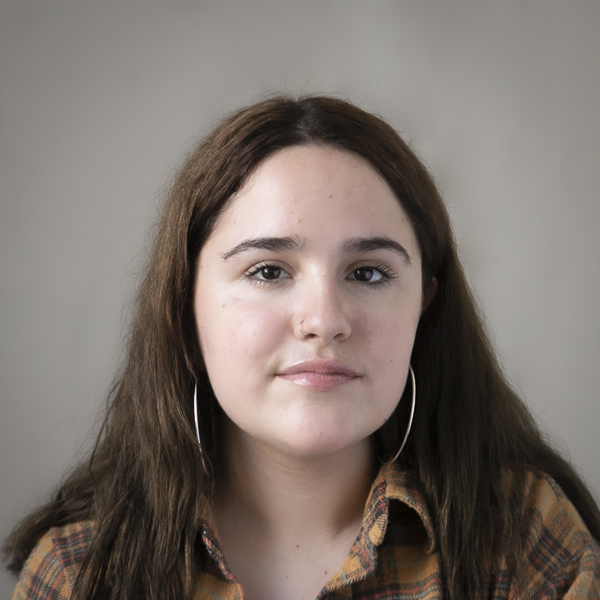

Legislator of the City of Buenos Aires
- In office 10 December 2019 – 10 December 2023

Personal details
- Born: 14 April 2000 (age 26) Buenos Aires, Argentina
- Party: Patria Grande Front (2019–present)
- Other political affiliations: Frente de Todos (2019–2023); Union for the Homeland (2023–present)

Ofelia Fernández (born 14 April 2000) is an Argentine politician and political activist. She is the youngest member of the Buenos Aires City Legislature, having been elected on 27 October 2019, at 19 years of age.

== Early life and education ==
Ofelia Fernández was born on 14 April 2000, as the daughter of a musician father and a bureau de change employee mother. She attained her high school degree at the Escuela Superior de Comercio Carlos Pellegrini. At High school she became the school's youngest president of the student body and the first one to be re-elected. As a student body president she got often involved in student strikes.

== Political career ==
As an activist and feminist, Fernández participated in the demonstrations in support of the legalization of abortion in Argentina, and spoke at the commission-level debate during the treatment of the 2018 bill at the National Congress. Fernandez was also the youngest speaker at the G20 counter-summit organized by the Latin American Council of Social Sciences in November 2018.

Fernández was the third candidate in the Peronist Frente de Todos coalition's party list for the City Legislature 2019 election. She cast her first vote during the Primary elections in August. She was elected to the city legislature on 27 October 2019, commencing her legislative term on 10 December of the same year. Following her election to the legislature, Fernández was then highlighted by various sources as "the youngest legislator in Latin America."

Fernández is a member of Vamos, a left-wing group organized within the Patria Grande Front. Within the City Legislature, she sits in the Frente de Todos parliamentary bloc.

During the 2023 election, she supported Juan Grabois for the presidency in the Unión por la Patria primary. Juan Grabois and Sergio Massa agreed a common list for national and citywide legislators and Fernández was left out.

== Electoral history ==
Electoral history of Ofelia Fernández
Election	Office	List	#	District	Votes			Result	Ref.
Election	Office	List	#	District	Total	%	P.	Result	Ref.
2019	City Legislator	Frente de Todos	3	City of Buenos Aires	667,732	33.88%	2nd (Note: Presented on an electoral list. The data shown represents the share of the vote the entire party/alliance received in that constituency.)	Elected	
