= Victoria Montenegro =

Argentine politician

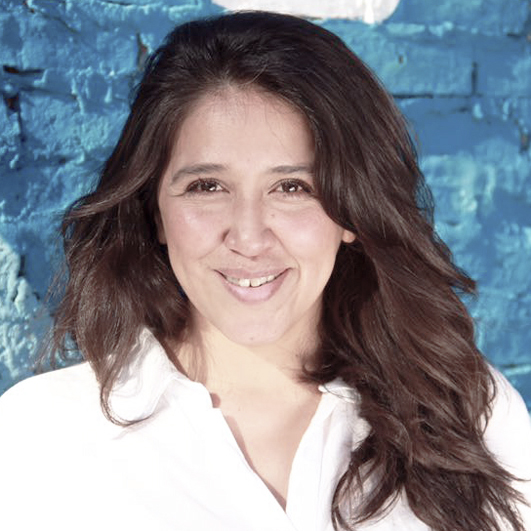

Legislator of the City of Buenos Aires
- In office 10 December 2017 – 10 December 2025

Personal details
- Born: Hilda Victoria Montenegro; 31 January 1976 (age 50) Hurlingham, Buenos Aires Province, Argentina
- Party: Kolina (2011–present)
- Other political affiliations: Front for Victory (2011–2017); Unidad Porteña (2017–2019); Frente de Todos (2019–2023); Union for the Homeland (2023–present)

Hilda Victoria Montenegro (born 31 January 1976) is an Argentine politician. She was a member of the Buenos Aires City Legislature from 2017 to 2025. She is a member of the Kolina party.

Montenegro is the daughter of two "desaparecidos", alleged political dissidents of the constitutional government of María Estela Martínez de Perón. Raised under a false name by a family linked to the dictatorship, Montenegro discovered her true identity in 2000 with the help of the Grandmothers of the Plaza de Mayo, becoming the 66th grandchild to have their identity restored.

== Early life ==
Hilda Victoria Montenegro was born on 31 January 1976 in Hurlingam, Buenos Aires Province, daughter of Roque Orlando Montenegro and Hilda Ramona Argentina Torres. Her parents were originally from Salta, they were both active in the ERP-PRT. On 13 February 1976, during the constitutional government of María Estela Martínez de Perón, when Victoria was only 13 days old, she and her parents were kidnapped from their home by the military; her parents were "disappeared", and she was illegally appropriated and given to an army colonel, Herman Antonio Tetzlaff.

She was raised by Tetzlaff and his wife, María del Carmen Eduartes, as their own daughter, under the name of "María Sol Tetzlaff". Growing up, she wanted to join the Army, but ultimately didn't due to recurrent anxiety attacks.

=== Restoration of her identity ===
In 1993, the Grandmothers of the Plaza de Mayo accused Tetzlaff of illegal appropriation of minors in the framework of the 1976–83 dictatorship, and Montenegro – then still known as María Sol, aged 16 – was forced to take a blood test, which was then run through the Grandmothers' genetic data bank. In 2000, the results showed she was not Tetzlaff and Eduartes' biological daughter, and her real parents were Roque Montenegro and Hilda Torres; she was the 66th grandchild whose identity was restored by the Grandmothers. She initially refused to co-operate in the trial against Tetzlaff – which eventually led to his imprisonment – and kept going by María Sol. She met her biological parents' family for the first time in 2001.

Roque Montenegro's body was found in a mass grave in Colonia del Sacramento, Uruguay, in 2012. Evidence suggests he was a victim of a death flight. Her mother remains missing.

== Political career ==
Montenegro's involvement in politics began in 2008, when she got a job at the Ministry of Social Development. In 2011 she joined Kolina, a kirchnerist political party founded by Alicia Kirchner. She became the party's Human Rights secretary, and in 2013, she was the fifth candidate in the Front for Victory (FPV) list for the Argentine Chamber of Deputies in the City of Buenos Aires. From 2014 to 2015 she was head of the National Coordination Unit for Prevention, Assistance and the Eradication of Violence against Women of the National Women's Council (Spanish: Consejo Nacional de las Mujeres, CNM).

She was a candidate to the Chamber of Deputies again in 2015, this time as the fourth candidate in the FPV list. However, once again the list didn't receive enough votes for her to be elected.

Ahead of the 2017 legislative election in Buenos Aires, Montenegro was selected to be the third candidate in the Unidad Porteña list for the Buenos Aires City Legislature; the list won the simultaneous and mandatory primaries on 13 August and, on the general election, received 21.26% of the vote – enough for Montenegro to be elected. She was sworn in on 5 December 2017.

As of 2020, she was the national vice president of Kolina. In the 2021 elections, Montenegro was re-elected to the City Legislature on the Frente de Todos list, as the second candidate behind Alejandro Amor.

== Personal life ==
Montenegro and her husband, Gustavo, have three sons: Gonzalo, Sebastián and Santiago.

== Electoral history ==
Electoral history of Victoria Montenegro
Election	Office	List	#	District	Votes			Result	Ref.
Election	Office	List	#	District	Total	%	P.	Result	Ref.
2013	National Deputy	Front for Victory	5	City of Buenos Aires	395,664	21.62%	3rd (Note: Presented on an electoral list. The data shown represents the share of the vote the entire party/alliance received in that constituency.)	Not elected	
2015	National Deputy	Front for Victory	4	City of Buenos Aires	437,380	22.37%	2nd	Not elected	
2017	City Legislator	Unidad Porteña	3	City of Buenos Aires	408,462	21.26%	2nd	Elected	
2021	City Legislator	Frente de Todos	2	City of Buenos Aires	484,950	25.46%	2nd	Elected	

== See also ==
- List of kidnappings
