= La Bola de Nieve =

Coordinates: 32.947534°S 60.633658°W

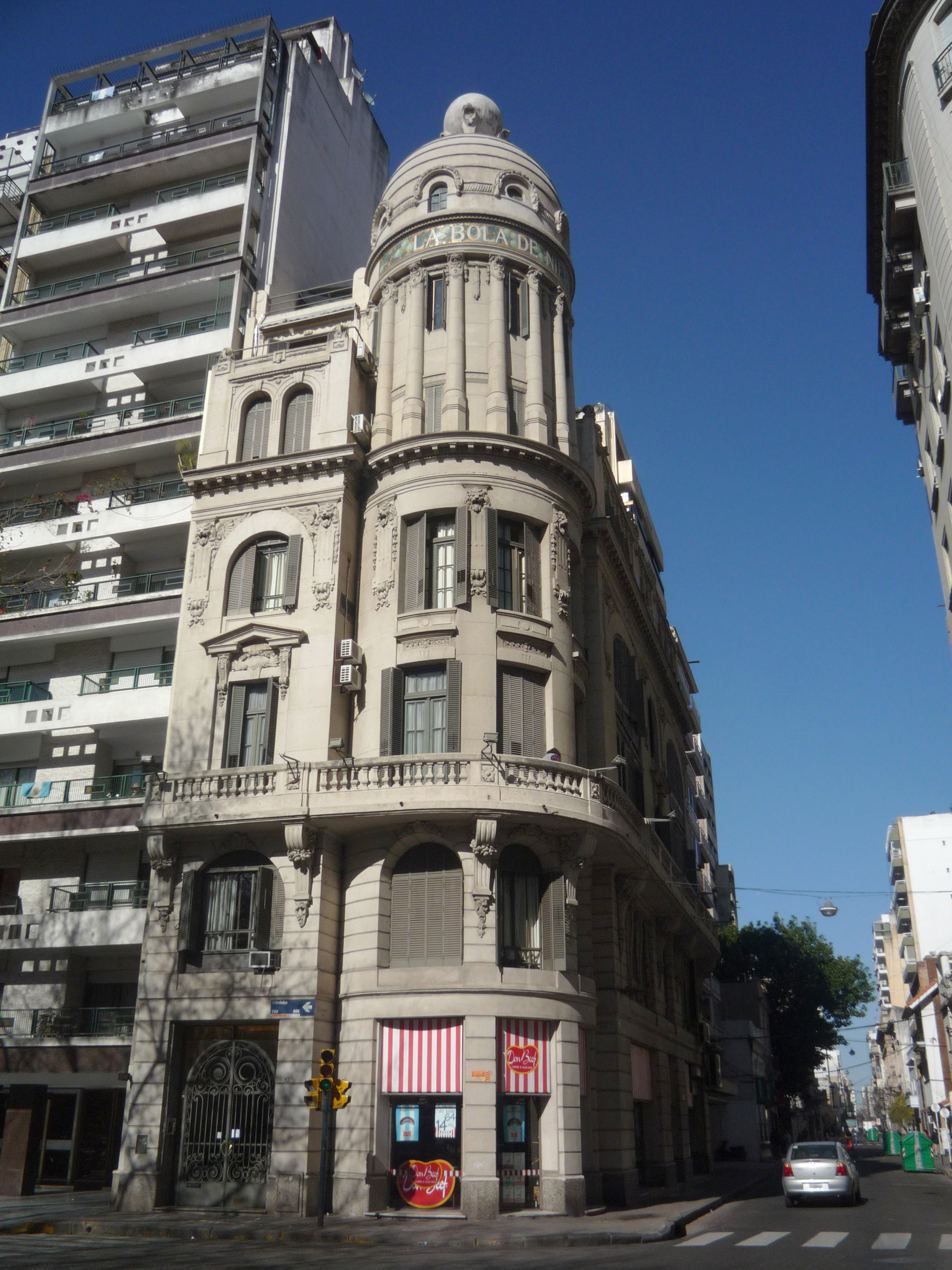
La Bola de Nieve

La Bola de Nieve (Spanish, literally The Snowball) is a historical building in the city of Rosario, Santa Fe Province, Argentina. Its name alludes to the presence of a large stone sphere on its top.

The building is located in the corner of Laprida St. and Córdoba St., at the edge of the downtown area, in front of Plaza 25 de Mayo. It was built in 1907, and commissioned by Camilo Guani, owner and founder of the financial institution that bore the name of Bola de Nieve; to a French-born architect by the name of Édouard Le Monnier, this mutual fund company had the tallest building in the city at the time it was built.

The top of the building is a cylindrical body held up by columns and crowned by a sphere. Beneath and around the sphere, the name of the companyBola de Nieveis spelled out in large, white block letters, on a background of ceramic tiles

Cúpula de La Bola de Nieve
