= Rafael Obligado, Buenos Aires =

Town in Buenos Aires Province, Argentina

Rafael Obligado
- Location in Argentina
- Coordinates: 34°21′S 60°47′W
- Country: Argentina
- Province: Buenos Aires
- Partido: Rojas
- Founded: 20 March 1887
- Elevation: 61 m (200 ft)

Population (2010 census [INDEC])
  - Total: 901
- CPA Base: B 6001
- Area code: +54 2475

Rafael Obligado (formerly Esteban Echeverría and simply Echeverría) is a town in Rojas Partido in Buenos Aires Province, Argentina. It is named after Rafael Obligado, an Argentine poet and playwright.

== History ==
Founded on 20 March 1887, the town was first named in honor of poet and writer Esteban Echeverría. Later, the name of the town was cut short to Echeverría. In the late 1920s, the town was renamed in honor of playwright and poet Rafael Obligado; the name change was in large part made to avoid confusion with Esteban Echeverría Partido, also in Buenos Aires Province.

== Fiesta Provincial de la Galleta ==
Every November since 1971, a biscuit festival is held in Rafael Obligado. The event includes traditional parades, shows, the election of a "queen", and a lunch of asado and traditional biscuits from the region. The fiesta is an opportunity for a reunion of members of the region and those who have left it for work or personal reasons.

== Notable people ==
- Lisandro López (born 1983), footballer
- Emmanuel Ferrario (born 1985), politician
