= Evolución (political coalition) =

Political coalition in Argentina

Evolución Ciudadana Evolución
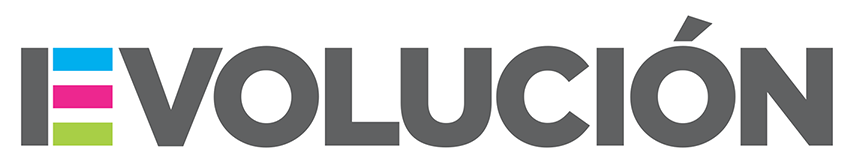
- Leader: Martin Lousteau
- Founded: 12 June 2017
- Dissolved: 2019
- Preceded by: Energía Ciudadana Organizada
- Headquarters: City of Buenos Aires
- Ideology: Social democracy
- Political position: Centre-left
- Members: Radical Civic Union; Socialist Party
- Buenos Aires City Legislature: 9 / 60
- National Deputies: 3 / 25
- Senators: 1 / 3

Website
- official site (Spanish)

Evolución Ciudadana or simply Evolución , was an Argentine political coalition founded by Martin Lousteau in the City of Buenos Aires.

Currently, under the name Radical Evolution, is the internal radical group led by Martín Lousteau, that governs the Radical Civic Union in the district of Buenos Aires.

== History ==
It was founded in 2015 as Organized Citizen Energy, or simply ECO, to compete against Horacio Rodriguez Larreta in the 2015 City of Buenos Aires elections. The coalition was made up of Public Trust, Radical Civic Union, Civic Coalition ARI, Socialist Party and the Authentic Socialist Party.

In 2017 ECO was renamed Evolution, and now it is only made up of the UCR (led by Lousteau) and the PS (led by Roy Cortina), because Elisa Carrió (Civic Coalition) and Ocaña (Public Trust) joined Vamos Juntos.

The coalition ran in the legislative elections of 2017, winning three seats in the Chamber of Deputies.

Evolución integrates the "Radical Evolution" bloc, in the Chamber of Deputies of Argentina.

Evolución joined the Juntos por el Cambio coalition for the 2019 Argentine general election, electing Martin Lousteau to the Senate and expanding its caucus in the Legislature to 9 seats, making it the third largest party in the Legislature.
