= Roy Cortina =

Argentine politician

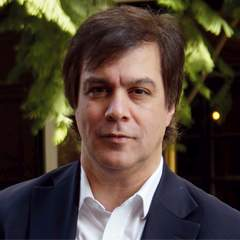

Legislator of the City of Buenos Aires
- Incumbent
- Assumed office 10 December 2015

National Deputy
- In office December 10, 2007 – December 10, 2015
- Constituency: City of Buenos Aires

Personal details
- Born: March 14, 1964 (age 62) New York City, U.S.
- Party: Socialist Party

Robert Vincent "Roy" Cortina (born March 14, 1964 in New York City) is an American-born Argentine politician, president of the Socialist Party in the City of Buenos Aires. Since December 2015 he has served as the 3rd Vice President of the Buenos Aires City Legislature, after serving as a national deputy from 2007 to 2015.

Roy Cortina is PRO's socialist ally and bets on its political future: "Horacio Rodriguez Larreta will know how to combine an inclusive and modernizing project in Argentina."

== Electoral history ==
Electoral history of Roy Cortina
Election	Office	List	#	District	Votes			Result	Ref.
Election	Office	List	#	District	Total	%	P.	Result	Ref.
2000	City Legislator	Alliance	23	City of Buenos Aires	652,182	36.76%	1st (Note: Presented on an electoral list. The data shown represents the share of the vote the entire party/alliance received in that constituency.)	Elected	
2003	City Legislator	Fuerza Porteña	5	City of Buenos Aires	240,270	13.84%	1st	Elected	
2007	National Deputy	Socialist Party	1	City of Buenos Aires	255,805	14.00%	2nd	Elected	
2011	National Deputy	Broad Progressive Front	2	City of Buenos Aires	316,476	16.83%	3rd	Elected	
2015	City Legislator	ECO	1	City of Buenos Aires	431,324	23.51%	2nd	Elected	
2019	City Legislator	Juntos por el Cambio	3	City of Buenos Aires	1,068,634	54.22%	1st	Elected	
