= Lucía Cámpora =

Argentine politician (born 1990)

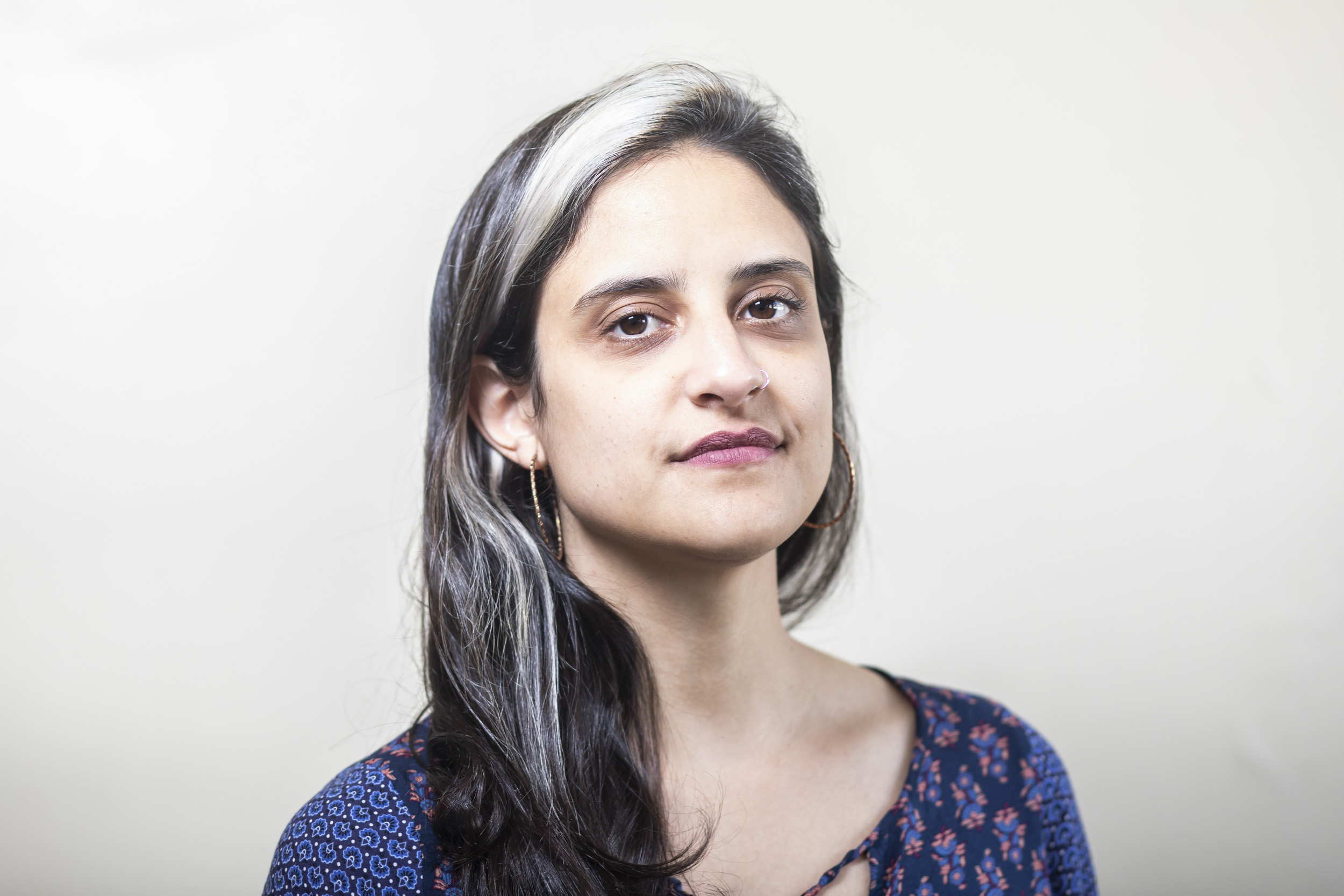
- Cámpora in 2019

National Deputy
- Incumbent
- Assumed office 10 December 2025
- Constituency: City of Buenos Aires

Personal details
- Born: 25 December 1990 (age 35)
- Party: Justicialist Party
- Relatives: Héctor José Cámpora (granduncle)

Lucía Cámpora (born 25 December 1990) is an Argentine politician who was elected member of the Chamber of Deputies in 2025. She is the grandniece of Héctor José Cámpora.
