= Eduardo Le Monnier =

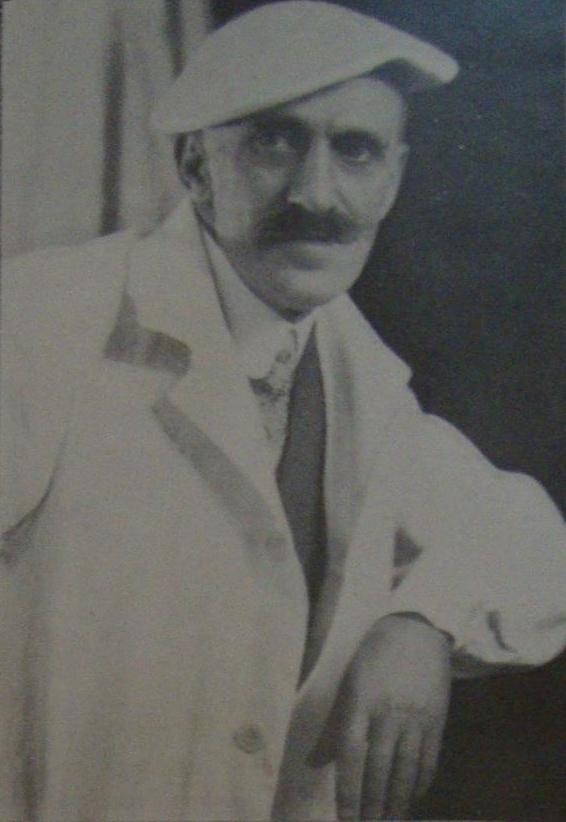
- Born: 30 September 1873; Paris
- Died: 14 February 1931 (aged 57); Buenos Aires
- Occupation: Architect
- Notable work: Banco Argentino Uruguayo; Buildings Bencich; Residence Fernández Anchorena; Yacht Club Argentino
- Honours: Municipal Prize for the Best Facade 1904

Eduardo Le Monnier (born Edouard Stanislas Louis Le Monnier; 30 September 1873 in Paris – 14 February 1931 in Buenos Aires) was a French architect recognized for his work in Brazil, Uruguay and mostly in Argentina.

== Education ==
He studied at the National School of Decorative Arts in Paris and moved to Brazil in 1894. There he worked on different projects, such as the General Carneiro station in Belo Horizonte and was a professor at the School of Fine Arts in Curitiba.

== Career ==
He arrived in Buenos Aires on 1 November 1896, there he developed most of its projects and concrete works. One of his first works there is the bakery La Burdalesa (Paraná nº 861/9, year 1898, already demolished). In 1901 he revalidated his diploma in the University of Buenos Aires and entered the Central Society of Architects (SCA). In 1902 he finished the Artistic Ironworks Motteau, with remarkable art nouveau style (Avenida Juan de Garay no. 1272, demolished) and later the headquarters of the society of mutual savings La Bola de Nievein Buenos Aires and in Rosario, province of Santa Fe (Cordoba and Laprida streets, year 1906).

He obtained the Municipal Prize for the Best Facade of 1903 for the residence he built for Bartolomé Ginocchio in Lima Street No. 1642. Two years later he received the third prize for the façade of Felix Egusquiza's residence on Libertad Street No. 1394 and in 1907 presided over the SCA. Thanks to these recognitions, different aristocratic families hire him to make his large residences in the Barrio Norte. The most important of these is the Fernández Anchorena Palace, now home to the Apostolic Nunciature, on Avenida Alvear 1637, built between 1907 and 1909. Another house, smaller but also lavish, was built on Avenida de los Incas 3260, where it is still standing.

In the second half of the 1920s, and until the crisis of 1929, there was a great rise of financial institutions in Argentina. All of them built large parent companies in downtown Buenos Aires, which ended up taking the role of financial city that conserves today. Le Monnier was in charge of the headquarters of the Uruguayan Argentine Bank (Avenida Roque Sáenz Peña nº 501, year 1928) and the neighboring buildings of the Bencich brothers, owners of a construction company (Edificio Bencich, Av. Roque Sáenz Peña 615 and Edificio Miguel Bencich , Av. Roque Sáenz Peña nº 614/6).

Eduardo Le Monnier also taught in the National Academy of Visual Arts and Architecture.

He died in Buenos Aires on 14 February 1931, at the age of 58.

== Major works ==
- Bakery "La Burdalesa". Paraná nº 861/9, Buenos Aires (year 1898 ). Demolished
- Church of the Sacred Heart of Jesus, in Hurlingham (year 1902).
- Church of Our Lady of the Carmen, in Ramos Mejía (year 1902).
- Church of the Sagrada Familia, in Haedo (year 1902).
- Cottage "Tocad", owned by Le Monnier in Bella Vista (ca. 1902). Currently part of the Bella Vista Racing Club.
- House of Bartolomé Ginocchio. Lima 1642, Buenos Aires (year 1903). Demolished
- Company "The Ball of Snow". Tte. General Juan D. Perón 301, Buenos Aires (year 1904). Demolished
- Residence of Felix Egusquiza. Libertad 1394, Buenos Aires (year 1905). Demolished
- Office building for "La Bola de Nieve". Peru 167, Buenos Aires (year 1905). Demolished
- Church of the Parish San Francisco Solano, in Bella Vista (year 1905).
- Guest house "La Oriental". Bartolomé Miter 1840, Buenos Aires (year 1906). Demolished
- Residence of Juan A. Fernández and Rosa de Anchorena . Av. Alvear 1637, Buenos Aires (year 1907). Current headquarters of the Apostolic Nunciature.
- Company "The Ball of Snow". Cordoba and Laprida, Rosario (year 1906).
- Jockey Club. Cordoba and Maipú, Rosario.
- Residence of Carolina Ortega de Benítez. Av. Callao 1807, Buenos Aires (year 1907). Demolished
- House of Arturo Z. Paz. Santa Fe 1652 to 1662, Buenos Aires (year 1908). Demolished
- Head office of the Yacht Club Argentino . Dársena Norte of Puerto Madero , Buenos Aires (year 1913).
- Banco Argentino Uruguayo . Av. Roque Sáenz Peña 525, Buenos Aires (year 1925).
- Apartment building for "Bencich Hermanos" . Av. Córdoba 801 (corner Esmeralda), Buenos Aires (year 1927).
- Miguel Bencich Building. Av. Roque Sáenz Peña 602, Buenos Aires (year 1927).
- Building Bencich. Av. Roque Sáenz Peña 615, Buenos Aires (year 1927).
- Apartment building for "Bencich Hermanos". Suipacha 1399 (corner Arroyo ), Buenos Aires (year 1927).
- Apartment building for "Bencich Hermanos". Tucumán 802 (corner Esmeralda), Buenos Aires (year 1929).
- Building of the Secretariat of Cabinet of Chief of Cabinet of Ministers "Building of the INAP". Ave. Roque Sáenz Peña 511 (year 1928)

== Gallery of works ==
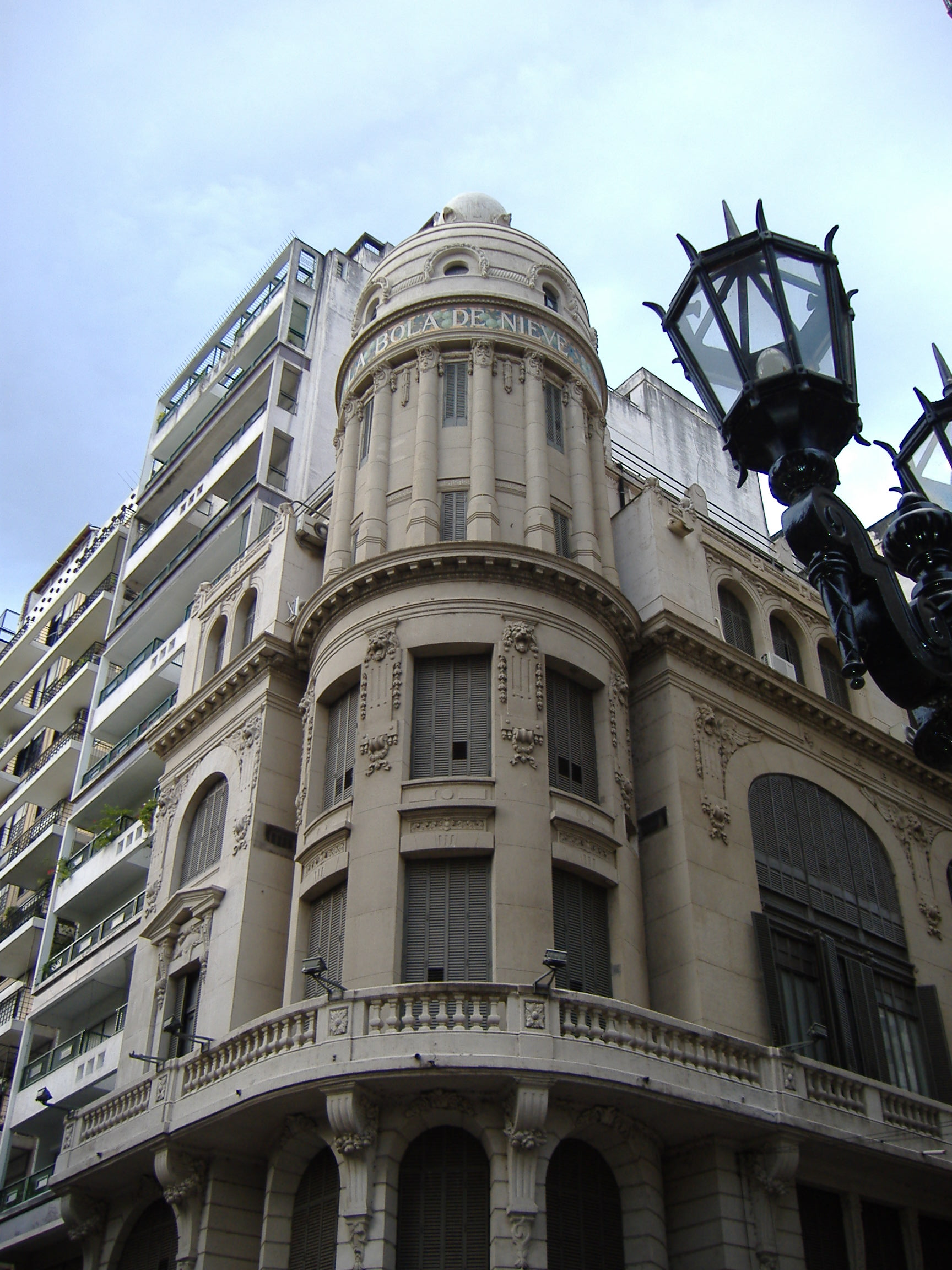
The Snowball

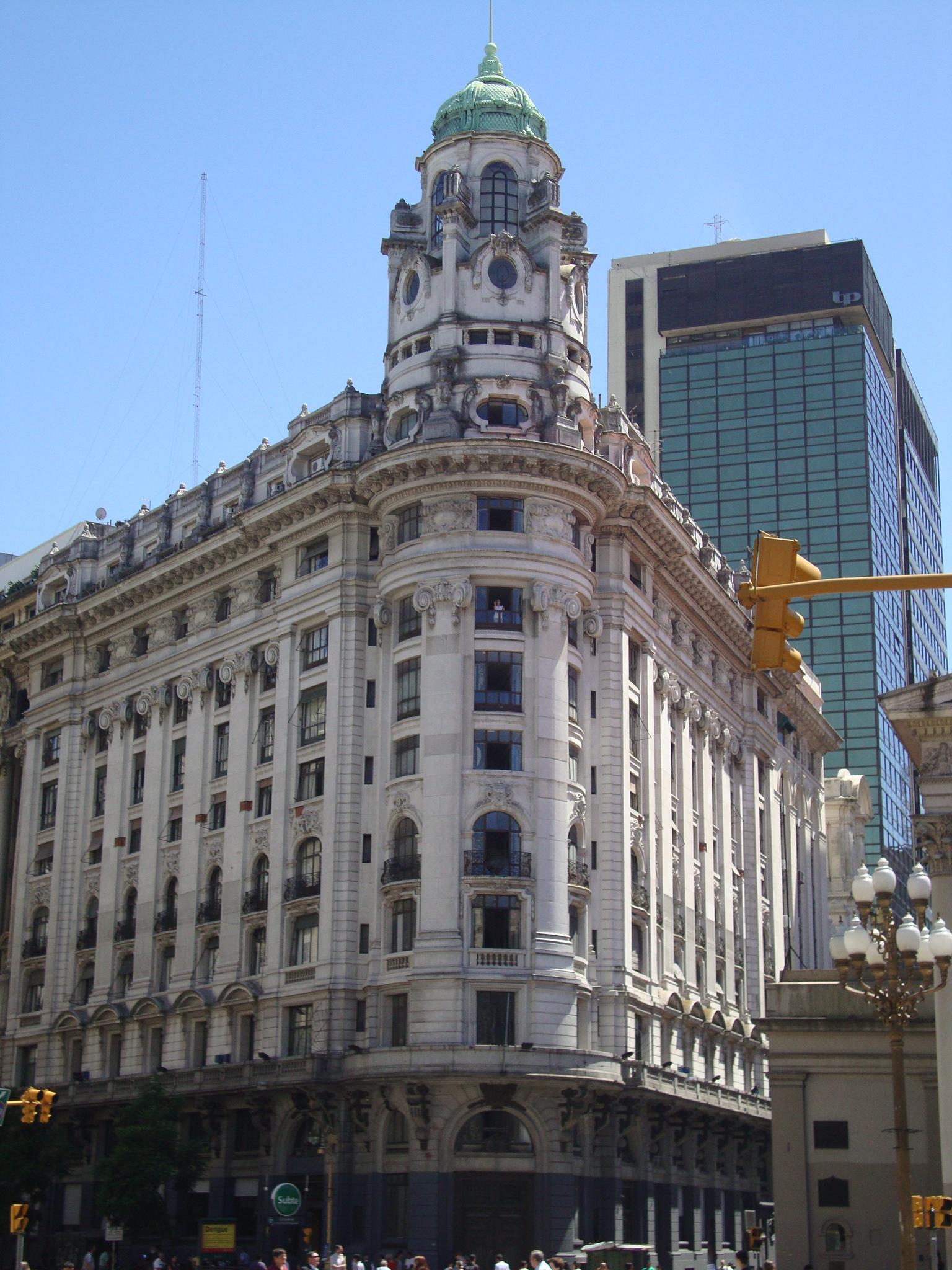
The Argentine Argentine Bank

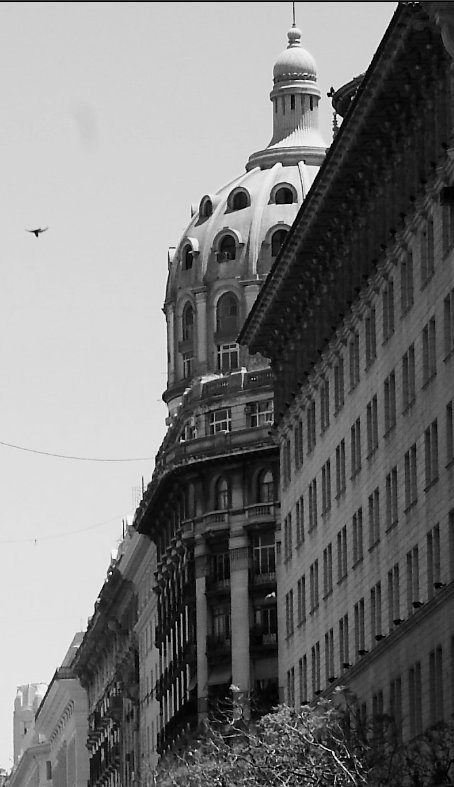
The Dome of the Bencich Building in Diagonal North

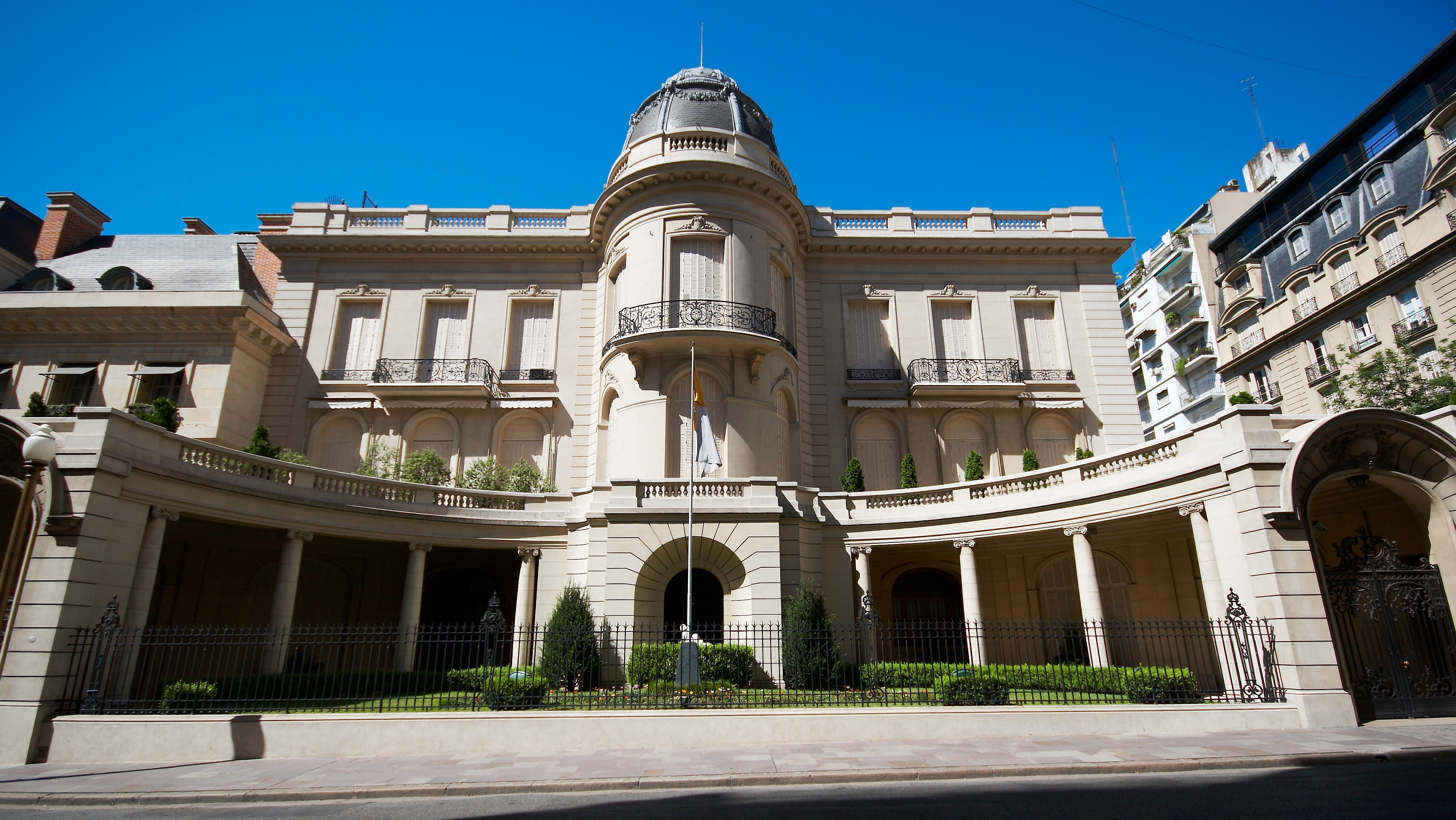
The Palacio Fernández Anchorena

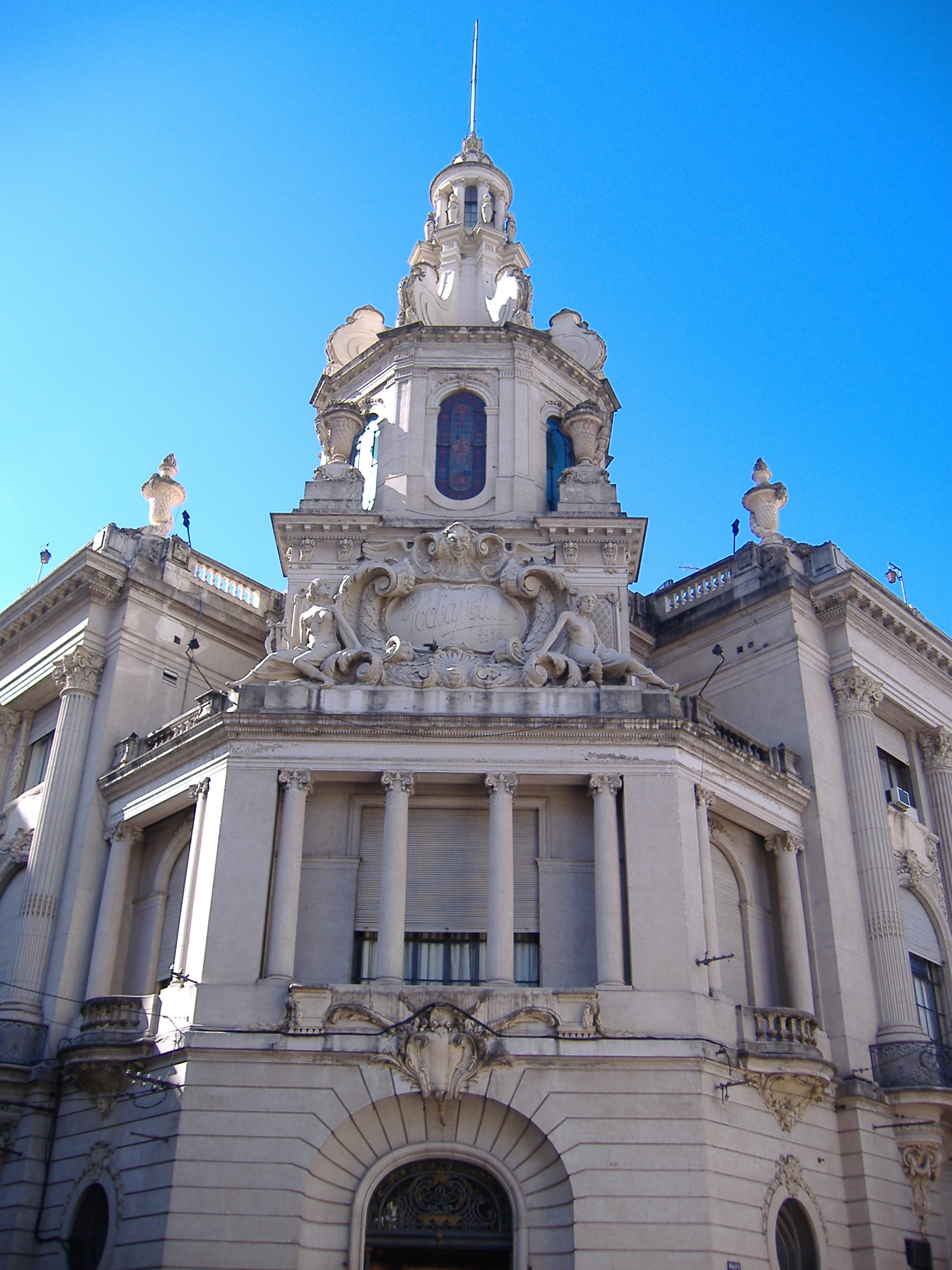
Dome of the Jockey Club of Rosario

== Sources ==
- Architect Eduardo Le Monnier, in "Revista de Arquitectura" nº 124. April 1931. SCA and CEA. Buenos Aires, Argentina.
