= Buenos Aires City Legislature Palace =

- Palacio de la Legislatura de la Ciudad de Buenos Aires
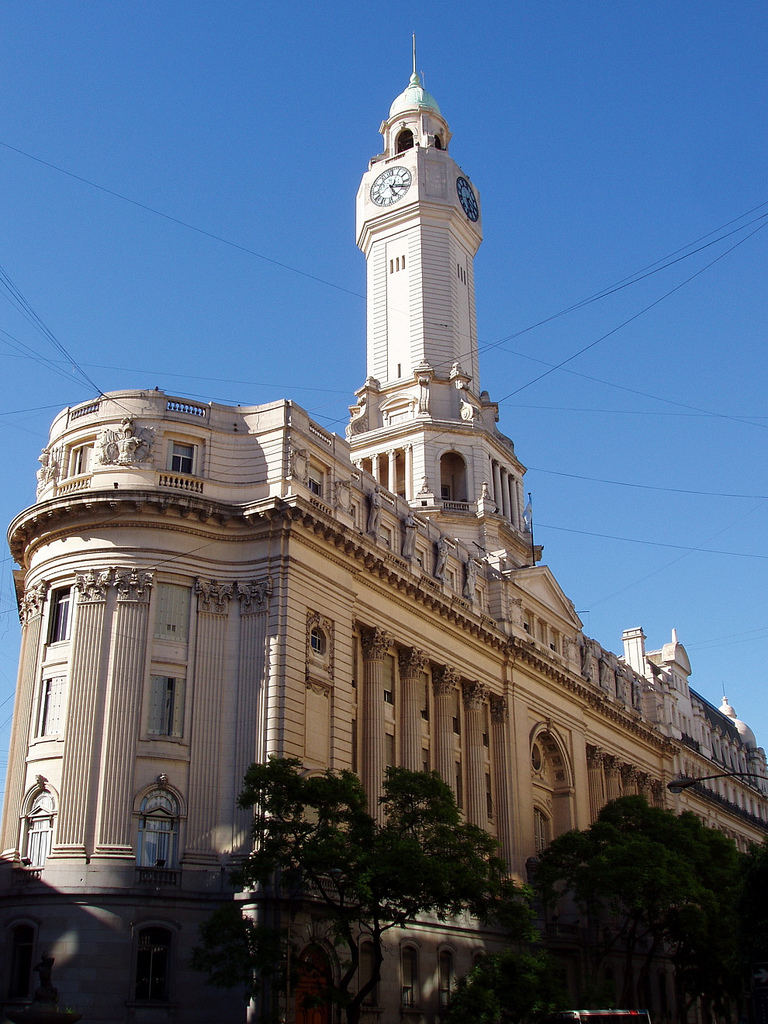
- View from the Plaza de Mayo

- Location within Buenos Aires

General information
- Type: Legislative palace
- Architectural style: Beaux-Arts
- Location: Av. Julio A. Roca 575 / Perú 130, Buenos Aires
- Coordinates: 34°36′34″S 58°22′28″W
- Completed: 1931; 95 years ago
- Owner: Buenos Aires City Legislature

Height
- Height: 97 m (318 ft)

Design and construction
- Architects: Héctor Ayerza; Eduardo Le Monnier
- Architecture firm: Luis Falcone

Website
- turismo.buenosaires.gob.ar/palacio-de-la-legislatura

National Historic Monument of Argentina

The Buenos Aires Legislature Palace (Spanish: Palacio de la Legislatura de la Ciudad de Buenos Aires) houses the Legislature of the City of Buenos Aires, Argentina. It is an architectural landmark in the city's Montserrat district, situated in a triangular block bounded by the streets Hipólito Yrigoyen Street, Presidente Julio A. Roca Avenue and Perú Street. Built of grey granite, it has a Neoclassical design. The building is open to the public on weekdays only. The building contains the Esteban Echeverría Library, Salón Rosado (also known as the "Eva Perón Hall"), and a carillon which, when it was installed in 1930, was the largest in South America.

== History ==
A lot southwest of the Plaza de Mayo was set aside for the building's construction. The building's design was awarded through a competition to local architect Héctor Ayerza. Approved and budgeted by the council in 1926, Ayerza's eclectic design drew heavily from French Neoclassical architecture. The foundation stone was laid under the First Congress of Municipalities of the Republic of Argentina, on November 18, 1926, by Marcelo Torcuato de Alvear. A commemorative plaque was affixed on the occasion. Louis Falcone was awarded the contract with a completion time of 5 years, and the work started on September 19, 1927; the contract included works of luxury fittings, lighting, a clock tower with five bells and a carillon with 30 bells. Problems with contractual interpretation were arbitrated by the engineer Sebastian Ghigliazza. The palace was inaugurated on October 3, 1931. The building has been home to other government agencies. Juan Perón, who established the Secretariat of Labor and Social Insurance, set aside a wing in the building for the purpose. Perón had the building declared a National Historic Monument in 1951.

== Architecture ==
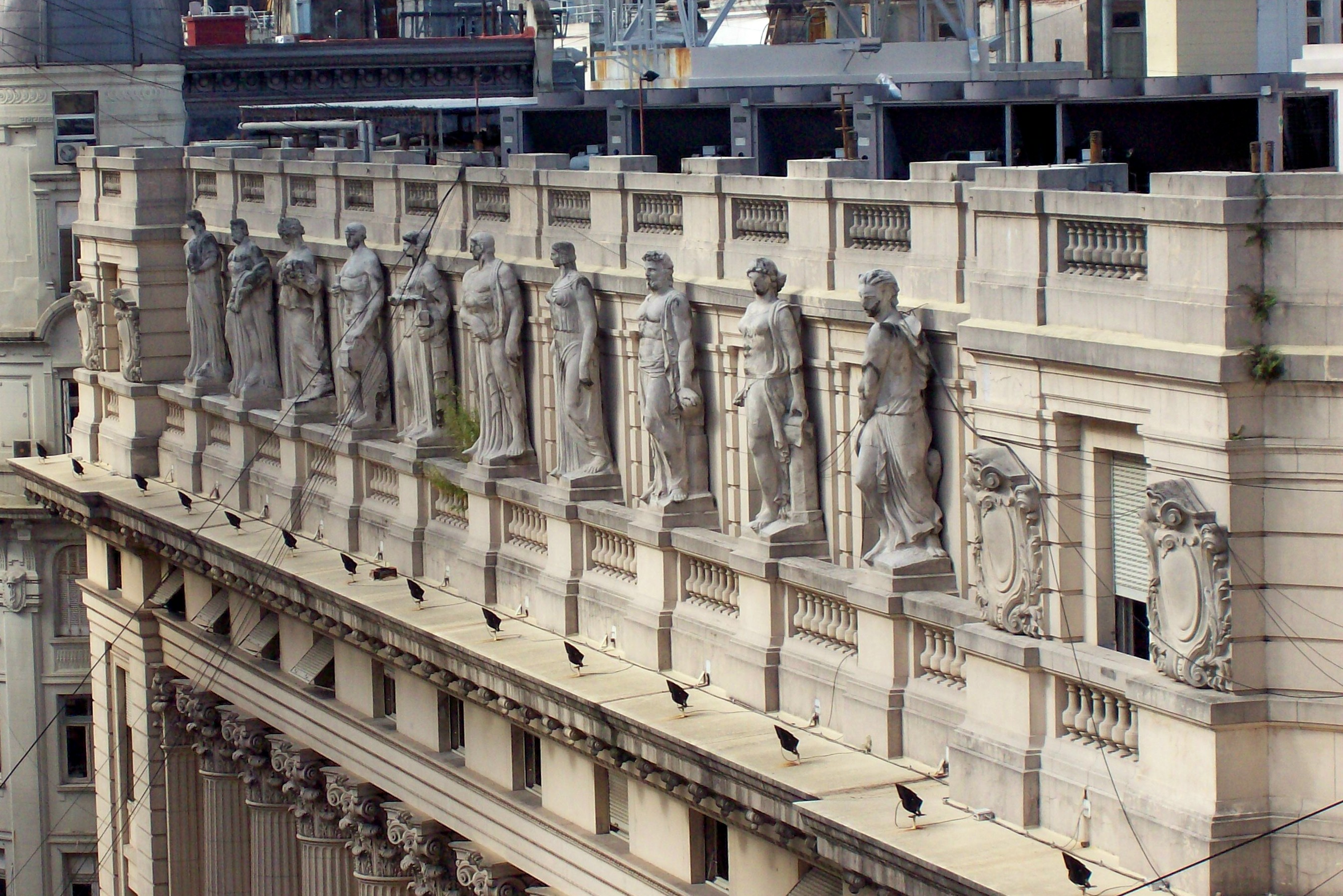
Exterior ledge facing Perú St.

Constructed in the Neoclassical style, the building has a basement, three storeys and a penthouse. It incorporates an older residence that faced the Plaza de Mayo but now fronts the Avenida Julio A. Roca. The main door, located at the corner of Julio A. Roca Avenue and Peru St., is of carved wood with a central brass knocker shaped as a lion's head. The front of the building has Corinthian style colonnades and balconies with balustrades. The former Municipal shield, made of bronze, adorns a large window. Architecturally, the building is perhaps best known for its 26 cornice caryatids (most by sculptor Troiano Troiani), the clock tower, and carillon (a musical instrument that is typically housed in the bell tower) of 30 bells. Aside from the legislative chambers themselves, the building's interior features a number of architecturally noteworthy salons and halls, as well as two libraries; the spacious halls are named the Golden Hall, the San Martin Hall, the Montevideo Hall, the Lost Steps Hall, the Eva Perón Lounge, the Dining Room of Honor, the Aldermen Hall and the Exhibition Hall. The Esteban Echeverría Library houses a unique collection of 2,000 books from the seventeenth to the nineteenth century. The other library, known as the Hemeroteca José Hernández, has numerous newspaper archives from 1870 covering topics of history, culture and general news. A staircase is situated opposite the main entrance to Avenida Julio A. Roca. It splits into two sections before reaching the main floor rotunda. Above it, a stained glass dome representing the sun can be opened manually or electronically to view the open sky.

== Library ==
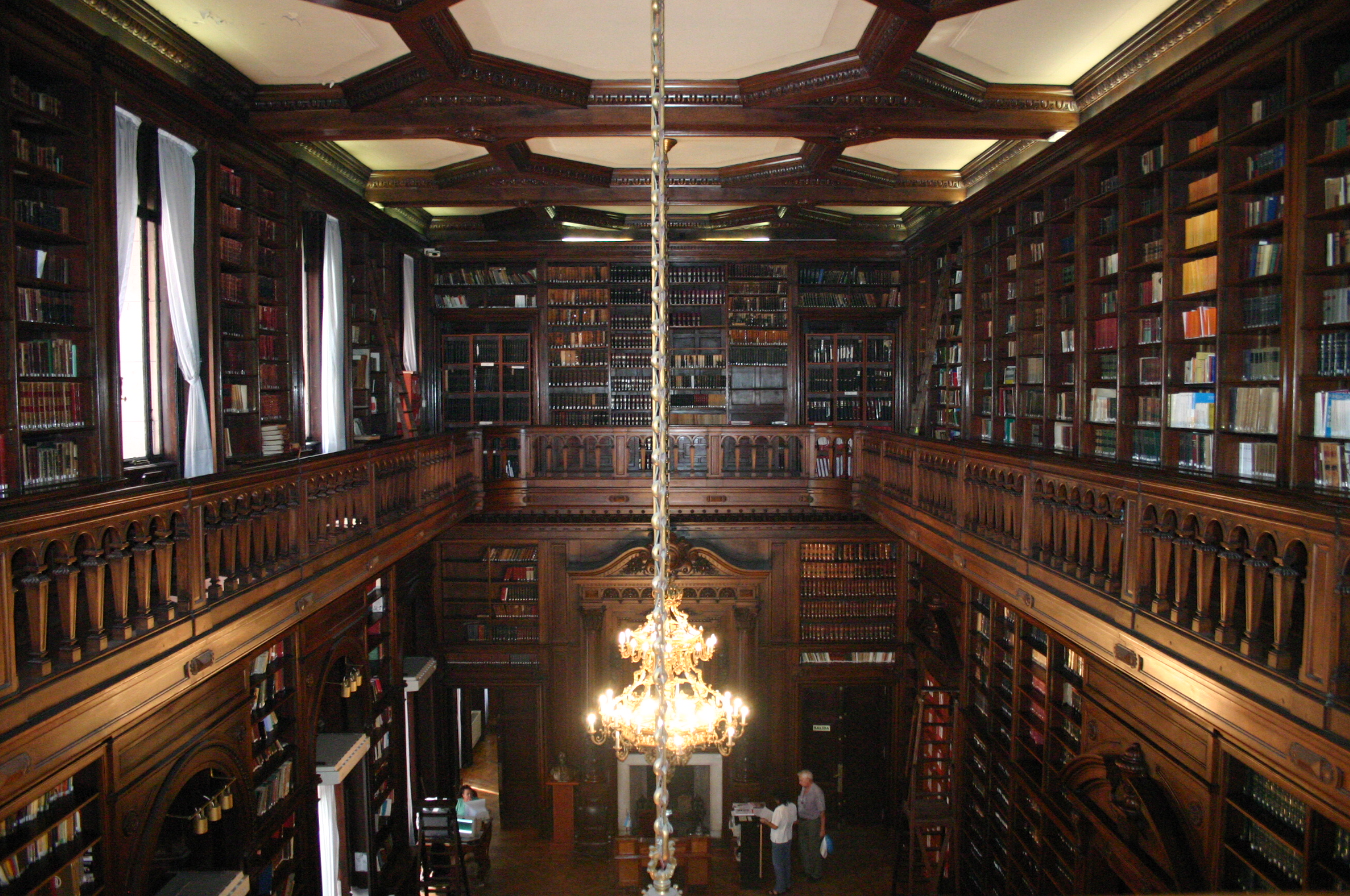
Esteban Echeverría Library

Previously known as the Centennial Library, the Esteban Echeverría library was designed in 1884 by the then Council president, Dr. Roberto Larroque, who ordered library materials from abroad. It also houses a collection of 30,000 texts on law and legislation. There are texts from Visigothic Spain, from the Viceroyalty of the Río de la Plata, and the colonial Buenos Aires Cabildo, and others. It includes the José Hernández Periodicals Library whose works have been microfilmed. Initially created to assist legislators and municipal officials, it was later opened to the general public. The library was renamed to honor the Argentine poet Esteban Echeverria who introduced literary romanticism to the city. The library is designed in an eclectic style with Neoclassical elements. It is clad in walnut; above the wrought iron fireplace is the city shield.

== Halls ==
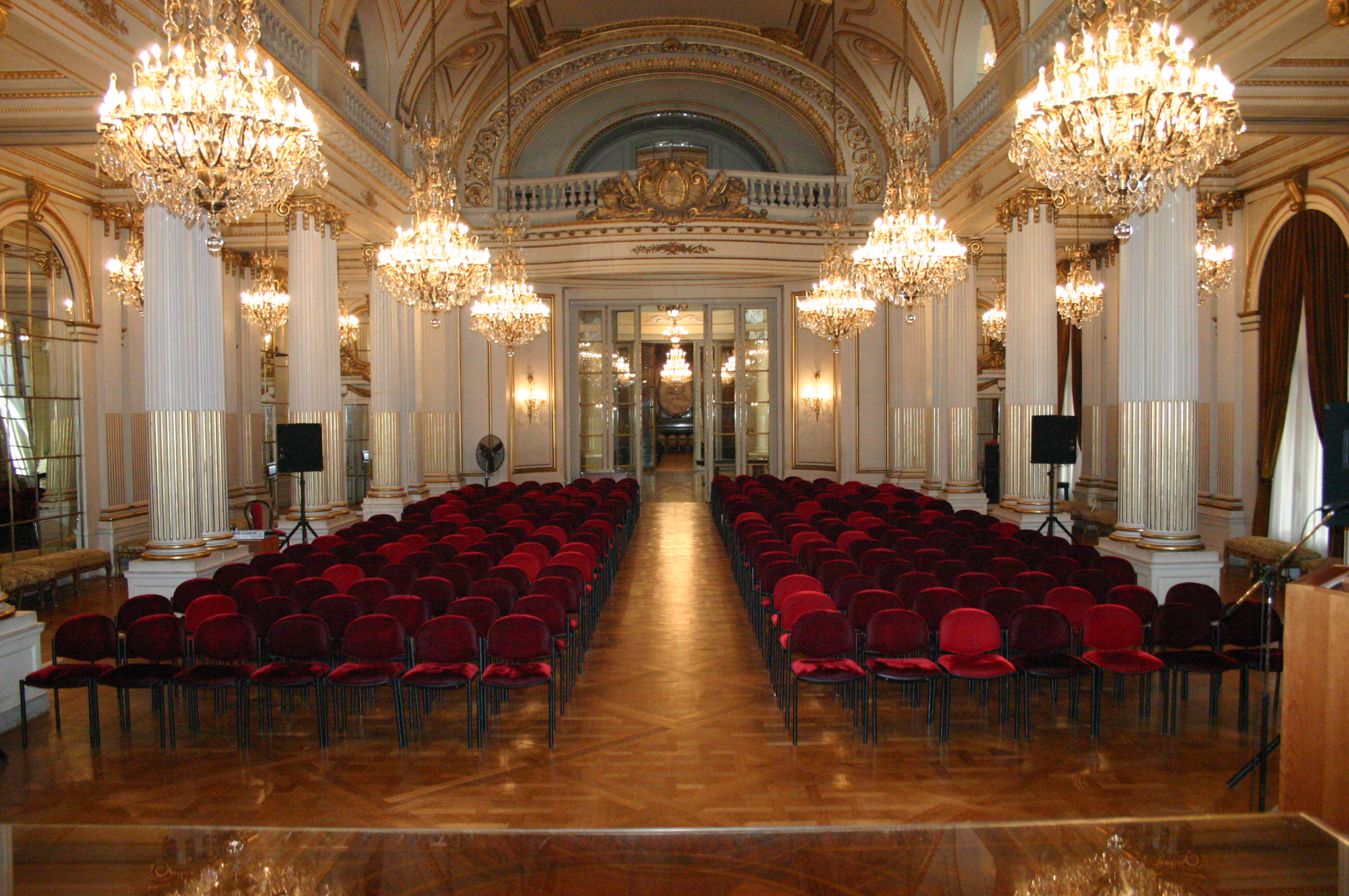
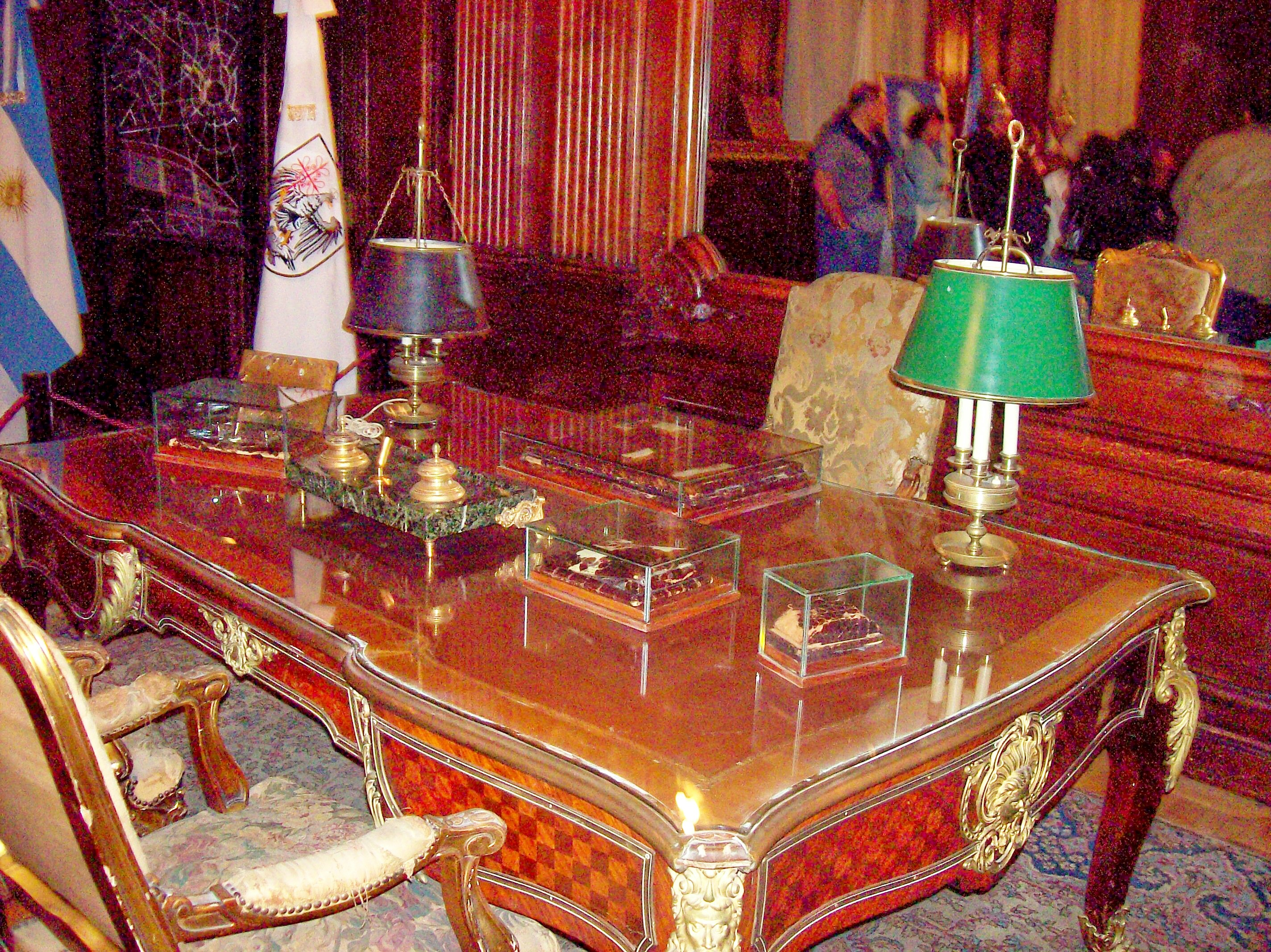
Left: Golden Hall; right: Salón Eva Perón.

The Golden Hall, reserved for ceremonies and other formal events, was inspired by the Hall of Mirrors in the Palace of Versailles, France. It is reached by climbing the Stairway of Honor. Columns with Ionic capitals surround the central area, supporting an arched gallery which serves as a balcony over the central area. At its base there is a shield of honor with the arms of the city. The hall is lit by six chandeliers, each with 45 lights, as well as 14 candelabras. The room is used for public hearings, receptions and events.

After women obtained voting rights in 1947 and female politicians began to enter the government's legislative system, First Lady Eva Perón established the palace's Salon Rosado ("pink room"; now known as the Salon Eva Perón) as a reserved area for government women to discuss issues in a place from which men were excluded. The room is now open to visitors. It is decorated with a memorial bust of Eva Perón and includes original fixtures. The edifice was declared a Historic Protection Area in 1977 and at the "comprehensive protection level" since 2000. The salon is a study which she used as head of the Eva Perón Foundation. A number of scenes for Alan Parker's 1996 film, Evita, were filmed here and in the legislative chambers. It is located between the offices of the President and the Vice President of the First Legislature. It houses some of the original furniture and personal objects such as a desk, chair, lamp, folders, ink and letter rack. Its walls are paneled in wood. There are also two Louis XIV cabinets by cabinetmaker Tarris, the municipal arms engraved on the doors. Two vases stand there, one in Baccarat crystal, the other bronze.

== Tower and carillon ==
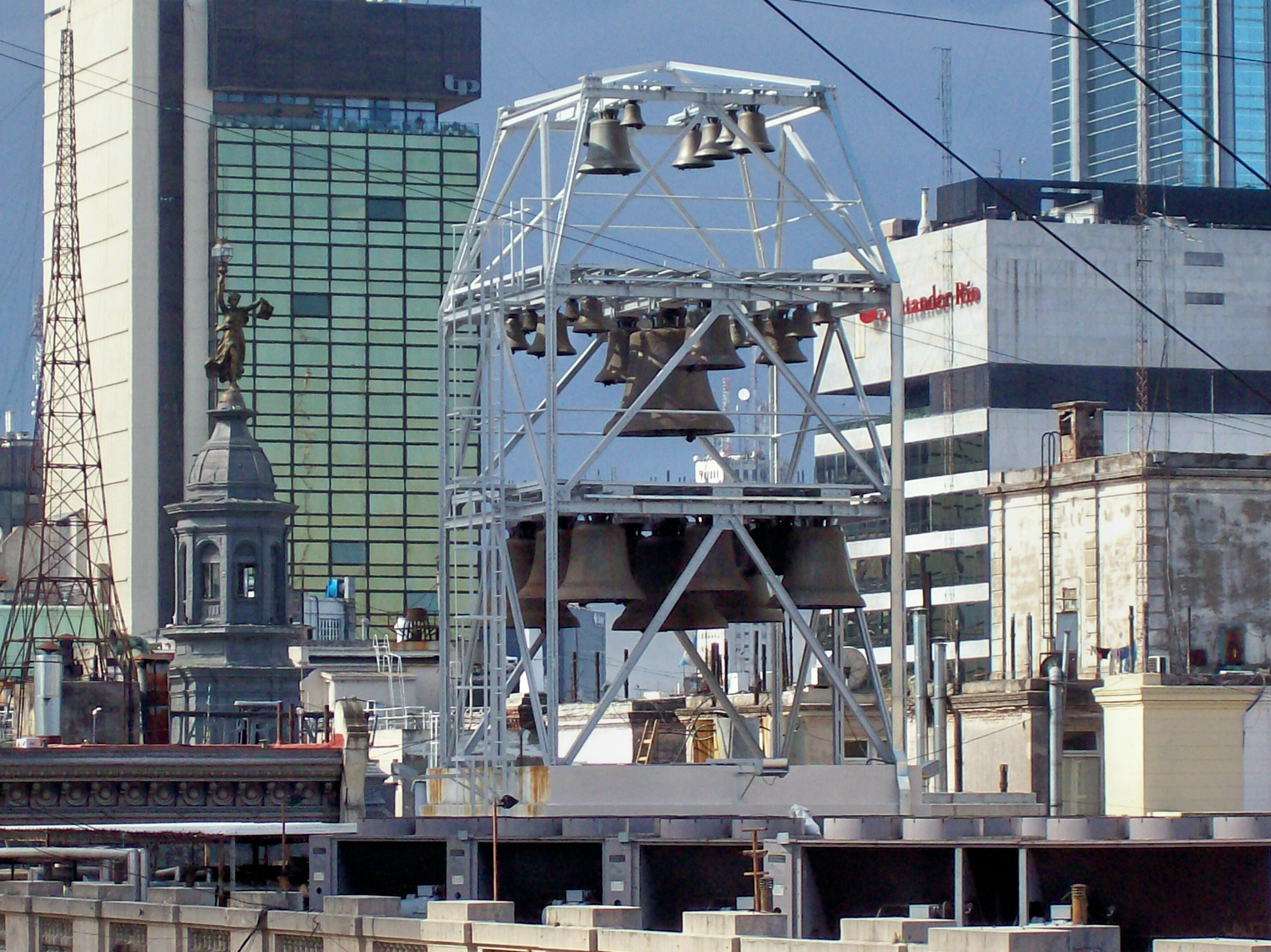
Carillon of the Palacio Legislativo de la Ciudad de Buenos Aires

The clock tower is 97 metres (318 ft) high. It houses a clock with five bells named Santa Maria, Pinta, La Niña, La Porteña and, the largest, at 1,800 kg, Argentina. The tower's four quadrants have a diameter measuring 4.5 metres (15 ft). The clock has a system that controls the running of 80 other clocks distributed in the rest of the building. The German-made carillon, made of bronze, has 30 bells that together weigh over 27 tons; most are more than 4 tons. Its architect was Hector Ayerza. It is situated on a semicircular pergola, surrounded by gargoyles and the silver pipes of a powerful air conditioner. The bells are suspended in an iron frame 11 metres (36 ft) in height and weigh 8 tons. When installed in 1930, it was the largest carillon in South America.

== See also ==
- Buenos Aires City Legislature
