= Buenos Aires City Legislature =

Legislative power of Buenos Aires

Coordinates: 34°36′34″S 58°22′28″W

Buenos Aires City Legislature Legislatura de la Ciudad de Buenos Aires
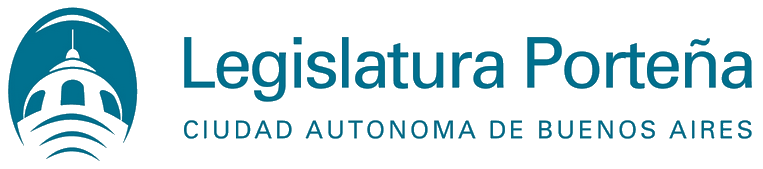

Type
- Type: Unicameral
- Term limits: 4 years

History
- Founded: 1996; 29 years ago

Leadership
- President: Clara Muzzio since 10 December 2023
- 1st Vice-President: Matías López, VxM since 10 December 2023
- 2nd Vice President: Matías Lammens, UP since 10 December 2023
- 3rd Vice President: Graciela Ocaña, CP since 10 December 2023

Structure
- Seats: 60 legislators
- Political groups: Government & allies (18): Vamos por más (15); Liberal Republican Front (2); United Republicans (1); Independents (20): La Libertad Avanza (9); UCR–Evolution (7); Public Trust (3); Socialist Party (1); Opposition (21): Union for the Homeland (18); PO–FIT-U (1); PTS–FIT-U (1); MST–FIT-U (1)

Elections
- Last election: 2025

Meeting place
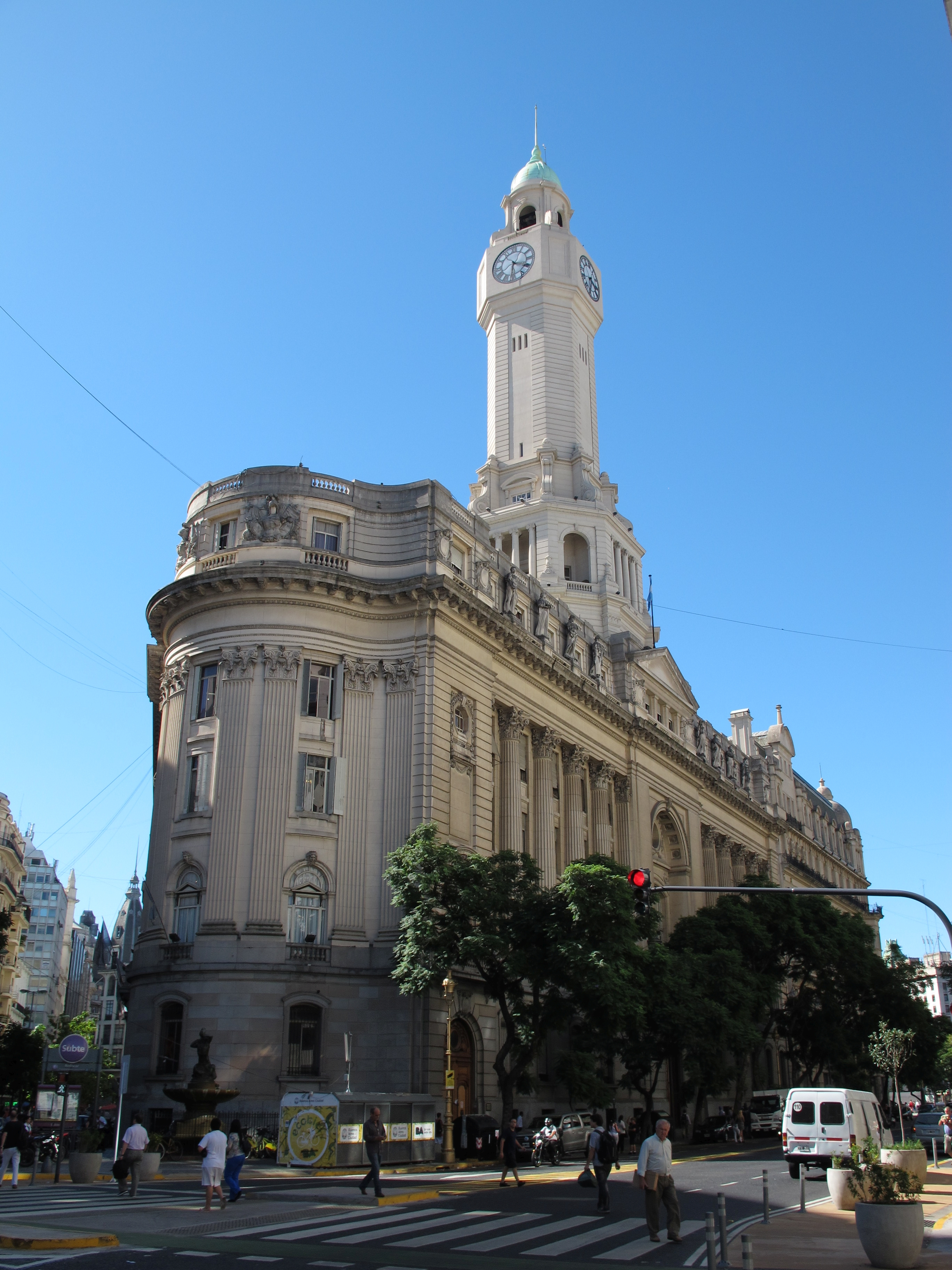
- Buenos Aires City Legislature Palace

Website
- legislatura.gov.ar

The Buenos Aires City Legislature (Spanish: Legislatura de la Ciudad Autónoma de Buenos Aires, commonly known as the Legislatura Porteña) is the legislative power of the government of the Autonomous City of Buenos Aires, Argentina. It is housed in the Legislature Palace (Spanish: Palacio de la Legislatura), an architectural landmark in the barrio of Montserrat.

== History ==
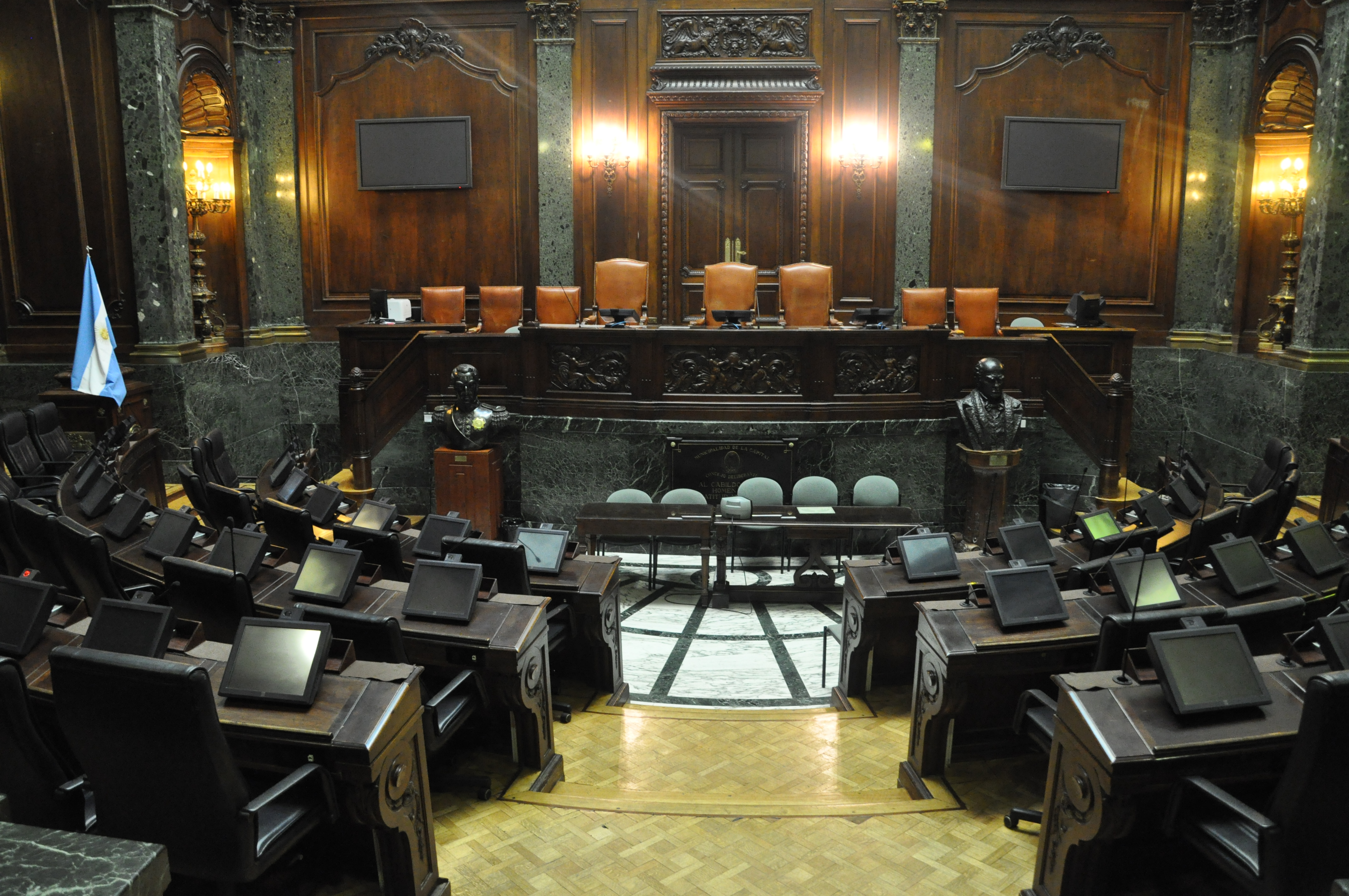
The legislative chamber.

The internecine warfare between those who favored a united Argentina with a strong central government (Unitarios) and Buenos Aires Province leaders who favored an independent nation of their own (Federales) dominated local political life in the decades following the Wars of Independence and led to the 1880 Federalization of Buenos Aires. Pursuant to this new policy, in 1882 President Julio Roca signed National Law 1260, which created the presidential prerogative of the appointment of the Mayor of Buenos Aires, as well as a city council by way of compromise towards the put-upon local gentry.

The newly formed city council (Consejo Deliberante) originally included 30 Concejales elected via male suffrage (though this excluded the city's immigrants, which made up a majority of voting-age males at least as late as 1914). The body first met during the tenure of Mayor Torcuato de Alvear, with whom a precedent for a productive relationship was established by cooperating on an unprecedented urban planning a renewal agenda. The council's resolution in 1921 for new grounds befitting a governing body of what had become one of the world's most prosperous cities was likewise approved by the Mayor at the time, José Luis Cantilo. A lot to the southwest of the Plaza de Mayo was set aside for the new building's construction, and was inaugurated on October 3, 1931.

The 1994 reform of the Argentine Constitution led to the rescission of the President's right to appoint the Mayor of Buenos Aires, and with the election of Fernando de la Rúa as the city's first directly elected mayor on June 30, 1996, an assembly was chosen for the purpose of drafting a new municipal constitution. Approved on October 1, the document created a city legislature in lieu of the city council, and increased its membership to 60 (elected for four year terms via party-list voting, as outlined in the D'Hondt method, with half the seats at stake every two years).

== Overview ==
The body is led by the mayor's lieutenant, the Vice Chief of Government (Vicejefe de Gobierno), who acts as President of the Legislature. They are assisted by three Vice-Presidents and Parliamentary, Administrative and Coordinating Secretaries. Gabriela Michetti of the center-right Republican Proposal (PRO) party became the first disabled individual to occupy the post of President of the Legislature in 2007; she left this post ahead of the June 2009 legislative elections, where she won a seat in the Argentine Chamber of Deputies. The post is currently occupied by Vice Chief of Government Clara Muzzio of PRO.

== Current composition ==
The following legislature was elected in the 2021 and 2023 legislative elections.

Party	Seats	Group President
Union for the Homeland	18	Juan Pablo Modarelli
We're Going for More	15	Darío Nieto
La Libertad Avanza	9	Ramiro Marra
UCR–Evolution	7	Manuela Thourte
Public Trust	3	Graciela Ocaña
Liberal Republican Front	2	Marina Kienast
United Republicans	1	Yamil Santoro
Socialist Party	1	Jessica Barreto
Workers' Party–FIT-U	1	Gabriel Solano
Socialist Workers' Party–FIT-U	1	Alejandrina Barry
Socialist Left–FIT-U	1	Mercedes Trimarchi
Source (last update: 20 January 2024)

=== List of legislators (2023–2025 term) ===
Legislator	Bloc	Term start	Term end
Alifraco Edgardo Nestor	Integration and Development Movement	2023	2027
Arenaza Juan Pablo	La Libertad Avanza	2021	2025
Barreto Jessica Soledad	Socialist Party	2021	2025
Barroetaveña Matías	Union for the Homeland	2023	2027
Bielli María Eugenia	Union for the Homeland	2023	2027
Casielles Eugenio	La Libertad Avanza	2023	2027
Crucitta Aldana Belén	UCR–Evolution	2023	2027
D'Atri Andrea	Socialist Workers' Party - FIT-U	2023	2027
Daer Maia	Union for the Homeland	2021	2025
Del Gaiso Juan Facundo	We're Going for More	2023	2027
Donati Pablo Alejandro	Liberal Republican Commitment	2023	2027
Ferrario Emmanuel	We're Going for More	2021	2025
Ferreño Claudio Américo	Union for the Homeland	2023	2027
Ferrero María Cecilia	We're Going for More	2021	2025
Fleitas Rebeca	La Libertad Avanza	2021	2025
Freire Victoria	Union for the Homeland	2023	2027
Glize Patricia Inés	We're Going for More	2023	2027
González Estevarena María Luisa	La Libertad Avanza	2021	2025
Grillo Alejandro Omar	Union for the Homeland	2023	2027
Iañez Berenice Lía	Union for the Homeland	2021	2025
Imas Silvia	La Libertad Avanza	2023	2027
Kienast Marina	La Libertad Avanza	2021	2025
La Blunda Andrés	Union for the Homeland	2023	2027
Lammens Núñez Matías Daniel	Union for the Homeland	2023	2027
Lapeña Lucío Damián	UCR–Evolution	2021	2025
López Matías Damián	We're Going for More	2023	2027
Loupias Francisco	UCR–Evolution	2021	2025
Marra Ramiro	La Libertad Avanza	2021	2025
Méndez María Sol	Public Trust	2021	2025
Michielotto Paola Vanesa	We're Going for More	2021	2025
Modarelli Juan Pablo	Union for the Homeland	2021	2025
Vacant			
Mollard María Fernanda	UCR–Evolution	2023	2027
Montenegro Lucía	La Libertad Avanza	2021	2025
Montenegro Victoria	Union for the Homeland	2021	2025
Nagata Sebastián	Public Trust	2023	2027
Neira Claudia	Union for the Homeland	2021	2025
Nieto Darío Hugo	We're Going for More	2023	2027
O'Dezaille Juan Pablo	Union for the Homeland	2022	2025
Ocaña Graciela	Public Trust	2023	2027
Parera Ignacio José	We're Going for More	2023	2027
Parry María Inés	UCR–Evolution	2021	2025
Peñafort Graciana	Union for the Homeland	2023	2027
Ramírez María del Pilar	La Libertad Avanza	2023	2027
Reta Jorge	La Libertad Avanza	2023	2025
Rey Sandra Mónica	Integration and Development Movement	2023	2027
Reyes Hernán Leandro	We're Going for More	2021	2025
Romero Claudio Ariel	We're Going for More	2021	2025
Saifert Leonardo	La Libertad Avanza	2021	2025
Santoro Yamil	United Republicans	2023	2025
Siciliano Sergio	We're Going for More	2023	2027
Solano Gabriel	Workers' Party - FIT-U	2021	2025
Suárez Guillermo	UCR–Evolution	2023	2027
Thourte Manuela	UCR–Evolution	2023	2027
Tiesso María Magdalena	Union for the Homeland	2021	2025
Trimarchi Mercedes	Socialist Left - FIT-U	2021	2025
Valdés Juan Manuel	Union for the Homeland	2021	2025
Velázquez Delfina	Union for the Homeland	2023	2027
Villafruela Gimena	We're Going for More	2023	2027
Vitali Amado Franco Antonio	Union for the Homeland	2021	2025
Source: legislatura.gov.ar (last update: 17 February 2025)

== Past legislatures ==
=== 2021–2023 term ===
Legislator	Bloc	Term start	Term end
Amor Alejandro	Frente de Todos	2021	2025
Andrade Javier	Frente de Todos	2019	2023
Arenaza Juan Pablo	Vamos Juntos	2021	2025
Barreto Jessica Soledad	Socialist Party	2021	2025
Barroetaveña Matías	Frente de Todos	2019	2023
Barry Alejandrina	Socialist Workers' Party - FIT-U	2021	2025
Bielli María	Frente de Todos	2019	2023
Bou Peréz Ana María	Vamos Juntos	2019	2023
Cámpora Lucía	Frente de Todos	2019	2023
Casielles Eugenio	Federal Consensus	2019	2023
Cortina Robert Vincent "Roy"	Socialist Party	2019	2023
Daer María Magdalena	Frente de Todos	2021	2025
de las Casas Mercedes	Vamos Juntos	2019	2023
del Gaiso Juan Facundo	Vamos Juntos	2019	2023
del Sol Daniel Eduardo	Vamos Juntos	2019	2023
Estebarena Carolina	Vamos Juntos	2019	2023
Fernández Ofelia	Frente de Todos	2019	2023
Ferrario Emmanuel	Vamos Juntos	2021	2025
Ferreño Claudio	Frente de Todos	2019	2023
Ferrero María Cecilia	Vamos Juntos	2021	2025
Fidel Natalia	Vamos Juntos	2019	2023
Fleitas Rebeca	La Libertad Avanza	2021	2025
García de García Vilas Diego	Vamos Juntos	2019	2023
García Moritán Roberto	United Republicans	2021	2025
Garrido Esteban	Vamos Juntos	2019	2023
González Estevarena María Luisa	Vamos Juntos	2021	2025
Guouman Marcelo Alejandro	UCR–Evolution	2019	2023
Iañez Berenice Lía	Frente de Todos	2021	2025
Kienast Marina	United Republicans	2021	2025
Lapeña Lucío Damián	UCR–Evolution	2021	2025
López Matías Damián	Vamos Juntos	2019	2023
Marra Ramiro	La Libertad Avanza	2021	2025
Martín Amanda	Socialist Workers' Party - FIT-U	2021 (Note: Since 3 March 2021. Replaced Alejandrina Barry following her resignation on 3 March 2021.)	2023
Méndez María Sol	Vamos Juntos	2021	2025
Michielotto Paola Vanesa	Vamos Juntos	2021	2025
Modarelli Juan Pablo	Frente de Todos	2021	2025
Mola Gustavo Alejandro	UCR–Evolution	2021	2025
Montenegro Lucía	La Libertad Avanza	2021	2025
Montenegro Victoria	Frente de Todos	2021	2025
Morresi Claudio Abel	Frente de Todos	2019	2023
Neira Claudia	Frente de Todos	2019	2023
Nieto Darío	Vamos Juntos	2021	2025
Ocampo Martín	UCR–Evolution	2019	2023
Parry María Inés	UCR–Evolution	2021	2025
Reyes Hernán Leandro	Vamos Juntos	2021	2025
Romano Lucía Noelía	Vamos Juntos	2019	2023
Romero Claudio Ariel	Vamos Juntos	2021	2025
Saifert Leonardo	La Libertad Avanza	2021	2025
Segura Rattagan Cecilia	Frente de Todos	2019	2023
Socías Manuel Salvador	Frente de Todos	2019	2023
Solano Gabriel	Workers' Party - FIT-U	2021	2025
Thourte Manuela	UCR–Evolution	2019	2023
Tiesso María Magdalena	Frente de Todos	2021	2025
Váldez Juan Manuel	Frente de Todos	2021	2025
Velasco Laura	Frente de Todos	2019	2023
Villafruela Gimena	Vamos Juntos	2019	2023
Vischi María Patricia	UCR–Evolution	2019	2023
Vitali Amado Franco Antonio	Frente de Todos	2021	2025
Weck Diego Ariel	UCR–Evolution	2019	2023
Zago Oscar	La Libertad Avanza	2021	2025
Source: legislatura.gov.ar (last update: 17 December 2021)

=== 2019–2021 term ===
Legislator	Party – Bloc	Term start	Term end
Abrevaya Sergio	GEN Party	2017	2021
Almeida Pablo Fernando	Socialist Left - FIT-U	2020 (Note: Since 10 December 2020. Replaced Gabriel Solano following his resignation on 10 December 2020.)	2021
Álvarez Palma Ariel	UCR–Evolution	2017	2021
Andrade Javier	Frente de Todos	2019	2023
Apreda Héctor Jorge	Vamos Juntos	2017	2021
Arce Hernán Ariel	Socialist Party	2017	2021
Barroetaveña Matías	Frente de Todos	2019	2023
Barry Alejandrina	Socialist Workers' Party - FIT-U	2019	2023
Bielli María	Frente de Todos	2019	2023
Blanchetiere Gastón	Vamos Juntos	2017	2021
Bou Pérez Ana María	Vamos Juntos	2019	2023
Bregman Myriam	Socialist Workers' Party - FIT-U	2017	2021
Cámpora Lucía	Frente de Todos	2019	2023
Casielles Eugenio	Federal Consensus	2019	2023
Cingolani Claudio Gabriel	Vamos Juntos	2017	2021
Cortina Robert Vincent "Roy"	Socialist Party	2019	2023
De Las Casas Mercedes	Vamos Juntos	2019	2023
Del Gaiso Juan Facundo	Vamos Juntos	2019	2023
Del Sol Daniel Eduardo	Vamos Juntos	2019	2023
Estebarena Carolina	Vamos Juntos	2019	2023
Fernández Ofelia	Frente de Todos	2019	2023
Ferreño Claudio Américo	Frente de Todos	2019	2023
Ferrero María Cecilia	Vamos Juntos	2017	2021
Fidel Natalia	Vamos Juntos	2019	2023
Forchieri Agustín	Vamos Juntos	2017	2021
García de Aurteneche Cristina	Vamos Juntos	2017	2021
García de García Vilas Diego Mariano	Vamos Juntos	2019	2023
Garrido Esteban	Vamos Juntos	2019	2023
González Velasco Laura	Frente de Todos	2019	2023
González Estevarena María Luisa	Vamos Juntos	2017	2021
González Heredia Guillermo	Vamos Juntos	2017	2021
Gorbea María Inés	UCR–Evolution	2017	2021
Guouman Marcelo Alejandro	UCR–Evolution	2019	2023
Halperin Leandro	UCR–Evolution	2018 (Note: Since 15 March 2018. Replaced Débora Pérez Volpin after her death on 6 February 2018.)	2021
López Matías Damían	Vamos Juntos	2019	2023
Martínez Marta Jacqueline	Self-determination and Freedom	2017	2021
Méndez María Sol	Vamos Juntos	2017	2021
Michielotto Paola Vanesa	Vamos Juntos	2017	2021
Montenegro Victoria	Frente de Todos	2017	2021
Morresi Claudio Alberto	Frente de Todos	2019	2023
Muiños María Rosa	Frente de Todos	2017	2021
Neira Claudia	Frente de Todos	2019	2023
Nosiglia Juan Francisco	UCR–Evolution	2017	2021
Ocampo Martín	UCR–Evolution	2019	2023
Pokoik García Lorena Iris	Frente de Todos	2017	2021
Reyes Hernán	Vamos Juntos	2017	2021
Roberto Santiago Luis	Frente de Todos	2017	2021
Roldán Méndez Victoria Inés	Vamos Juntos	2017	2021
Romano Lucía	Vamos Juntos	2019	2023
Romero Claudio Ariel	Vamos Juntos	2017	2021
Santoro Leandro	Frente de Todos	2017	2021
Segura Rattagan Cecilia	Frente de Todos	2019	2023
Socías Manuel Salvador	Frente de Todos	2019	2023
Solano Gabriel	Workers' Party - FIT-U	2017	2020 (Note: Resigned on 10 December 2020, replaced by Pablo Almeida.)
Straface Gonzalo Martín	Vamos Juntos	2018 (Note: Since 5 July 2018. Replaced Andy Freire following his resignation on 1 July 2018.)	2021
Suárez Guillermo Pablo	Vamos Juntos	2017	2021
Thourte Manuela	UCR–Evolution	2019	2023
Valdés Juan Manuel	Frente de Todos	2019 (Note: Since 9 December 2019. Replaced Mariano Recalde following his resignation on 4 December 2020.)	2021
Villafruela Gimena	Vamos Juntos	2019	2023
Vischi María Patricia	UCR–Evolution	2019	2023
Weck Diego	UCR–Evolution	2019	2023

== See also ==
- Chief of Government of Buenos Aires
- Buenos Aires City Legislature Palace
