= Rojas Partido =

Rojas Partido de San Francisco de Rojas
- Department
- Flag Coat of arms

- location of Rojas Partido in Buenos Aires Province
- Coordinates: 34°09′53″S 60°47′07″W
- Country: Argentina
- Established: December 20, 1777
- Founder: Diego Trillo
- Seat: Rojas

Government
  - Intendant: Román Bouvier (UCR)

Area
  - Total: 2,050 km^{2} (790 sq mi)

Population
  - Total: 22,842
  - Density: 11.1/km^{2} (28.9/sq mi)
- Demonym: rojense
- Postal Code: B2705
- IFAM: BUE105
- Area Code: 02475
- Patron saint: San Francisco de Asís
- Website: www.rojas.gov.ar

Rojas Partido is a partido in the north of Buenos Aires Province in Argentina.

The provincial subdivision has a population of about 23,000 inhabitants in an area of 2,050 km^{2} (790 sq mi), and its capital city is Rojas, which is around 220 km (140 mi) from Buenos Aires.

== Settlements ==
- Rojas
- Carabelas
- Rafael Obligado
- Roberto Cano
- Los Indios
- La Beba
- Guido Spano
- Hunter
- Sol de Mayo
