= Paso =

Paso or PASO may refer to:

== People ==
- Fernando del Paso (born 1935), Mexican novelist
- Juan José Paso, (1758–1833), Argentine politician

== Other uses ==
- Paso (float), an elaborate float made for religious processions
- Paso (theatre), a seventeenth-century Spanish one-act comic scene
- Peruvian Paso, a breed of light saddle horse
- Paso Fino, a naturally-gaited light horse breed
- Paso, a Spanish customary unit of length
- Paso, replaced by the longyi, traditional Burmese clothing
- "Paso (The Nini Anthem)", a 2012 song by Sak Noel
- Ducati Paso, a motorcycle
- Pacific Aviation Safety Office (PASO), an intergovernmental civil aviation authority
- Pan American Sports Organization (PASO), an international organization
- Pannonia Allstars Ska Orchestra (PASO), a Hungarian band
- Primary elections in Argentina (Primarias Abiertas Simultáneas y Obligatorias), a blanket primary system used in Argentina
- Seldovia Airport, Alaska, U.S., (ICAO airport code PASO)

== See also ==
- El Paso (disambiguation)
- Passo (disambiguation)
- Peso
