= Passo =

Passo may refer to:

== Places ==
- Passo, Missouri, United States
- Passô, Porto, Portugal

== Other uses ==
- Élida Passo (1867–1893), Argentine pharmacist
- Oscar Passo (born 1980), Colombian former footballer
- Toyota Passo, a Japanese subcompact car

== See also ==
- Passo, Italian for mountain pass and is a component in multiple place names (see)
- Passos (disambiguation)
