= Faculty of Dentistry, University of Buenos Aires =

Dental school in Argentina

Faculty of Dentistry
- Facultad de Odontología
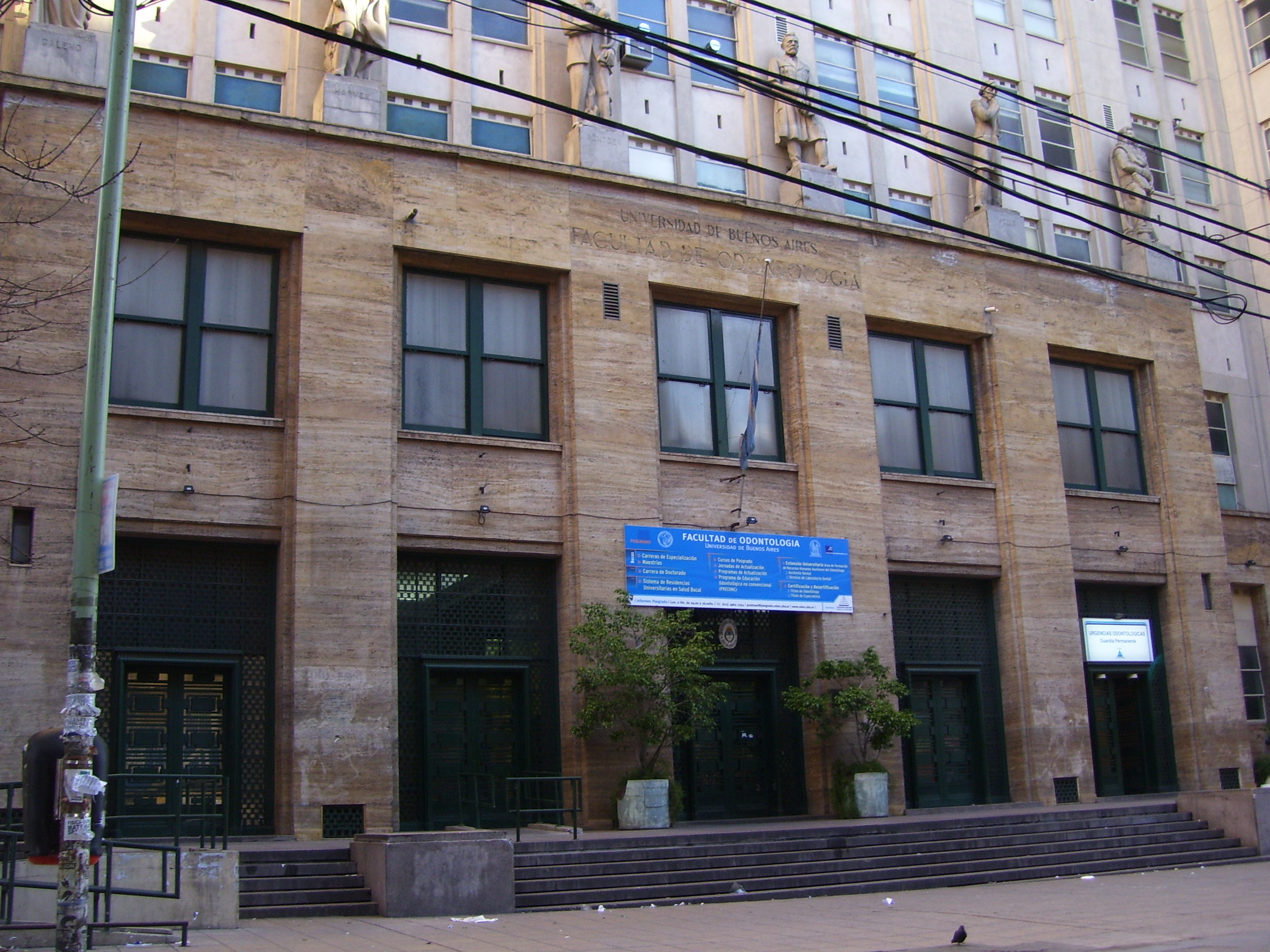
- Type: Faculty
- Established: 1947; 79 years ago
- Affiliation: University of Buenos Aires
- Dean: Pablo Alejandro Rodríguez
- Students: 2,046
- Address: Marcelo T. de Alvear 2142, Buenos Aires, Argentina; 34.3550°S 58.2353°W
- Website: odontologia.uba.ar

The Faculty of Dentistry (Spanish: Facultad de Odontología; FOUBA) is a faculty of the University of Buenos Aires (UBA), the largest university in Argentina.

As of 2011, FOUBA counted with 2,046 enrolled graduate students, making it the smallest faculty at UBA. The faculty offers only two graduate courses, on dentistry and a technician's degree on dental assistance, as well as a number of specializations, magister degrees and doctoral degrees. In addition, the faculty operates the university's Hospital Odontológico, a dentistry teaching hospital that offers diverse services free of charge.

The faculty has its seat on Marcelo T. de Alvear 2142, in the central Buenos Aires neighborhood of Recoleta. It is near other UBA faculties and facilities, such as the Faculty of Medicine, the Faculty of Pharmacy and Biochemistry, the Faculty of Economic Sciences, and the Hospital de Clínicas, among others.

== History ==
Dentistry at the University of Buenos Aires was historically taught at the Faculty of Medical Sciences. The first dentistry office at the university was established in 1891 under Dr. Mauricio González Catán. This office would later become the Escuela de Odontología, whose first head was Dr. Nicasio Etchepareborda.

It wasn't until 1947, at the behest of dentist and politician Ricardo Guardo that the Faculty of Dentistry was created, following the passing of a special law (Ley 13.031) in the National Congress of Argentina mandating the separation of the dentistry department of the Faculty of Medicine.

In 2017, the faculty inaugurated an imaging center for its Hospital Odontológico, aimed at serving the over 1000 patients who receive free treatment on a daily basis.

== Academics ==
The Faculty of Dentistry offers two graduate degrees: the dentistry degree and the dental assistance degree. In addition, the faculty offers a number of specialization degrees, as well as magister degrees, doctorates and post-doctoral degrees in diverse fields.

== Political and institutional life ==
Like the rest of the University of Buenos Aires's faculties, FOUBA operates under the principle of tripartite co-governance, wherein authorities are democratically elected and professors, students and graduates are represented in the faculty's governing bodies. The faculty is headed by a Dean (Spanish: decano or decana), who presides over the Directive Council (Consejo Directivo). The Directive Council is made up of eight representatives for the professors, four representatives of the student body, and four representatives of the faculty's graduates. Deans are elected by the Directive Council every four years, while elections to the council take place every two years.

Since 2022, the dean of the Faculty of Dentistry has been Dr. Pablo Alejandro Rodríguez, with Dr. Aldo Squassi as vice dean.
