= Enrique Chaneton =

Argentine ecologist (died 2019)

Enrique J. Chaneton (d. 2019) was an Argentinian ecologist. He completed his bachelor's degree in 1986. He then studied at the University of Buenos Aires, and completed a master's degree in 1995, working under Rolando León. He then moved to the University of London, and did a PhD with John Lawton, graduating in 1998. His research was on the structure and dynamics of plant communities in the pampas, or grasslands, of Argentina. Within this system, he studied biological disturbance, and specifically biological invasion. He served as an associate editor of the journal Biological Invasions. According to an obituary, he was a pioneer in the use of field experiments in his field, at a time when observational study was more common. Chaneton also conducted some research in Argentinian steppes, and in Patagonian forests. He taught graduate courses at the University of Buenos Aires, in the College of Agronomy, where he was an associate professor. He also chaired the graduate program of the College of Agronomy at the time of his death at the age of 56.
