= Eudeba =

Publishing arm of the University of Buenos Aires

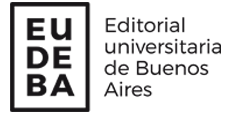
- Parent company: University of Buenos Aires
- Founded: 1958; 67 years ago
- Country of origin: Argentina
- Headquarters location: Avenida Rivadavia 1582, Buenos Aires
- Key people: Gonzalo Álvarez (President)
- Publication types: Academic journals, books
- Official website: eudeba.com.ar

The Editorial Universitaria de Buenos Aires, doing business as Eudeba, is the university press of the University of Buenos Aires, the largest university press in Argentina and one of the largest in Latin America.

It was founded in 1958, taking over from the university's Editorial Department, on initiative of UBA rector Risieri Frondizi. Initially a State-owned enterprise, it later became a mixed-economy enterprise, with 99% of its assets belonging to the Argentine government. Its first president was José Babini, and its first general manager was Boris Spivacow. Eudeba published 10 million titles during Spivacow's management, which lasted from the press's foundation to the 1966 coup d'état.

During the last military dictatorship in Argentina (1976–1983), the university's research production and curricula were subject to systemic censorship, and hundreds upon thousands of books were burned (including up to 90,000 books published by Eudeba). Many of them have since been re-published by the press following the return of democracy in 1983.
