= Faculty of Psychology, University of Buenos Aires =

Faculty of Psychology
- Facultad de Psicología
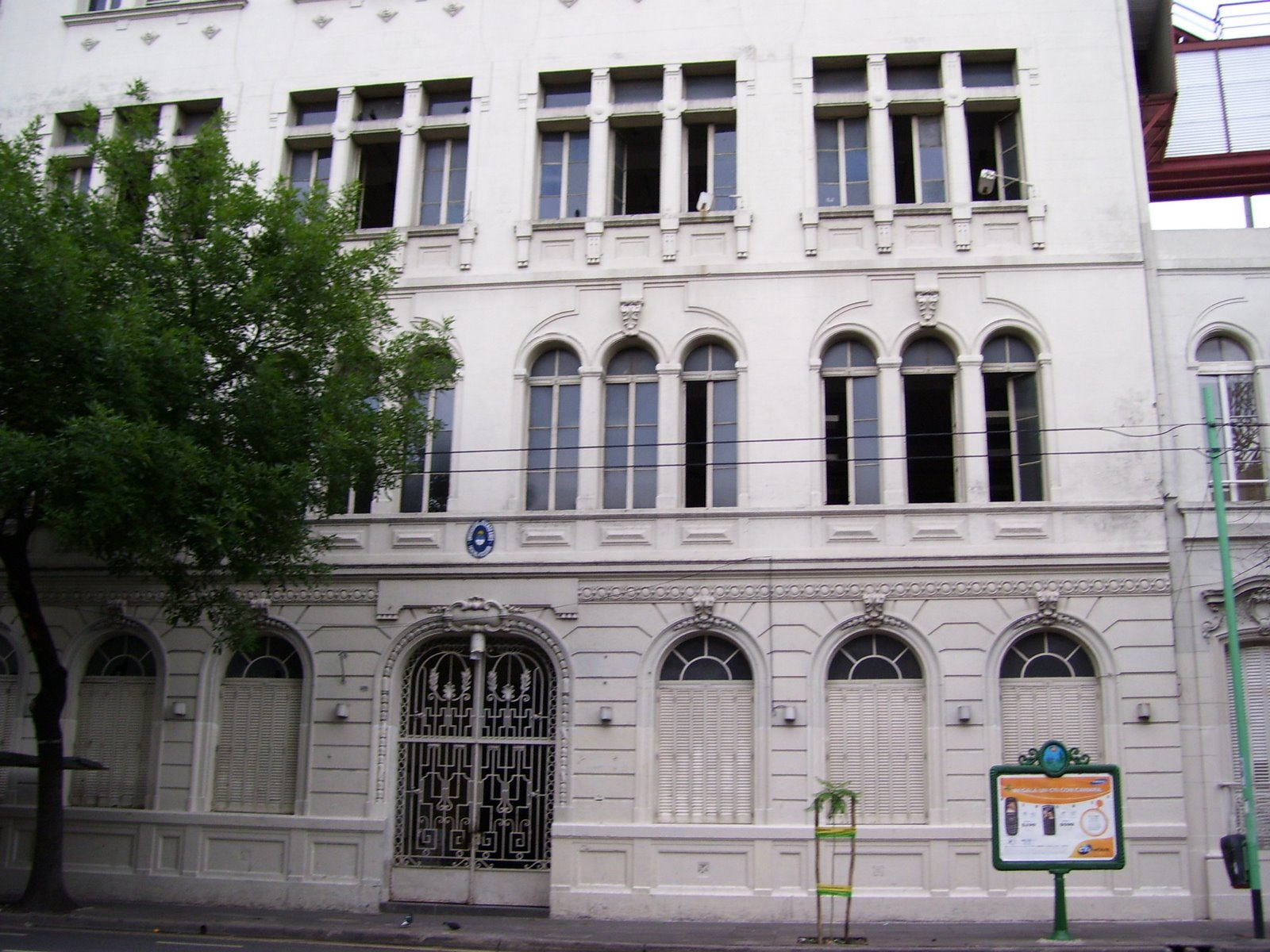
- Seat at Independencia Avenue, Balvanera
- Type: Faculty
- Established: 1985; 41 years ago
- Affiliations: University of Buenos Aires
- Dean: Jorge Antonio Biglieri
- Students: 16,162 (2011)
- Location: Av. Independencia 3065, Buenos Aires, Argentina; 34.3645°S 58.2445°W
- Website: psi.uba.ar
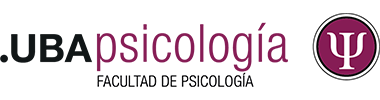

The Faculty of Psychology (Facultad de Psicología; PSI) is a faculty of the University of Buenos Aires (UBA), the largest university in Argentina. It offers graduate degrees on psychology, music therapy and vocational rehabilitation, as well as various post-graduate degrees on diverse fields.

It was founded in 1985 as a split from the Faculty of Philosophy and Letters. As of 2011, it counted with 16,162 graduate students, making it the sixth-largest constituent faculty at the university.

== History ==
The University of Buenos Aires began imparting courses on psychology in 1957, at the Faculty of Philosophy and Letters. Its first professors were professionals in the field of applied psychology and medical psychologists. The following year, in 1958, a new curriculum for the course was introduced and the Department of Psychology was created. By 1970, up to 5000 new students had enrolled at the Faculty of Philosophy and Letters, 90% of which were pursuing psychology and sociology degrees. The increase in interest for these careers led to UBA authorities discussing the possibility of creating new faculties dedicated to these disciplines.

In 1974, under the rectorship of right-wing professor Alberto Ottalagano, the Department of Psychology was removed from the Faculty of Philosophy and Letters and placed under direct tutelage of the UBA rectorship. In the following years, the military dictatorship that took over in the 1976 coup d'état would intervene the university and disencourage new applicants, leading the total number of new psychology students to plummet to 300. The dictatorship was wary of the purported influences of Marxism and Freudian psychoanalysis among psychology students, and disapproved of group practices and community work.

The return of democracy to Argentina in 1983 saw a renewed interest in the field of psychology, and by 1984, the university had 4,000 new students enrolled in the course. By 6,226 psychology students at the university. The rectorship had to employ classrooms at the Escuela Carlos Pellegrini and the ILSE for night shift classes. The 1986 class had 1,122 psychology graduates. The pronounced interest led the university to create the Faculty of Psychology in November 1985, the same year the "Law on the professional exercise of psychology", Ley N° 23.277, was sanctioned by the Argentine National Congress.

== Graduate and post-graduate programs ==
Graduate

- Licenciatura on Psychology
- Licenciatura on Music therapy
- Licenciatura on Vocational therapy
- Professorship on Psychology

Postgraduate

- Magister degree on Psychoanalysis
- Magister degree on Psychological diagnosis and evaluation
- Magister degree on Cognitive psychology
- Magister degree on Educational psychology

In addition, the faculty offers a number of specialization degrees, as well as doctorates and post-doctoral degrees.

== Research institutes and dependencies ==
The Faculty of Psychology's research center is the Instituto de Investigaciones en Psicología (IIP), created in 1992. Its first director was Dr. María Marta Casullo The institute has 1,166 researchers, both graduate, undergraduate and external. The faculty also publishes a number of periodical journals: Anuario de Investigaciones, Investigaciones en Psicología, and Revista Universitaria de Psicoanálisis among them.

== Political and institutional life ==
Like the rest of the University of Buenos Aires's faculties, the Faculty of Psychology operates under the principle of tripartite co-governance, wherein authorities are democratically elected and professors, students and graduates are represented in the faculty's governing bodies. The faculty is headed by a Dean (Spanish: decana or decano), who presides over the Directive Council (Consejo Directivo). The Directive Council is made up of eight representatives for the professors, four representatives of the student body, and four representatives of the faculty's graduates. Deans are elected by the Directive Council every four years, while elections to the council take place every two years.

Since 2018, the dean of the Faculty of Psychology has been Jorge Antonio Biglieri.
