= Faculty of Pharmacy and Biochemistry, University of Buenos Aires =

Faculty of Pharmacy and Biochemistry
- Facultad de Farmacia y Bioquímica
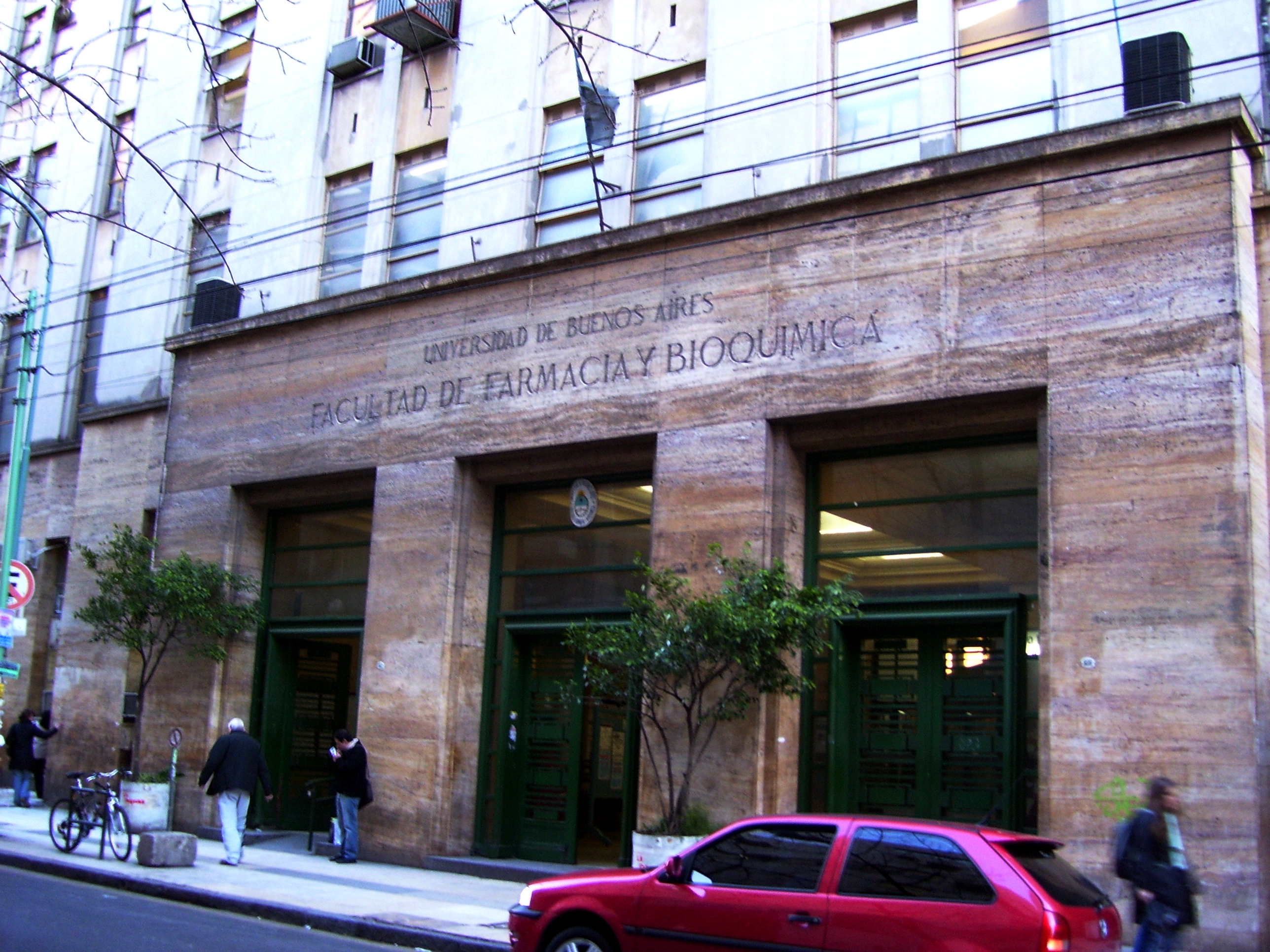
- Type: Faculty
- Established: 1957; 69 years ago
- Affiliation: University of Buenos Aires
- Dean: Pablo Andrés Evelson
- Students: 4,970
- Address: Junín 954, Buenos Aires, Argentina; 34.3552°S 58.2352°W
- Website: ffyb.uba.ar

The Faculty of Pharmacy and Biochemistry (Spanish: Facultad de Farmacia y Bioquímica; FFyB) is a faculty of the University of Buenos Aires (UBA), the largest university in Argentina. It was founded as an autonomous faculty in 1957, when it was split from the Faculty of Medical Sciences.

As of 2011, FFyB counted with 4,970 enrolled graduate students, making it the fourth-smallest faculty at UBA. The faculty offers graduate courses on biochemistry, pharmacy, and food science, as well as a number of undergraduate technician degrees, specializations, magister degrees and doctoral degrees.

The faculty has its seat on Junín 954, in the central Buenos Aires neighborhood of Recoleta. It is near other UBA faculties and facilities, such as the Faculty of Medicine, the Faculty of Dentistry, the Faculty of Economic Sciences, and the Hospital de Clínicas, among others.

== Degrees ==
Graduate

- Licenciatura on Biochemistry
- Licenciatura on Pharmacy
- Licenciatura on Food science and technology

Undergraduate

- University technical degree on Nuclear medicine
- University technical degree on Ophthalmic assistance and contact lenses
- University technical degree on Comprehensive vivarium management (alongside FVET)

In addition, the faculty offers a number of specialization degrees, as well as magister degrees, doctorates and post-doctoral degrees in diverse fields, such as clinical biochemistry, bacteriology, endocrinology, haematology, sterilization, industrial pharmacy, cosmetology, among others.

== Research institutes and dependencies ==
The Faculty of Pharmacy and Biochemistry counts with several research institutes. Three of them, the Instituto en Bacteriología y Virología Molecular (IBAVIM), the Instituto de Fisiopatología y Bioquímica Clínica (INFIBIOC), and the Instituto de Tecnología Farmacéutica y Biofarmacia (InTecFyB), are autonomous within the scope of FFyB. In addition, the faculty oversees a number of research institutes in strategic co-operation with the National Research Council; these are the Instituto de Química y Fisicoquímica Biológicas "Prof. Alejandro C. Paladini" (IQUIFIB), the Instituto de Química y Metabolismo del Fármaco (IQUIMEFA), the Instituto de Investigaciones Farmacológicas (ININFA), the Instituto de Inmunología, Genética y Metabolismo (INIGEM), the Instituto de Nanobiotecnología (NANOBIOTEC), Instituto de Estudios de la Inmunidad Humoral “Profesor Ricardo A. Margni” (IDEHU), and the Instituto de Bioquímica y Medicina Molecular, “Prof. Alberto Boveris” (IBIMOL).

== Political and institutional life ==
Like the rest of the University of Buenos Aires's faculties, FFyB operates under the principle of tripartite co-governance, wherein authorities are democratically elected and professors, students and graduates are represented in the faculty's governing bodies. The faculty is headed by a Dean (Spanish: decano or decana), who presides over the Directive Council (Consejo Directivo). The Directive Council is made up of eight representatives for the professors, four representatives of the student body, and four representatives of the faculty's graduates. Deans are elected by the Directive Council every four years, while elections to the council take place every two years.

Since 2022, the dean of the Faculty of Pharmacy and Biochemistry has been Dr. Pablo Evelson, with Dr. Laura Schreier as vice dean.
