= Passos =

Passos may refer to:

== People ==
- Ana Passos (born 1967), Portuguese politician and biologist
- Cristiano Ávalos dos Passos (born 1977), Brazilian footballer
- John Dos Passos (1896-1970), American novelist
- Márcio Henrique Maia Passos (born 1985), Brazilian footballer
- Marcio Emerson Passos (born 1978), Brazilian footballer
- Pedro Passos Coelho (born 1964), Portuguese Prime Minister
- Rosa Passos (born 1952), Brazilian singer
- Vítor Hugo Gomes Passos (born 1987), Portuguese footballer

== Places ==
=== Brazil ===
- Passos, Minas Gerais, a municipality in the State of Minas Gerais

Other variants

- Três Passos, a municipality in the State Rio Grande do Sul
- Ilha do Bom Jesus dos Passos, an island in the Baía de Todos os Santos, in the municipality of Salvador, State of Bahia

=== Portugal ===
- Passos (Cabeceiras de Basto), a civil parish in the municipality of Cabeceiras de Basto
- Passos (Fafe), a civil parish in the municipality of Fafe
- Passos (Mirandela), a civil parish in Mirandela Municipality

Other variants

- São Julião dos Passos, a civil parish in the municipality of Braga

== Other ==
- Bom Jesus dos Passos, an invocation of Jesus Christ
- Dos Passos Prize (also known as John dos Passos Prize), an annual award for the best currently under-recognized American writer in the middle of their career
- Visconde de Passos

== See also ==
- Passo (disambiguation)
