= Faculty of Veterinary Sciences, University of Buenos Aires =

Faculty of University of Buenos Aires in Argentina

Faculty of Veterinary Sciences
- Facultad de Ciencias Veterinarias
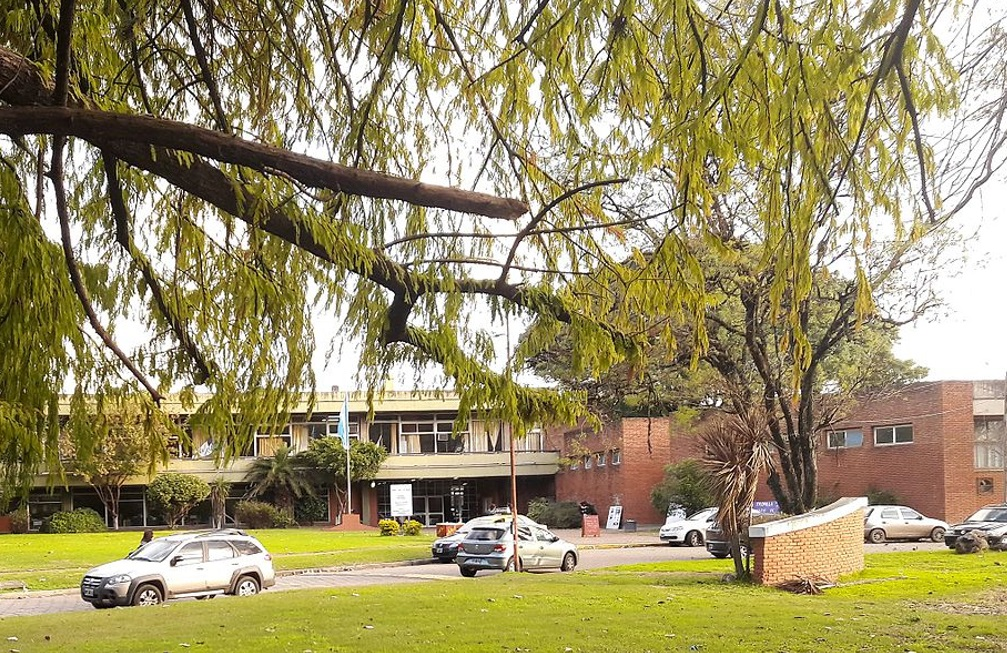
- Main FVET building
- Type: Faculty
- Established: 1972; 54 years ago
- Affiliation: University of Buenos Aires
- Dean: Alejo Pérez Carrera
- Students: 4,283
- Address: Chorroarín 280, Buenos Aires, Argentina; 34.3541°S 58.2841°W
- Website: fvet.uba.ar
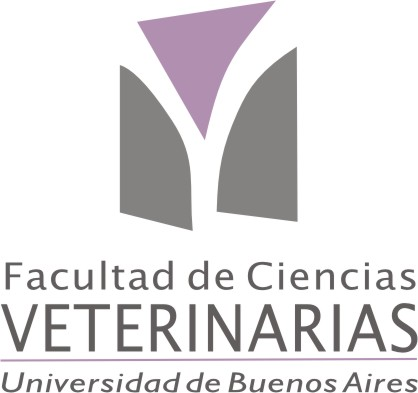

The Faculty of Veterinary Sciences (Spanish: Facultad de Ciencias Veterinarias; FVET), also simply known as Veterinaria, is a faculty of the University of Buenos Aires (UBA), the largest university in Argentina. It was founded as an autonomous faculty in 1972, when it was split from the Faculty of Agronomy and Veterinary Sciences, which was originally founded in 1904 as the Instituto Superior de Agronomía y Veterinaria.

Alongside the Faculty of Agronomy and a Ciclo Básico Común branch, FVET occupies the Agronomía campus, a 72-hectare rural enclave in the north-west of Buenos Aires City. Out of those 72 hectares, 48 correspond to FVET.

The faculty offers graduate courses on veterinary sciences, vivarium management and agrifood management. In addition to imparting classes, the faculty operates a teaching hospital, a high school, a library, a multi-media center and a cultural center, as well as numerous research institutes.

== History ==
The Faculty of Veterinary Sciences has its origins in the Instituto Superior de Agronomía y Veterinaria, founded on 19 August 1904 through a decree by agriculture minister Wenceslao Escalante, in the aftermath of a cattle Aphthous stomatitis outbreak in Southern Buenos Aires Province. The institute had its seat in Chacarita, then a mostly rural town in the outskirts of Buenos Aires with ample farmland cultivated by the Society of Jesus. Specialized veterinary institutes already existed in Argentina, such as the Escuela de Agronomía y Veterinaria y Haras, based in La Plata (which would later become the Faculty of Agronomy and Veterinary Sciences of the National University of La Plata).

The institute came to be known as the "Instituto de la Chacarita". In its early days, the institute's facilities were precarious and its remote location made it difficult for professionals to access it from the capital city. The institute also faced resistance from political opponents of President Julio Roca, who argued the public funds being channeled into the institute were being misplaced – veterinarians were not then seen as true professionals at the time.

The institute's first rector was the chemist and medical doctor Pedro N. Arata, a member of the elite Generation of '80. Most of the institute's first professors were from Europe, such as Godofredo Cassai, Angel Baldoni and Salvatore Baldasarre (from Italy), Kurt Wolffhugel (from Germany) and Julio Lesage (from France). The only Argentine veteriarian to form part of the institute's early faculty was Dr. Joaquín Zabala. The institute's journal, Anales del Instituto Superior de Agronomía y Veterinaria de la Nación, was founded in 1906. It also had its own students' union, the first president of which was José Morales Bustamante.

The first class to graduate the institute, in 1908, counted with over 30 veterinarians. The following year, on 10 May 1909, the national government incorporated the institute into the University of Buenos Aires, shifting its hierarchy from a government institute operated by the Ministry of Agriculture into an autonomous faculty within the university. Dr. Arata remained as head as dean of the faculty. The first dean to be a graduate from the faculty was Daniel Inchausti, who served in the position from 1924 to 1927.

Starting in 1913, most first year students at the faculty sought agronomy degrees, relegating the veterinary sciences degrees and leading to budget cuts in the area. By 1972, deeming the situation critical, the Veterinary Sciences department staged protests across the city, suspended classes, and professors staged hunger strikes, demanding the separation of the two disciplines into two different faculties (which would allow them to manage budgets autonomously). The country was at the time under the dictatorship of Alejandro Lanusse, and the government sought to control and placate these protests. However, due to public support, on 23 October 1972 President Lanusse issued a decree establishing the Faculty of Veterinary Sciences as the tenth faculty of the University of Buenos Aires. Its first dean was Dr. Guillermo C. Lucas.

== Degrees ==
The Faculty of Veterinary Sciences presently offers three graduate degrees:

- Veterinary degree
- University Technical degree on Comprehensive Vivarium Management (alongside the Faculty of Pharmacy and Biochemistry)
- Licenciatura on Agrifood Management (alongside the Faculty of Agronomy)

In addition, the faculty offers a number of specialization degrees, as well as magister degrees, doctorates and post-doctoral degrees in diverse fields, such as animal and public health, water management, animal reproduction, bromatology, biotechnology, equestrianism-related health studies, animal production, veterinary cardiology, and disability management.

== Research institutes and dependencies ==
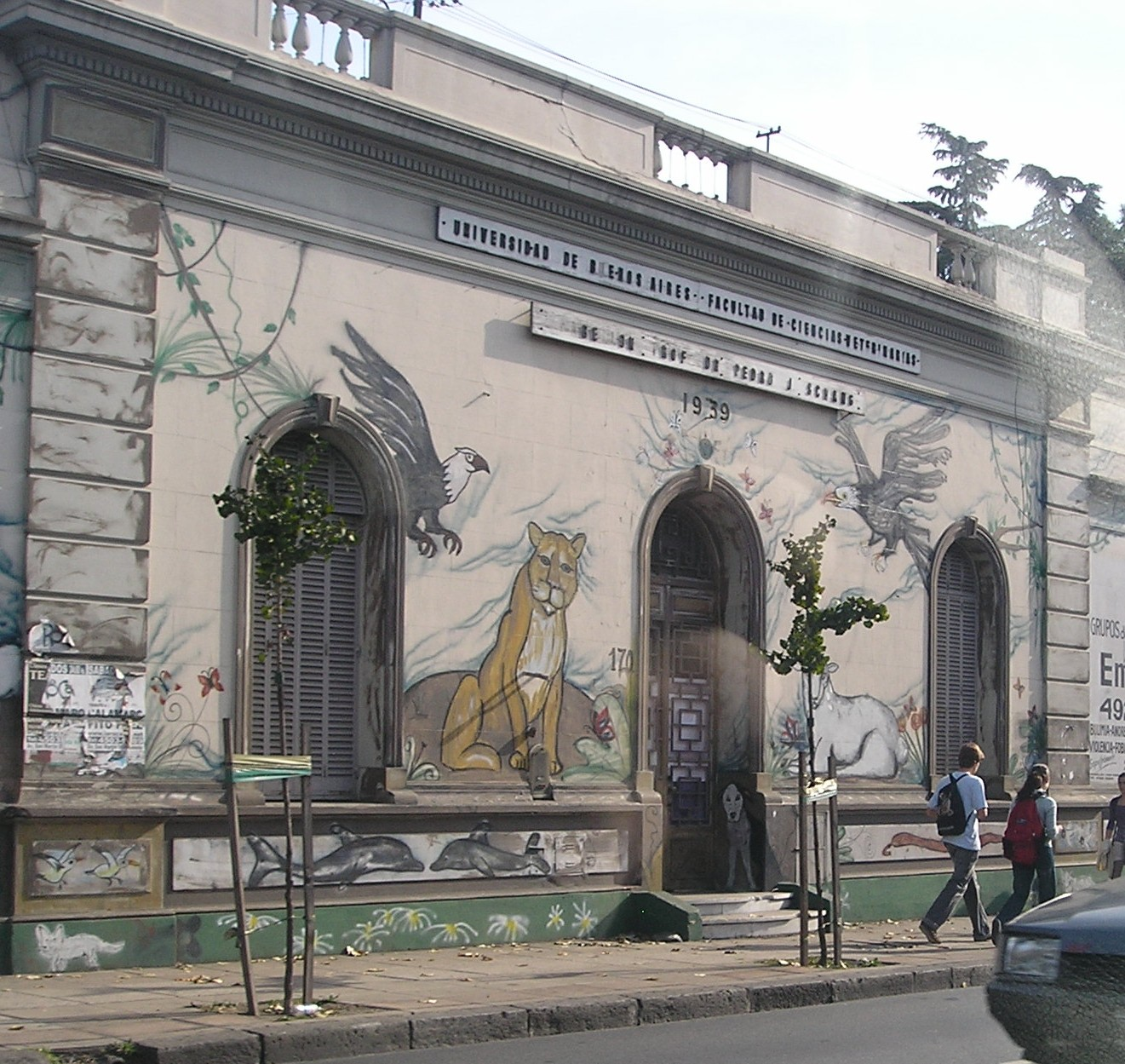
Pedro J. Schang building, seat of the faculty's immunology office.

The Faculty of Veterinary Sciences has six research institutes: the Instituto de Investigación y Tecnología en Reproducción Animal ("Institute of Research and Technology on Animal Reproduction", INITRA), the Instituto de Investigaciones en Producción Animal ("Institute of Animal Production Research", INPA – a joint institute alongside CONICET), the Centro de Estudios Transdisciplinarios del Agua ("Center for Transdisciplinary Water Studies", CETA), the Centro de Estudios Transdisciplinarios de Epidemiología ("Center for Transdisciplinary Epidemiology Studies", CETE), the Instituto de Fisiopatología Cardiovascular ("Institute of Cardiovascular Physiotherapy, INFICA – a joint institute alongside the Faculty of Medical Sciences), and the Instituto de Investigaciones Clínicas Veterinarias ("Institute of Clinical Veterinary Research", INCLIVET). Scientific research in the faculty is often published through its periodic journal, InVet, which is published since 1999.

To ensure the ethical and humane treatment of animals in all of the faculty's educational activities and research, the faculty has a specialized committee, the Comité Institucional de Cuidado y Uso de Animales de Experimentación (CICUAL), created in 2003. In addition, the faculty operates a number of vivariums.

FVET also oversees the Escuela Agropecuaria y Agroalimentaria, one of UBA's five high schools and the only one specialized in agricultural education. The Escuela Agropecuaria has its seat in the Agronomía campus, adjacent to FVET and the Faculty of Agronomy. As other technical schools in Buenos Aires, education at the Escuela Agropecuaria constitutes six years, made up of a two-year basic cycle and then a four-year technical education cycle. The school was opened in 2009.

== Political and institutional life ==
Like the rest of the University of Buenos Aires's faculties, FVET operates under the principle of tripartite co-governance, wherein authorities are democratically elected and professors, students and graduates are represented in the faculty's governing bodies. The faculty is headed by a Dean (Spanish: decano or decana), who presides over the Directive Council (Consejo Directivo). The Directive Council is made up of eight representatives for the professors, four representatives of the student body, and four representatives of the faculty's graduates. Deans are elected by the Directive Council every four years, while elections to the council take place every two years.

Since 2018, the dean of the Faculty of Veterinary Sciences has been Alejo Pérez Carrera.

== Notable people ==
- Juan Carlos Stockert, Institute of Research and Technology in Animal Reproduction, Faculty of Veterinary Sciences

== Gallery ==
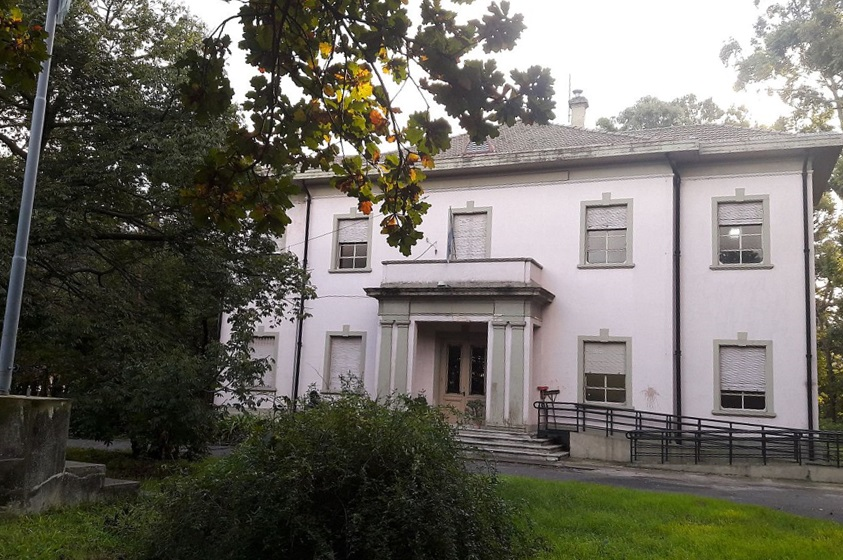
Annex building for parasitology and pathology

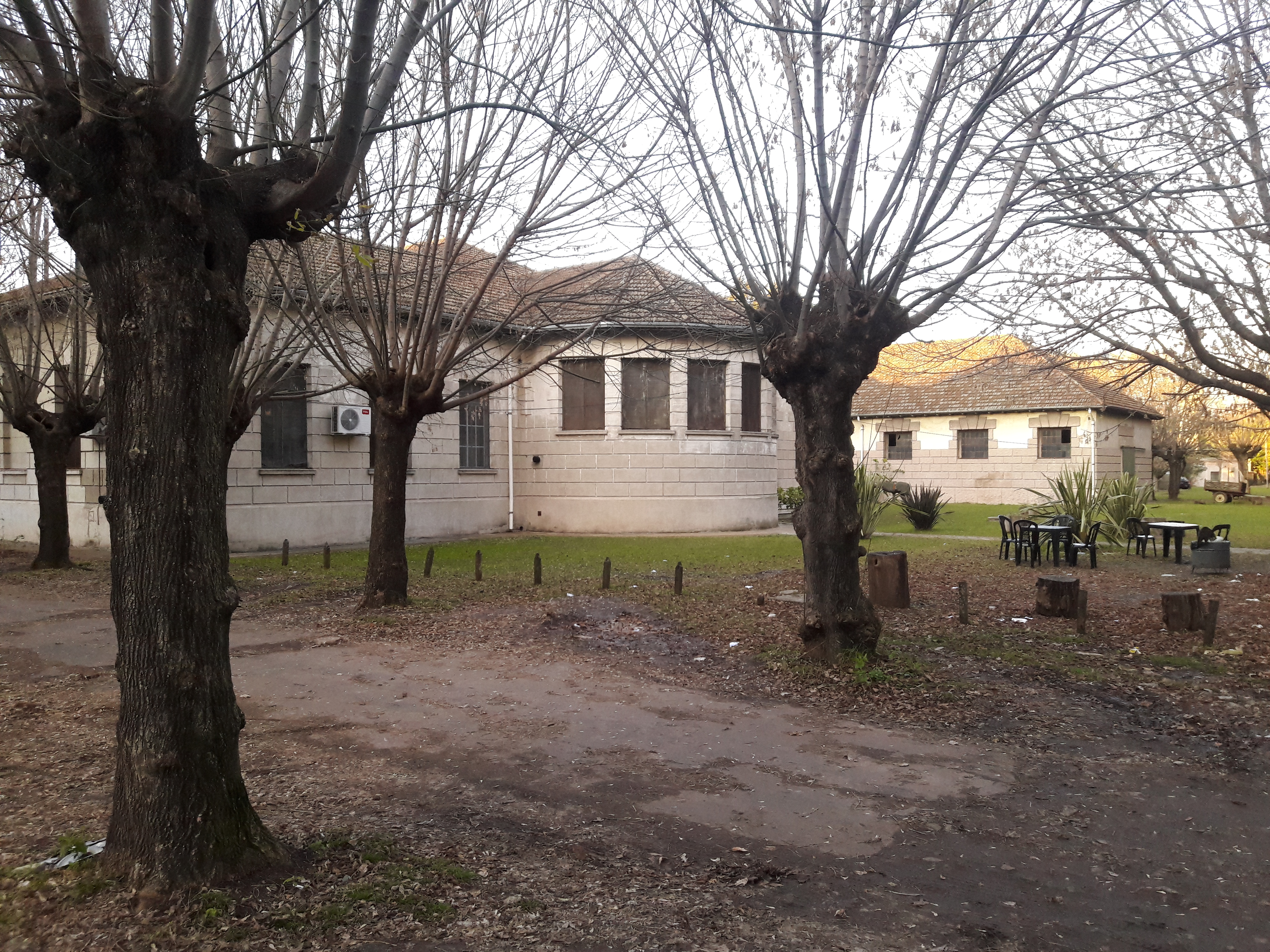
Annex building

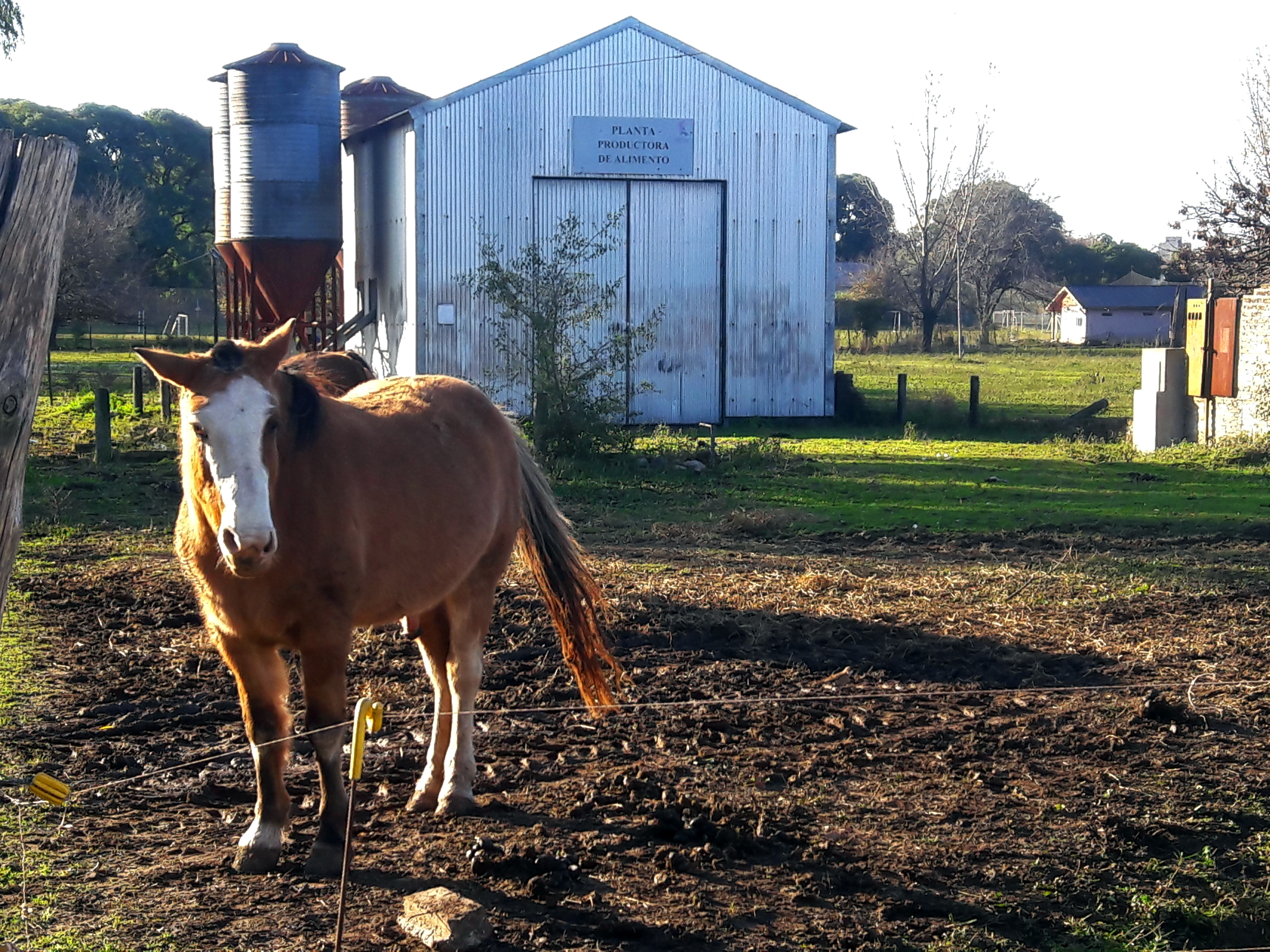
Horse by the agrifood production plant

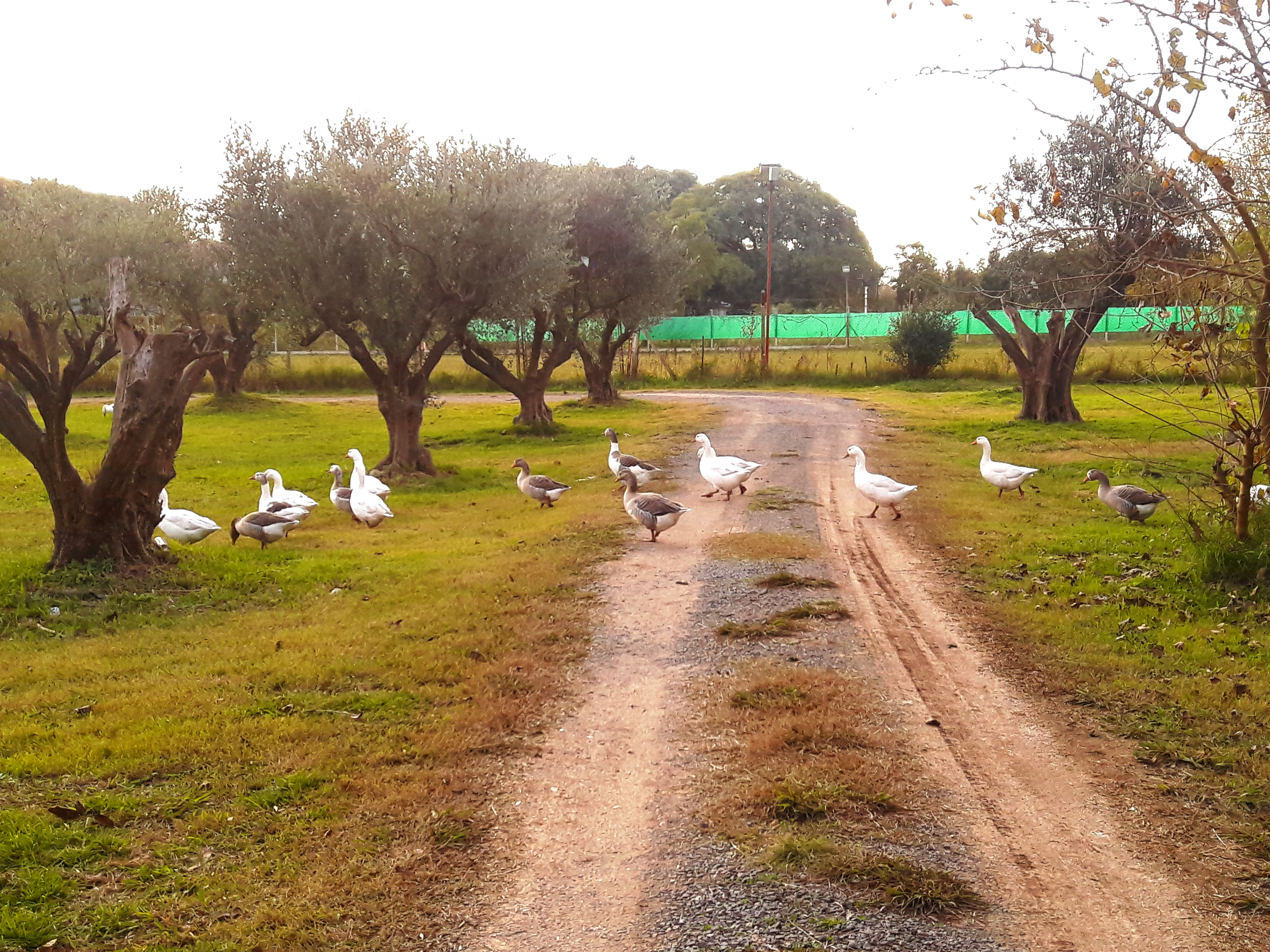
Geese in the FVET campus

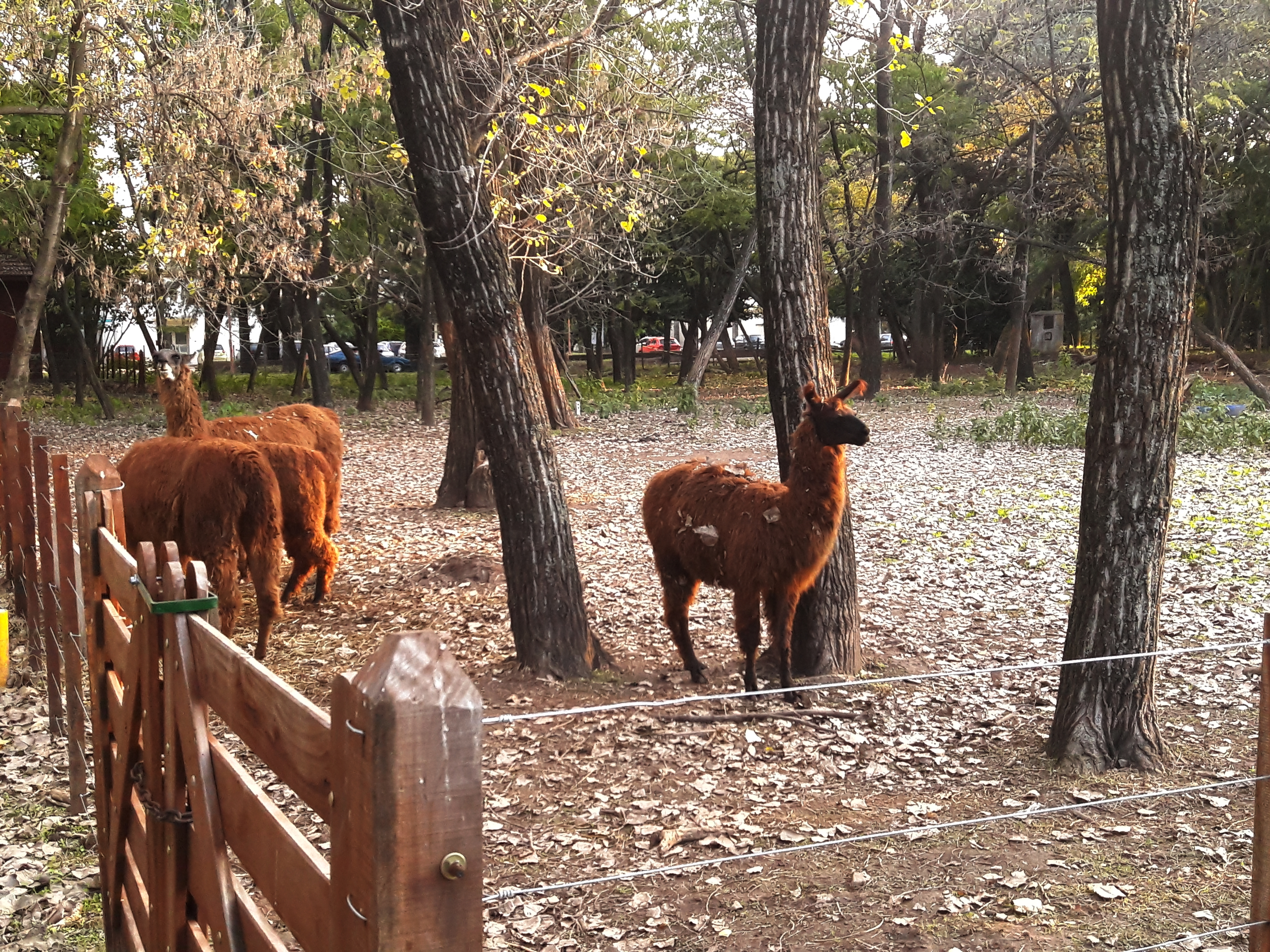
Alpacas

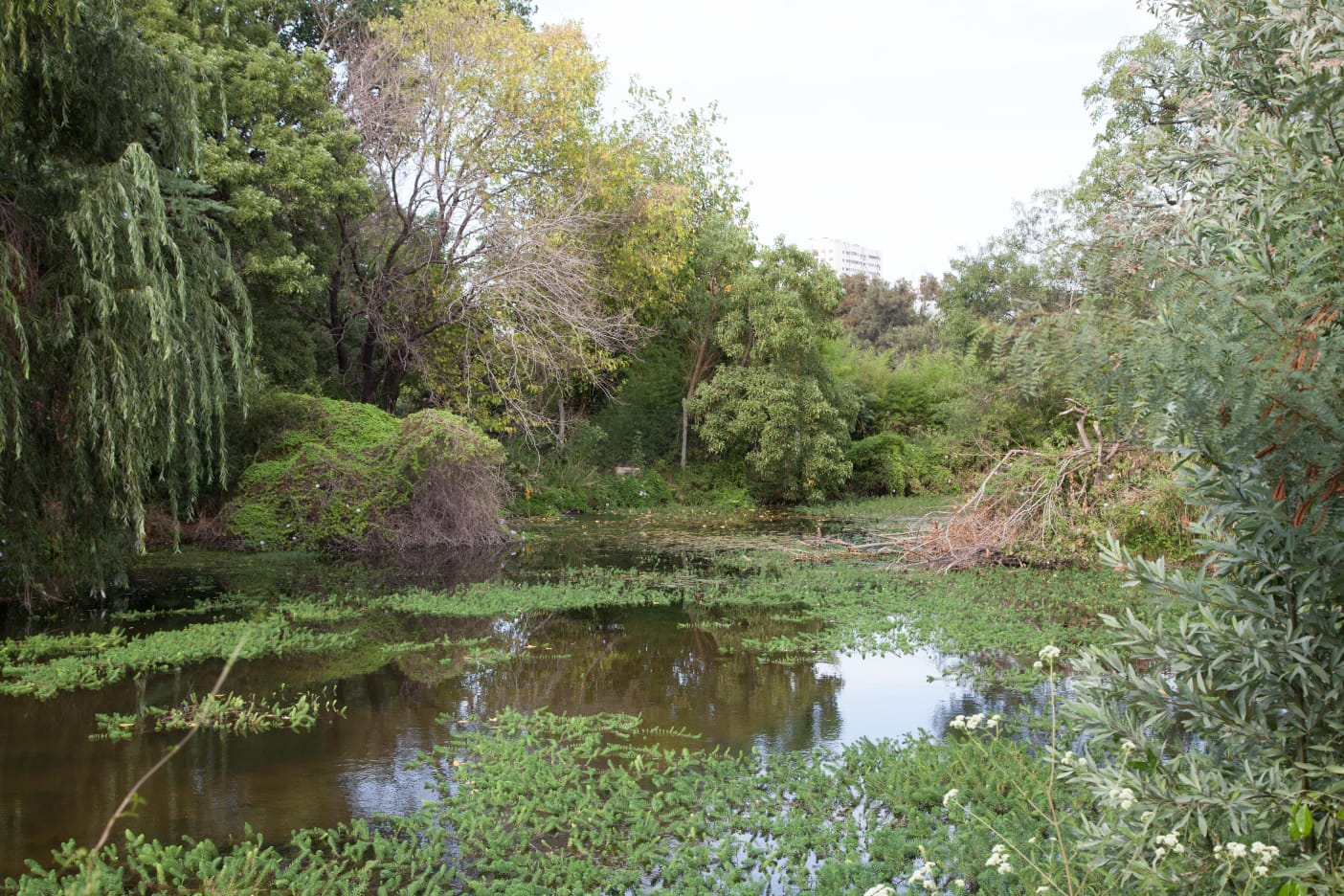
El Renacer de la Laguna, an experimental reserve model located within FVET premises
