= Élida Passo =

Argentine pharmacist

- Born: 1867; Buenos Aires, Argentina
- Died: 1893 (aged 25–26); Buenos Aires, Argentina
- Education: University of Buenos Aires
- Occupation: Pharmacist

Élida Passo (1867–1893) was an Argentine pharmacist, the first woman to practice that profession in her country and the first woman university graduate in South America.

== Biography ==
Élida Passo was born in Buenos Aires in 1867, the daughter of a pharmacist. When she began her higher education, she first pursued a major in Humanities and Philosophy, and had a brief stint in Exact, Physical, and Natural Sciences, both faculties of the University of Buenos Aires. She eventually decided to follow in the footsteps of her father and study pharmacy. She graduated in 1885, becoming the first South American woman to earn a university degree.

Later she wanted to study medicine, but the university authorities denied her entry, arguing that it would be too difficult or uncomfortable for a woman to study with all male colleagues. This led Passo to initiate a judicial appeal which would have great repercussions in the academic field. This ended in her favor and she was able to enroll in the program.

Élida Passo died of tuberculosis in 1893, when she was in her fifth year of study and was close to completing her medical degree and becoming the first woman physician in Argentina. Cecilia Grierson would earn this distinction in 1889.
