= El Paso (disambiguation) =

El Paso is a city in El Paso County, Texas, U.S.

El Paso (Spanish, 'the pass') may also refer to:

== Places ==
=== United States ===
- El Paso, Arkansas
- Garlock, California, a ghost town known as El Paso City
- El Paso County, Colorado
- El Paso, Illinois
- El Paso, Texas
  - El Paso metropolitan area
  - El Paso International Airport
- El Paso, Wisconsin
  - El Paso (community), Wisconsin

=== Other countries ===
- El Paso, Cesar, Colombia
- El Paso, Guyana
- El Paso, La Palma, Canary Islands

== Music ==
- "El Paso" (song), a 1959 song by Marty Robbins
- "El Paso", a song from the 2000 album Bolsa de Agua by The Gourds
- "El Paso", a song from the 2010 album Taking Back Sunday by Taking Back Sunday

== Other uses ==
- El Paso (film), a 1949 Western film
- El Paso Corp., a natural gas producer
- El Paso, Elsewhere, a 2023 video game

== See also ==
- Old El Paso, a brand of Mexican-style food
- Paso Robles, California or El Paso de Robles
