= Passo, Missouri =

Extinct hamlet in Missouri, U.S.

Coordinates: 38°20′20″N 93°25′23″W

Passo is an extinct town in Benton County, in the U.S. state of Missouri. The GNIS classifies it as a populated place.

A post office called Passo was established in 1897, and remained in operation until 1908. The name may be a transfer from El Paso, Texas.
