= Faculty of Law, University of Buenos Aires =

Faculty of Law
- Facultad de Derecho
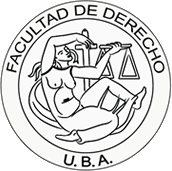
- Type: Faculty
- Established: 1821; 205 years ago
- Affiliations: University of Buenos Aires
- Dean: Leandro Vergara
- Students: 23,790
- Address: Av. Figueroa Alcorta 2263, Buenos Aires, Argentina; 34.3457°S 58.2331°W
- Website: derecho.uba.ar
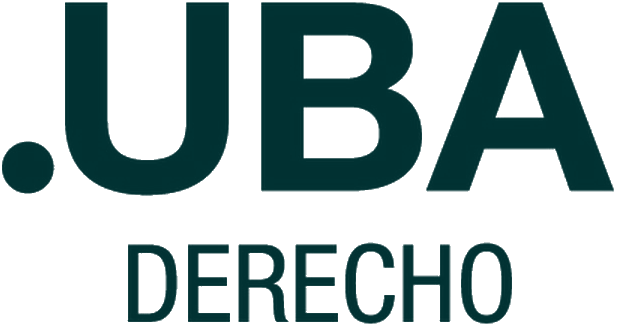

The Faculty of Law (Spanish: Facultad de Derecho) is a faculty of the University of Buenos Aires (UBA), the largest university in Argentina. It was founded alongside the university in 1821, and has consistently remained one of its largest constituent schools, presently counting with 23,790 enrolled graduate students. At the graduate level, it offers law degrees as well as legal translation and forensic calligraphy degrees, in addition to the professorship on judicial sciences.

Among its alumni, the UBA Faculty of Law counts 16 Argentine presidents, as well as one of Argentina's five Nobel Prize laureates, Carlos Saavedra Lamas.

The faculty has its seat at a Neoclassical complex on Avenida Figueroa Alcorta, in the Recoleta district of Buenos Aires. The building was inaugurated in 1949, and has become a landmark of the city. It is served by the Buenos Aires Underground through Facultad de Derecho station of Line H.

== Degrees ==
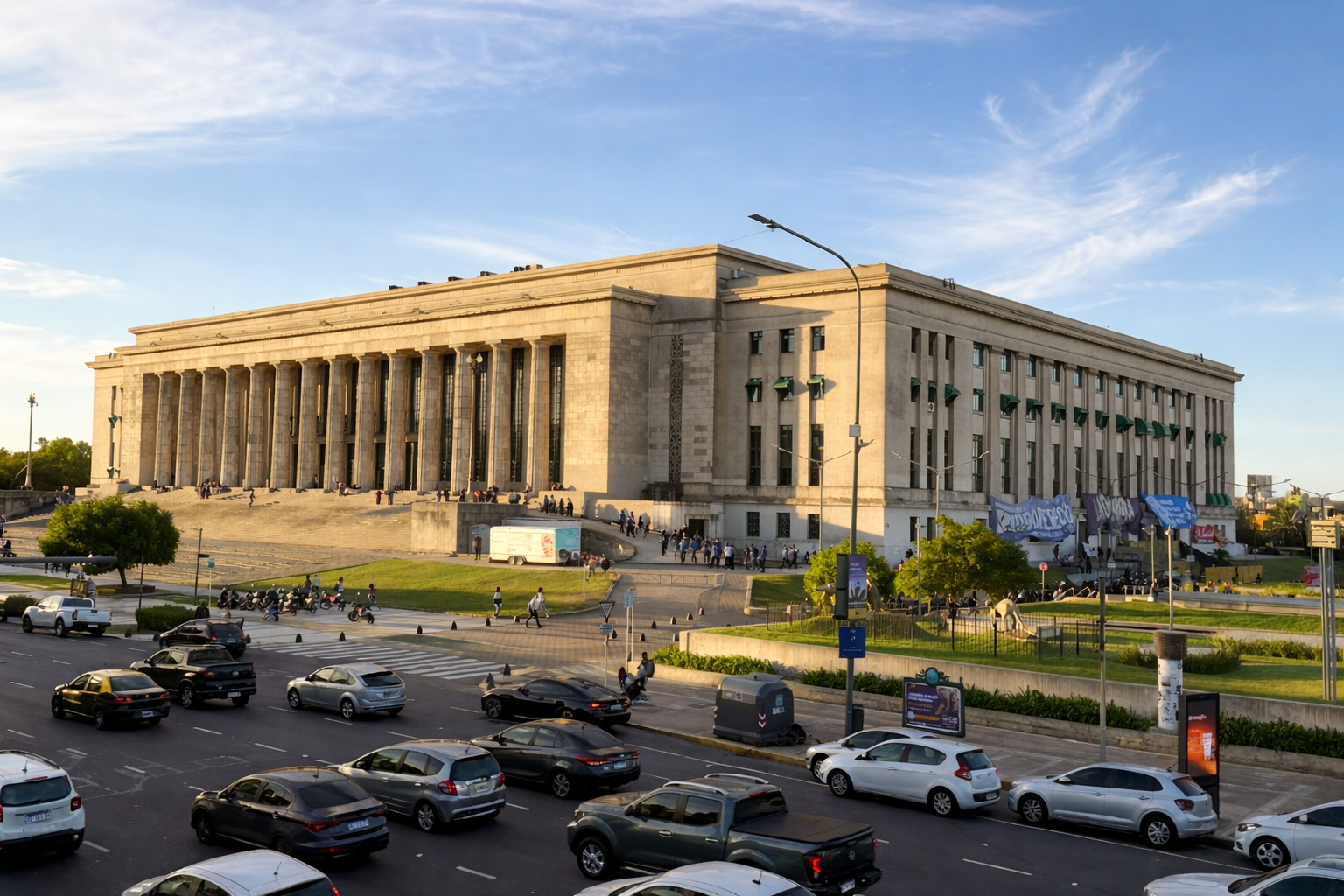
Facade of the faculty in the Recoleta neighborhood of Buenos Aires

The faculty offers four degrees at the graduate level: law degrees (Spanish: abogacía), legal translation, public (forensic) calligraphy, and the professorship of judicial sciences. Law degrees count with a Ciclo Profesional Común (CPC, "common professional cycle") and a Ciclo Profesional Orientado (CPO, "oriented professional cycle"). The CPC makes up the better part of the degree course, with 14 mandatory subjects. Once completed, a law student is given the title of "University Bachelor in Law" (Bachiller Universitario en Derecho). The CPO specializes law students in a specific field of law: public law (either administrative law or international public law, or both), private law, criminal law, corporate law, labor and social security law, tax law, and notary law.

On legal translation, the faculty offers degrees in English, German, French, Italian and Portuguese translation, in addition to "non-regular" languages of the student's choosing, granted there are available professors at the time.

In addition, the faculty offers a number of specialization degrees, as well as magister degrees, doctorates and post-doctoral degrees in diverse fields.

== Political and institutional life ==
Like the rest of the University of Buenos Aires's faculties, the UBA Faculty of Law operates under the principle of tripartite co-governance, wherein authorities are democratically elected and professors, students and graduates are represented in the faculty's governing bodies. The faculty is headed by a dean (Spanish: decano or decana), who presides over the Directive Council (Consejo Directivo). The Directive Council is made up of eight representatives for the professors, four representatives of the student body, and four representatives of the faculty's graduates. Deans are elected by the Directive Council every four years, while elections to the council take place every two years.

Since 2022, the dean of the Faculty of Law has been Dr. Leandro Vergara, with Dr. Silvia Nonna as vice dean.

== Notable alumni ==
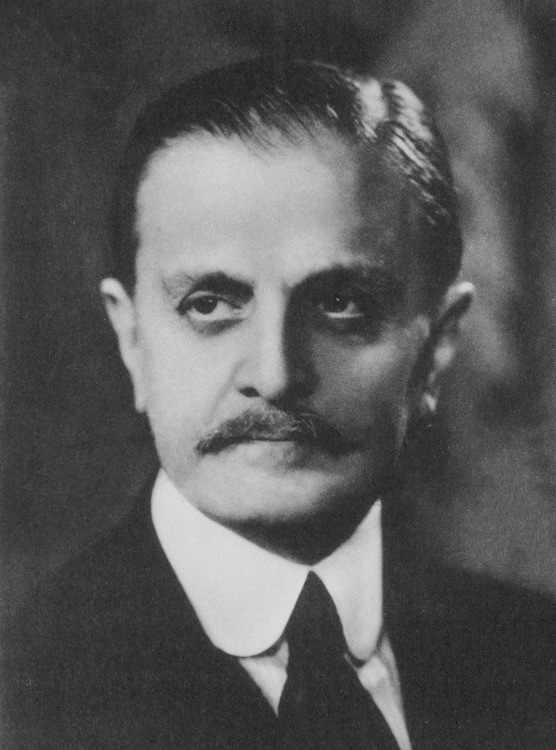
Carlos Saavedra Lamas, Nobel Peace Prize laureate in 1936

Out of the 17 Argentine presidents who have attended the University of Buenos Aires, 16 studied at the Faculty of Law: Carlos Pellegrini, Luis Sáenz Peña, José Evaristo Uriburu, Manuel Quintana, Roque Sáenz Peña, Victorino de la Plaza, Hipólito Yrigoyen, Marcelo T. de Alvear, Roberto Ortiz, Ramón Castillo, Arturo Frondizi, Raúl Alfonsín, Adolfo Rodríguez Saá, Eduardo Duhalde, and Alberto Fernández. Quintana also served as rector of the university, while Alberto Fernández taught courses on criminal law at the graduate level for many years before being elected to the presidency.

The Faculty of Law also educated Carlos Saavedra Lamas, a jurist, diplomat and politician who was awarded the Nobel Peace Prize in 1936 due to his efforts in ceasing hostilities during the Chaco War between Bolivia and Paraguay; Saavedra Lamas was the first Latin American Nobel Peace Prize laureate. He eventually became rector of the University of Buenos Aires in 1941.

A number of relevant jurists have earned their law degrees at the UBA Faculty of Law. Luis Moreno Ocampo, Chief Prosecutor of the International Criminal Court, earned his degree in 1978. International Criminal Tribunal for Rwanda judge Inés Mónica Weinberg de Roca is also a UBA alumna and former faculty, having taught courses on International Private Law from 2001. Several ministers of the Supreme Court of Argentina are UBA alumni as well, such as Enrique S. Petracchi, Carlos Fayt, Carmen Argibay, Elena Highton de Nolasco, and Carlos Rosenkrantz. Prominent legal philosopher Eugenio Bulygin earned his law degree and his PhD at the UBA Faculty of Law, where he also taught throughout his career. Teodosio César Brea, founder of the prominent Allende & Brea law firm, graduated UBA and taught courses at the Faculty of Law as well. Valeria Vegh Weis, criminologist, criminal attorney, and university professor, was also educated at UBA.

=== Argentine presidents educated at the Faculty of Law ===
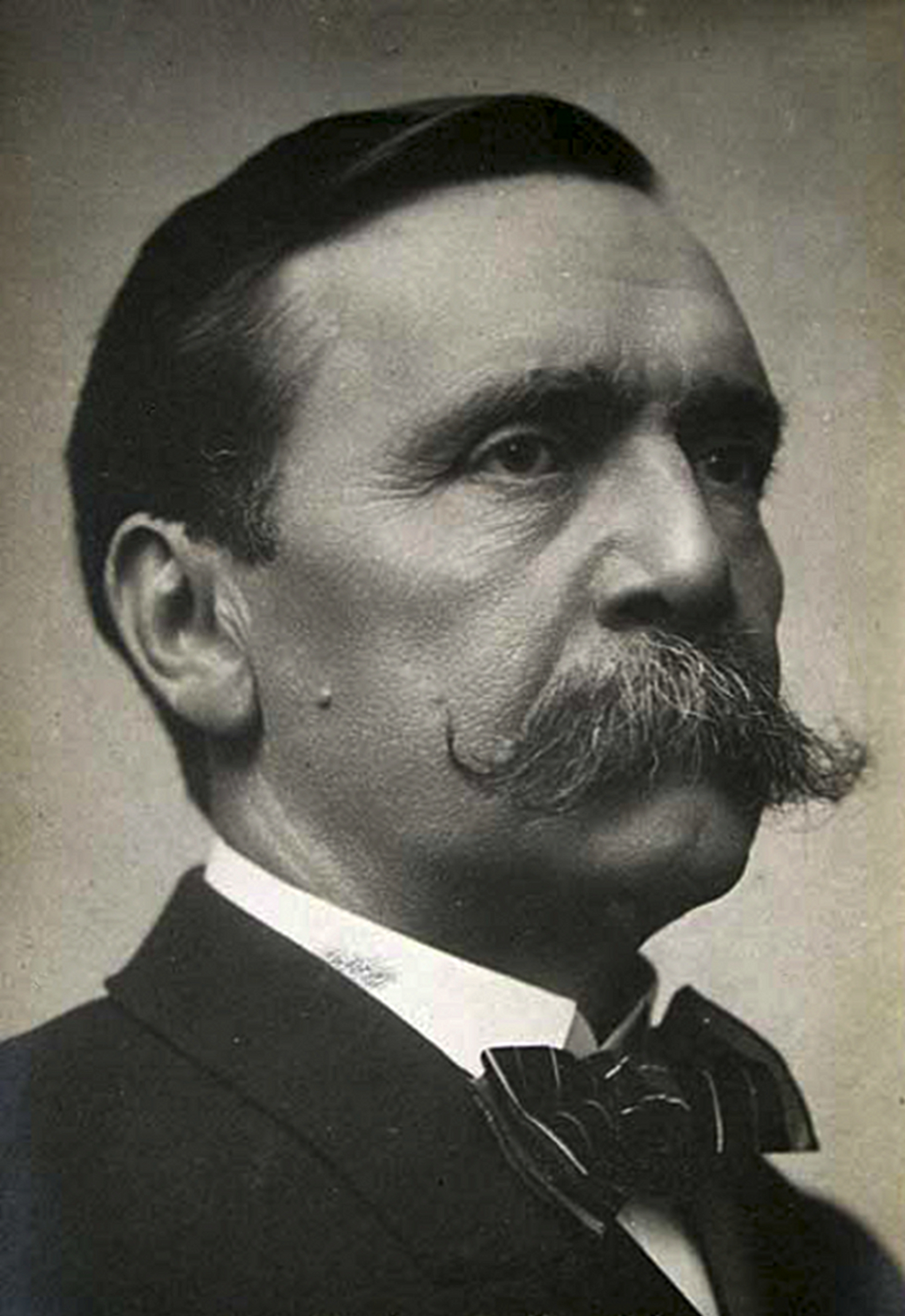
Carlos Pellegrini, 1890–1892

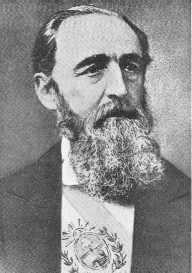
Luis Sáenz Peña, 1892–1895

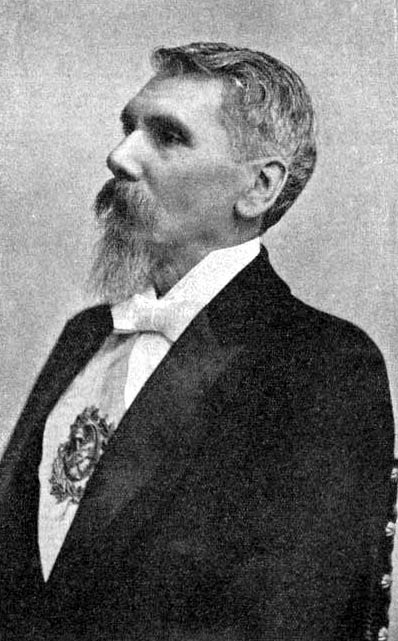
José Evaristo Uriburu, 1895–1898

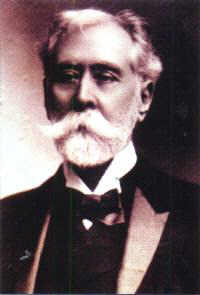
Manuel Quintana, 1904–1906

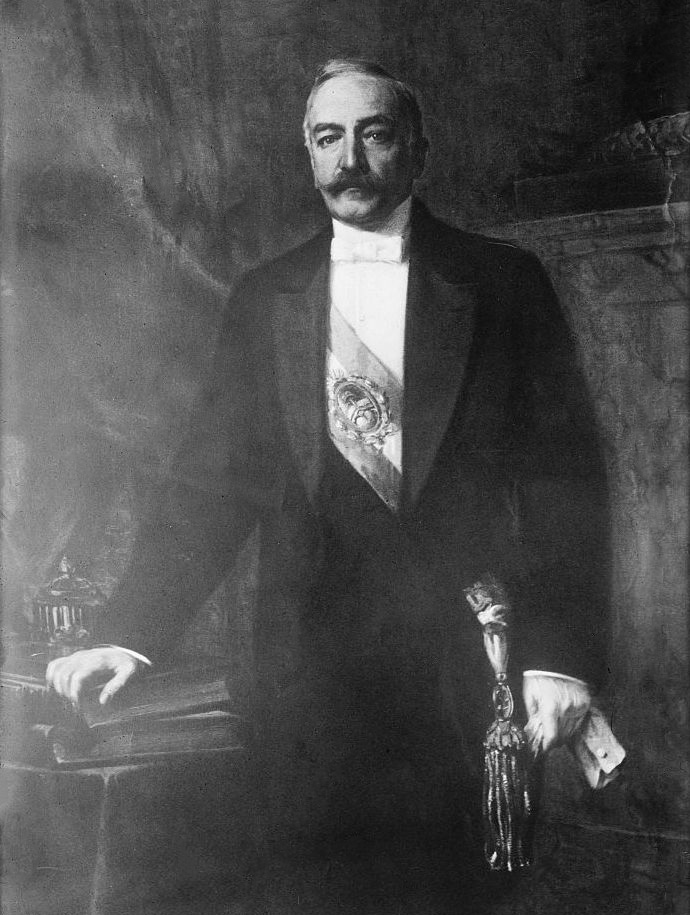
Roque Sáenz Peña, 1910–1914

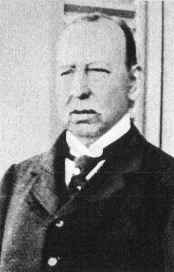
Victorino de la Plaza, 1914–1916

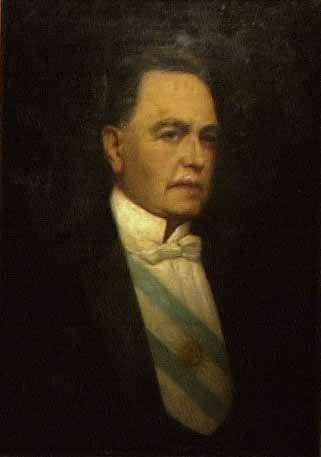
Hipólito Yrigoyen, 1916–1922 and 1928–1930

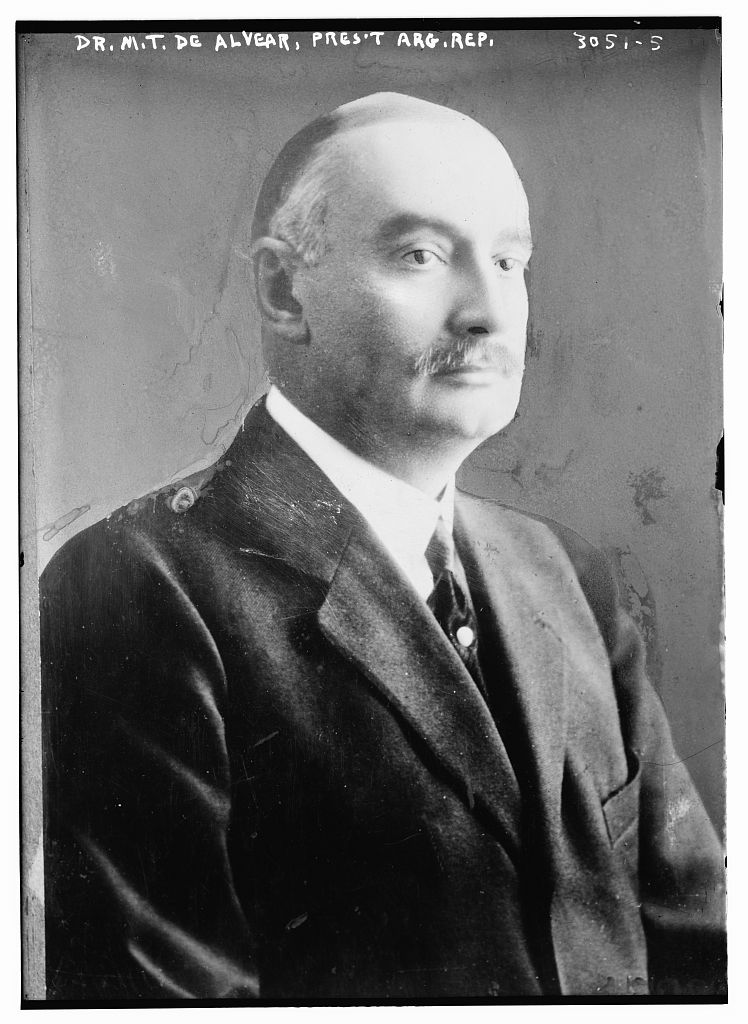
Marcelo T. de Alvear, 1922–1928

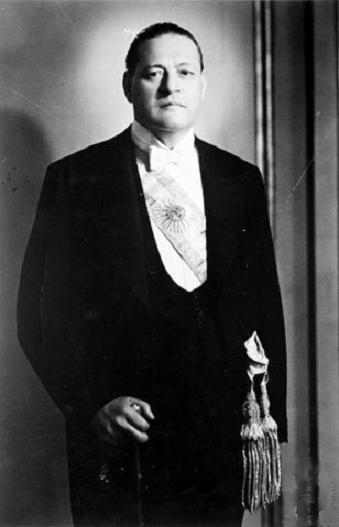
Roberto Ortiz, 1938–1942

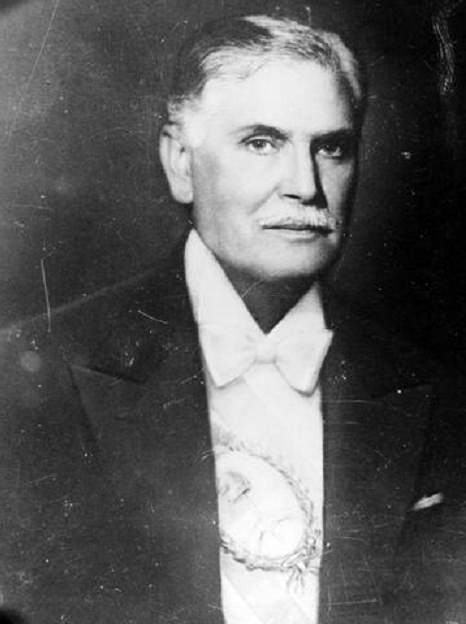
Ramón S. Castillo, 1942–1943

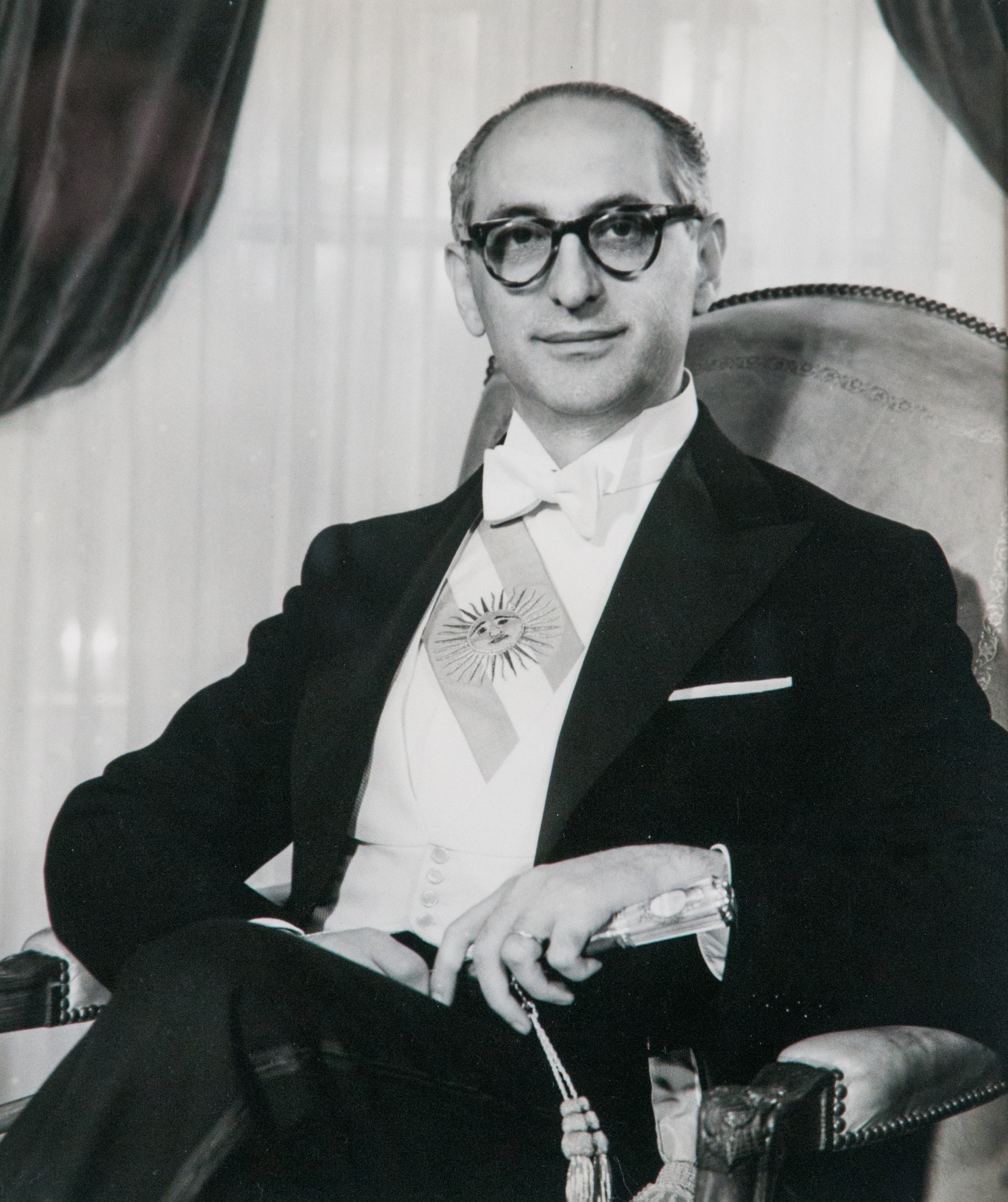
Arturo Frondizi, 1958–1962

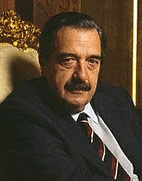
Raúl Alfonsín, 1983–1989

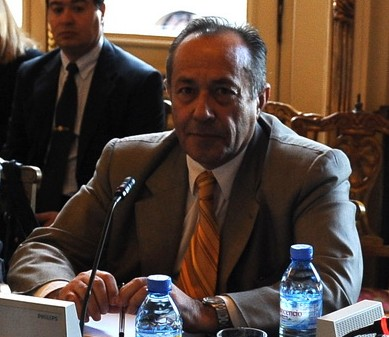
Adolfo Rodríguez Saá, 2001

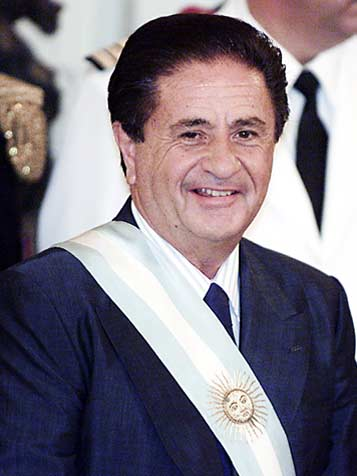
Eduardo Duhalde, 2002–2003

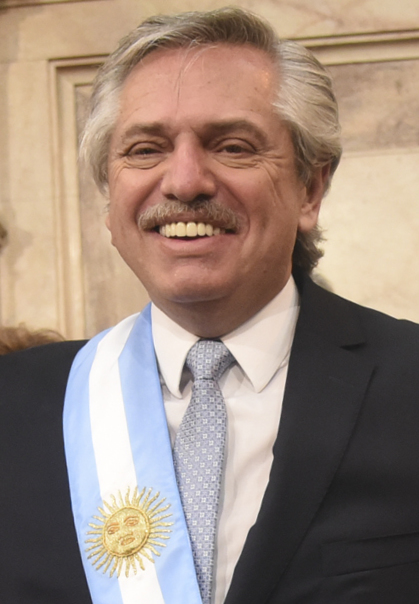
Alberto Fernández, 2019–2023
