= De Robertis (surname) =

De Robertis – also de Robertis, de' Robertis, de' Roberti or DeRobertis – is an Italian surname. People with this name include:

- Ercole de' Roberti (about 1451–1496), Ferrarese artist
- Francesco De Robertis (1902–1959), Italian screenwriter
- Eduardo de Robertis (1913–1988), Argentine physician and biologist
- Edward Michael De Robertis (1947), American embryologist
- Federico De Robertis (born 1962), Italian musician
- Caro De Robertis (born 1975), Uruguayan-American author
- Deborah De Robertis (born 1984), Luxembourgoise performance artist
- Ryan DeRobertis, American electronic musician

== See also ==
- De Rubertis
