= List of Argentine Nobel laureates =

Argentines have won five Nobel Prizes since 1905. The following is a complete list of Nobel laureates from Argentina:

== Laureates ==
Year	Image	Laureate	Born	Died	Field	Citation
1936		Carlos Saavedra Lamas	1 November 1878; Buenos Aires, Argentina	5 May 1959; Buenos Aires, Argentina	Peace	"for his role as father of the Argentine Antiwar Pact of 1933, which he also used as a means to mediate peace between Paraguay and Bolivia in 1935."
1947		Bernardo Houssay	10 April 1887; Buenos Aires, Argentina	21 September 1971; Buenos Aires, Argentina	Physiology or Medicine	"for his discovery of the part played by the hormone of the anterior pituitary lobe in the metabolism of sugar." (awarded together with American biochemists Carl Ferdinand Cori and German biologist Gerty Theresa Cori née Radnitz)
1970		Luis Federico Leloir	6 September 1906; Paris, France	2 December 1987; Buenos Aires, Argentina	Chemistry	"for his discovery of sugar nucleotides and their role in the biosynthesis of carbohydrates."
1980		Adolfo Pérez Esquivel	26 November 1931; Buenos Aires, Argentina		Peace	"for being a source of inspiration to repressed people, especially in Latin America."
1984		César Milstein	8 October 1927; Bahía Blanca, Argentina	24 March 2002; Cambridge, United Kingdom	Medicine	"for theories concerning the specificity in development and control of the immune system and the discovery of the principle for production of monoclonal antibodies" (awarded together with Danish immunologist Niels K. Jerne and German biologist Georges J. F. Köhler)

== Nominees ==
Image	Laureate	Born	Died	Years Nominated	Citation	Nominator(s)
Chemistry
	Luis Federico Leloir	6 September 1906; Paris, France	2 December 1987; Buenos Aires, Argentina	1958, 1961, 1962, 1963, 1964, 1965, 1967, 1968, 1969, 1970		36 nominators
Physiology or Medicine
	Ángel Roffo	30 December 1882; Buenos Aires, Argentina	23 July 1947; Buenos Aires, Argentina	1927, 1937, 1940	"for his clinical and experimental studies on cancer."	Leonidas Avendaño Ureta (1860–1946); Guillermo Bosch Arana (1889–1939); Eduardo Bello Porras (1870–1947)
	Bernardo Houssay	10 April 1887; Buenos Aires, Argentina	21 September 1971; Buenos Aires, Argentina	1931, 1934, 1935, 1936, 1937, 1939, 1940, 1941, 1942, 1943, 1944, 1946, 1947, 1948	"for the discovery of the physiological role of the anterior hypophysis in carbohydrate metabolism and diabetes, work on heart sounds, and the relation of the kidney to hypertension."	46 nominators
Literature
	Manuel Gálvez	18 July 1882; Paraná, Entre Ríos, Argentina	14 November 1962; Buenos Aires, Argentina	1932, 1933, 1934, 1951, 1952		
	Carlos María Ocantos Ziegler	1860; Buenos Aires, Argentina	1949; Madrid, Spain	1933, 1943		Carlos María Cortezo Prieto (1850–1933); Salvador Bermúdez de Castro (1863–1945)
	Enrique Rodríguez Larreta	4 March 1875; Buenos Aires, Argentina	6 July 1961; Buenos Aires, Argentina	1942, 1943, 1944, 1950		
	María Raquel Adler	ca. 1900; Argentine Sea	28 July 1974; Bernal, Argentina	1959, 1965		Consejo del Escritor; Catholic University of Cuyo
	Jorge Luis Borges	24 August 1899; Buenos Aires, Argentina	14 June 1986; Geneva, Switzerland	1956, 1962, 1963, 1965, 1966, 1967, 1969, 1970, 1971		26 nominators
	Victoria Ocampo	7 April 1890; Buenos Aires, Argentina	27 January 1979; Béccar, Argentina	1970		Miguel Alfredo Olivera (1922–2008)
Peace
	Ángela de Oliveira Cézar de Costa	ca. 1860; Gualeguaychú, Entre Ríos, Argentina	25 June 1940; Buenos Aires, Argentina	1910, 1911	"for her efforts to end the conflict between Argentina and Chile."	7 members of the Argentine parliament; Carlos Rodríguez Larreta (1868–1926)
	Estanislao Zeballos	27 July 1854; Rosario, Santa Fe, Argentina	4 October 1923; Liverpool, United Kingdom	1912, 1920, 1922, 1923		7 nominators
	Luis María Drago	6 May 1859; Mercedes, Argentina	9 June 1921; Buenos Aires, Argentina	1914	"for having initiated the Drago Doctrine that opposed forcible collection of debts in any South American republic through military intervention."	Ernesto Bosch (1863–1951)
	Carlos Francisco Melo			1926		Alejandro Mereira (?)
	Carlos Saavedra Lamas	1 November 1878; Buenos Aires, Argentina	5 May 1959; Buenos Aires, Argentina	1935, 1936	"for having drafted Antiwar Pact of 1934 as a means to secure an armistice in the Gran Chaco War between Bolivia and Paraguay, condemning all forms of aggressive war, and any territorial change not effected by peaceful means was not to be recognized."	11 nominators
	Juan Perón	8 October 1895; Lobos, Argentina	1 July 1974; Olivos, Buenos Aires, Argentina	1949		Edmond Michelet (1899–1970); Virgilio Filippo (?)
	Eva Perón	7 May 1919; Los Toldos, Argentina	26 July 1952; Buenos Aires, Argentina	1949		Virgilio Filippo (?)
