= Abbas Eqbal Kitabchi =

Iranian-American doctor

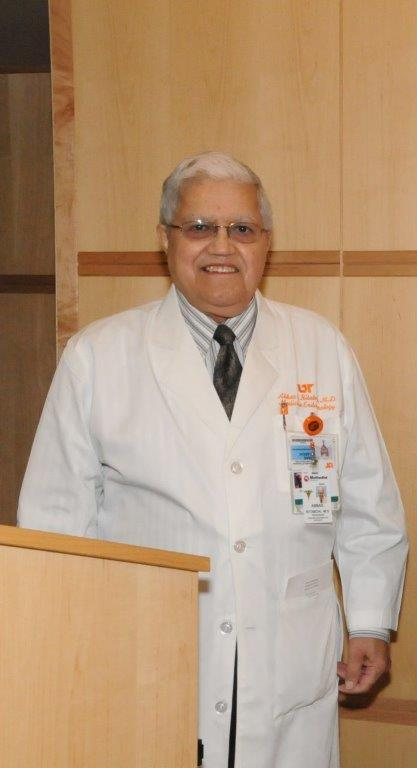
- Born: August 18, 1933; Tehran, Iran
- Died: July 18, 2016 (aged 82); Memphis, Tennessee, U.S.
- Education: Cornell College (BS); University of Oklahoma (MS, PhD, MD)
- Occupations: Director of the Clinical Research Center at University of Tennessee Health Science Center Professor of Medicine and Molecular Sciences; Co-principal investigator for four multicenter National Institutes of Health (NIH)-sponsored studies (DPP/DPOS, DCCT/EDIC, Look AHEAD, and GRADE); Associate Chief of Staff for Research & Education at the Veterans Affairs Hospital (1968-1972); Director of Endocrinology, Diabetes, & Metabolism (1973-2009)

Abbas Eqbal Kitabchi (August 28, 1933 – July 18, 2016) was an Iranian-born American doctor, teacher, and research scientist, whose major contributions in the field of medicine related to the treatment of severe conditions arising from diabetes. He spent his professional career in Memphis, TN and his work influenced the practices of physicians around the nation and the world.

== Early life and education ==
Kitabchi was born in Tehran on August 28, 1933, to Hossein and Fatima Kitabchi. He was the third of seven children, and the first in his family to complete high school. He was also the first to immigrate to the United States, which he did at the age of 17, intent upon pursuing his father's desire for him to become a heart surgeon.

Kitabchi attended Cornell College, in Mount Vernon, Iowa, and received his Bachelor of Science degree in chemistry in 1954. Thereafter, he attended the University of Oklahoma, in Oklahoma City, OK, earning a Master of Science degree in 1956 and a PhD in Chemistry and Biological Sciences in 1958. He continued his postgraduate work in the Department of Physiology, with Ranwel Caputto, where he began research that would lead to his receiving a grant from the National Institutes of Health. In 1965, he received his MD, and in 1966, he attended the University of Washington in Seattle, WA, receiving a fellowship in the endocrinology program, working with Robert H. Williams. It was during this time that he became interested in the treatment of diabetic ketoacidosis (DKA) and hyperglycemia in diabetic patients.

== Career ==
In 1968, Kitabchi joined the Veterans Administration Medical Center at the University of Tennessee Health Sciences Center (UTHSC) in Memphis, TN, as Associate Chief of Staff and Medical Research. In 1972, he became a member of the American Society for Clinical Investigation. In 1973, he was appointed Director of Endocrinology, Diabetes, & Metabolism. During this time, he began clinical trials for the management of DKA and treatment of hyperglycemic crises. He later served as Director of the Clinical Research Center at UTHSC. In 2009, he became the Maston K. Callison Professor of Medicine and Molecular Sciences, and in 2013, Master of the American College of Endocrinology. Among his other professional accomplishments, he was a member of the American Diabetes Association (ADA), the American College of Physicians, the American Society for Clinical Investigation, the Endocrine Society, and the American Association of Clinical Endocrinologists, as well as being on the editorial board of several peer-reviewed journals for diabetes and metabolism.

=== Treatment of DKA ===
In 1973, Kitabchi's first study discovered that low doses of insulin were more effective at resolving DKA, and that intravenous therapy worked more rapidly than subcutaneous or intramuscular methods. In subsequent trials, he continued refining his knowledge and testing various non-insulin therapies, including insulin analogs, His studies with the latter found that in combination with insulin IVs, subcutaneously applied analogs were equally effective, and led to lower hospitalization costs by as much as nearly 40%. His work in this area soon became the standard, dramatically decreasing mortality rates in the U.S. from more than 15% to around 1%. His efforts also led to further therapies involving the use of insulin in the treatment of DKA, diabetes-related cardiovascular risks, inflammation, and other symptoms and issues. Ultimately, his research proved to have a lasting legacy in the understanding of many conditions in diabetic patients, and in providing treatments that led to resolving those conditions and improving their health, and has been adopted by physicians worldwide.

== Legacy ==
Kitabchi retired in 2014, though he continued to work part-time as professor emeritus until his death. In his 45 years of professional activity, he worked with many of the most important medical organizations in the country, including the National Institutes of Health, the American Diabetes Association, and the Emory University School of Medicine. He authored over 300 publications and more than 100 book chapters and reviews. In his time as a professor at UTHSC, he mentored over 80 Endocrinology fellows as well as countless other students.

== Death ==
Kitabchi died on July 18, 2016, at his home in Memphis.
