= Alberto Barbieri =

Alberto Barbieri may refer to:

- Alberto Barbieri (academic) (born 1955), Argentine academic
- Alberto Barbieri (wrestler) (1903–?), Argentine wrestler
- Alberto Barbieri (general) (1882–?), Italian general
