= Ricardo Gelpi =

Argentine physician and academic

Ricardo J. Gelpi

Rector of the University of Buenos Aires
- Incumbent
- Assumed office 2 August 2022
- Preceded by: Alberto Barbieri

Personal details
- Born: 20 October 1950 (age 75) La Plata, Argentina
- Party: Radical Civic Union
- Education: National University of La Plata (Med., Doc.)
- Occupation: Physician

Ricardo Jorge Gelpi (born 20 October 1950) is an Argentine physician and professor, and the current Rector of the University of Buenos Aires (UBA), the largest university in Argentina. Gelpi previously served as dean of the UBA Faculty of Medical Sciences.

A native of La Plata, he studied medicine at the National University of La Plata, graduating in 1976, and later attained a doctoral degree from the same university in 1981. He has conducted research at the National Scientific and Technical Research Council (CONICET). Throughout his career, he has authored or co-authored up to 130 research papers, published in both national and international journals. In addition, he has directed over 20 doctoral theses.

In the Faculty of Medical Sciences, Gelpi served as director of the Department of Pathology, and directed the Department of Cardiovascular Physiopathology. In 2018, he was elected as dean of the faculty.

Gelpi was elected as rector of the university on 24 June 2022 by the University Assembly, with 174 votes in favor, 53 abstentions and 1 vote against. He succeeded accountant Alberto Barbieri in the position. Alongside Gelpi, the assembly elected Emiliano Yacobitti as vice rector, both for the 2022–2026 term. Like Yacobitti, Gelpi is politically associated with the Radical Civic Union (UCR) party.

Academic offices
Preceded by Alberto Barbieri	Rector of the University of Buenos Aires; 2022–present	Incumbent
