= De Rubertis =

de Rubertis is a surname. Notable people with this surname include:

- Francesco De Rubertis (born 1970), venture capitalist
- Giovanni de Rubertis (1813–1889), Italian poet and translator

== See also ==
- De Robertis (surname)
