= Ranwel Caputto =

Argentine chemist (1914–1994)

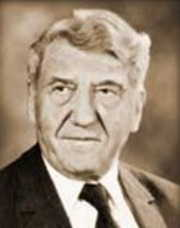
- Argentine Biochemist
- Born: January 1, 1914; Buenos Aires, Argentina
- Died: April 19, 1994 (aged 80); Córdoba, Argentina.
- Occupation: Biochemist
- Spouse: Dora Prieto
- Children: Ranwel Caputto
- Parents: Salvador Caputto (father); Vicenta de Rosa (mother)
- Relatives: Three Siblings: Riobó Caputto, Lilia Libertad Caputto, and an Unknown Sibling
- Awards: John Simon Guggenheim Memorial Foundation Fellowship (1952)

Ranwel Caputto was an Argentine biochemist. He was born in Buenos Aires, Argentina on January 1, 1914, and died on April 19, 1994.

== Career ==
He began his research in Córdoba after some time at the University of Cambridge, England. He returned to Argentina and joined the team of Dr. Federico Leloir undertaking important research that was influential in the work for the Nobel Prize with which he was honored. In 1963 he joined the Faculty of Chemical Sciences of the National University of Córdoba where he began an active area of research in Biological Chemistry. His main line of research was related to brain lipids, but he also made important contributions on other topics.

Ranwel Caputto worked with Luis Leloir, Carlos E. Cardini, Raúl Trucco and Alejandro C. Paladini on the metabolism of galactose later leading to the isolation of glucose 1,6-diphosphate and uridine diphosphate glucose. Caputto actually initiated this project by presenting some preliminary results indicating that mammary gland homogenates could produce lactose when incubated with glycogen.

Caputto's Reaction

== Family ==
Ranwel's father Salvador Caputto (1886-1939) was founder of El Litoral, a popular Argentine newspaper. Ranwel has two living grandchildren (both boys) and one of them, Carlos, currently runs El Litoral.
