= Ángela de Oliveira Cézar de Costa =

Argentine twice nominated for the Nobel Peace Prize

Distinguished Ladies or Christian Ladies Ángela de Oliveira Cézar de Costa
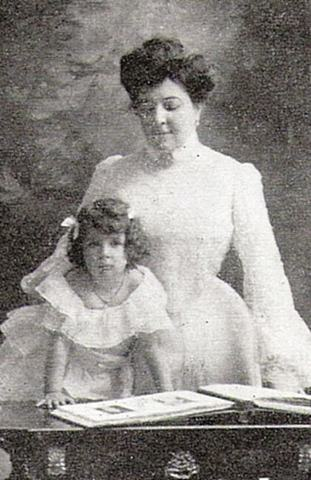
- Born: 1860; Gualeguaychú, Entre Rios, Argentina
- Died: June 25, 1940; Buenos Aires, Argentina
- Spouse: Pascual Costa
- Family: Sister-Guillermina Oliveira Cézar

Ángela de Oliveira Cézar de Costa (1860 – 25 June 1940) was an Argentine member of the Commission of the Permanent International Peace Bureau, which was awarded the Nobel Peace Prize in 1910. She was directly nominated for the Nobel Peace Prize in 1910 and 1911 for her work to end the Argentine–Chilean naval arms race by raising a statue of Christ the Redeemer of the Andes in 1904. She became the first Argentine nominee for the Nobel Peace Prize.

== Christ the Redeemer of the Andes ==
This section only deals with Ángela de Oliveira Cézar de Costa's participation in the erection of the statue, for a complete explanation see Christ the Redeemer of the Andes.

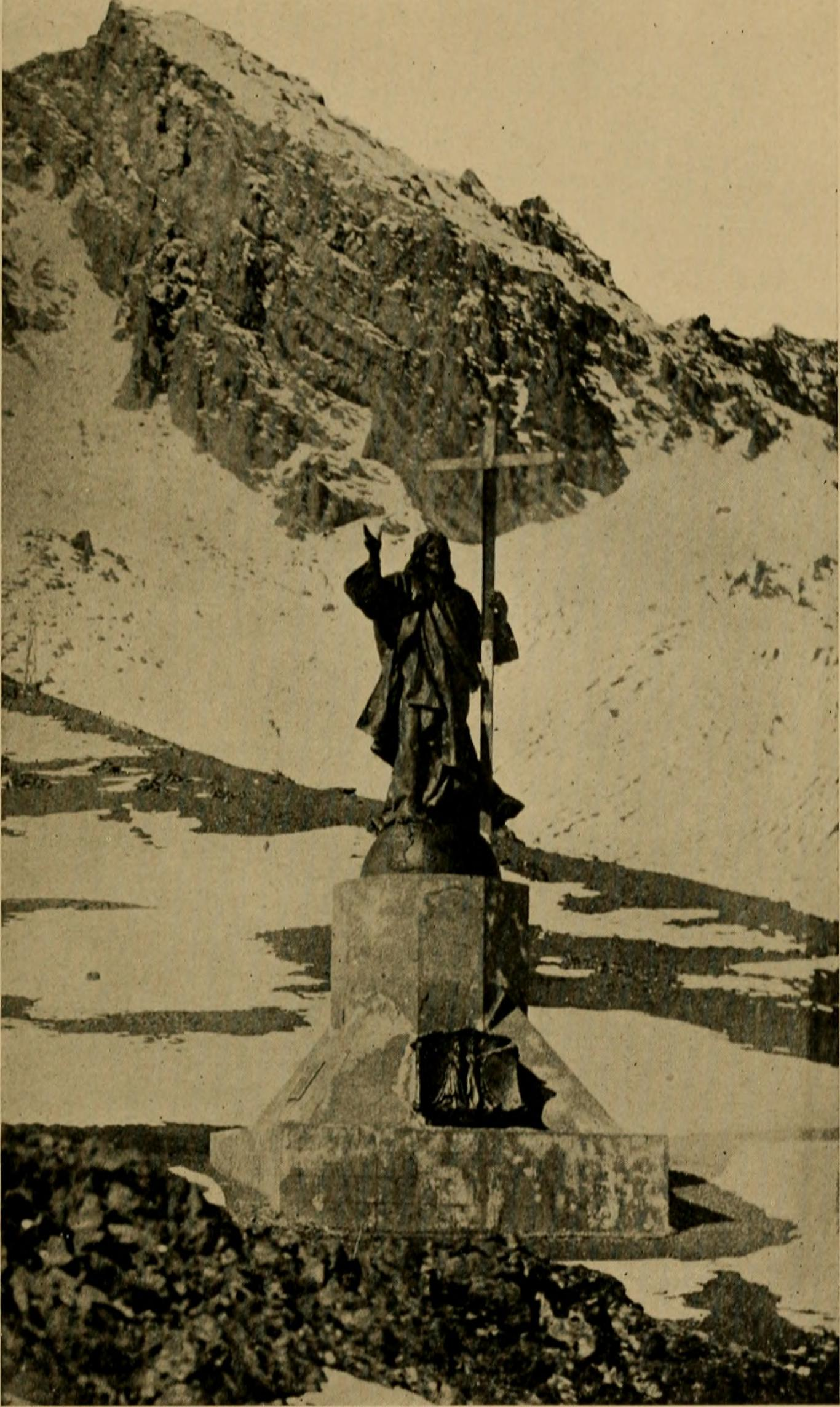
A Historic photo of Christ the Redeemer of the Andes

As the Argentine–Chilean naval arms race came to an end with the Pacts of May Argentine President Julio Argentino Roca wanted to create a symbol to represent the peace. Oliviera Cézar proposed erecting a large statue of Jesus Christ on the Argentina–Chile border. Friar Marcelino Benavarte had previously commissioned a monument from Mateo Alonso that Oliviera Cézar knew about because of her participation in a Dominican Order for mothers. President Roca liked the idea and Oliviera Cézar led the efforts to pay for the statue.

=== Public reception ===
Initially media reports gave credit for the idea to the society as a whole or the Argentine Catholic church.

José A. Terry one of the signatories of the Pacts of May took offense at the statue and even tried to remove a portion of it that looked like Oliviera Cézar.
