= Valeria Vegh Weis =

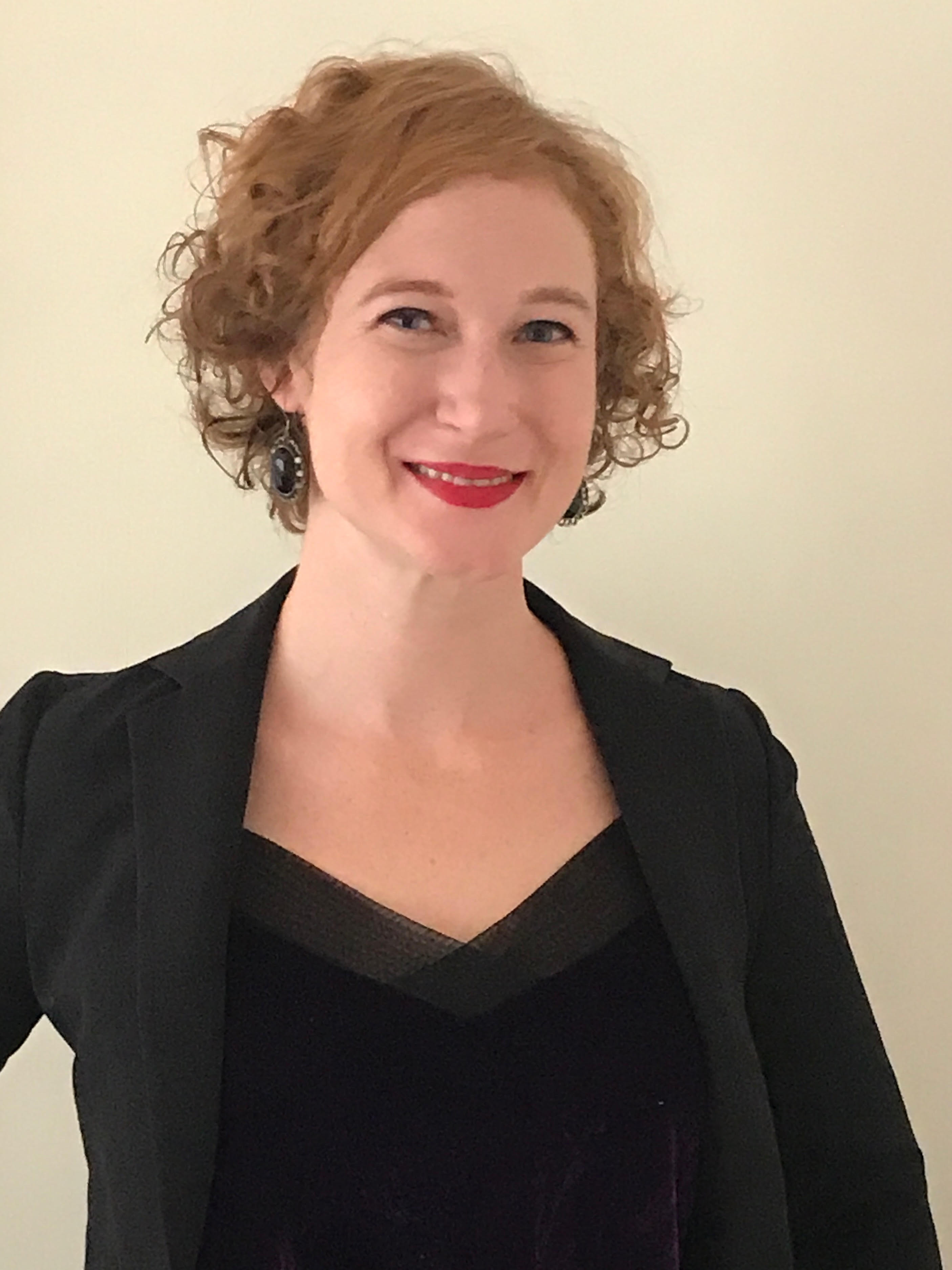
Valeria Vegh Weis

Valeria Vegh Weis is a Research Group Leader at the School of Law and a Research Fellow at the Zukunftskolleg (University of Konstanz, Germany). Her current research project focuses on the role of victim organisations dealing with the legacies of massive human rights violations. She is also a Professor at Buenos Aires University and Quilmes National University. She is the Vice President of the Instituto Latinoamericano de Criminología y Desarrollo Social .

She is a prolific Argentinean-German author who has had more than 100 articles and book chapters published in Spanish, English, Portuguese and German . She specializes in criminology, criminal law, international criminal law and transitional justice, which she approaches from a decolonial and socio-legal perspective. Vegh Weis won several awards, including the Critical Criminology of the Year Award by the American Society of Criminology . She is the author of the Principles on Public Policies for Memory in the Americas (Principios sobre Políticas Públicas de Memoria en las Americas) approved by the Organization of American States .

Her research has been supported, among others, by the Alexander von Humboldt Foundation, the Max Planck Society, the Fulbright Commission and the Horizon European Union Programme.

== Biography ==
Vegh Weis graduated summa cum laude from Buenos Aires University Law School. She pursued post-graduate studies in Criminal Law at Buenos Aires University School of Law and a Master in International Legal Studies at New York University. She also pursued a PhD in Law at the same university and defended her thesis on a Marxist perspective of criminal selectivity. She received also received funding from CONICET, Hauser Global, the International Law and Human Rights and the Transitional Justice Program, among many others. She has been a Visiting Scholar at Strathmore University, Freie Universitat Berlin,University of Oxford and Waseda University and a Fellow at the Max Planck Institute for European Legal History. She has been serving on the Argentinean Judiciary since 2005 and has also worked as Legal Expert at the Inter-American Commission on Human Rights

== Books ==
- Gomez Alcorta, Vegh Weis (2025) Jujuy. El laboratorio de la represión .
- Vegh Weis (2024) Todo Preso es Político. Una Historia de la (In)Justicia Penal. CLACSO .
- Zaffaroni, Caamaño, Vegh Weis (2020) Bienvenidos al Lawfare: Manual para Destruir al Derecho Penal. Capital Intelectual .
- Zaffaroni, Caamaño, Vegh Weis (2023), Lawfare: The Criminalisation of Politics in the Global South. Haymarket .
- Vegh Weis, Valeria (2021). Criminalization of Activism. Historical, Present and Future Perspectives .
- Vegh Weis, Valeria (2017). Marxism and Criminology. A History of Criminal Selectivity. Boston: Brill. ISBN 978-90-04-31956-1. Haymarket Books (2018) ISBN 9781608469307. The preface was written by Kent University Professor Roger Matthews and the foreword was authored by UC Berkeley Professor of Law Jonathan Simon. The book received the American Library Association Outstanding Academic Title award i. Art cover by Enzo Leone. The book also received the Outstanding Book Award from the Academy of Criminal Justice Sciences.
