= Alberto Barbieri (academic) =

Argentine academic

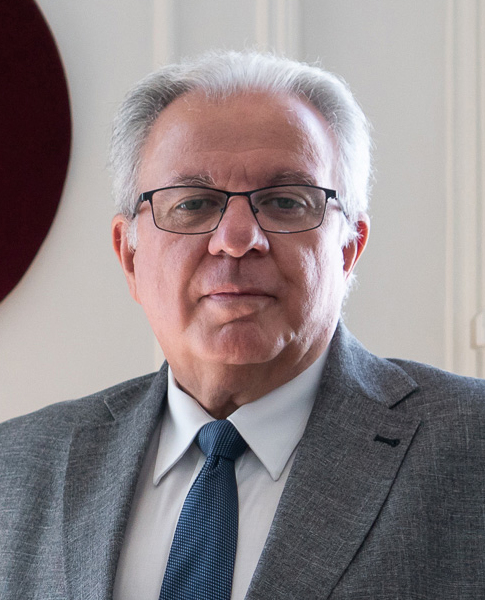
Portrait of Alberto Barbieri

Alberto Barbieri is an Argentine academic, former rector of the University of Buenos Aires.

Academic offices
Preceded by Rubén E. Hallú	Rector of the University of Buenos Aires; 2013–2022	Succeeded by Ricardo Gelpi
