= Luis Federico Leloir =

Argentine physician and biochemist (1906–1987)

Luis Federico Leloir ForMemRS
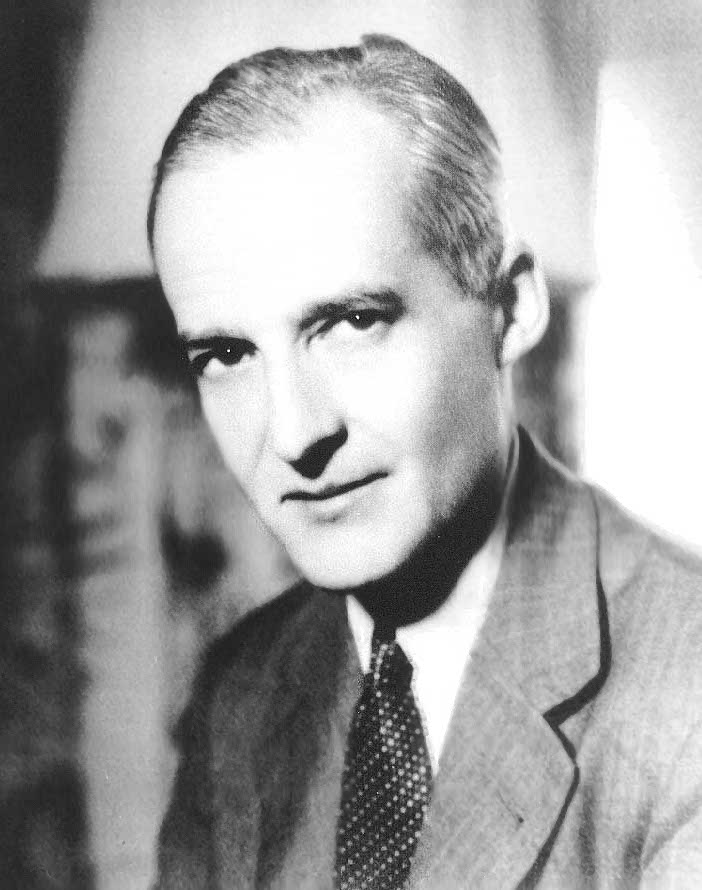
- An early photograph of Leloir in his twenties
- Born: 6 September 1906; Paris, France
- Died: 2 December 1987 (aged 81); Buenos Aires, Argentina
- Education: University of Buenos Aires
- Known for: Galactosemia; Lactose intolerance Carbohydrate metabolism
- Awards: Louisa Gross Horwitz Prize (1967); Nobel Prize in Chemistry (1970); Legion of Honour (1982)
- Scientific career
- Fields: Biochemistry
- Workplaces: University of Buenos Aires; Washington University in St. Louis (1943–1944); Columbia University (1944–1945); Fundación Instituto Campomar (1947–1981); University of Cambridge (1936–1943)

Luis Federico Leloir ForMemRS (6 September 1906 – 2 December 1987) was an Argentine physician and biochemist who received the 1970 Nobel Prize in Chemistry for his discovery of the metabolic pathways by which carbohydrates are synthesized and converted into energy in the body. Although born in France, Leloir received the majority of his education at the University of Buenos Aires and was director of the private research group Fundación Instituto Campomar until his death in 1987. His research into sugar nucleotides, carbohydrate metabolism, and renal hypertension garnered international attention and led to significant progress in understanding, diagnosing and treating the congenital disease galactosemia. Leloir is buried in La Recoleta Cemetery, Buenos Aires.

== Biography ==
=== Early years ===
Leloir's parents, Federico Augusto Rufino and Hortencia Aguirre de Leloir, traveled from Buenos Aires to Paris in the middle of 1906 with the intention of treating Federico's illness. However, Federico died in late August, and a week later Luis was born in an old house at 81 Víctor Hugo Road in Paris, a few blocks away from the Arc de Triomphe. After returning to Argentina in 1908, Leloir lived together with his eight siblings on their family's extensive property El Tuyú that his grandparents had purchased after their immigration from the Basque Country of northern Spain: El Tuyú comprises 400 km^{2} of sandy land along the coastline from San Clemente del Tuyú to Mar de Ajó which has since become a popular tourist attraction. Luis Federico was first cousin of Victoria Ocampo on their mothers’ side. Leloir’s mother, Hortensia Aguirre, was the sister of Ramona Aguirre, the mother of Victoria and Silvina Ocampo.

During his childhood, he would observe natural phenomena with particular interest; his schoolwork and readings highlighted the connections between the natural sciences and biology. His education was divided between Escuela General San Martín (primary school), Colegio Lacordaire (secondary school), and for a few months at Beaumont College in England. His grades were unspectacular, and his first stint in college ended quickly when he abandoned his architectural studies that he had begun in Paris' École Polytechnique.

It was during the 1920s that Leloir invented salsa golf (golf sauce). After being served prawns with the usual sauce during lunch with a group of friends at the Ocean Club in Mar del Plata, Leloir came up with a peculiar combination of ketchup and mayonnaise to spice up his meal. With the financial difficulties that later plagued Leloir's laboratories and research, he would joke, "If I had patented that sauce, we'd have a lot more money for research right now."

=== Career ===
==== Buenos Aires ====
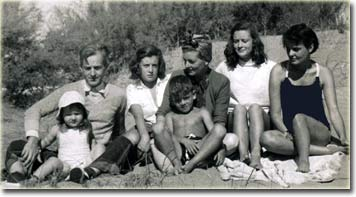
Leloir (top left) with family on an Argentine resort, 1951

After returning again to Argentina, Leloir obtained his Argentine citizenship and joined the Department of Medicine at the University of Buenos Aires in hopes of receiving his doctorate. However, he got off to a rocky start, requiring four attempts to pass his anatomy exam. He finally received his diploma in 1932 and began his residency in the Hospital de Clínicas and his medical internship in Ramos Mejía hospital. After some initial conflicts with colleagues and complications in his method of treating patients, Leloir decided to dedicate himself to research in the laboratory, claiming that "we could do little for our patients... antibiotics, psychoactive drugs, and all the new therapeutic agents were unknown [at the time]."

In 1933, he met Bernardo Houssay, who pointed Leloir towards investigating in his doctoral thesis the suprarenal glands and carbohydrate metabolism. Houssay happened to be friends with Carlos Bonorino Udaondo, the brother-in-law of Victoria Ocampo, one of Leloir's cousins. Following the recommendation of Udaondo, Leloir began working with Houssay, who in 1947 would later win the Nobel Prize for Physiology or Medicine. The two would develop a close relationship, collaborating on various projects until Houssay's death in 1971; in his lecture after winning the Nobel Prize, Leloir claimed that his "whole research career has been influenced by one person, Prof. Bernardo A. Houssay".

==== Cambridge ====
After only two years, Leloir received recognition from the medical department at the University of Buenos Aires for having produced the best doctoral thesis. Feeling that his knowledge in fields such as physics, mathematics, chemistry, and biology is lacking, he continued attending classes at the university as a part-time student. In 1936 he traveled to England to begin advanced studies at the University of Cambridge, under the supervision of another Nobel Prize winner, Sir Frederick Gowland Hopkins, who had obtained that distinction in 1929 for his work in physiology and in revealing the critical role of vitamins in maintaining good health. Leloir's research in the Biochemical Laboratory of Cambridge centered around enzymes, more specifically the effects of cyanide and pyrophosphate on succinic dehydrogenase; from this moment Leloir began to specialize in researching carbohydrate metabolism.

==== United States ====
Leloir returned to Buenos Aires in 1937 after his brief stay at Cambridge. 1943 saw Leloir marry; Luis Leloir and Amelia Zuberbuhler (1920–2013) would later have a daughter also named Amelia. However, his return to Argentina was amidst conflict and strife; Houssay had been expelled from the University of Buenos Aires for signing a public petition opposing the Nazi regime in Germany and the military government led by Pedro Pablo Ramírez. Leloir fled to the United States, where he assumed the position of associate professor in the Department of Pharmacology at Washington University School of Medicine in St. Louis, collaborating with Carl Cori and Gerty Cori and thereafter worked with David E. Green at the Columbia University College of Physicians and Surgeons as a research assistant. Leloir would later credit Green with instilling within him the initiative to establish his own research in Argentina.

==== Fundación Instituto Campomar ====
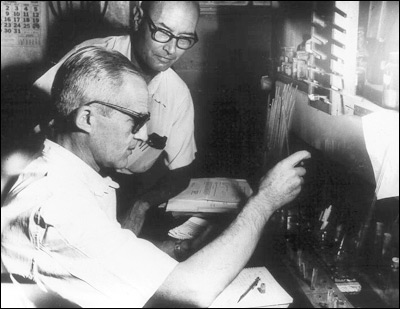
Luis Leloir and Carlos Eugenio Cardini at work in the Fundación Instituto Campomar, 1960.

In 1945, Leloir ended his exile and returned to Argentina to work under Houssay at the Instituto de Investigaciones Bioquímicas de la Fundación Campomar, which Leloir would direct from its creation in 1947 by businessman and patron Jaime Campomar. Initially, the institute was composed of five rooms, a bathroom, central hall, patio, kitchen, and changing room. During the final years of the 1940s, although lacking financial resources and operating with very low-cost teams, Leloir's successful experiments would reveal the chemical origins of sugar synthesis in yeast as well as the oxidation of fatty acids in the liver; together with J. M. Muñoz, he produced an active cell-free system, a first in scientific research. It had initially been assumed that in order to study a cell, scientists could not separate it from its host organism, as oxidation could only occur in intact cells. Along the way, Muñoz and Leloir, unable to procure the costly refrigerated centrifuge needed to separate cell contents, improvised by spinning a tire stuffed with salt and ice.

By 1947 he had formed a team that included Ranwel Caputto, Enrico Cabib, Raúl Trucco, Alejandro Paladini, Carlos Cardini and José Luis Reissig, with whom he investigated and discovered why a malfunctioning kidney and angiotensin helped cause hypertension. That same year, his colleague Caputto, in his investigations of the mammary gland, made discoveries regarding carbohydrate storage and its subsequent transformation into a reserve energy form in organisms.

==== Sugar nucleotides ====
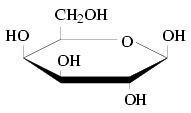
Chemical structure of galactose. Leloir and his team discovered that in galactosemia, patients lacked the necessary enzyme (Galactose-1-phosphate uridylyltransferase) to convert unusable galactose into usable glucose.

At the beginning of 1948, Leloir and his team identified the sugar nucleotides that were fundamental to the metabolism of carbohydrates, turning the Instituto Campomar into a biochemistry institution well known throughout the world. Immediately thereafter, Leloir received the Argentine Scientific Society Prize, one of the many awards he would receive both in Argentina and internationally. During this time, his team dedicated itself to the study of glycoproteins; Leloir and his colleagues elucidated the primary mechanisms of galactose metabolism (now called the Leloir pathway) and determined the cause of galactosemia, a serious genetic disorder that resulted in lactose intolerance.

The following year, he reached an agreement with Rolando García, dean of the Faculty of Exact and Natural Sciences at the University of Buenos Aires, which named Leloir, Carlos Eugenio Cardini and Enrico Cabib as titular professors in the university's newly founded Biochemical Institute. The institute would help develop scientific programs in budding Argentine universities as well as attract researchers and scholars from the United States, Japan, England, France, Spain, and other Latin American countries.

Following Jaime Campomar's death in 1957, Leloir and his team applied to the National Institutes of Health in the United States desperate for funding, and surprisingly was accepted. In 1958, the institute found a new home in a former all-girls school, a donation from the Argentine government. As Leloir and his research gained greater prominence, further research came from the Argentine Research Council, and the institute would later become associated with the University of Buenos Aires.

=== Later years ===
In his later years Leloir continued to study glycogen and other aspects of carbohydrate metabolism.

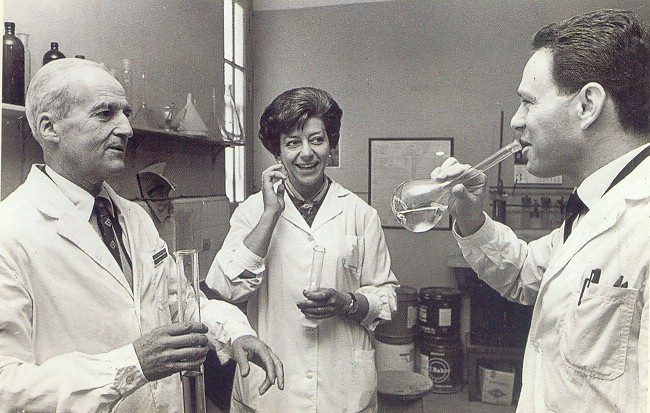
Leloir celebrating with colleagues December 10, 1970, after winning the Nobel Prize.

As his work in the laboratory was coming to an end, Leloir continued his teaching position in the Department of Natural Sciences at the University of Buenos Aires, taking a hiatus only to complete his studies at Cambridge and at the Enzyme Research Laboratory in the United States.

In 1983, Leloir became one of the founding members of the Third World Academy of Sciences, later renamed The World Academy of Sciences.

==== Nobel Prize ====
On December 2, 1970, Leloir received the Nobel Prize for Chemistry from the King of Sweden for his discovery of the metabolic pathways in lactose, becoming only the third Argentine to receive the prestigious honor in any field at the time. In his acceptance speech at Stockholm, he borrowed from Winston Churchill's famous 1940 speech to the House of Commons and remarked, "never have I received so much for so little". Leloir and his team reportedly celebrated by drinking champagne from test tubes, a rare departure from the humility and frugality that characterized the atmosphere of Fundación Instituto Campomar under Leloir's direction. The $80,000 prize money was spent directly on research, and when asked about the significance of his achievement, Leloir responded:

"This is only one step in a much larger project. I discovered (no, not me: my team) the function of sugar nucleotides in cell metabolism. I want others to understand this, but it is not easy to explain: this is not a very noteworthy deed, and we hardly know even a little."

==== Legacy ====
Leloir published a short autobiography, entitled "Long Ago and Far Away" in the 1983 Annual Review of Biochemistry. The title, Leloir claims, is derived from one of William Henry Hudson's novels that depicted the country wildlife and scenery of Leloir's childhood.

He died in Buenos Aires on December 2, 1987, of a heart attack soon after returning to his home from the laboratory, and is buried in La Recoleta Cemetery. Mario Bunge, a friend and colleague of Leloir, claims that his lasting legacy was proving that "scientific research on an international level, although precarious, was possible in an underdeveloped country in the middle of political strife" and credits Leloir's vigilance and will for his ultimate success. With his research in dire financial straits, Leloir often resorted to homemade gadgets and contraptions to continue his work in the laboratory. In one instance, Leloir reportedly used waterproof cardboard to create makeshift gutters in order to protect his laboratory's library from the rain.

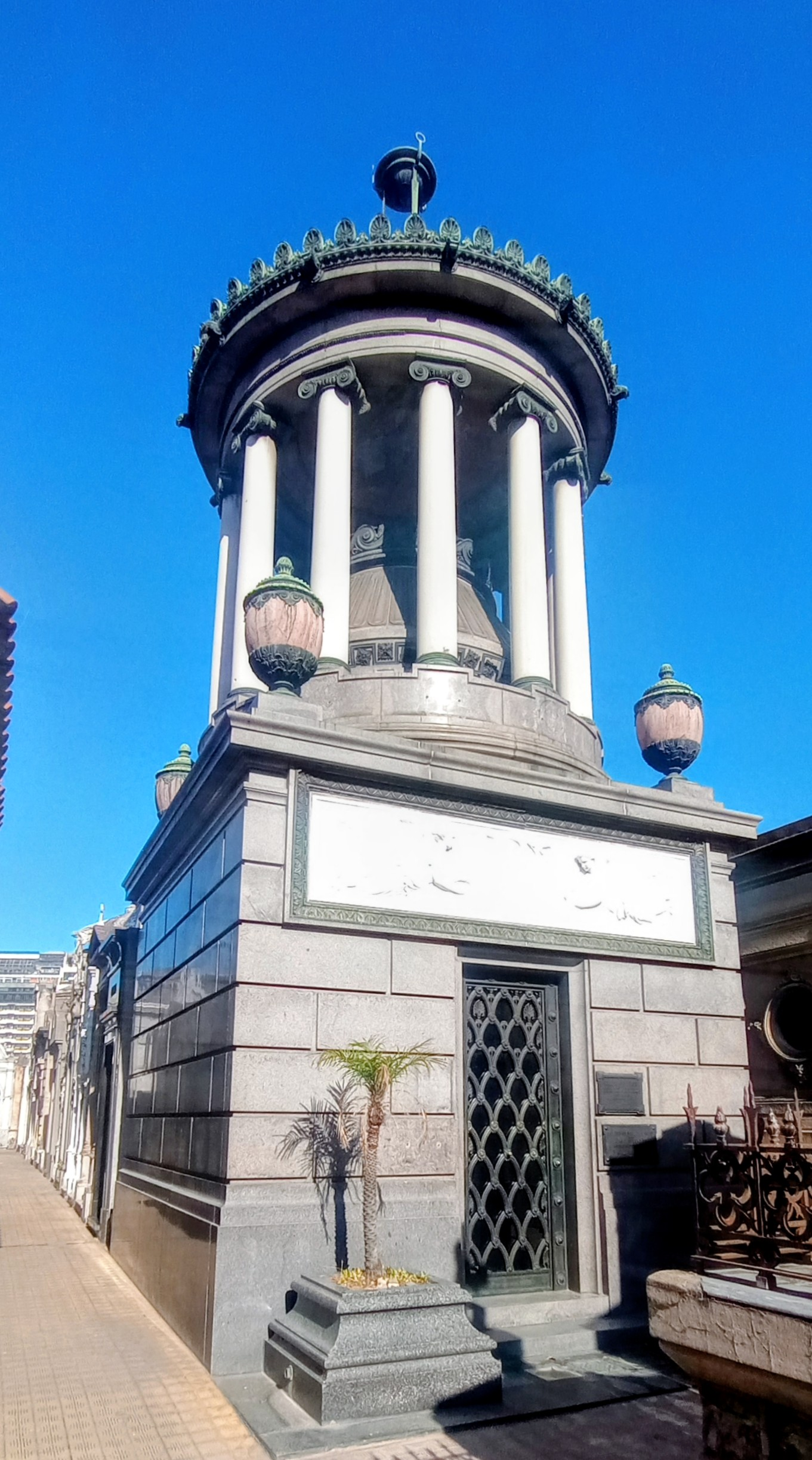
Leloir Family Mausoleum

Leloir was known for his humility, focus and consistency, described by many as a "true monk in science". Every morning his wife Amelia would drive him in their Fiat 600 and drop him off at 1719 Julián Alvarez Street, location of Fundación Instituto Campomar, with Leloir wearing the same worn out, gray overalls. He worked sitting on the same straw seat for decades and encouraged colleagues to eat lunch in the laboratory to save time, bringing enough meat stew to share with everyone. Indeed, despite Leloir's frugality and extreme dedication to his research, he was a sociable man, claiming not to like working alone.

The Fundación Instituto Campomar has since been renamed Fundación Instituto Leloir, and has grown to become a 21,000 sq ft (2,000 m^{2}) building with 20 senior researchers, 42 technicians and administrative personnel, 8 post doctorate fellows, and 20 Ph.D. candidates. The institute conducts research in a variety of fields, including Alzheimer's disease, Parkinson's disease, and multiple sclerosis.

== Awards and distinctions ==
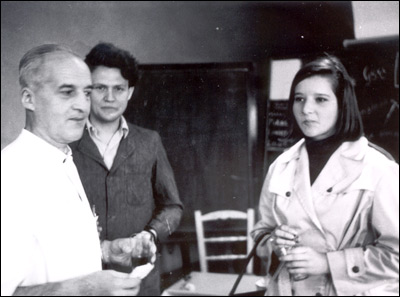
Leloir (left) with Armando Parodi and his daughter Amelia in the laboratory.

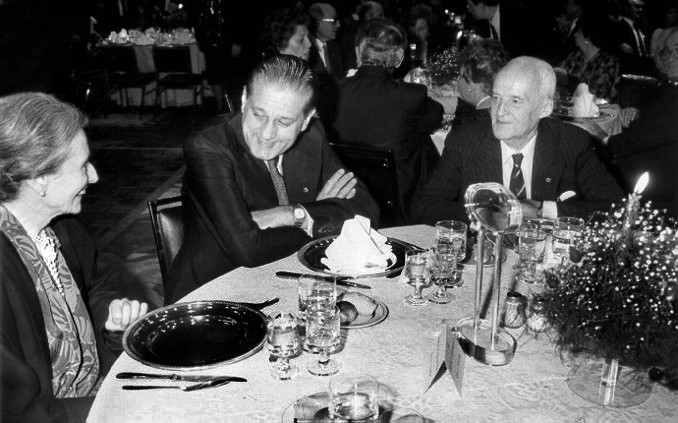
Leloir with his wife Amelia and cardiac surgeon René Favaloro.

Year	Distinction
1943	Third National Science Award
1958	T. Ducett Jones Memorial Award
1960	Elected an International Member of the U.S. National Academy of Sciences
1961	Elected to the American Academy of Arts and Sciences
1963	Elected an International Member of the American Philosophical Society
1965	Bunge and Born Foundation Award
1966	Gairdner Foundation Award
1967	Columbia University's Louisa Gross Horwitz Prize
1968	Benito Juárez Award
1968	Honorary Doctorate from Universidad Nacional de Córdoba
1968	Argentina Chemistry Association's Juan José Jolly Kyle Award
1969	Honorary member of the English Biochemical Society
1970	Nobel Prize in Chemistry
1971	Legion de Honor “Orden de Andrés Bello”
1972	Elected a Foreign Member of the Royal Society (ForMemRS) in 1972
1976	Grand Cross of the Order of Bernardo O'Higgins (Chile)
1982	Legion of Honour
1983	Diamond Konex Award: Science and Technology

== Bibliography ==
- Lorenzano, Julio César. Por los caminos de Leloir. Editorial Biblos; 1a edition, July 1994. ISBN 9-5078-6063-0
- Zuberbuhler de Leloir, Amelia. Retrato personal de Leloir. Vol. 8, No. 25, pp. 45–46, 1983.
- Nachón, Carlos Alberto. Luis Federico Leloir: ensayo de una biografía. Bank Foundation of Boston, 1994.
