= Saavedra Lamas Treaty =

1933 multilateral treaty

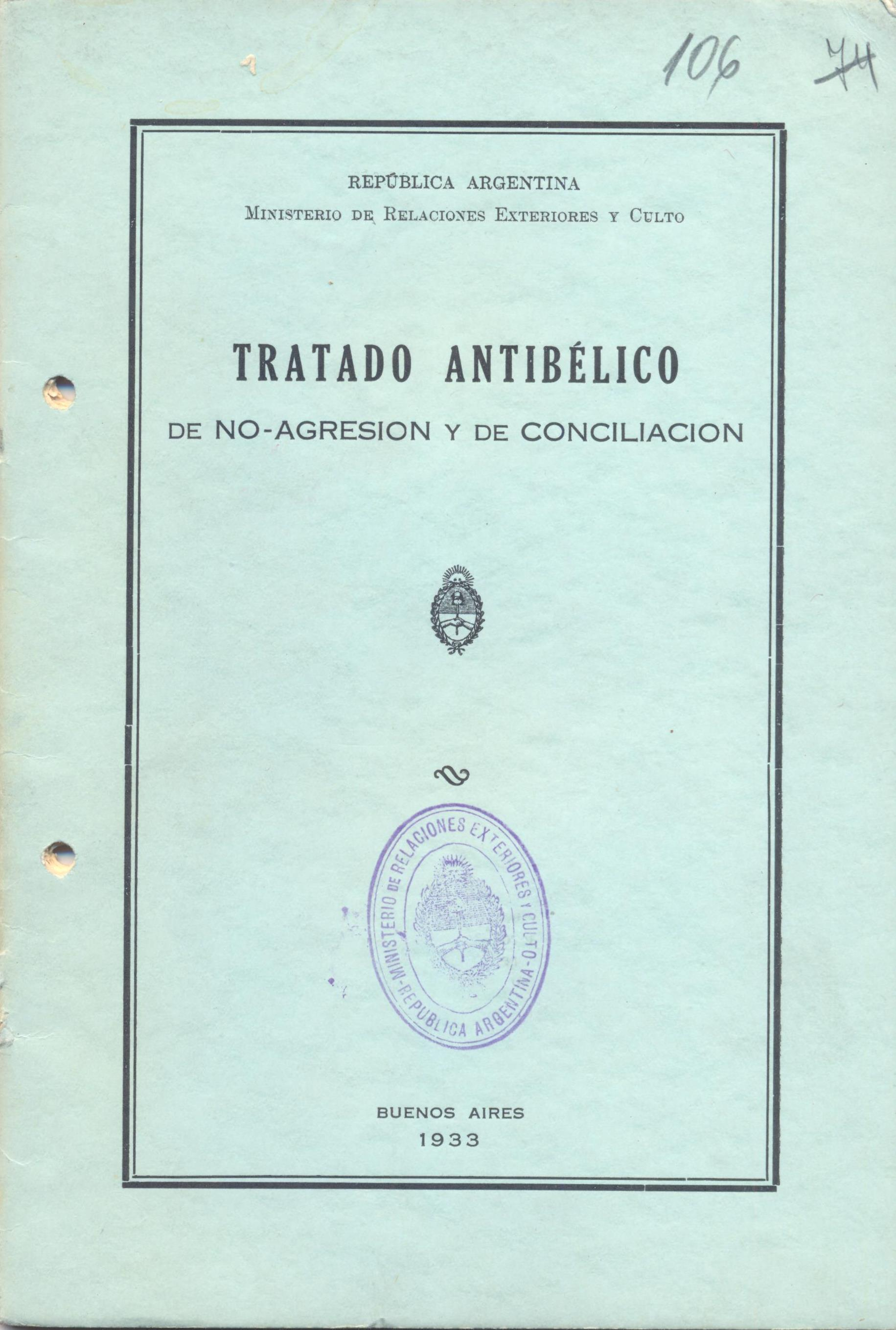
Saavedra Lamas Treaty

The Anti-war Treaty of Non-aggression and Conciliation (also known as Saavedra Lamas Treaty) was an inter-American treaty signed in Rio de Janeiro on October 10, 1933. It was the brain-child of Carlos Saavedra Lamas, who was the Argentine Minister of Foreign Affairs at the time the treaty was concluded. It was signed by representatives of Argentina, Brazil, Chile, Mexico, Paraguay and Uruguay. The US government acceded to the treaty on August 10, 1934. The treaty went into effect on November 13, 1935. It was registered in League of Nations Treaty Series on November 28, 1935.

The treaty was terminated with the entry into effect of the Pact of Bogotá, concluded on April 30, 1948 (article 58).

The treaty had a persistent impact on norms related to peace and conflict in the Western hemisphere.

== Text of the treaty ==
=== Article 1 ===
The high contracting parties solemnly declare that they condemn wars of aggression in their mutual relations or in those with other states, and that the settlement of disputes or controversies of any kind that may arise among them shall be effected only by the pacific means which have the sanction of international law.

=== Article 2 ===
They declare that as between the high contracting parties territorial questions must not be settled by violence, and that they will not recognize any territorial arrangement which is not obtained by pacific means, nor the validity of the occupation or acquisition of territories that may be brought about by force of arms.

=== Article 3 ===
In case of noncompliance, by any state engaged in a dispute, with the obligations contained in the foregoing articles, the contracting states undertake to make every effort for the maintenance of peace. To that end they will adopt in their character as neutrals a common and solidary attitude; they will exercise the political, juridical, or economic means authorized by international law; they will bring the influence of public opinion to bear, but will in no case resort to intervention, either diplomatic or armed; subject to the attitude that may be incumbent on them by virtue of other collective treaties to which such states are signatories.

=== Article 4 ===
The high contracting parties obligate themselves to submit to the conciliation procedure established by this treaty the disputes specially mentioned and any others that may arise in their reciprocal relations, without further limitations than those enumerated in the following article, in all controversies which it has not been possible to settle by diplomatic means within a reasonable period of time.

=== Article 5 ===
The high contracting parties and the states which may in the future adhere to this treaty may not formulate, at the time of signature, ratification, or adherence, other limitations to the conciliation procedure than those which are indicated below:

(a) Differences for the solution of which treaties, conventions, pacts, or pacific agreements of any kind whatever may have been concluded, which in no case shall be considered as annulled by this agreement, but supplemented thereby insofar as they tend to assure peace; as well as the questions or matters settled by previous treaties;

(b) Disputes which the parties prefer to solve by direct settlement or submit by common agreement to an arbitral or judicial solution;

(c) Questions which international law leaves to the exclusive competence of each state, under its constitutional system, for which reason the parties may object to their being submitted to the conciliation procedure before the national or local jurisdiction has decided definitively; except in the case of manifest denial or delay of justice, in which case the conciliation procedure shall be initiated within a year at the latest;

(d) Matters which affect constitutional precepts of the parties to the controversy. In case of doubt, each party shall obtain the reasoned opinion of its respective tribunal or supreme court of justice, if the latter should be invested with such powers.

The high contracting parties may communicate, at any time and in the manner provided for by article XV, an instrument stating that they have abandoned wholly or in part the limitations established by them in the conciliation procedure.

The effect of the limitations formulated by one of the contracting parties shall be that the other parties shall not consider themselves obligated in regard to that party save in the measure of the exceptions established.

=== Article 6 ===
In the absence of a permanent conciliation commission or of some other international organization charged with this mission by virtue of previous treaties in effect, the high contracting parties undertake to submit their differences to the examination and investigation of a conciliation commission which shall be formed as follows, unless there is an agreement to the contrary of the parties in each case:

The conciliation commission shall consist of five members. Each party to the controversy shall designate a member, who may be chosen by it from among its own nationals. The three remaining members shall be designated by common agreement by the parties from among the nationals of third powers, who must be of different nationalities, must not have their customary residence in the territory of the interested parties, nor be in the service of any of them. The parties shall choose the president of the conciliation commission from among the said three members.

If they cannot arrive at an agreement with regard to such designations, they may entrust the selection thereof to a third power or to some other existing international organism. If the candidates so designated are rejected by the parties or by any one of them, each party shall present a list of candidates equal in number to that of the members to be selected, and the names of those to sit on the conciliation commission shall be determined by lot.

=== Article 7 ===
The tribunals or supreme courts of justice which, in accordance with the domestic legislation of each state, may be competent to interpret, in the last or the sole instance and in matters under their respective jurisdiction, the constitution, treaties, or the general principles of the law of nations, may be designated preferentially by the high contracting parties to discharge the duties entrusted by the present treaty to the conciliation commission. In this case the tribunal or court may function as a whole or may designate some of its members to proceed alone or by forming a mixed commission with members of other courts or tribunals, as may be agreed upon by common accord between the parties to the dispute.

=== Article 8 ===
The conciliation commission shall establish its own rules of procedure, which shall provide in all cases for hearing both sides.

The parties to the controversy may furnish, and the commission may require from them, all the antecedents and information necessary. The parties may have themselves represented by delegates and assisted by advisers or experts, and also present evidence of all kinds.

=== Article 9 ===
The labors and deliberations of the conciliation commission shall not be made public except by a decision of its own to that effect, with the assent of the parties.

In the absence of stipulation to the contrary, the decisions of the commission shall be made by a majority vote, but the commission may not pronounce judgment on the substance of the case except in the presence of all its members.

=== Article 10 ===
It is the duty of the commission to secure the conciliatory settlement of the disputes submitted to its consideration.

After an impartial study of the questions in dispute, it shall set forth in a report the outcome of its work and shall propose to the parties bases of settlement by means of a just and equitable solution.

The report of the commission shall in no case have the character of a final decision or arbitral award either with respect to the exposition or interpretation of the facts, or with regard to the considerations or conclusions of law.

=== Article 11 ===
The conciliation commission must present its report within 1 year, counting from its first meeting, unless the parties should decide by common agreement to shorten or extend this period.

The conciliation procedure, having been once begun, may be interrupted only by a direct settlement between the parties or by their subsequent decision to submit the dispute by common accord to arbitration or to international justice.

=== Article 12 ===
In communicating its report to the parties, the conciliation commission shall fix for them a period, which shall not exceed 6 months, within which they must decide as to the bases of the settlement it has proposed. On the expiration of this term, the commission shall record in a final act the decision of the parties.

This period having expired without acceptance of the settlement by the parties, or the adoption by common accord of another friendly solution, the parties to the dispute shall regain their freedom of action to proceed as they may see fit within the limitations flowing from articles I and II of this treaty.

=== Article 13 ===
From the initiation of the conciliatory procedure until the expiration of the period fixed by the commission for the parties to make a decision, they must abstain from any measure prejudicial to the execution of the agreement that may be proposed by the commission and' in general, from any act capable of aggravating or prolonging the controversy.

=== Article 14 ===
During the conciliation procedure the members of the commission shall receive honoraria the amount of which shall be established by common agreement by the parties to the controversy. Each of them shall bear its own expenses and a moiety of the joint expenses or honoraria.

=== Article 15 ===
The present treaty shall be ratified by the high contracting parties as soon as possible, in accordance with their respective constitutional procedures.

The original treaty and the instruments of ratification shall be deposited in the Ministry of Foreign Relations and Worship of the Argentine Republic, which shall communicate the ratifications to the other signatory states. The treaty shall go into effect between the high contracting parties 30 days after the deposit of the respective ratifications. and in the order in which they are effected.

=== Article 16 ===
This treaty shall remain open to the adherence of all states.

Adherence shall be effected by the deposit of the respective instrument in the Ministry of Foreign Relations and Worship of the Argentine Republic, which shall give notice thereof to the other interested states.

=== Article 17 ===
The present treaty is concluded for an indefinite time, but may be denounced by 1 year's notice, on the expiration of which the effects thereof shall cease for the denouncing state, and remain in force for the other states which are parties thereto, by signature or adherence.

The denunciation shall be addressed to the Ministry of Foreign Relations and Worship of the Argentine Republic, which shall transmit it to the other interested states.

== Reactions to the treaty ==
US Supreme Court Justice Robert H. Jackson, in a speech delivered before the Inter-American Bar Association on March 27, 1941, referred to the Anti-War treaty as "one of the most important American contributions to the growth of the law in the last decade".
