= Teodosio César Brea =

Argentine Lawyer

Teodosio César Brea (4 December 1927 – 12 June 2018) was an Argentine lawyer. Brea obtained his law degree from the “Universidad de Buenos Aires” in 1950 and a Master in Comparative Jurisprudence from the New York University School of Law in 1954. He validated his law degree at the “Universidad Complutense de Madrid” and was admitted to the bar in Spain in 1976.

== Early life ==
Teodosio César Brea was born in Buenos Aires on 4 December 1927. He attended the University of Buenos Aires, graduating from law school in 1950. He then attended New York University, taking a master's degree in comparative jurisprudence in 1953. In 1955, he was appointed professor of constitutional law at the University of Buenos Aires and helped to devise the present political studies programme in the School of Law.

== Career ==
Brea founded the firm Allende & Brea, one of the biggest law firms in Argentina. The law firm was founded together with Juan Martín Allende in 1957 for the practice of international and corporate law in his home country (the law firm was the first in Buenos Aires to follow the model of U.S. law firms). In the 1970s, he expanded the practice to Spain and the United States (the law firm used to have an office in New York and another one in Florida).

Brea was assistant professor of constitutional law at the Universidad de Buenos Aires for ten years (1955-1965).

Brea was member of the Bar Association of the City of Buenos Aires; The Association of the Bar of the City of New York; Royal Bar Association of Madrid; The American Society of International Law; American Foreign Law Association; Inter-American Bar Association; and the International Bar Association.

Brea was the chairman of the National Park Service of Argentina (1966-1970); chairman of Fundación Vida Silvestre Argentina; vice-chairman and trustee of the World Wild Fund for Nature (WWF) (1982-1995); vice-chairman of the advisory board and Comparative Law Center of the Southwestern Legal Foundation, Dallas.

Brea played an active part in the creation of several non-governmental organizations, such as Fundación Bariloche (1962), Fundación Invertir (1993) and Fundación Vida Silvestre Argentina (1977).

Apart from being a founding member of a law firm in Buenos Aires, Brea also devoted much of his time to a major conservation agency, the Fundación Vida Silvestre Argentina.

From 1965, Brea was increasingly active in conservation in Argentina. His early efforts resulted in the passing of new legislation covering the management of natural areas in Argentina. In 1968, he founded the National Ranger School for the training of specialized personnel in conservation; even today, this is still only one of four centres of its type active in the world.

Brea was also one of the founders of the Fundación Vida Silvestre Argentina where he served as secretary until 1987. The Fundación has developed into the most active non-governmental organization in this field in Argentina and one of the leading institutions of its type in Latin America.

== Death ==
Teodosio César Brea died in Buenos Aires on 12 June 2018, at the age of 90.

== Links ==
- Allende y Brea medio siglo de un estudio jurídico innovador, Diario La Nación del 10 de septiembre de 2007.
- Allende Brea expande su area de influencia a Miami, Diario La Nación del 12 de junio de 2002
- Teodosio Brea 1990 Jury member of The Rolex Awards for Enterprise
