= Leloir Institute =

Argentine research institute

Coordinates: 34°36′15″S 58°26′03″W

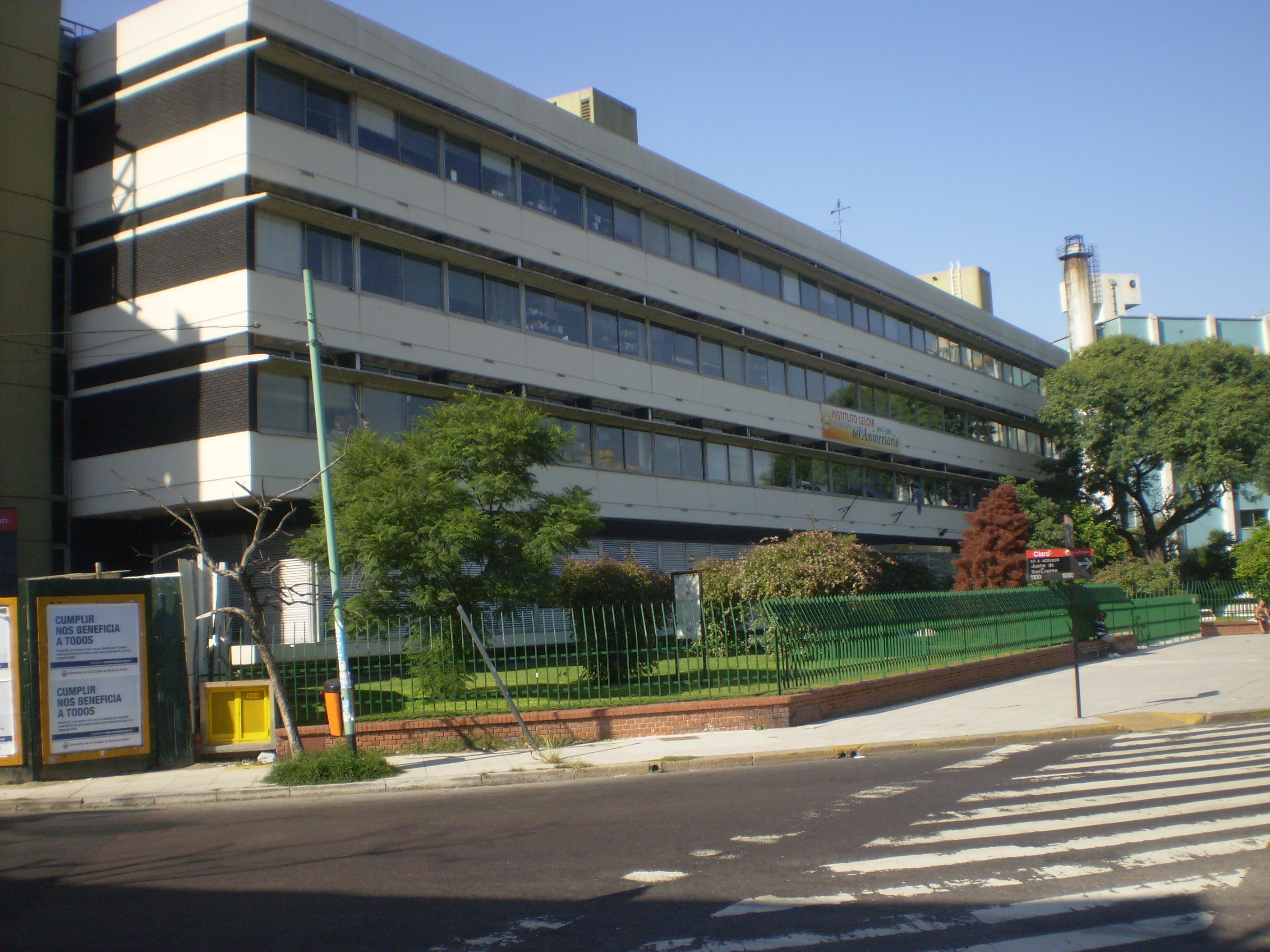
The Leloir Institute, designed by Architect, Mario Roberto Álvarez.

The Leloir Institute is a non-profit research center in Buenos Aires specializing in biochemistry, cellular biology, molecular biology, and related activities.

== Overview ==
The research center was inaugurated in 1947 by way of an initiative of University of Buenos Aires Physiology Professors Bernardo Houssay and Luis Leloir. The project was funded by the philanthropic support of local textile industrialist Jaime Campomar, and Dr. Houssay devoted a share of the proceeds from the Nobel Prize in Physiology he earned that year to the establishment of the institute. Initially located in a Belle Époque building in the Palermo section of Buenos Aires, the institute was first directed by Dr. Leloir and, following Campomar's death in 1956, it became a recipient of an endowment from both the Rockefeller Institute and the National Institutes of Health, both in the United States. The institute was formally named the Campomar Institute of Research in Biochemistry in 1958, when it was relocated to a utilitarian building belonging to the city's health ministry in the Belgrano section, nearby.

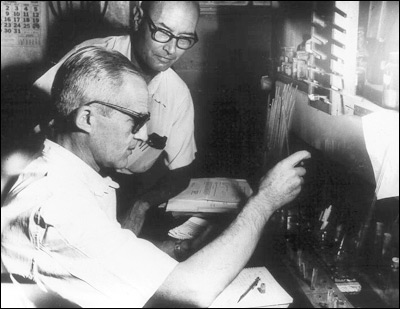
Drs. Luis Leloir (left) and Carlos Cardini at work in the institute's former facilities (1960).

Dr. Leloir's work at the institute on nucleotides and their role in human metabolic pathways earned him the 1970 Nobel Prize in Physiology. This became known as “Leloir's pathway” and was a significant advance for biochemistry. As a consequence of this 1957 discovery, the cause of a congenital disease called galactosemia was first identified; not detected in time, it can cause mental retardation, cataracts and cirrhosis. Numerous other colleagues of his at the institute became well known in their fields, as well. These have included Enrico Cabib, Carlos Cardini, Ranwell Caputto, Alejandro Paladini, and Raúl Trucco, among others. The continued support of the Campomar Foundation allowed the institute to relocate to its current facilities in 1983.

Located in the Caballito section of the city and facing Parque Centenario, the new facilities total over 6,900 m² (74,000 ft²) and include laboratories, teaching facilities, an auditorium and the National Biochemistry Reference Library. It was renamed the Leloir Institute in recognition of its longtime director (who died in 1987), in 2001. That year, the center initiated its program of "repatriation of researchers," in a bid to both incorporate new scientific staff, as well as to help reverse the long-standing brain drain suffered by the Argentine scientific community.

The center maintains numerous cooperation agreements with not only prominent local research centers such as the CONICET and University of Buenos Aires School of Exact Sciences; but also respected international centers, such as Partners Harvard Medical International, the Howard Hughes Medical Institute, Inis Biotech, and the Weizmann Institute. It hosts 24 research teams and 170 scientists, whose varied specialties include neuroscience, cellular biology, oncology, gene therapy, epidemiology, biotechnology and structural biology; among its associated fellows is the recipient of 1984 Nobel Prize in Physiology, Dr. César Milstein. Construction started on the institute's new annex in 2007, consisting of 2,900 m² (31,000 ft²) of space for imaging, as well as for expanded research on cell cultures and biophysics. These investments continue the Leloir Institute's tradition as a leader in science and technology in Argentina.
