= Caro De Robertis =

American novelist

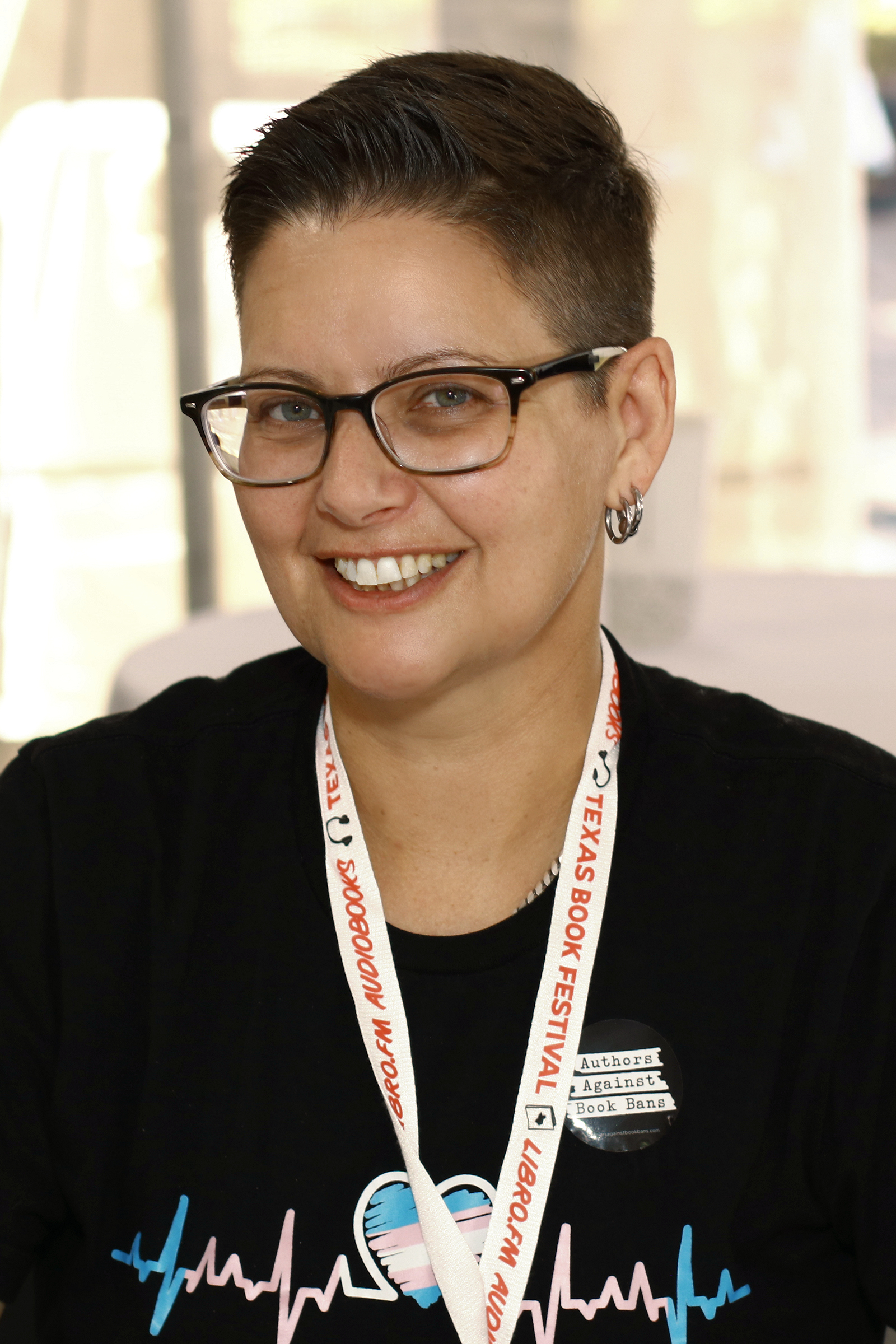
- De Robertis at the 2024 Texas Book Festival.
- Born: Carolina De Robertis; 1975 (age 50–51); England
- Citizenship: American
- Education: University of California, Los Angeles (BA); Mills College at Northeastern University (MFA)
- Occupation: Author
- Writing career
- Language: English, Spanish
- Notable works: The Invisible Mountain (2010); Perla (2013); The Gods of Tango (2015); Radical Hope (2017); Cantoras (2019)
- Notable awards: Rhegium Julii Debut Prize (2010); Stonewall Book Award (2016)
- Website: carolinaderobertis.com

Caro De Robertis (born 1975) is an Uruguayan–American author and professor of creative writing at San Francisco State University. They are the author of six novels and a nonfiction book, and the editor of an award-winning anthology, Radical Hope (2017), which include essays by such writers as Junot Díaz and Jane Smiley. They are also well known for their translation work, frequently translating Spanish pieces.

== Early life ==
Caro De Robertis was born in England in 1975 to Uruguayan parents. Their father, Edward De Robertis, is a noted embryologist. At the time of their birth, Edward was studying postdoctoral training at the MRC Laboratory of Molecular Biology under Sir John Gurdon after completing his undergraduate and graduate studies in Uruguay and Argentina, whereas their grandfather, Eduardo De Robertis, was an Argentine physician and biologist. De Robertis is of paternal Italian descent, with their great–grandfather (Eduardo's father) hailing from Prepezzano [it], a hamlet in Giffoni Sei Casali, located in the province of Salerno of the Campania region.

During their childhood, De Robertis moved across the world on several occasions following Edward's scientific career, starting in England, then moving to Basel, until finally settling in the United States, first in Pacific Palisades, Los Angeles where they graduated from Palisades High School, and eventually to Oakland.

At the age of 19, De Robertis came out as bisexual, which they have described as the beginning of the process of their parents disowning them, which was complete by the time they were 25. Describing their relationship with their parents, they said that "they actually dug in their heels and tried to turn my siblings against my first child when I was pregnant with the first child. I use that example to say, it's not true that everybody comes around."

De Robertis received a Bachelor of Arts in English literature from the University of California, Los Angeles in 1996. They worked as a rape counselor and were active in the Bay Area's LGBTQ+ community in their 20s. They received a Master of Fine Arts degree in creative writing from Mills College in 2007.

== Career ==
De Robertis released their first book, The Invisible Mountain, in 2009. The novel was an international best-seller, and was translated into 17 languages. It was selected as one of the best books of the year by the San Francisco Chronicle, O, The Oprah Magazine, and Booklist. It was a finalist for a California Book Award, an International Latino Book Award, and the VCU Cabell First Novelist Award.

De Robertis' 2019 novel, Cantoras, is set in 1970s Uruguay. Its five protagonists are lesbians. The book was selected as a New York Times Editors' Choice. It won a Stonewall Book Award and a Reading Women Award, and was a finalist for the Kirkus Prize for Fiction and Lambda Literary Award for Lesbian Fiction. In 2021, their novel The President and the Frog was published. The character of the President in the book is heavily influenced by José Mujica, the former President of Uruguay. Writing in The Nation, Lily Meyer said that the book, "asks its readers to think seriously about the weight of taking political action, then suggests that they take it."

In 2022, De Robertis became the 41st recipient of the Dos Passos Prize, awarded annually to an American author who American "experiments with form, explores a range of voices and deserves more recognition."

Their sixth novel, The Palace of Eros, was a finalist for the 2025 Lambda Literary Award for Speculative Fiction.

Their non-fiction oral history, So Many Stars, was released in May 2025. That same year, they published the essay "Gender Euphoria is a Power Source" for the anthology Both/And: Essays by Trans and Gender-Nonconforming Writers of Color, edited by Denne Michele Norris with Electric Literature. The collection became a finalist for the 2026 Lambda Literary Award for Transgender Nonfiction.

== Personal life ==
De Robertis currently resides with their two children in Oakland, California. They identify as queer and genderqueer. Describing their sexuality on the LGBTQ&A podcast, De Robertis said, "The more words the better. So I'm a dyke, I'm a lesbian... It's all good." De Robertis uses they/them pronouns.

== Works ==
=== Novels ===
- The Invisible Mountain (2009)
- Perla (2012)
- The Gods of Tango (2015)
- Cantoras (2019)
- The President and the Frog (2021)
- The Palace of Eros (2024)

=== Non-fiction ===
- So Many Stars: An Oral History of Trans, Nonbinary, Genderqueer, and Two-Spirit People of Color (2025)

=== Essays ===
- "42 Poorly Kept Secrets About Montevideo" (2006) for the Indiana Review
- De Robertis, Caro (2025). "Gender Euphoria is a Power Source". In Norris, Denne Michele; Electric Literature (eds.). Both/And: Essays by Trans and Gender-Nonconforming Writers of Color. ISBN 978-0-06341-437-2.
- "Translating a Pablo Neruda Mystery" (2012) for Publishers Weekly
- "We Need the Real, Racist Atticus Finch" (2015) for the San Francisco Chronicle Book Review
- "Why We Must Listen to Women" (2017) for the East Bay Express

=== Short fiction ===
- "The Askers" (2009) for the Virginia Quarterly Review
- "On the Brink of Words" (2009) for the 580 Split
- "For Orlando" (2016) for the San Francisco Chronicle
- "The Tango Police" (2017) for CNET's Technically Literate Series

=== Edited works ===
- Radical Hope (2017)

=== Translated works ===
- "Trans: A Love Story" by Gabriela Wiener (2007)
- Bonsai by Alejandro Zambra (2008)
- "I Never Went to Blanes" by Diego Trelles Paz (2010)
- The Neruda Case by Roberto Ampuero (2012)
- "Tripych" by Raquel Lubartowski (2017)

== Honors and awards ==
=== Honors and scholarships ===
- 2012 Fellowship from the National Endowment for the Arts

=== Literary Awards ===
Year	Title	Award	Category	Result	Ref.
2010	The Invisible Mountain	California Book Award	First Fiction	Finalist	
2010	The Invisible Mountain	First Novelist Award	—	Finalist	
2010	The Invisible Mountain	Rhegium Julii Prize	Debut	Won	
2016	The Gods of Tango	Stonewall Book Award	Barbara Gittings Literature Award	Won	
2019	Cantoras	Kirkus Prize	Fiction	Finalist	
2019	Cantoras	Reading Women Award	Fiction	Won	
2020	Cantoras	Lambda Literary Awards	Lesbian Fiction	Finalist	
2020	Cantoras	Stonewall Book Award	Barbara Gittings Literature Award	Won	
2022	The President and the Frog	PEN/Faulkner Award for Fiction	—	Finalist	
2022	The President and the Frog	PEN/Jean Stein Book Award	—	Longlisted	
2022	—	Dos Passos Prize	—	Won	
2025	The Palace of Eros	Lambda Literary Award	Speculative Fiction	Finalist	
