= Eduardo De Robertis =

Argentinian physician and biologist (1913–1988)

Eduardo D. P. De Robertis (11 December 1913 – 31 May 1988) was an Argentine physician and biologist. He had a long and prolific scientific career, and was a co-discoverer of cell microtubules in 1953.

De Robertis was the son of an Italian immigrant and his son Edward M. De Robertis is also a noted biologist.. His granddaughter Caro De Robertis is an author and professor of creative writing at San Francisco State University.

In 1981, De Robertis became a founding member of the World Cultural Council.
