= El Litoral =

Local newspaper published in Santa Fe, Argentina

- Type: Daily newspaper
- Format: Tabloid
- Publisher: Nahuel Caputto
- Founded: 1918
- Headquarters: Santa Fe, Argentina
- Circulation: 20,000
- Website: El Litoral

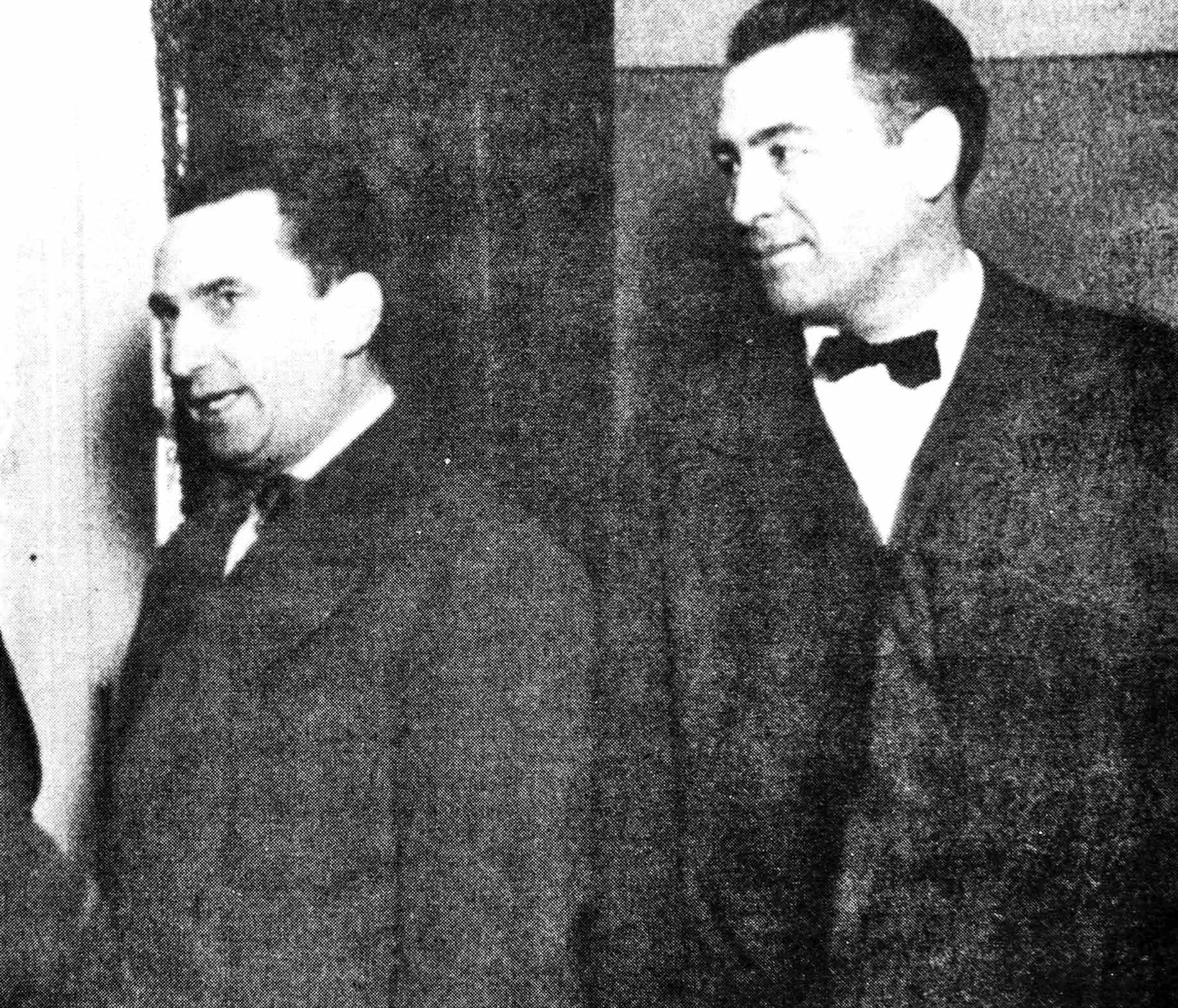
Salvador Caputto and Pedro Vittori (1937)

El Litoral (Spanish pronunciation: [el litoˈɾal]) is a local newspaper published in Santa Fe, Argentina.

El Litoral was founded by Salvador Caputto in the important Paraná River port city of Santa Fe, and first published on August 7, 1918.

The daily was edited for much of the twentieth century by Pedro Vittori, after whom the avenue its headquarters are located on was named.

Directed by Nahuel Caputto since 2016, it remains that city's most important daily newspaper.
