= Carlos Saavedra Lamas =

Argentine academic and politician

Carlos Saavedra Lamas TOSD
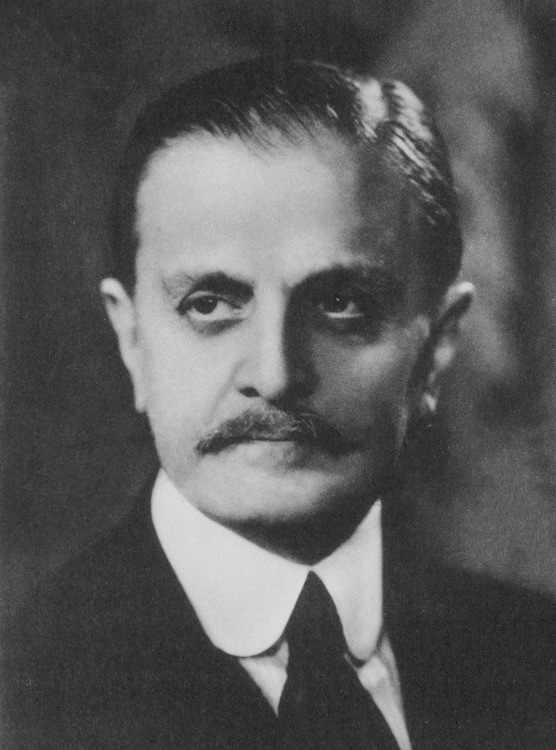

Rector of the University of Buenos Aires
- In office 17 October 1941 – 30 July 1943
- Preceded by: Coriolano Alberini
- Succeeded by: Alfredo Labougle

Minister of Foreign Affairs and Worship
- In office 20 February 1932 – 20 February 1938
- President: Agustín P. Justo
- Preceded by: Adolfo Bioy
- Succeeded by: José María Cantilo

Minister of Justice and Public Instruction
- In office 20 August 1915 – 12 October 1916
- President: Victorino de la Plaza
- Preceded by: Tomás R. Cullen
- Succeeded by: José Santos Salinas

National Deputy
- In office 12 October 1908 – 25 August 1915
- Constituency: Buenos Aires (1912–1915); City of Buenos Aires (1908–1912)

Personal details
- Born: 1 November 1878 Buenos Aires, Argentina
- Died: 5 May 1959 (aged 80) Buenos Aires, Argentina
- Party: National Autonomist Party (until 1916); National Democratic Party (1931–1959) (Note: Spanish Wikipedia gives a different and more detailed party history: Partido Autonomista (1907–1909), Unión Nacional (1909–1912), Partido Conservador (1912–1916), and Partido Demócrata Nacional (1931–1943). Neither version carries an inline citation, and the discrepancy has not been independently resolved.)
- Education: University of Buenos Aires
- Occupation: Politician, academic
- Awards: Nobel Peace Prize (1936); Legion of Honour

Carlos Saavedra Lamas (1 November 1878 – 5 May 1959) was an Argentine academic and politician who served as Argentina's foreign minister from 1932 to 1938. A legal scholar specializing in labor legislation and international law, he also served as rector of the University of Buenos Aires. As foreign minister, he drafted the 1933 Treaty of Nonaggression and Conciliation and helped mediate an end to the Chaco War between Bolivia and Paraguay, work for which he was awarded the 1936 Nobel Peace Prize, becoming the first Latin American recipient of the prize.

== Biography ==
Saavedra Lamas was born in Buenos Aires into a family descended from an early Argentine patriot, and he later married a daughter of Argentine president Roque Sáenz Peña. He became known both as a scholar of labor legislation and international law and, later, as Argentina's foreign minister, where he was credited with drafting international agreements and leading diplomatic mediation efforts.

He studied at Lacordaire College before entering the University of Buenos Aires Faculty of Law, where he earned a doctorate in law summa cum laude in 1903. After further study in Paris, he took a professorship in law and constitutional history at the University of La Plata, beginning a teaching career that spanned more than four decades. He later introduced a sociology course at the University of Buenos Aires, taught political economy and constitutional law in its law school, and eventually became its rector.

As an academic, Saavedra Lamas specialized in labor legislation and international law. He edited several works on labor law, including Centro de legislación social y del trabajo (1927), Traités internationaux de type social (1924), and the three-volume Código nacional del trabajo (1933). He supported the founding of the International Labour Organization in 1919 and, in 1928, presided over its Geneva conference while simultaneously leading the Argentine delegation. In international law, he published La Crise de la codification et de la doctrine argentine de droit international (1931) and wrote on subjects including asylum, colonization, immigration, arbitration, and international peace; his short book Vida internacional, written when he was seventy, drew on this body of work.

Saavedra Lamas entered public life in 1906 as director of public credit, becoming secretary-general of the municipality of Buenos Aires the following year. He was elected to Parliament in 1908 for two consecutive terms, sponsoring legislation on coastal water rights, irrigation, sugar production, government finance, colonization, and immigration, though his central interest lay in foreign affairs; he helped preserve Argentina's arbitration treaty with Italy during a crisis in 1907–1908 and became an informal adviser to the legislature and foreign ministry on international treaties. He was nonetheless a controversial figure, seen by many as an elitist patrician who was too conservative and who favored British intervention, particularly in railroad construction.

As minister of Justice and Public Instruction from 1915, he reorganized the branches of public education and developed an intermediate-level curriculum for vocational and technical training.

President Agustín P. Justo appointed him foreign minister in 1932, a post he held for six years. During this period Saavedra Lamas raised Argentina's international standing, took a leading part in South American diplomacy, brought Argentina back into the League of Nations after a thirteen-year absence, and represented the country at most major international conferences of the era.

His diplomacy was central to ending the Chaco War between Paraguay and Bolivia (1932–1935). On taking office he began working toward a negotiated settlement, and in 1932 initiated the Declaration of August 3 in Washington, by which American states agreed not to recognize territorial changes achieved by force. He then drafted the Treaty of Nonaggression and Conciliation, signed by six South American countries in October 1933 and by all American states two months later at the Seventh Pan-American Conference in Montevideo. In 1935 he arranged mediation by six neutral American countries that ended the fighting between Paraguay and Bolivia, having already presented the South American Antiwar Pact to the League of Nations in 1934, where eleven countries signed it. In recognition of this work, he was elected president of the Assembly of the League of Nations in 1936.

After leaving the foreign ministry in 1938, Saavedra Lamas returned to academic life, serving as rector of the University of Buenos Aires from 1941 to 1943 and continuing to teach there until 1946.

Contemporaries described him as a strict disciplinarian in office, an incisive debater, a gracious host, and a notably elegant dresser. Besides the Nobel Peace Prize, he received France's Grand Cross of the Legion of Honor, Czechoslovakia's Order of the White Lion, First Class, on 15 December 1936, and comparable honors from other countries.

He died in Buenos Aires in 1959, at the age of eighty, following a brain hemorrhage, and was buried at La Recoleta Cemetery.

In March 2014 his solid gold Nobel medal was put up for auction after being found in a South American pawn shop.

In August 2014 a project for rebuying his Nobel medal by the Argentine Nation was presented at the Argentine congress. His auctioned medal was later won and is now owned by a private Asian collector.
