= List of rectors of the University of Buenos Aires =

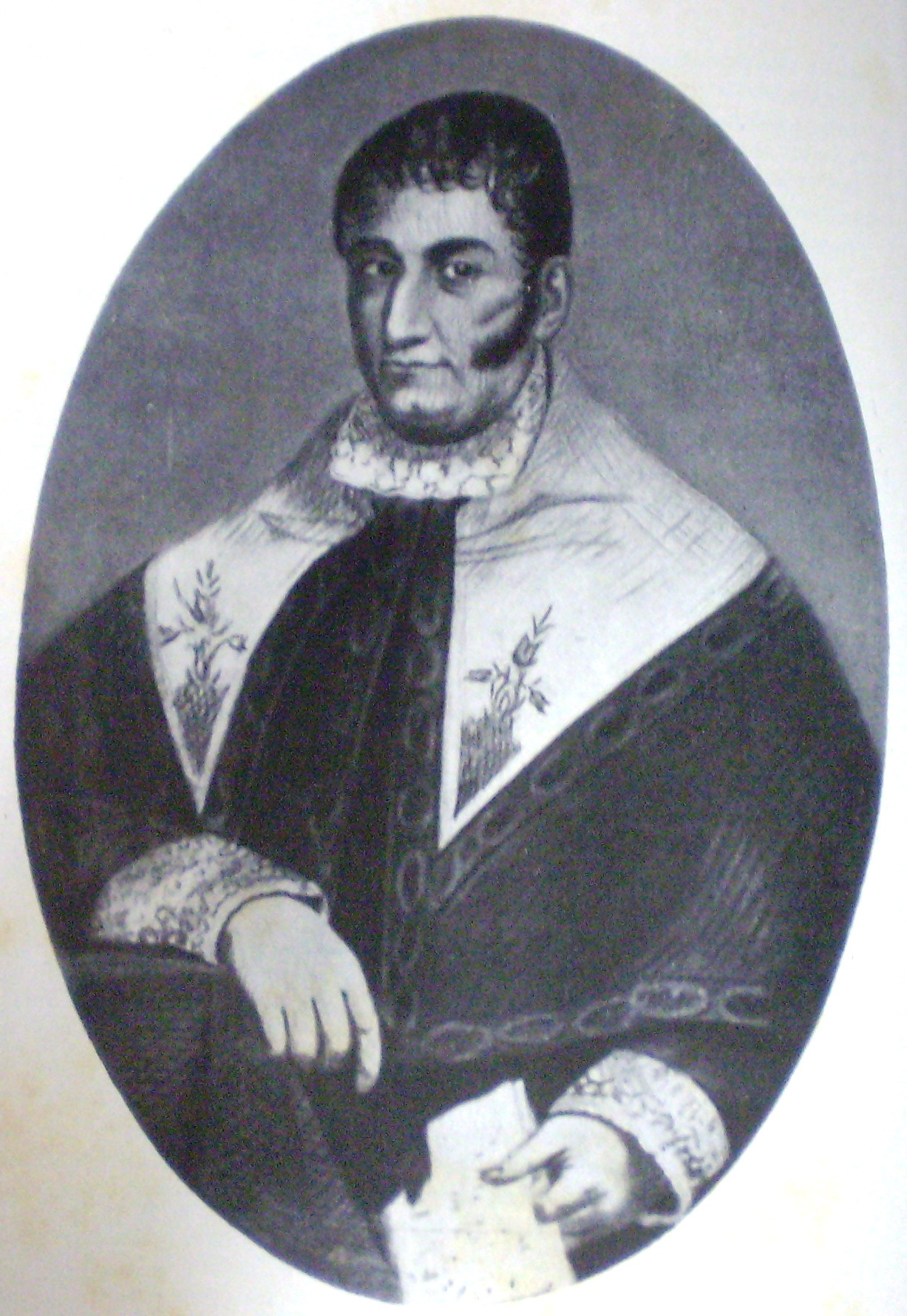
Antonio Sáenz, first rector of the University of Buenos Aires.

The following is a list of rectors of the University of Buenos Aires, the largest and most prestigious university in Argentina, since its establishment in 1821.

Since August 2022, the rector of UBA is Dr. Ricardo Gelpi, former Dean of the Faculty of Medical Sciences.

== List of rectors ==
Names in italics correspond to interventors appointed by the national government of Argentina.

N°	Rector	Term	Profession	Ref.
1	Antonio Sáenz	13 June 1821 – 25 July 1825	Cleric	
2	Valentín Gómez	10 April 1826 – 23 August 1830	Cleric	
3	Santiago Figueredo	23 August 1830 – 22 February 1832	Cleric	
4	Paulino Gari	13 December 1833 – November 1842	Cleric	
5	Miguel García	November 1849 – 26 June 1852	Cleric	
6	José Barros Pazos	12 July 1852 – 5 May 1857	Lawyer	
7	Antonio Cruz Obligado	9 May 1857 – March 1861	Lawyer	
8	Juan María Gutiérrez	1 April 1861 – 3 October 1873	Lawyer	
9	Vicente Fidel López	15 February 1874 – 12 June 1877	Lawyer	
10	Manuel Quintana	12 June 1877 – 26 January 1881	Lawyer	
11	Eufemio Uballes	1 March 1906 – 1 March 1922	Doctor	
12	José Arce	1 March 1922 – 1 March 1926	Doctor	
13	Ricardo Rojas	2 March 1926 – 1 March 1930	Journalist	
14	Enrique Butty	1 March 1930 – 11 December 1930	Engineer	
–	Benito Nazar Anchorena (Note: Appointed as interventor by the de facto government of José Félix Uriburu.)	16 December 1930 – 1 June 1931	Lawyer	
16	Mariano Rafael Castex	1 June 1931 – 9 March 1932	Doctor	
17	Ángel Gallardo	11 May 1932 – 9 April 1934	Engineer	
18	Vicente Gallo	11 May 1934 – 11 May 1941	Lawyer	
–	Coriolano Alberini (Note: Assumed office in interim fashion as vice rector.)	12 May 1941 – 16 October 1941	Philosophy	
19	Carlos Saavedra Lamas	17 October 1941 – 30 July 1943	Lawyer	
–	Alfredo Labougle	31 July 1943 – 1 November 1943	Economist	
–	Emilio Ravignani (Note: Appointed as interventor by the de facto government of Pedro Pablo Ramírez.)	2 November 1943 – 4 November 1943	Historian	
–	Tomás D. Casares	4 November 1943 – 9 March 1944	Lawyer	
–	David Arias	10 March 1944 – 18 May 1944	Lawyer	
–	Carlos Obligado	19 May 1944 – 31 August 1944	Writer	
–	Nicolás Matienzo (Note: Assumed office in interim fashion as secretary general of the university.)	1 September 1944 – 30 October 1944	Doctor	
–	Carlos Waldorp	30 October 1944 – 16 February 1945	Doctor	
–	Antonio J. Benítez (Note: Appointed as national commissioner by the de facto government of Edelmiro Farrell.)	17 February 1945 – 1 March 1945	Lawyer	
–	Salvador Oría	15 March 1945 – 26 April 1945	Lawyer	
20	Horacio Rivarola	27 April 1945 – 2 May 1946	Lawyer	
–	Nicolás Matienzo	2 May 1946 – 2 May 1946	Doctor	
–	Oscar Ivanissevich (Note: Appointed as interventor by the government of Juan Perón.)	4 May 1946 – 5 June 1949	Doctor	
21	Julio Otaola	6 June 1949 – 12 June 1952	Architect	
22	Carlos A. Bancalari	13 June 1952 – 16 October 1953	Doctor	
–	José Fernández Moreno	17 October 1953 – 3 November 1953	Lawyer	
23	Jorge A. Taiana	4 November 1953 – 3 June 1955	Doctor	
24	Ernesto Crámer	4 June 1955 – 31 July 1955	Lawyer	
25	Francisco Cholvis	1 August 1955 – 26 September 1955	Economist	
FUBA Provisional Government Board (27 September – 30 September 1955)				
–	José Luis Romero (Note: Appointed as interventor by the de facto government of Eduardo Lonardi)	1 October 1955 – 1 October 1955	Historian	
–	José Babini (Note: Appointed as interventor by the de facto government of Pedro Eugenio Aramburu.)	1 January 1956 – 19 February 1956	Engineer	
–	Alejandro Ceballos	5 May 1956 – 27 December 1957	Doctor	
26	Risieri Frondizi	27 December 1957 – 28 December 1962	Anthropologist	
27	Julio H. G. Olivera	28 December 1962 – 18 March 1965	Lawyer	
28	Hilario Fernández Long	26 March 1965 – 29 July 1966	Engineer	
29	Luis Botet	11 August 1966 – 7 February 1968	Lawyer	
30	Raúl A. Devoto	7 February 1968 – 24 July 1969	Doctor	
31	Andrés Santas	25 July 1969 – 21 July 1971	Doctor	
32	Bernabé J. Quartino	22 July 1971 – 29 January 1973	Geologist	
33	Carlos Alberto Durrieu	29 January 1973 – 29 May 1973	Doctor	
–	Rodolfo Puiggrós	29 May 1973 – 2 October 1973	Historian	
–	Alberto Banfi (Note: Never took office.)	2 October 1973 – 4 October 1973	Dentist	
–	Ernesto Villanueva (Note: Assumed office in interim fashion through commission.)	4 October 1973 – 28 March 1974	Sociologist	
–	Vicente Solano Lima (Note: Assumed office in interim fashion as normalizing rector.)	28 March 1974 – 25 July 1974	Lawyer	
–	Raúl Federico Laguzzi	25 July 1974 – 17 September 1974	Pharmacist	
–	Alberto Ottalagano (Note: Appointed as interventor by the government of Isabel Perón.)	17 September 1974 – 26 December 1974	Lawyer	
–	Eduardo Mangiante	27 August 1975 – 12 February 1976	Economist	
–	José Alocén	27 August 1975 – 12 February 1976	Accountant	
–	Edmundo E. Said (Note: Appointed as military delegate by the Junta.)	29 March 1976 – 6 August 1976	Navy officer	
34	Alberto Costantini	5 August 1976 – 14 September 1976	Engineer	
–	Sol Rabasa (Note: Assumed office in interim fashion as Secretary of Science and Technology.)	5 August 1976 – 14 September 1976	Doctor	
35	Luis Carlos Cabral	25 February 1977 – 31 August 1978	Lawyer	
–	Alberto V. Donnes (Note: Dean of the Faculty of Medicine acting as rector in interim fashion.)	31 August 1978 – 23 November 1978	Doctor	
36	Lucas Lennon (Note: Dean of the Faculty of Medicine acting as rector in interim fashion.)	25 November 1978 – 20 November 1981	Lawyer	
–	Alberto V. Donnes	20 November 1981 – 28 December 1981	Doctor	
37	Alberto Rodríguez Varela	28 December 1981 – 23 December 1982	Lawyer	
38	Carlos Segovia Fernández	27 December 1982 – 23 December 1983	Mathematician	
–	Francisco Delich	26 December 1983 – 19 March 1985	Sociologist	
39	Oscar Julio Shuberoff	19 March 1985 – 6 May 2002	Accountant	
40	Guillermo Jaim Etcheverry	6 May 2002 – 7 May 2006	Doctor	
–	Berardo Dujovne	7 May 2006 – 16 May 2006	Architect	
–	Alfredo Buzzi (Note: Dean of the Faculty of Medicine acting as rector in interim fashion. Assumed office following the institutional crisis of 2006, in which no rector was elected by the University Assembly.)	16 May 2006 – 18 December 2006	Architect	
41	Rubén Eduardo Hallú	18 December 2006 – 5 December 2013	Veterinarian	
42	Alberto Barbieri	5 December 2013 – 2 August 2022	Accountant	
43	Ricardo Gelpi	2 August 2022 – present	Doctor	
