= Cambalache =

Original tango written and composed by Enrique Santos Discépolo

- Sheet music cover, 1935.

Song by Enrique Santos Discépolo
- Language: Spanish (lunfardo, criollo)
- Written: 1934
- Genre: Tango
- Songwriter: Enrique Santos Discépolo

Cambalache (Southern Cone Spanish for junkshop) is an Argentine tango written in 1934 by Enrique Santos Discépolo for the movie El Alma del Bandoneón (1935).

It was banned by the General Office of Posts and Telegraphs in 1943 for its use of colloquial language. The ban was lifted by 1949; nonetheless, was banned again during the Dirty War by the de facto government due to its lyrics' "subversive scepticism".

== Development ==
In 1934, anarchist and porteño composer Enrique Santos Discépolo was commissioned to write several songs for the film El Alma del Bandoneón (The Soul of the Bandoneon). Discépolo was known for his lyrics that commented on Argentina's social and economic situation and, as scholar Donald S. Castro believed, the universal lament of the average citizen of Buenos Aires. Discépolo had previously planned a European tour, a continent where his compositions had become popular. During his preparations, he finished composing "Cambalache", a work that had taken many months to finish. Although Luis César Amadori had collaborated with him on various tracks, "Cambalache" was composed by Discépolo independently.

== Lyrics ==
In Argentine, Uruguayan, and Paraguayan Spanish, the term cambalache refers to a junk shop, a store that sells cheap second-hand goods; Discépolo opted to use a mix of colloquial speech (lunfardo and criollo) and Spanish's formal lexicon to make his lyrics more impactful. He had composed similar songs to "Cambalache" previously, such as "Qué vachaché" (1926) and "Qué sapa, señor" (1931). Scholars have noted explicit parallels between "Cambalache" and "Qué sapa, señor", with historian Sergio Pujol describing "Cambalache" as a direct continuation of the 1931 composition.

Cambalache

Que el mundo fue y será una porquería
ya lo sé...
en el quinientos seis
y en el dos mil también;
que siempre ha habido chorros,
maquiavelos y estafaos,
contentos y amargaos,
valores y dublé...
Pero que el siglo veinte
es un despliegue de maldá insolente
ya no hay quien lo niegue.
Vivimos revolcaos en un merengue pa
y en un mismo lodo todos manoseaos

¡Hoy resulta que es lo mismo
ser derecho que traidor...
¡Ignorante, sabio, chorro,
generoso o estafador...!
Todo es igual. Nada es mejor!
Lo mismo un burro
que un gran profesor.
No hay aplazaos
ni escalafón...
Los inmorales nos han igualao...
Si uno vive en la impostura
y otro roba en su ambición
da lo mismo que si es cura
colchonero, rey de bastos,
caradura o polizón!..

¡Qué falta de respeto!
¡Qué atropello a la razón!
¡Cualquiera es un señor!
¡Cualquiera es un ladrón!
Mezclaos con Stavisky
van Don Bosco y “la Mignon”,
Don Chicho y Napoleón,
Carnera y San Martín...
Igual que en la vidriera irrespetuosa
de los cambalaches
se ha mezclao la vida
y, herida por un sable sin remache
ves llorar la Biblia contra un calefón!

¡Siglo veinte, cambalache
problemático y febril!...
¡El que no llora no mama
y el que no afana es un gil!...
¡Dale nomás! ¡Dale que va!
¡Que allá en el horno nos vamo'a encontrar!
No pienses más, sentate a un lao!
Que a nadie importa si naciste honrao.
Es lo mismo el que labura
noche y día como un buey!
que el que vive de los otros,
que el que mata, que el que cura
o está fuera de la ley!

— Enrique Santos Diséepolo

Written during the Great Depression and the Infamous Decade, the song uses satire and aggressive reflections that critique reality, the nation's social context, and the atmosphere of the times, unlike tangos of the previous decade. Historian and author Norberto Galasso affirms that its verses serve as a sharp testimony to the collapse of Argentina's oligarchic regime, as well as a severe condemnation of global moral decadence and corruption. According to Pujol, Discépolo, in the fifth verse, disrespectfully juxtapositions several important personalities of the time, seen in the covers of the newspaper Crítica: Alexandre Stavisky, who had permitted the unlawful enrichment of prominent figures of the French Parliament, and was considered, at the time, the global symbol of political corruption; John Bosco (referred as Don Bosco), founder of the Society of Saint Francis de Sales, who was canonized in April of 1934; "La Mignon", whose inclusion is disputed (Note: Since the release of "Cambalache", writers have been conflicted of who could "La Mignone" be referring to. Some have theorized that might to Johann Wolfgang von Goethe's character of the same name that appears on Wilhelm Meister's Apprenticeship (1795 or 96); alongside several lieder and Ambroise Thomas' Mignon (1866). Others have considered it to be reference to specific words: "mignone" which means "beloved" or "lover" in French or, as Pujol; Amuchastegui; and del Priore have interpreted it, a prostitute.); Juan Galiffi (referred as Don Chicho), an Italo-Argentine mob boss who had been deported the previous year; Napoleon, the French emperor; Primo Carnera, a boxer who was defending his world championship title against the Argentine Victorio Campólo; and José de San Martin, a national icon. On this topic, Galasso adds that "Discépolo [...] becomes the voice of the anonymous Argentine who watches, bewildered, as all values crumble: in that "Cambalache" (Note: Galassso is using wordplay in this sentence; the word "Cambalache" is here to express disorder and reference the song both at the same time.) it makes no difference whether it is Napoleon [...] or Don Chicho [...] and with all faith in the country’s future now lost, ‘Primo Carnera’ might well take the place of General San Martín". Pujol maintains that the composition departs from the structure of a standard tango, as it is not set in Buenos Aires or its surrounding area nor is it built around emotional confiict. Additionally, he perceives a sense of nihilism and describes its lyrical contents as "vaguely conservative and fatalist", as the song is critical of progressive politics, liberal positivism, and Marxism, and condemns the effects of a possible revolution by the masses. Furthermore, scholars Mark Falcoff and Ronald H. Dolkart suggest that the song's second and fifth strophes echo the final words of poet Leopoldo Lugones: "There is nothing but filth, filth, and more filth!".

== Release and reception ==
Although it was intended to debut with the release of the film, Sofía Bozán scheduled a live performance of the tango at the Teatro Maipo, despite objections from the film's producer, Ángel Mentasti. This was in consequence of Amadori's showing of the song to Bozán in 1934. In response to this upcoming live performance, Mentasti arrived at the venue with a lawyer with the intention of halting the performance, but Amadori persuaded the director that the performance would serve as effective publicity for the upcoming film. El Alma del Bandoneón (The Soul of the Bandoneon) premiered on 20 February 1935 in the Cine Monumental. In the film, the song is performed by Ernesto Famá accompanied by Francisco Lomuto's orchestra.

From 1933, Discépolo compositions decreased in quantity; nevertheless, "Cambalache" became a huge success and marked his return to social poetry. In retrospect, "Cambalache" has been noted for its lyrics that never seem to be out of date. This has led some to label it as the country's "real national anthem", or as the anthem of tango. Musician Luis Salinas, in an article on why "Cambalache" is his favourite song, recalls that: "It's only as the years go by that you come to understand the lyrics better [...] when you have so many dreams, so many aspirations, you think: 'Well, it can’t really be like that.' Later on, as you go through life, you realise that many things really are like that".

=== Censorship ===
After the 1943 Argentine Revolution, the General Office of Posts and Telegraphs issued a ban that obligated radio stations to stop transmitting media containing colloquial language; instead, radio stations had to transmit media that employed authorized vocabulary exclusively. The ruling was enforced with greater force on tangos, which included "Cambalache". This ban was institutionalized when Juan Domingo Perón founded the National Commission for Intellectual Cooperation in 1946. Three years later, in 1949, under Perón's first presidency, the rulings were lifted.

"Cambalache" was banned again in October 1981, during the Dirty War, as the National Reorganization Process added the song to a blacklist given out to radio stations and record shops due to its lyrics' "subversive scepticism". The de facto government was known for its brutal censorship and repression, along with its suppression of human rights and constitutional guarantees. In spite of this, several newspapers expressed outrage after "Cambalache" was censored. Clarín referred to the never-changing validity of Discépolo's lyrics, while El País humorously stated that "It is not entirely clear to the citizens of this country whether the suppression of pessimism in poetic form is intended to prevent the existing pessimism from deepening further".

== Notes ==
=== Works cited ===
==== Books and journals ====
- Pujol, Sergio (1996). Discépolo: una biografía argentina (in Spanish). Buenos Aires, Argentina: Emecé Editores. ISBN 978-950-04-1702-0 – via the Open Library.
- Castro, Donald S. (1991). The Argentine tango as social history, 1880-1955: the soul of the people. Lewiston: Edwin Mellen Press. ISBN 978-0-7734-9923-2. OCLC 22592977 – via the Open Library.
- Thompson, Robert Farris (20 September 2005). Tango: The Art History of Love. Pantheon Books. ISBN 0-375-40931-9. OCLC 62316077.
- Amuchastegui, Irene; del Priore, Oscar (1998). Cien Tangos Fundamentales (in Spanish). Aguilar. ISBN 950-511-379-X.
- Fifer, Julian; Impey, Angela; Kirchschläger, Peter G. (2022). The Routledge companion to music and human rights. Abingdon, Oxon New York, NY: Routledge, Taylor & Francis. ISBN 978-0-367-49415-5.
- Galasso, Norberto (1995) [1966]. Discepolo y su epoca (in Spanish) (2nd ed.). Buenos Aires, Argentina: Ediciones Corregidor. ISBN 950-05-0872-9.
- Pujol, Sergio (2010). Canciones argentinas (1910-2010) (in Spanish). Buenos Aires: Emecé Editores. ISBN 978-950-04-3279-5 – via the Open Library.
- Falcoff, Mark; Dolkart, Ronald H. (1975). Prologue to Perón: Argentina in depression and war, 1930-1943. Berkeley: University of California Press. ISBN 0-520-02874-0. OCLC 2090727.
- Ferrer, Horacio; Sierra, Luis (1965). Discepolin: El poeta del hombre de Corrientes y Esmeralda (in Spanish). Buenos Aires, Argentina: Ediciones Del Tiempo.
- Reichardt, Dieter (1982). "Tango und Repression". Iberoamericana (1977-2000). 6 (1 (15)). Iberoamericana Editorial Vervuert: 115–125. ISSN 0342-1864. JSTOR 41670836.
- Jones, Derek (2001). Censorship: A World Encyclopedia. Routledge, Taylor & Francis. ISBN 978-1-136-79864-1.
- Azzi, María Susana (1995). Tango! The dance, the song, the story. London: Thames & Hudson. ISBN 978-0-500-27979-3.

==== Media ====
- Del Guercio, Emilio; Pujol (2010). "Cambalache de Enrique Santos Discépolo". Como hice. Season 1. Encuentro.
