= Ayerza =

Ayerza is an Argentine surname shared by several notable people, among them being:

- Abel Ayerza (1861–1918), Argentine doctor who gave his name to the cardiological condition Ayerza syndrome
- Francisco Ayerza (1860–1901), Argentine photographer
- Hernán Cullen Ayerza (1879–1936), Argentinian sculptor
- Josefina Ayerza (b. before 1970), Argentine writer and psychoanalyst living in the United States
- Marcos Ayerza (b. 1983), Argentine rugby player
- Toribio Ayerza (1815–1884), Argentine physician

== See also ==
- Ayerza syndrome - Medical condition named for Abel Ayerza
- Cotesia ayerza - species of wasp
- Estación Francisco Ayerza - Train station in Argentina
