= Raghaipur =

Village in Uttar Pradesh, India

Raghaipur is a village near Mirzapur in the Indian state of Uttar Pradesh.

== Geography ==
It lies between Jigna and Gaipura Railway Station on the Howrah Delhi rail route. It is approximately 55 kilometers from Allahabad city and 28 kilometers from Mirzapur City. Vindyanchal Temple of Maa Sarda is approximately 19 km away. Raghaipur is 2 km from Bihasara on Jhansi-Mirzapur National Highway.

== Culture ==
The village is surrounded by temples including one to lord Shiva who is locally known as Lord Badevaranath. It is an ancient temple surrounded by a pond and garden near Ram-Janaki temple.

== Demographics ==
This village is made up of many castes, but Brahmins (Upadhyay) are in the majority. The village is divided into Gram Sabha- Jasa Baghaura and Jigna Bari. Awadhi is the mother tongue of the villagers, besides this Hindi and English are used widely.

== Economy ==
The main source of income is agriculture. Irrigation of their farmland is from tube well and submersible pumps. A dried lift canal borders the village on the east and south end. Bihashara Bazar is the nearest market.

== Education ==
The village has one primary school and one degree college, respectively.
