= Faculty of Medical Sciences, University of Buenos Aires =

Faculty of Medical Sciences
- Facultad de Ciencias Médicas
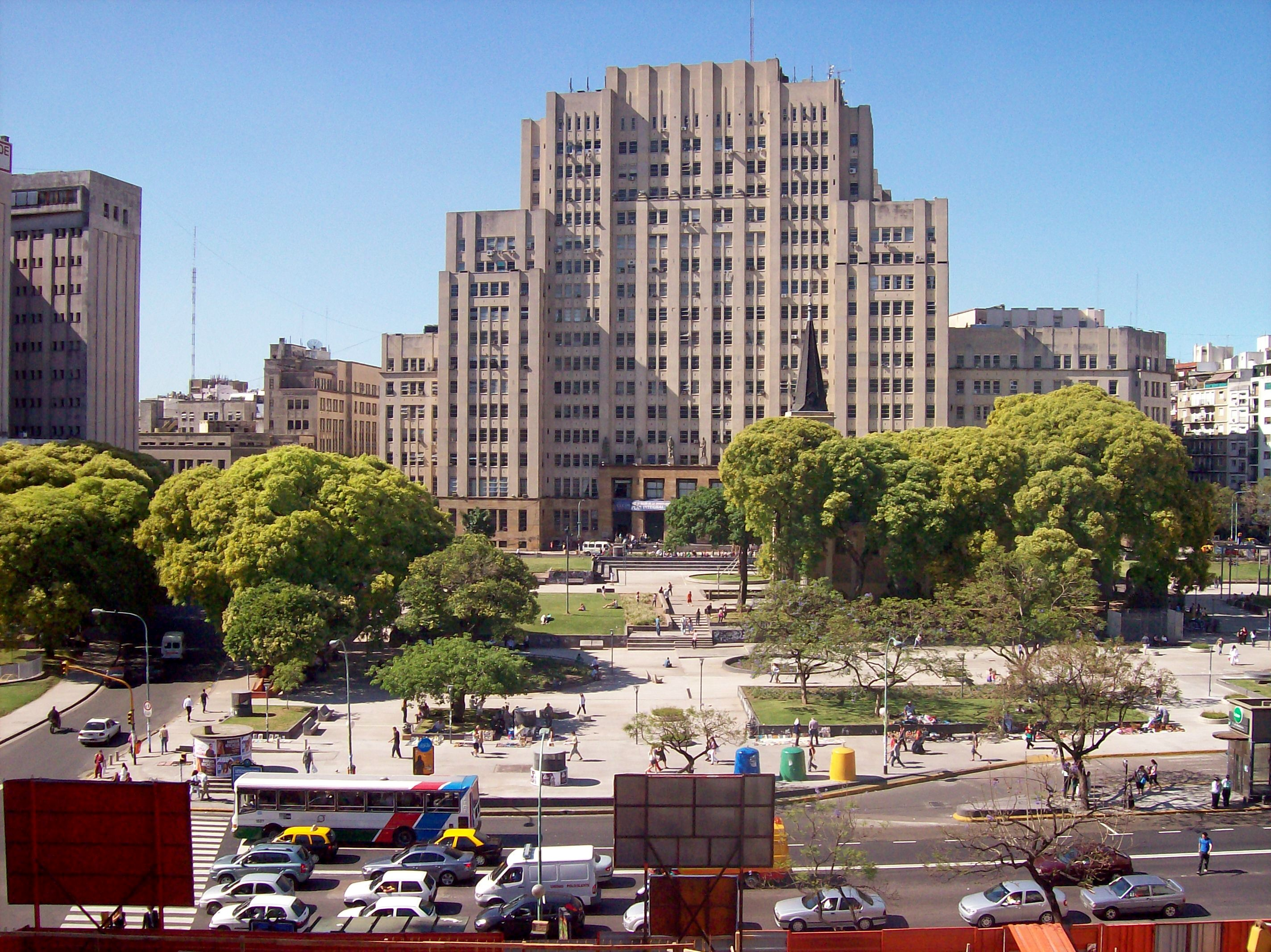
- FMED building across Plaza Houssay
- Type: Faculty
- Established: 1822; 204 years ago
- Affiliation: University of Buenos Aires
- Dean: Luis Ignacio Brusco
- Students: 24,198
- Location: Buenos Aires, Argentina; 34.3556°S 58.2353°W
- Website: fmed.uba.ar

The Faculty of Medical Sciences (Facultad de Ciencias Médicas; FMED), formerly and commonly known as the Faculty of Medicine, is the medical school of the University of Buenos Aires (UBA), the largest university in Argentina. Established in 1822 as one of the UBA's earliest divisions, FMED is presently the largest medical school in Argentina, with over 24,000 enrolled students as of 2011.

The Faculty operates most of the university's hospital network, including the Hospital de Clínicas "José de San Martín", its main teaching hospital. It also has specialized research institutes dedicated to oncological, phthisiological, and cardiological studies.

Most of the faculty's facilities are housed in a large complex located opposite Plaza Houssay, in the Buenos Aires neighborhood of Recoleta. The complex was inaugurated in 1944, and its prominence has made the area surrounding it known simply as "Facultad de Medicina".

== History ==
The Department of Medicine of the University of Buenos Aires was founded less than a year after the university's creation in 1821. Dr. Cristóbal Martín de Montúfar was the department's first prefect. A total of three subjects were imparted by the department: Medical Institutions, taught by Juan Antonio Fernández; Surgical Institutions, taught by Cosme Argerich; and Medical and Surgical Clinics, under Francisco de Paula Rivero. Most textbooks and materials used in the department's early years was almost exclusively of French or Italian origin, due to the influence of two renown researchers: Aimé Bonpland and Pedro Carta Molino. The first class of medical graduates received their degree in 1827.

The fall of the regime of Juan Manuel de Rosas revitalized the university, which had suffered budget cuts and persecution at the hands of the caudillo. For a period of time, the Medical School was separated from the university and depended directly of the Buenos Aires Province government. A decree issued in October 1852 mandated the creation of the Consejo de Higiene Pública ("Public Hygiene Council"), which re-established the old Academy of Medicine and granted it faculty status. Its first president (dean) was Dr. Juan Antonio Fernández, who was replaced two years later by Dr. Francisco Javier Muñiz. Teaching and training was carried out at the Hospital de Hombres building, next to the Church of San Pedro Telmo. The following years saw a rapid reorganization process, which resulted in the inauguration of the faculty's first dedicated building in 1858, and the foundation of the faculty's library in 1863 under Juan José Montes de Oca. Several new subjects were created as well, following the cue of the University of Paris Faculté de médecine.

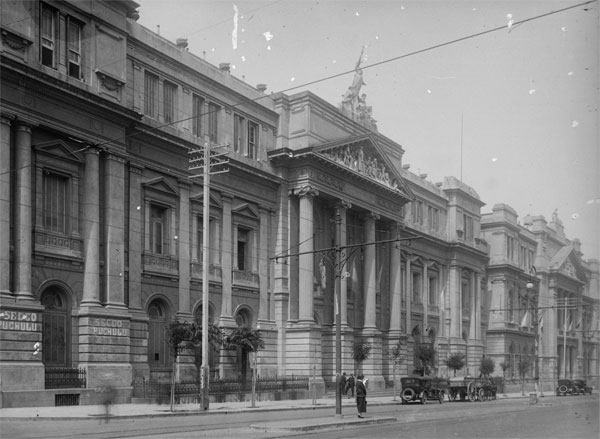
Former seat of the Faculty of Medicine, now housing the Faculty of Economic Sciences.

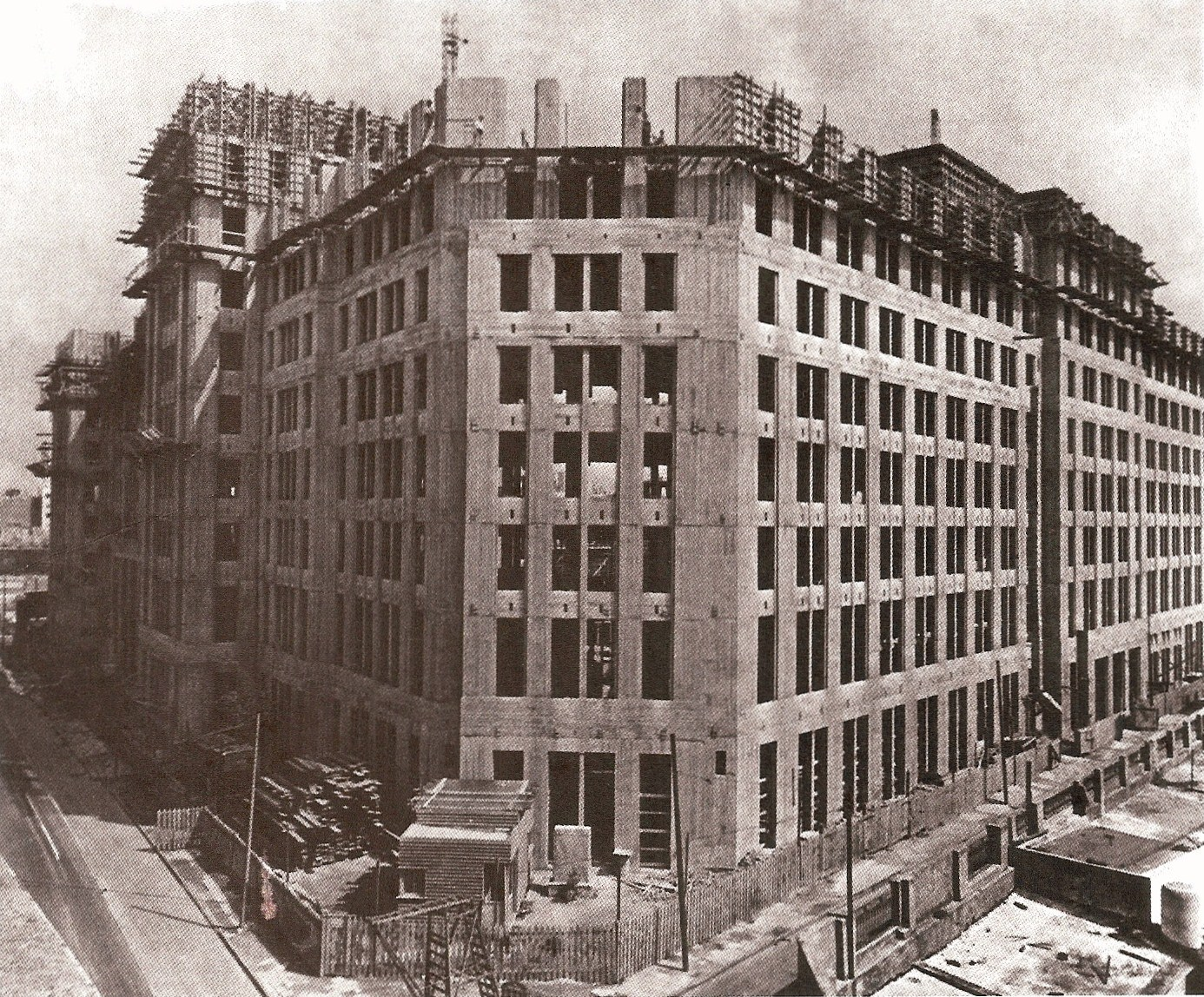
Current seat at Paraguay Street under construction, c. 1940.

A 1874 decree regrouped the faculty back into the University of Buenos Aires. Deans that followed the reorganization include Manuel Porcel de Peralta, Pedro Antonio Pardo, Cleto Aguirre, Mauricio González Catán, Leopoldo Montes de Oca, and Enrique del Arca. In 1880, the new Hospital of Buenos Aires was founded, on Avenida Córdoba (across what is now Plaza Houssay); after the federalization of Buenos Aires in 1883, the hospital was put under jurisdiction of the faculty. It was henceforth known as the Hospital de Clínicas.

The 1880s also saw the creation of the faculty's first institute, the Instituto de Anatomía Patológica.

=== 20th century ===
The need for larger facilities to accommodate the growing student body in the faculty led to it moving to a new building near the Hospital de Clínicas, designed by Francisco Tamburini in 1908 (today, the seat of the Faculty of Economic Sciences). The Avenida Córdoba building was, eventually, also outgrown, and in March 1939 construction began for a new, larger complex destined to house all of the faculty's facilities. The complex was designed by architect Rafael Sammartino, and construction was carried out by construction firm GEOPÉ.

The new main building, an imponent 15-storey building designed in the International Style, was inaugurated in 1944. It is located on Paraguay street, across Tamburini's old palatial complex where the Faculty of Economic Sciences now has its seat. The plaza that separates the two buildings, inaugurated in 1980, is now known as Plaza Dr. Bernardo Houssay, in honor of the Nobel Prize in Medicina laureate who was educated at the university.

In the latter half of the 20th century, a number of specialized institutes were inaugurated within the scope of the faculty. Among these are the Roffo Institute, specialized on oncology; the Lanari Institute, specialized on medical research; and the Vaccarezza Institute, specialized on phthisiology. In addition, a number of co-dependent institutes were opened, such as the Instituto de Biología y Medicina Experimental founded by Dr. Bernardo Houssay, which is co-dependent with CONICET.

Despite now housing the Faculty of Economic Sciences, the former FMED site on Avenida Córdoba is still serviced by the Facultad de Medicina station of the Buenos Aires Underground.

== Degrees ==
Graduate

- Medical degree
- Licenciatura on Nursing
- Licenciatura on Kinesiology and Physiatry
- Licenciatura on Nutrition
- Licenciatura on Obstetrics
- Licenciatura on Speech therapy
- Licenciatura on Bio-image production
- Licenciautra on Podology

Technical

- Technician on Anaesthetics
- Technician on Podology
- Technician on Surgical instrumentation
- Technician on Facial and Body Cosmetology
- Technician on Blood transfusion and Immunohaematology
- Technician on Cardiological practices

In addition, the Faculty of Medical Sciences offers a number of specialization degrees, as well as magister degrees, doctorates and post-doctoral degrees.

== Research institutes and dependencies ==
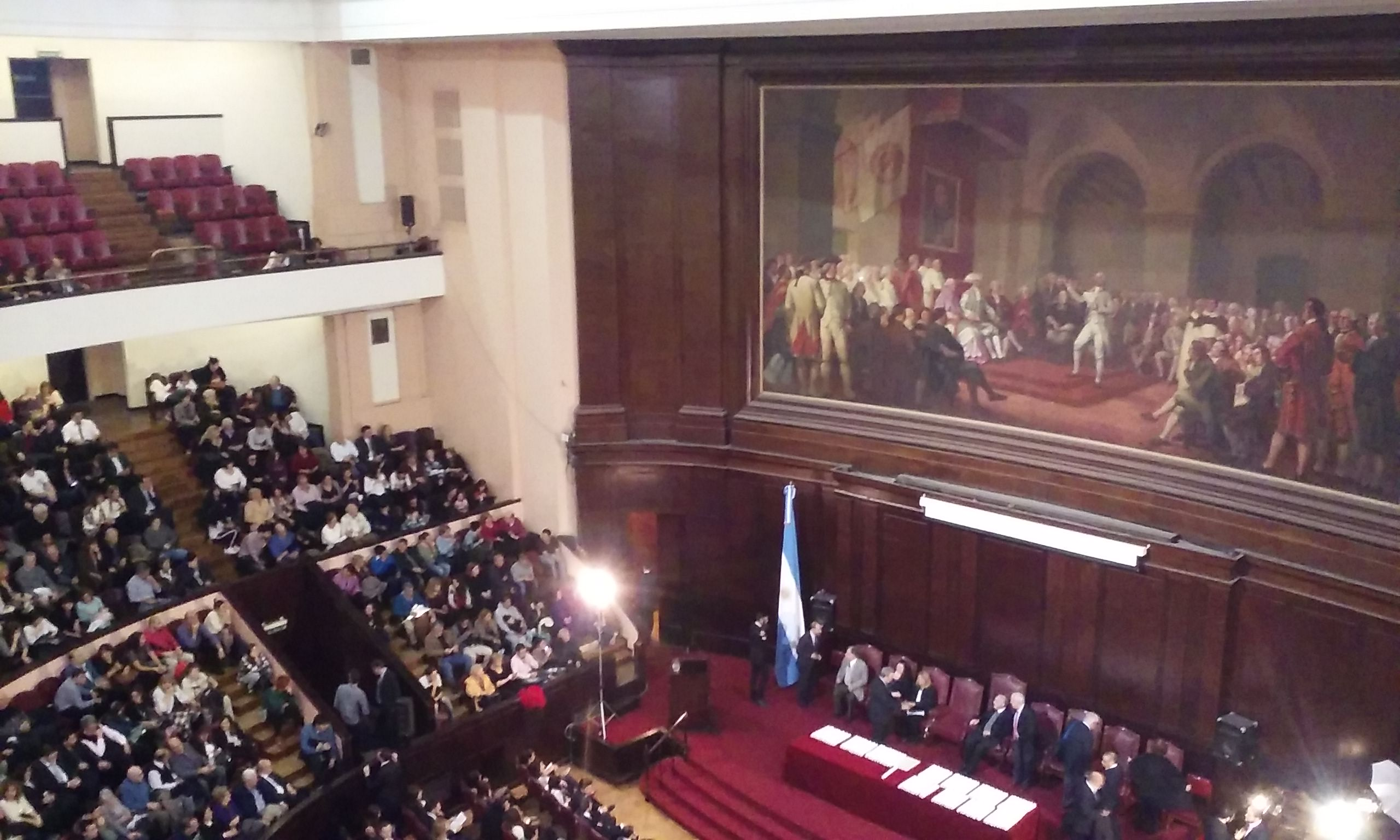
FMED Aula magna in 2017.

The Faculty of Medical Sciences has a number of research institutes and centers, many of which are open to the public to provide free healthcare to the general public. FMED oversees eight constituent institutes (the Instituto de Bioética, Instituto de Historia de la Medicina "Eliseo Cantón", the Instituto de Salud Pública y Medicina Preventiva, the Instituto de Morfología J. J. Naón, Instituto de Innovación Tecnológica en Ciencias de la Salud y Electromedicina, the Instituto de Farmacología, the Instituto de Investigaciones Cardiológicas “Prof. Dr. Alberto C. Taquini", and the Instituto de Cardiología), as well as twenty specialized medical and research centers.

In addition, the faculty operates a number of co-dependent research institutes in strategic relation with CONICET, Argentina's national science and technology council. Among these are the Instituto de Biología Celular y Neurociencias "Prof. Eduardo De Robertis" (IBCN), the Instituto de Investigaciones en Microbiología y Parasitología Médica (IMPaM), the Instituto de Investigaciones Biomédicas en Retrovirus y SIDA (INBIRS), Instituto de Investigación Cardiológicas "Prof. Dr. Alberto Taquini" (ININCA), the Instituto de Fisiología y Biofísica Bernardo Houssay (IFIBIO), the Instituto de Investigaciones Biomédicas (INBIOMED), the Instituto de Investigaciones Médicas IDIM (UBA - CONICET), the Centro de Estudios Farmacológicos y Botánicos (CEFYBO), and the Centro de Investigaciones sobre Porfirinas y Porfirias (CIPYP).

== Political and institutional life ==
Like the rest of the University of Buenos Aires's faculties, the Faculty of Medical Sciences operates under the principle of tripartite co-governance, wherein authorities are democratically elected and professors, students and graduates are represented in the faculty's governing bodies. The faculty is headed by a Dean (Spanish: decano or decana), who presides over the Directive Council (Consejo Directivo). The Directive Council is made up of eight representatives for the professors, four representatives of the student body, and four representatives of the faculty's graduates. Deans are elected by the Directive Council every four years, while elections to the council take place every two years.

Since 2022, the dean of the Faculty of Medical Sciences has been Dr. Ignacio Brusco, who was formerly vice-dean and assumed office upon the election of former dean Dr. Ricardo Gelpi as rector of the University of Buenos Aires.

== Notable people ==
- Two Nobel Prize in Physiology or Medicine laureates have been educated at the Faculty of Medical Sciences: Dr. Bernardo Houssay, co-recipient in 1947 for discovering the role played by pituitary hormones in regulating the amount of glucose in animals; and César Milstein, whose degree was granted by the UBA Faculty of Exact and Natural Sciences but also attended classes at FMED early into his research.
- Arturo Umberto Illia, President of Argentina between 1963 and 1966, received his degree as a physician in 1927, from the Faculty of Medicine of the UBA.
- Ernesto "Che" Guevara, famous communist revolutionary obtained his medical degree from the UBA in 1953.
- José Pedro Montero, President of Paraguay graduated from the UBA as a paediatrician in 1904.
- Élida Passo (1867–1893), the first Argentine woman pharmacist and South American woman university graduate, earned her UBA degree in 1885.
- The first woman to receive a medical degree in Argentina, Cecilia Grierson, did so at the UBA Faculty of Medicine in 1889.
- Other prominent physicians educated at UBA include:
  - Teresa Ratto, surgeon
  - Juan Rosai
  - Luis Agote, dentist
  - Ricardo Guardo (credited as the founder of the UBA Faculty of Dentistry)
  - Geneticist Primarosa Chieri
  - Pharmacologist Augusto Claudio Cuello, professor at McGill University in Canada

== See also ==
- Hospital de Clínicas "José de San Martín"
- List of hospitals in Argentina
