= Tube well =

Type of groundwater well

A tube well for irrigating wheat

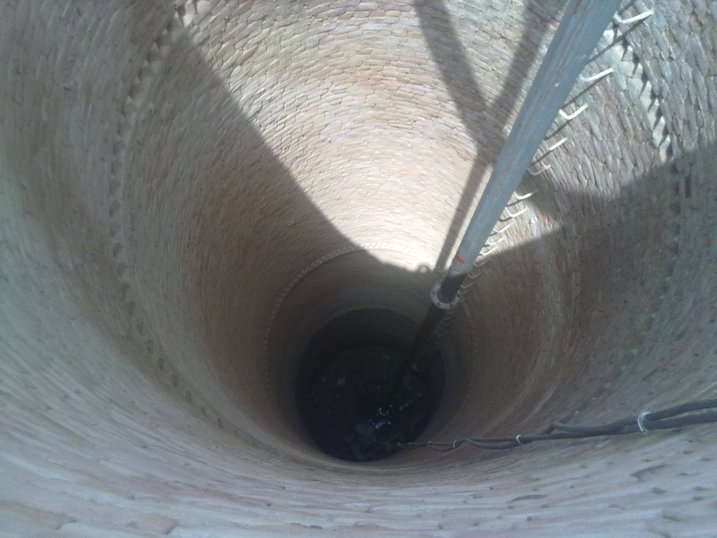
Borehole of a tube well

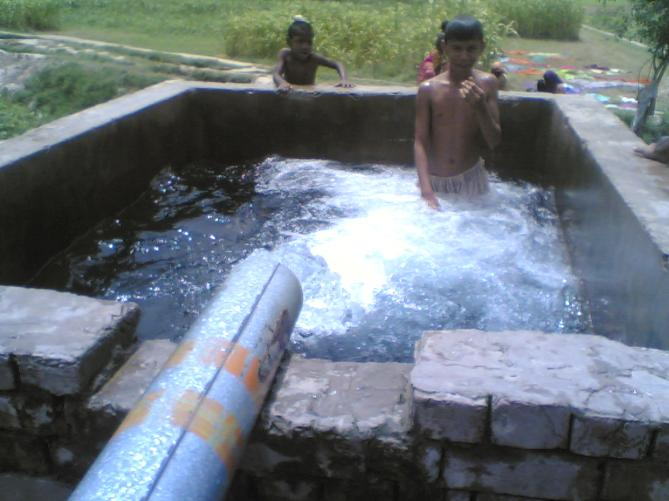
Outlet to a temporary reservoir

A tubewell consists of a number of components, and can empty into a reservoir or field

A tube well is a type of water well in which a long, 100–200 millimetres (3.9–7.9 in)-wide, stainless steel tube or pipe is bored underground. The lower end is fitted with a strainer, and a pump lifts water for irrigation or drinking. The required depth of the well depends on the depth of the water table.

== History ==
The tube well was invented in 1861 by Colonel Nelson Green of the United States Army. Green sold the British rights to his invention to James Lee Norton, who patented it in London in 1867. Versions of Norton's Patented tubewells were used during the British expedition to Abyssinia in 1868 to provide ground water for the advancing force. Green's invention proved so successful for the British that tubewells became known as "Abyssinian wells" and were widely adopted in England and elsewhere for providing reliable water supplies.

== Components ==
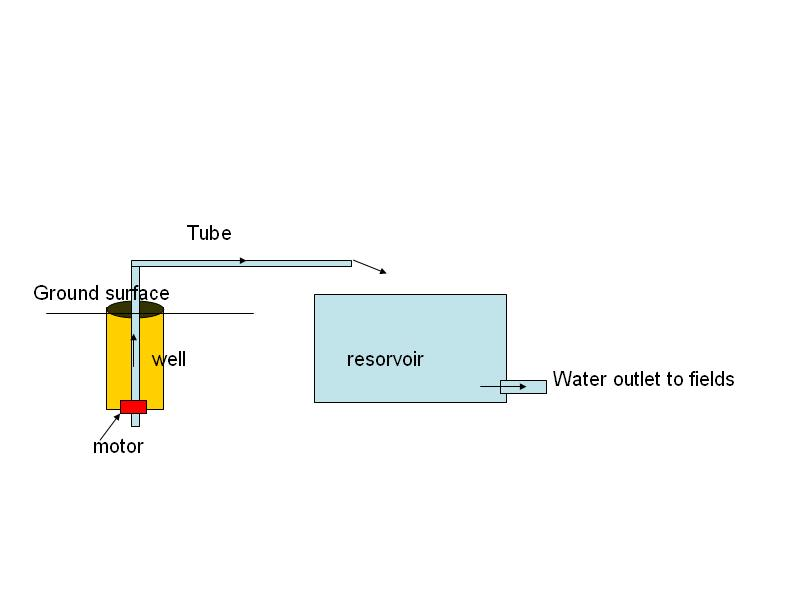
Diagram of a tube well.

=== Temporary reservoir ===
A small reservoir of water is made at the outlet of the tube well. This reservoir is used for different usage of water by the local population.

=== Casing ===
Digging a borewell in Kerala, India

The tube well casing houses the inlet, cylinder, piston valves and rising main of a "down-the-hole" type hand pump. Casing to support the external surfaces of the borehole against collapse may be needed, either temporarily or permanently, and is often made of PVC pipe, which has the advantages of being both cheap and inert.

Seepage down the tube well bore is prevented by the sanitary seal. Seepage from the ground above the aquifer is excluded by the lengths of plain casing. Water to be pumped is admitted through slots in the lower lengths of casing.

Water abstracted from aquifers in relatively soft ground usually contains sand or silt particles, which are liable to cause rapid wear to pump valves and cylinders (and dissatisfaction among consumers). Methods of preventing these particles from reaching the pump are of two general types, screening and sand/gravel packing.

==== Screening ====
In the simplest devices, slits are simply cut in the casing. More elaborate compact screens are available commercially; some can be bolted on to pump inlets. Materials used include woven wire and man-made fabric; the latter can be wrapped around the pump inlet assembly.

==== Sand/gravel packing ====
Graded sand and gravel may be placed from the top of the borehole. More compact, pre-bonded, packs of sand and/or gravel are available commercially; some of these can also form part of the pump inlet assembly. Sand and/or gravel packing is meant to eliminate particles from the water before they reach the screen which they would otherwise have passed through.

== Ground water safety ==
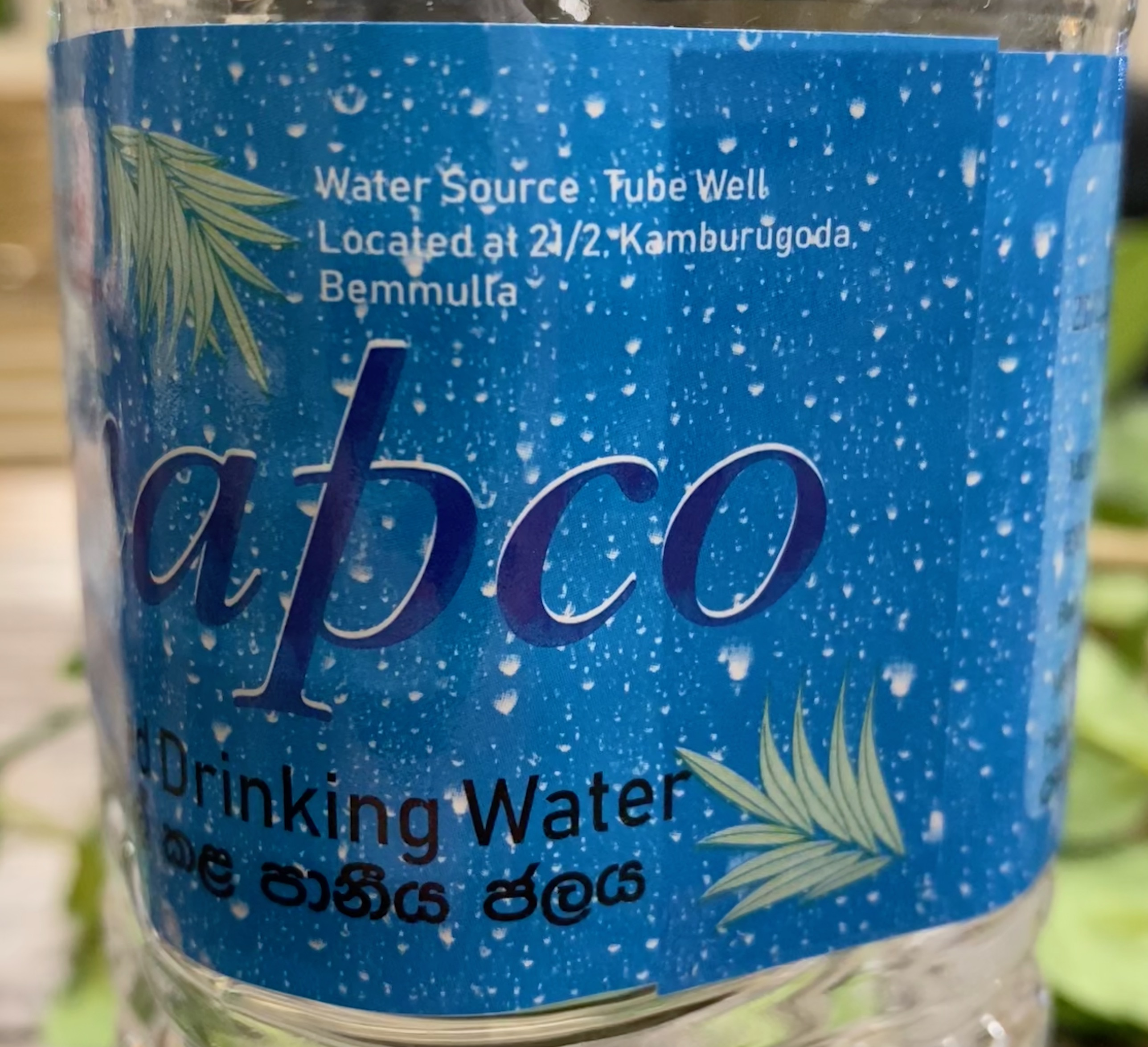
Tube wells are a common source of bottled drinking water in some countries, such as Sri Lanka

When water has little contact with air, it has a low oxygen content, allowing metals to leach into the water if they are present in the surrounding geologic materials. These metals may be quite toxic, causing severe health problems or death if groundwater contaminated with toxic metals is consumed over an extended period. Because tube wells offer direct access to groundwater, it is critical that the water from tube wells be tested for metals before long-term consumption.. Generally, water from surface water sources and dug wells is well oxygenated, so water from these sources usually contains very little or no toxic metals (but surface water usually must be treated to remove biological contaminants).

The first instance of human illness due to metal-contaminated drinking water was reported by an Argentinian doctor, Dr. Abel Ayerza in 1918. Dr. Ayerza was asked to investigate reports of an epidemic of melanoderma and keratosis of the palms and feet in the province of Córdoba, Argentina. Upon visiting the region, Ayerza noticed that the chickens in the region also displayed dermatological symptoms, and astutely surmised that the common element between the people and their animals was their drinking water. Noting that the human patients' symptoms resembled pharmaceutical arsenic poisoning, he tested the water samples and found the local water to contain high concentrations of arsenic and vanadium.

Unfortunately, the arsenic poisoning incident in Córdoba has been repeated many times around the world, in North and South America, Europe, Africa, and Asia. Arsenic-contaminated drinking water in South Asia, especially in Bangladesh, has been termed the "Largest Mass Poisoning in History". At the low concentrations commonly found in contaminated groundwater, arsenic usually takes 5-20 years of drinking water contaminated to cause illness or death for humans. Thus, when tube wells are installed in areas where arsenic is present in geologic materials, reports of human illness often begin to accumulate approximately 5 years later. Arsenic is only one example of toxic metals that may cause health problems when found in drinking water; other groundwater metals that cause adverse health effects include manganese, uranium, and lead. For this reason, it is essential that water from tube wells be tested for the presence of metals when a tube well is installed.

== Advantages of tube well irrigation ==
- Makes groundwater available when the water table is fairly close to the surface.
- Able to irrigate a large area.
- More reliable than surface water during periods of drought.
- Suitable for small holdings.

== See also ==
- Water conservation structures
