= Amalia Jamilis =

Argentine writer (1936–1999)

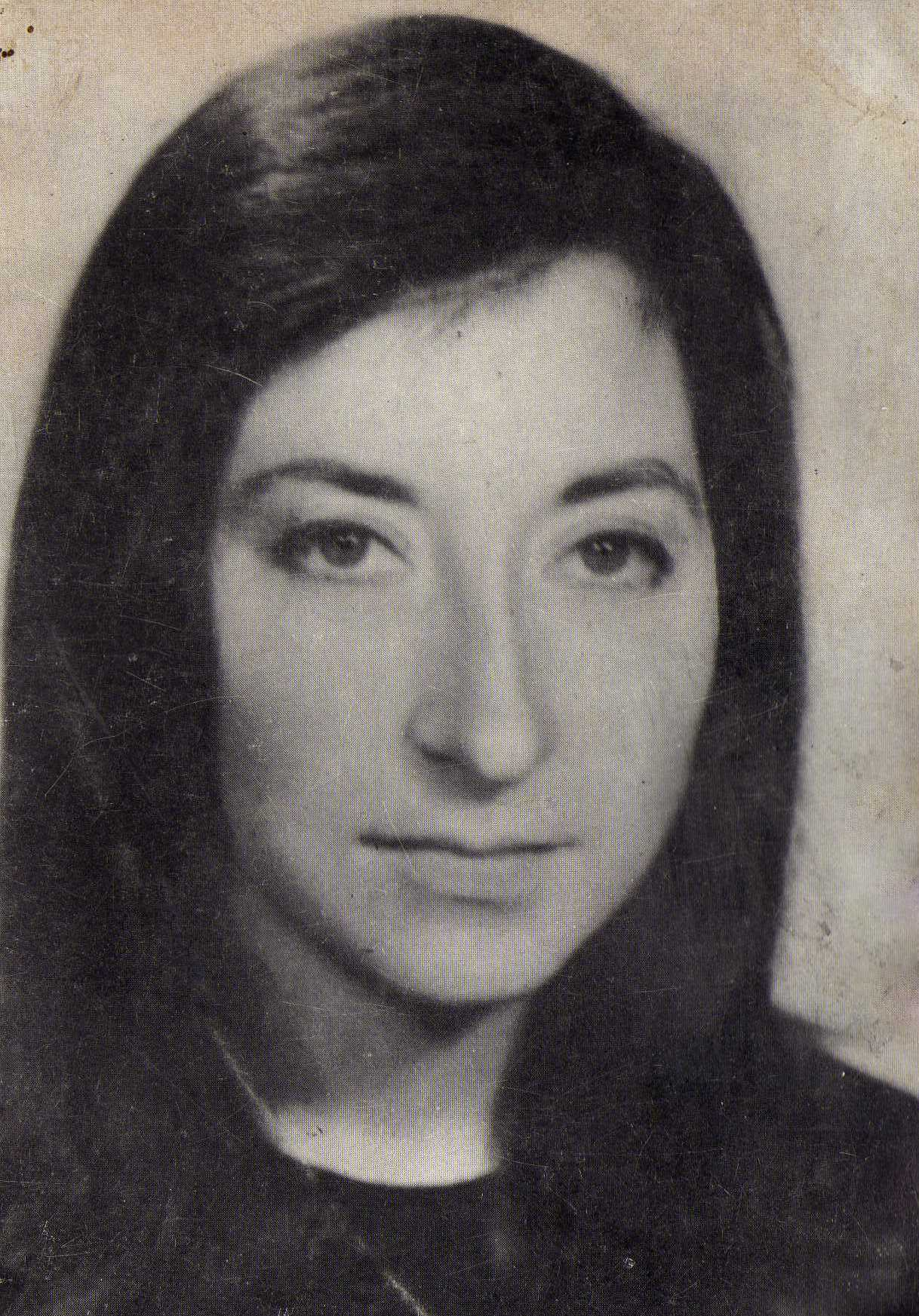
- Born: 30 August 1936; La Plata, Buenos Aires Province, Argentina
- Died: 30 October 1999 (aged 63); Bahía Blanca, Buenos Aires Province, Argentina
- Occupations: writer, visual artist
- Children: Ana Crespo, Andrea Crespo
- Family: Elías Jamilis (brother), Mariana, Nicolás, Alejandro y Fernando Rozas Dennis (grandchildren)

Amalia Jamilis (La Plata, Buenos Aires, 30 August 1936 - 30 October 1999) was an Argentine writer noted for her poetic and experimental style characteristic of 1970's narrative. Although born in La Plata, she lived and developed much of her work in Bahía Blanca.

== Biography ==
Amalia Jamilis left a significant mark on 20th‑century Argentine literature, recognized for her unique voice and contribution to contemporary narrative. Her literary work is distinguished by a poetic style and innovative prose weaving in the social and cultural concerns of her time. Besides her passion for literature, Jamilis trained as a visual artist in Buenos Aires, Argentina, at the Escuela de Bellas Artes Manuel Belgrano and the Escuela Nacional de Bellas Artes Prilidiano Pueyrredón.

== Notable works ==
Her most celebrated publications include:

- Detrás de las columnas (Losada, 1967)
- Los días de suerte (Emecé, 1969)
- Los trabajos nocturnos (Centro Editor de América Latina, 1971 - Libros de la ballena, 2024)
- Madán (Celtia, 1984)
- Ciudad sobre el Támesis (Legasa, 1989)
- Parque de animales (Catálogos,1998)
- Aventura en la bahía de las luces (Postuma: Ediciones LUX, 2021)

== Awards and recognition ==
Jamilis earned numerous honors throughout her career:

- National Arts Award, Premio Nacional de las Artes de 1966 (Detrás de las columnas).
- Emecé Prize 1968 (Los días de suerte).
- PEN Club International Prize 1968 (Detrás de las columnas).
- Fundación Salomón Wapnir Prize 1974 (Aventuras en la Bahía de las luces).
- Award from the Subsecretariat of Culture of the Nation 1986 (Madán).
- National Arts Fund Award 1989 (Ciudad sobre el Támesis).
- Third National Narrative Prize 1992 (Ciudad sobre el Támesis).
- Career Trajectory Award 1996 from the La Plata City Council.
- National Arts Fund Fellowship 1989/1990 (for studies in Spain).

== Anthologies ==
Her stories have appeared in various notable anthologies, both in Argentina and abroad, such as:

- Antología consultada del cuento argentino (Cía. Gral. Fabril Editora, 1968)
- Los nuevos (Centro Editor de América Latina, 1971)
- Erkundungen 20 argentinische erzäler (Verlag Volk und Welt, Berlín, 1975)
- El cuento argentino (Centro editor de América Latina, 1981)
- The web (Three Continents Press (Washington, 1981)
- Frauen in Lateinamerika (Erzalungen und Berichte, Munich 1985 and 1991)
- Primera antología de cuentistas argentinos contemporáneos (Colección Biblioteca Nacional, 1990)
- The image of the prostitute in modern literature (Pierre Horst and Mary Pringle-Frederick Ungar Publishing Co., New York, 1992)
- La otra realidad (Instituto movilizador de Fondos Cooperativos, 1995)
- Cuento argentino contemporáneo (Dif. Cultural, Univ. Autónoma de México, 1997)
- Mujeres escriben (Santillana, 1998)
- Damas de letras (Perfil Libros, 1998)
- Cuentos de escritoras argentinas (Afaguara 2001)
- El terror argentino (Alfaguara, 2002)
