= Juan Galiffi =

Italian-Argentine crime boss

- Born: December 9, 1892; Ravanusa, Sicily
- Died: January 25, 1943 (aged 50); Milan, Italy

Jaun Galiffi (Born Giovanni Galiffi in Ravanusa, Sicily; December 9, 1892 – Milan; January 25, 1943), also known as Chicho Grande or the Al Capone of Rosario, was an Italian-Argentine crime boss during the 1920s and 1930s who was the head of an Italian mafia family in the city of Rosario, Argentina.

Giovanni Galiffi was born in Sicily, Italy, in 1892. He arrived in Argentina at the age of 18, in 1910, and settled in, Gálvez, Santa Fe. There he started as a factory employee he became the owner of a hairdressers and a cantina. He bought houses and vineyards in Mendoza, Argentina and race horses in San Juan. Galiffi developed a mafia family with various Italian criminals. He was attributed with the kidnapping and death of the student Abel Ayerza Arning and Silvio Alzogaray, journalist for the newspaper Crítica.

== Kidnapping of Abel Ayerza Arning ==
The kidnapping and subsequent death of Abel Ayerza Arning, belonging to a well-known high society family, generated a great repercussion in Argentine society. This repercussion generated public pressure that led to the search and arrest of Abel's murderers. Abel Ayerza Arning was a medical student, son of Dr. Abel Ayerza and grandson of Dr. Toribio Ayerza (1815–1884) who arrived in the country in 1846, of Basque-Spanish origin. This doctor gained prestige by performing the first tracheostomy in Argentina, which allowed him to save hundreds of lives in the era before the diphtheria vaccine, and later being co-founder of the Argentine Red Cross . Toribio was the founder of a family in which doctors from various specialties have stood out. The Basque community gathered around him in various entities such as Laurak Bat, an entity that he presided over. In October 1932, the young Abel Ayerza Arning was kidnapped in the province of Córdoba, near a ranch that his parents owned in Marcos Juárez, he was with another young man of his friendship, Ricardo Hueyo. Ricardo was the son of the Minister of Finance of the Nation, during the presidency of Agustín P. Justo. The Minister, aware of the links between the Rosario Mafia and the Santa Fe police, asked the President of the Republic, Agustín P. Justo, for the intervention of the Federal Capital Police. The leader of the gang was Juan Galiffi, Chicho el Grande, who decided, before the intervention of the Federal Police, to release Ricardo Hueyo. He later collaborated with the investigation of Ayerza's whereabouts, and it was determined that the young man would be captive in the Corral de Bustos area. On the other hand, Abel's family decided to pay the ransom to obtain his release, which happens in Buenos Aires, giving Santos Gerardi the sum of one hundred and twenty thousand pesos. After the supposed ransom payment, the kidnappers were waiting for a telegraphic message. The message encrypted through telegraphic transmission was sent as: “send the pig”, to free the kidnapped person, but it would reach the Colón post office with an error that sentenced the life of Abel when it was transmitted like “kill the pig.” Juan Vinti, a member of the gang, took the young man from the house of the Di Grado brothers, took him to a cornfield, shot him five times and buried him, with the kidnappers fleeing the scene. Once a large part of Juan Galiffi's gang was arrested, the body of young Ayerza was located on February 21, 1933. Vicente Di Grado, Pablo Di Grado, Juan Vinti and Romeo Capuano were sentenced to life imprisonment. Juan Galiffi was not found guilty.

On February 24, 1933, his remains arrived in Buenos Aires, to the general indignation and pain of the citizens, when he was buried in the La Recoleta cemetery, where the Ayerza family vault stands, a relative of the young man, Juan Antonio Bourdieu, denounced the complicity of the State and called for the militarization of citizens. Numerous voices would be raised calling for the restoration of the death penalty, which was encouraged by the Minister of Justice himself Manuel Iriondo.

=== Chicho Chico ===
The appearance of the Algerian engineer Alí Ben Amar el Sharpe marked a break in "society." He was, in fact, an Italian named Francisco Morrone (later nicknamed "Chicho Chico") who wanted to challenge Galiffi for his leadership. In 1936, in a settling of accounts, Chicho Grande ordered the assassination of Chicho Chico. Only in 1938 did the police obtain information from one of his murderers, the gunman José Muratore, that his remains were buried in Ituzaingó, on the peach hill of the Marcial Salomón estate. Galiffi turned himself in to the police in 1934 alleging that he was the victim of slander.

=== Italy ===
With no evidence against him, he was deported to Italy in 1933 but returned to Argentina in 1934. It was the late 1930s when Galiffi went back to Italy. He died in his bed in 1943 in Milan from a cardiac arrest.

== Filmography ==
Juan Galiffi and his crime family were the inspiration for many Argentine films that depict the Italian mafia in Argentina. For example, La maffia, directed by Leopoldo Torre Nilsson.

== See also ==
- The mafia
- Rosario
