= Sergio Pujol =

Argentinian historian (born 1959)

Sergio Alejandro Pujol
- Born: 1959 (age 66–67); La Plata, Argentina
- Education: Universidad Nacional de La Plata
- Occupations: Writer, historian, professor
- Employer: CONICET
- Website: sergiopujol.com.ar

Sergio Alejandro Pujol (born 1959) is a historian, writer and essayist. He is a research fellow at CONICET and a critic specialising in Argentine popular music.

== Biography ==
Pujol was born in La Plata, Buenos Aires, Argentina, in 1959. He has been a senior lecturer in 20th-century history for more than two decades at the Faculty of Journalism and Social Communication at the UNLP, and has also been a member of the scientific research staff at the National Scientific and Technical Research Council (CONICET) since he was very young.

In 2007, he was awarded a diploma of merit by the Konex Foundation in recognition of his work in music research and journalism.

== Works ==
- 1989. Las canciones del inmigrante, Almagesto, Buenos Aires, Argentina. ISBN 950-99002-1-4
- 1993. Como la cigarra: María Elena Walsh, una biografía, Beas Ediciones, Buenos Aires, Argentina. ISBN 950-834-020-7
- 1994. Valentino en Buenos Aires: los años veinte y el espectáculo, Emecé, Buenos Aires, Argentina. ISBN 950-04-1322-1
- 1999. Historia del baile, Emecé, Buenos Aires, Argentina. ISBN 950-04-2064-3
- 2002. La década rebelde: los años 60 en la Argentina, Emecé, Buenos Aires, Argentina. ISBN 9789500424066
- 2003. Historia de nuestro tiempo: el mundo entre 1960 y 2000, Ediciones de Periodismo y Comunicación, La Plata, Argentina. ISBN 950-34-0265-4 (en coautoría con Hugo Satas)
- 2004. Jazz al Sur: historia de la música negra en la Argentina, Emecé, Buenos Aires, Argentina. ISBN 9500425394
- 2005. Rock y dictadura: crónica de una generación (1976-1983), Emecé, Buenos Aires, Argentina. ISBN 950-04-2739-7
- 2007. Las ideas del rock: genealogía de la música rebelde, Homo Sapiens, Rosario, Argentina. ISBN 978-950-808-523-8
- 2008. En nombre del folklore: biografía de Atahualpa Yupanqui, Emecé, Buenos Aires, Argentina. ISBN 978-950-04-3103-3
- 2010. Canciones argentinas (1910-2010), Emecé, Buenos Aires, Argentina. ISBN 978-950-04-3279-5
- 2013. Cien años de música argentina, Biblos, Buenos Aires, Argentina. ISBN 978-987-691-062-0
- 2015. Oscar Alemán: la guitarra embrujada, Planeta, Buenos Aires, Argentina. ISBN 978-950-49-4562-8
- 2015. Composición libre: la creación musical argentina en democracia, EDULP, La Plata, Argentina. ISBN 978-987-1985-57-9
- 2017. Discépolo: una biografía argentina, Planeta, Buenos Aires, Argentina. ISBN 978-950-49-5589-4
- 2019. El año de Artaud: rock y política en 1973, Planeta, Buenos Aires, Argentina. ISBN 978-950-49-6615-9
- 2022. Gato Barbieri: un sonido para el tercer mundo, Planeta, Buenos Aires, Argentina. ISBN 978-950-49-7787-2
