= The Soul of the Bandoneon =

El alma de bandoneón
- Directed by: Mario Soffici
- Written by: José A. Bugliot; Mario Soffici
- Produced by: Angel Mentasti
- Starring: Libertad Lamarque; Enrique Serrano; Santiago Arrieta
- Cinematography: Francis Boeniger
- Edited by: Alfredo Traverso
- Music by: Enrique Santos Discépolo
- Distributed by: Argentina Sono Film
- Release date: 20 February 1935
- Running time: 77 minutes
- Country: Argentina
- Language: Spanish

The Soul of the Bandoneon (Spanish: El alma de bandoneón) is a 1935 Argentine tango musical film from the Golden Age of Argentine cinema directed by Mario Soffici, who wrote it with José A. Bugliot. It is considered one of the earliest classics of Argentine cinema.

The film starred Libertad Lamarque, Enrique Serrano and Santiago Arrieta.

== Plot ==
A rich countryman sends his son to the city to study. He becomes involved in a romantic relationship with a girl who wants to succeed in singing. The couple go through great sacrifice and renunciation.

The film deals with themes of popular music and radio culture, and introduces the tango song Cambalache, written by Enrique Santos Discépolo.

== Cast ==
- Enrique Serrano
- Santiago Arrieta
- Gogó Andreu
- Héctor Calcaño
- Charlo
- Dora Davis
- Ernesto Fama
- Miguel Gómez Bao
- Libertad Lamarque
- Francisco Lomuto
- Pepita Muñoz
- Domingo Sapelli
