= Roberto Wernicke =

Argentine physician (1852–1922)

Roberto Enrique Martín Wernicke
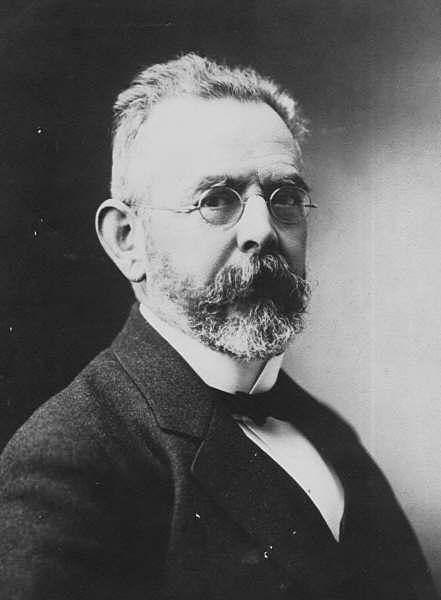
- Born: May 23, 1852; Buenos Aires, Argentina
- Died: October 22, 1922 (aged 70); Buenos Aires, Argentina
- Education: University of Jena, Germany
- Scientific career
- Workplaces: University of Buenos Aires, Hospital de Clínicas "José de San Martín"
- Doctoral advisor: William Thierry Preyer

Roberto Enrique Martín Wernicke (May 23, 1852 – October 22, 1922) was an Argentine physician, embryologist, bacteriologist, educator and researcher. After training at the University of Jena in Germany, he returned to Buenos Aires, where he taught and practiced medicine for many years.

Wernicke introduced microscopy to Argentine medicine, and founded the study of parasitology, microbiology, and general pathology in Argentina. He served as president of the Argentine Medical Association from 1894 to 1897, and was president of the Second Latin American Scientific Congress, in Montevideo, Uruguay in 1901. A Festschrift was published in his honor in 1909.

== Early life ==
Roberto Enrique Martin Wernicke's parents were Robert Heinrich (Roberto Enrique) Wernicke (May 29, 1826, Kelbra - January 24, 1881, Buenos Aires) and Ida Augusta Beltz (or Baltz) von Hagen. Both were from Germany. They married around 1851. Wernicke had several siblings and half-siblings, among them the painter Julia Wernicke (1860-1932).

Wernicke's childhood was spent in Baradero about 160 km northwest of the city of Buenos Aires, where his father settled for health reasons and ran a school. Wernicke completed his secondary studies in Buenos Aires.

== University of Jena ==
In 1872, Roberto Wernicke moved to Germany where he entered the University of Jena, working with William Thierry Preyer. Wernicke graduated in 1876 after publishing a thesis on experimental studies of the physiology of the embryonic heart. Wernicke was one of the first to study the embryonic development of chicken hearts, using sand and water baths to maintain a constant temperature for the developing eggs. A translation of the work was published in the Anales de la Sociedad Científica Argentina (Annals of the Argentine Scientific Society).

== Career in Buenos Aires ==
In 1878, Roberto Wernicke returned to Buenos Aires. In 1884, he received the degree of Doctor of Medicine, after presenting a thesis sponsored by José Teodoro Baca, on the topic "Una primera lección de examen clínico" ("A first lesson in clinical study"). Soon after, he became Assistant Professor of the Chair of General Pathology in the Faculty of Medicine at the University of Buenos Aires.

Roberto Wernicke taught in room IX of the Hospital de Clínicas. His younger brother Otto Wernicke also became a doctor at the Hospital. Roberto Wernicke was known for arriving early and being a demanding instructor.

In 1884, Wernicke established a Laboratory for Contagious Diseases in Animals. Between 1884 and 1887, Wernicke carried out early experiments in photomicrography.

In 1886, the National Department of Hygiene sent him to Rosario to assess the situation created by the presence of cholera in the area. After some difficulties, he was able to impose sanitary criteria and set up a lazaretto outside the city for those who had contracted the disease.

In 1888, Wernicke founded the Laboratorio de la Sociedad Rural Argentina (Laboratory of the Argentine Rural Society) with the support of La Rural's president, Estanislao Zeballos. In his laboratory, a group of young medical students, veterinarians and biologists, began to study the new specialty of bacteriology. Wernicke introduced microscopy to Argentinian medicine, along with the study of parasitology, microbiology, and general pathology. He followed closely the work of European scientists such as Louis Pasteur and Robert Koch.

He was the first Argentine physician to see the microbes under the lens of the microscope and was the first to declare war against those deadly and invisible enemies of man.

In 1889, Wernicke called attention to the dangers of hydatid cysts, a zoonotic disorder caused by Echinococcus granulosus. The parasite can be found in sheep organs, which if eaten by dogs can travel in their faeces to infect humans. Wernicke, who had studied hydatidosis in domestic animals for some years, noted a sharp increase in human cases due to both increased human immigration and the importation of Lincoln sheep which were herded with dogs. Wernicke wrote to the Minister of the Province of Buenos Aires, Manuel Bernardo Gonnet. This led to a project to establish rural and industrial safety codes in 1891, and the passage of National Law 3959 establishing guidelines for the inspection of businesses such as slaughterhouses, meat-packing plants to prevent disease and contamination of food.

In 1890, Wernicke was promoted to Professor of General Pathology in the Faculty of Medicine, holding that position until October 1907. His students included Guillermo Seeber, who described the parasite Rhinosporidium seeberi, and Alejandro Posadas, with whom Wernicke first described the fungal disease Coccidioidomycosis.

Wernicke was a founding member and served two terms as President of the Asociación Médica Argentina (Argentine Medical Association) from 1894-1895 and from 1896-1897. He was vice-president of the First Latin American Scientific Congress held in Buenos Aires on April 11, 1898, where he led the medical sciences section. At the Second Latin American Scientific Congress, held in Montevideo from March 20 to 31, 1901, he served as president of the board as well as being president of the coordinating committee in Argentina and the official delegate of the Argentine government. He also presented a paper on amyloid degeneration.

In 1907, Wernicke formally retired from the University, stepping down from the Chair of General Pathology, and the positions of Academician and Counselor of the School of Medicine. In a ceremony on October 30, 1907, the Board of Directors granted him the title of "Honorary Professor", in recognition of "his services to the city, the nation and the profession". His students and colleagues published a Libro d'e Oro (Golden Book) as a festschrift in his honor.

Wernicke continued to see patients in his private practice. He served as president of the Academia Nacional de Medicina de Buenos Aires from 1912-1913.

Roberto Wernicke died in Buenos Aires on October 14, 1922.
