= Margarita Aguirre =

Chilean writer and critic

- Born: Margarita Aguirre Flores; 30 December 1925; Santiago, Chile
- Died: 15 December 2003 (aged 77); Santiago, Chile
- Occupations: Novelist; biographer; essayist
- Notable work: Cuadernos de una muchacha muda (1951); El huésped (1958); Genio y figura de Pablo Neruda (1964)
- Movement: Literary generation of 1950
- Spouse: Rodolfo Aráoz Alfaro (married 1952 – c. 1964)
- Awards: Emecé Novel Award (1958); Girdle of Honor of the Argentine Society of Editors; Medal of Honor of the Pablo Neruda Foundation (1999)

Margarita Aguirre (30 December 1925 – 15 December 2003) was a Chilean writer and critic. She was the friend and first biographer of Nobel-winning poet Pablo Neruda.

== Biography ==
Margarita Aguirre was the daughter of Sócrates Aguirre and Sofía Flores. Her siblings were named Francisco (Paco) and Perla.

She met the poet Pablo Neruda in Buenos Aires in 1933, where her father was Chile's deputy consul. Neruda held a diplomatic post in Argentina at the time. Despite the age difference (she was 8 years old and he was 29), they formed a lifelong friendship.

Aguirre would say that Neruda was "the last Santa Claus of my childhood," because to celebrate Christmas the poet disguised himself with a white cotton beard and a red robe and gave presents to her and other children.

He hecho muchas cosas mal en mi vida, pero nada me quedó tan mal como ese Viejo Pascuero. Se me caían los algodones del bigote y me equivoqué muchísimo en la distribución de los juguetes. ¿Quién iba a decirme que entre aquellos niños estaba la que iba a ser una de mis predilectas amigas, escritora notable y autora de una de mis mejores biografías? Hablo de Margarita Aguirre.

I have done many things wrong in my life, but nothing was as bad as that Santa Claus. The cotton mustache fell off and I was very mistaken in the distribution of the toys. Who was going to tell me that among those children was the one who was going to be one of my favorite friends, a notable writer and author of one of my best biographies? I'm talking about Margarita Aguirre.

— Pablo Neruda

The following year (1934), Neruda was designated consul of Chile in Barcelona. From there he maintained correspondence with the Aguirre-Flores family, and especially with Margarita, to whom he sent letters illustrated with comic drawings.

In 1938, the Popular Front put an end to the consulate generate of Chile in Buenos Aires and ordered the return of Sócrates Aguirre and his family to Chile.

In 1940, after the end of the Spanish Civil War, Neruda returned to Chile and reestablished his contact with the Aguirres, who were then living in Santa Beatriz. Margarita went with her mother Sofía Flores to listen to a lecture given by the poet in the Radio Cooperativa auditorium. Afterward they greeted each other with great affection.

In the 1940s, Aguirre began studying pedagogy at the Pedagogical Institute of the University of Chile. In 1945, Aguirre worked – together with José Miguel Varas, who would later also become a writer – as an announcer (espíquer) on El Mercurio Radio. This belonged to the Archbishopric of Santiago and dedicated long stretches of its programming to European symphonic music.

In 1952, after another exile of three years, Neruda hired her as his private secretary. This lasted until 1954. Aguirre would later mock this work, clarifying that "it was an honorary title" since, apparently, it was an ad honorem position (never receiving any honor). Neruda had married his second wife, Delia del Carril, an Argentine artist and intellectual twenty years his senior. Describing her as a charming woman but a disastrous housewife, he enlisted Margarita to bring order to the household.

=== Marriage ===
In 1954, Neruda introduced Aguirre to the lawyer Rodolfo Aráoz Alfaro, who would become her husband. "The poet liked to marry off his friends," said Margarita Aguirre; she was one of the victims of the Nerudian Celestina.

Yo soy el buen poeta casamentero. Tengo novia para todos los hombres.

I am the best poet matchmaker. I have a girlfriend for all men.

— Pablo Neruda, Odas elementales

Él tenía que viajar a la Unión Soviética como jurado del Premio Lénin de la Paz, de 1952, y como dicha nación no tenía entonces relaciones con la nuestra, Neruda me encargó que le tramitara una visa en Argentina, con el abogado tucumano Rodolfo Aráoz Alfaro (1901–1968), secretario general del Partido Comunista para Latinoamérica.8 Él era «el mejor amigo argentino» del poeta, según sus propias palabras. Era muy difícil organizar este viaje, pues – como se encontraban en los comienzos de la Guerra Fría entre Estados Unidos y la Unión Soviética – Neruda tenían vetado el ingreso en muchos de los países de paso, debido a sus ideas socialistas.

He had to travel to the Soviet Union as a juror of the 1952 Lenin Peace Prize, and as that nation had no relations with ours, Neruda commissioned me to process a visa in Argentina, with the Tucuman lawyer Rodolfo Aráoz Alfaro (1901–1968), secretary general of the Communist Party for Latin America. He was "the best Argentine friend" of the poet, according to his own words. It was very difficult to organize this trip, because – as they were at the beginning of the Cold War between the United States and the Soviet Union – Neruda had been denied entry into many of the countries of passage, due to their socialist ideas.

— Margarita Aguirre

To mislead the international police, Aráoz and Aguirre exchanged letters as "uncle" and "niece". They became friends, despite having never met. "We told our lives by letter and we fell in love, to the point that we decided to get married."

Delia del Carril, the second wife of Neruda, who then stopped by the Aráoz house in Buenos Aires – Rodolfo was the son of the famous Tucuman physician Gregorio Aráoz Alfaro – gave a decisive boost to this story. She told the lawyer that Margarita was very thin (she was until the end of her life), prompting him to send a note: he had to know her urgently, because he loved thin women.

At the end of 1954, Margarita Aguirre traveled to Buenos Aires for three days to meet him. They traveled together to Santiago. In the early days, Margarita did not want to tell Neruda or her family. They immediately married in the house of the poet "Celestino" on Lynch Street in Santiago. Aguirre became the third and final wife of Aráoz, and the mother of two children, a boy and a girl.

Aráoz took Aguirre to live in the arid countryside of Villa del Totoral in Córdoba Province, Argentina.

=== Children ===
Neruda spent some time debating whether to be godfather to Aguirre's children since he lived far away, but in the end he decided to do so.

When Aguirre had her first son, Gregorio (born 1955), she asked Neruda to be the baby's godfather. Gregorio was "baptized with sea water and Chilean wine". After that, Neruda called her comadre (midwife).

When her daughter Susana was born, due to her narrow eyes, Aráoz would tell his friend Crespo, "Felipe, a daughter has been born to me who is like Balbín."

== Literary career ==
Margarita Aguirre achieved a solid literary reputation when she published Cuaderno de una muchacha muda (1951) and El huésped (1958). This last work earned her the Emecé Award.

[Fue] Una de las novelas más hermosas y de mayor interés auténtico que haya publicado una escritora chilena en largos años.

[It was] One of the most beautiful novels and one of greater authentic interest than a Chilean writer has published in long years.

— Hernán del Solar (critic and writer)

At the end of November 1955, Neruda – who had finished separating from his Argentine wife, Delia del Carril – visited them for several months in Villa del Totoral to write. He strongly supported Aguirre in her literary work, and even challenged her when she faltered in her dedication to it.

Sin embargo, él no me leía [recitaba en público]. Solo leía a los poetas [varones], a todos, incluso hasta los más cursis y malos de los poetas.

However, he did not read me [reciting in public]. He only read poets [men], to everyone, including the cheesiest and worst of the poets.

— Margarita Aguirre

In April 1957, Neruda visited them at their home in Buenos Aires, and on April 11 he was arrested by the police (Argentina was in the midst of the Aramburu Dictatorship, which in 1955 had overthrown the democratic government of Perón) and deported to Uruguay.

=== Biography of Neruda ===
In the early 1960s, José Bianco, director of the Genio y Figura collection of the publisher EUDEBA, asked Aguirre to write a biography of Pablo Neruda. Aguirre accepted, with some reluctance:

Me defendí como pude, pero no me quedó otra que aceptar.

I defended myself as best I could, but I had no choice but to accept.

— Margarita Aguirre

She began an extensive investigation, interviewing the relatives and friends of Neruda, traveling to Temuco with him to unearth his childhood stories, and discovering the remarkable correspondence between Neruda and the Argentine writer Héctor Eandi (which she would compile and catalog eight years later).

In 1964 she published the result of all this effort: Genio y figura de Pablo Neruda (Genius and character of Pablo Neruda) through EUDEBA.

Todos los biógrafos nerudianos tendremos que agradecer siempre a Margarita que nos abriera la puerta para explorar en el mundo inacabable del poeta.

All Neruda biographers will always have to thank Margarita for opening the door for us to explore the poet's endless world.

— Volodia Teitelboim (Chilean writer)

In 1972, Margarita Aguirre took charge of the Complete Works of Neruda, published that year by the Losada company of Buenos Aires, and also compiled and cataloged the correspondence of the Chilean author with the Argentine poet Héctor Eandi.

In 1969, a few months after the death of her husband Rodolfo Aráoz, Margarita Aguirre lived in an apartment in Buenos Aires with the Argentine publisher Luis María Torres Agüero. After the death of her two children – first Susana, then Goyo – she went to live alone in Chile.

In 1999 she received the Medal of Honor of the Pablo Neruda Foundation.

Aguirre suffered from emphysema and spent the last years of her life in a nursing home on California Street in Santiago.

== Legacy ==
Margarita Aguirre died from emphysema in Santiago, Chile on 15 December 2003, at age 77. (Note: Although all websites that mention her age at death claim that she died at 78, she would have turned 78 just 15 days after her death.) She was buried in the cemetery of El Totoral, a small graveyard built next to a 19th-century church a short distance from Isla Negra, the location in which Neruda lived and was buried along with his wife Matilde Urrutia.

Although she never felt part of any group, she is considered to belong to the literary generation of 1950, along with Claudio Giaconi, Enrique Lafourcade, Perico Müller, and Jorge Onfray.

According to Guillermo García Corales in his essay on El huésped, Margarita Aguirre, through the desolation and nihilism of her characters, was the precursor of authors several decades later such as Gonzalo Contreras, Diamela Eltit, and Ramón Díaz Eterovic.

== Works ==
The work of Margarita Aguirre includes novels, short stories, essays, and collections.

=== Novels ===
- 1958: El huésped (Buenos Aires: Emecé Editores)
- 1964: La culpa
- 1967: El residente (Buenos Aires: Emecé Editores)

=== Short stories ===
- 1974: La oveja roja (Buenos Aires: Editorial Sudamericana)

=== Essays ===
- 1964: Genio y figura de Pablo Neruda (Buenos Aires: EUDEBA)
- 1967: Las vidas de Pablo Neruda
- 1980: Neruda, Pablo. 1904-1973

=== Collections ===
- 1951: Cuaderno de una muchacha muda
- 1964: La cueca larga y otros poemas (anthology of Nicanor Parra. Buenos Aires: EUDEBA)
- 1980: Pablo Neruda Héctor Eandi, correspondencia
