= María Esther de Miguel =

Argentine writer (1929–2003)

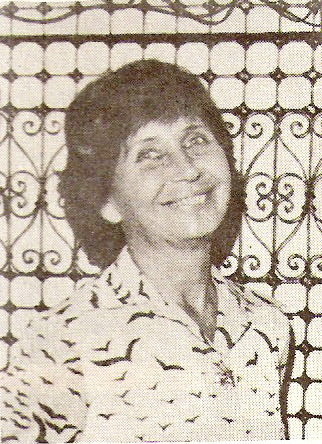
Maria Esther de Miguel

María Esther de Miguel (1 November 1929, Larroque, Entre Ríos Province – Buenos Aires, 27 July 2003) was an Argentine writer.

== Biography ==
Miguel was the daughter of a Spanish immigrant and Jewish mother. At the age of eight, she won a literary contest in composition at school, which was the beginning of her writing career. In her adolescence, she began writing novellas at the Congregación de los Paulinos in Buenos Aires. Her studies included philosophy and literature, earning a scholarship to study literature in Italy. When she returned to Argentina, she abandoned her Catholic religious vocation, and worked as a teacher and journalist. Miguel served as director of the literary magazine Señales and collaborated in the literary supplement of the newspaper La Nación. She served in a leadership role at the Fondo Nacional de las Artes.

Miguel was married to the editor Andrés Alfonso Bravo. She died of colorectal cancer in 2003.

== Selected works ==
- 1961 "La hora undécima" (novela)
- 1965 "Los que comimos a Solís" (short stories)
- 1970 "Calamares en su tinta" (novela)
- 1972 "En el otro tablero" (short stories)
- 1973 "Pueblamérica" (novela) - republished in 1998 with the title "Violentos jardines de América"
- 1980 "Espejos y daguerrotipos" (novela)
- 1983 "Jaque a Paysandú" (novela)
- 1986 "Dos para arriba, uno para abajo" (short stories)
- 1991 "Norah Lange" (biography)
- 1993 "La amante del restaurador" (novela)
- 1995 "Las batallas secretas de Belgrano" (novela)
- 1996 "El general, el pintor y la dama" (novela)
- 1997 "En el otro lado del tablero " (short stories)
- 1999 "Un dandy en la corte del rey Alfonso" (novela)
- 2001 "El palacio de los patos" (novela)

== Awards ==
- Premio Emecé (for La hora undécima)
- Premio del Fondo Nacional de las Artes (for Los que comimos a Solís)
- Segundo Premio Municipal (for Los que comimos a Solís)
- Premio Municipal (for Espejos y daguerrotipos)
- Premio Planeta (for El general, el pintor y la dama)
- Premio Nacional de Literatura
- Palma de Plata of the Pen Club
- Konex Award
- Premio Dupuytrén

== Bibliography ==
- Clarmi Bueno Zandona: Una mirada sobre la obra de María Esther de Miguel. Universidad de les Illes Balears, Palma 2000.
- Malva E. Filer: Las nuevas „traduciones“ de María Esther de Miguel. In: Alba de América, Bd. 3 (1985); Nr. 4/5, pages 98–104.
- Eduardo Romano (Hrsg.): Héctor Tizón. Germán Rozenmacher, Abelardo Castillo, María Esther de Miguel. Kapellusz, Buenos Aires 1987, ISBN 950-13-2242-4 (Narradores argentinos; 2).
