= Primarosa Chieri =

Argentine geneticist

Primarosa Rinaldi de Chieri is an Argentine-Italian geneticist and physician. In 1965, she obtained her medical degree, from the Faculty of Medicine at the University of Buenos Aires. In 1978, she received a doctorate from the same university. She is a consultant and lecturer in genetics and serves as First Chair at the pediatrics department of UBA. She is also a director of the laboratory of genetic analysis at Primagen.

== Membership ==
- Sociedad Argentina de Genética Médica. Miembro Fundador. 1969
- Sociedad Argentina de Obstetricia y Ginecología de Buenos Aires. Miembro Titular. 1979
- Sociedad Argentina de Mujeres Médicas (A.M.A.)
- Asociación Médica Argentina (Professor Extranjero de la Escuela de Graduados). Miembro Honorario Nacional. 1990
- Organización Nacional de Mujeres Italo Argentinas. 1991
- The American Society of Human Genetics. Miembro titular. 1992
- Ibero-American Society of Human Genetics of North America. Miembro Titular. 1993
- Asociación Argentina de Perinatología. Miembro Titular. 1993.
- Sociedad Iberoamericana de Diagnóstico Prenatal. Barcelona, España. Vicepresidenta del Comité de Citogenética.
- Miembro del Consejo Científico Internacional de la Revista Diagnóstico Prenatal 1994
- International Society of Forensic Genetics. Miembro titular. 1997
- Grupo Español y Portugués de la ISFG (GEP – ISFG) Miembro titular. 1997
- Sociedad Argentina de Genética Forense. Socio fundador. 2000
- Sociedad Argentina de Veterinaria. Socio activo. 2002
- International Society Animal Genetics (ISAG) Miembro titular. 2002

== Awards ==
- 1979 – "Alberto Peralta Ramos". Academia Nacional de Medicina: "Diagnóstico Prenatal de los Desórdenes Genéticos II"
- 1987 – II Congreso Argentino de Perinatología: Cordocentesis: técnica, indicaciones actuales y resultados"
- 1989 – Asociación Médica Argentina. Premio Distinción por libro publicado por Editorial "López": "Genética Clínica". "Diagnóstico y Prevención de las enfermedades genéticas"
- 1991 – Asociación Médica Argentina. Premio "Aniceto López, mejor trabajo sobre Actualización Médica: "Investigación del Síndrome XYY en la Argentina"
- 1995 – Asociación Médica Argentina (A.M.A.) Premio “Sertal” Monografía: “Fisiopatología de las enfermedades genéticas ”
- 1996 – IV Curso Internacional de Pediatría. Fundación Cátedra de Pediatría. Premio: “Juan P. Garrahan”: “Aplicación de la Genética Molecular en la Patología Pediátrica”
- 1998 – Ier Congreso Internacional de Medicina Legal y Ciencias Forenses de la República Argentina. Premio: "Premio Congreso": "Aspectos genéticos y psiquiátricos en la filiación controvertida". Con Dra. Patricia Chieri

== Selected works ==
- Chieri, Primarosa. 1988. Genética médica para el consultorio. Buenos Aires, República Argentina: Inter-Médica. (in Spanish)
- Chieri, Primarosa, and Eduardo A. Zannoni. 2001. Prueba del ADN. Ciudad de Buenos Aires: Editorial Astrea de Alfredo y Ricardo Depalma. (in Spanish)
- Chieri, Primarosa, Ricardo A. Basílico, and Ángel Carracedo. 2014. El ADN en criminalística. (in Spanish)
