= William Thierry Preyer =

English-born biochemist and physiologist

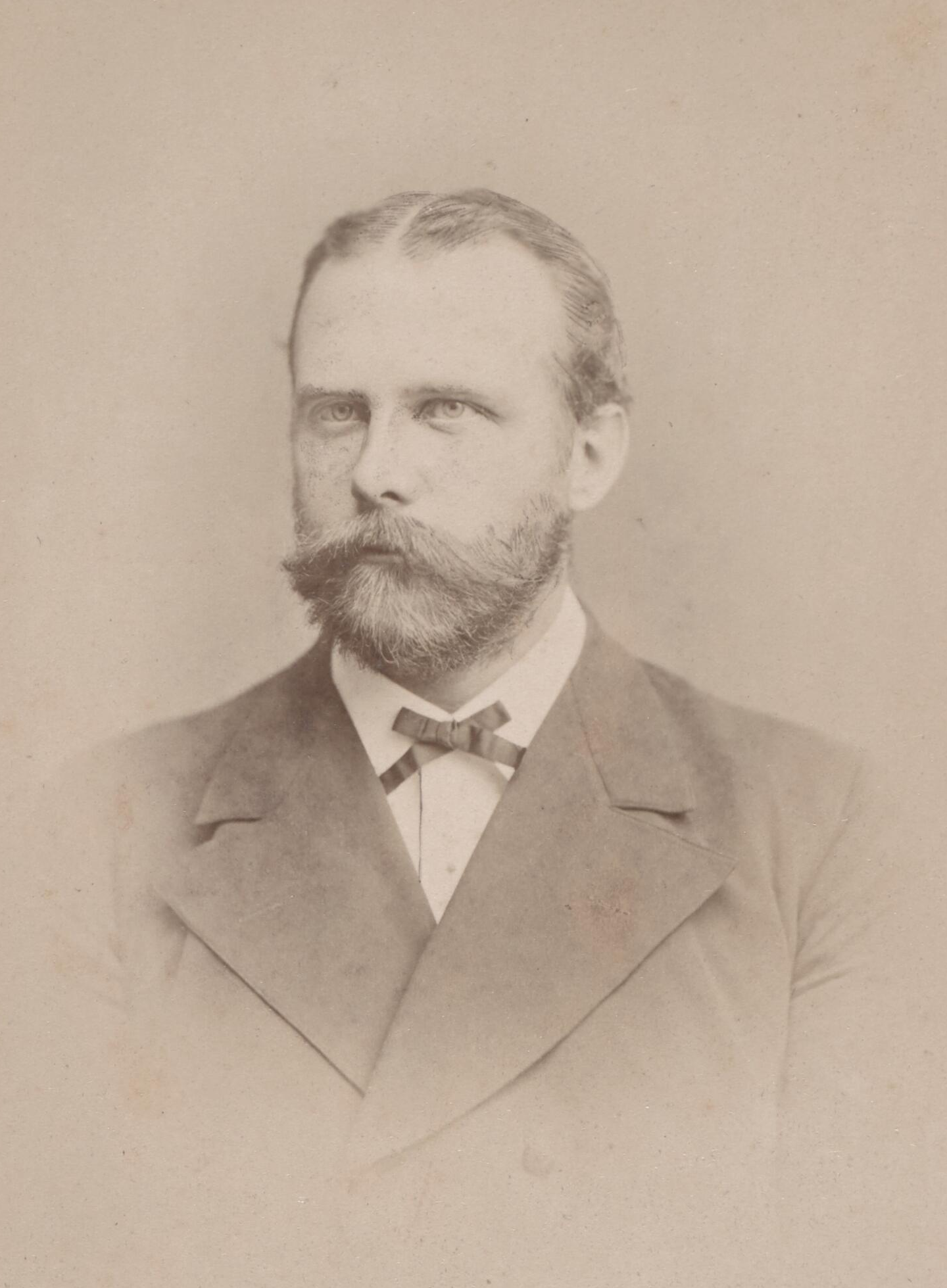
Preyer in 1876, photograph in an album gifted to Charles Darwin

William Thierry Preyer or Wilhelm Preyer (4 July 1841 – 15 July 1897) was an English-born biochemist, physiologist and psychologist who worked in Germany. He worked as a professor of physiology at the University of Jena and then at Berlin. Studying his own son among other children he examined developmental psychology, language acquisition and language pathology.

== Biography ==
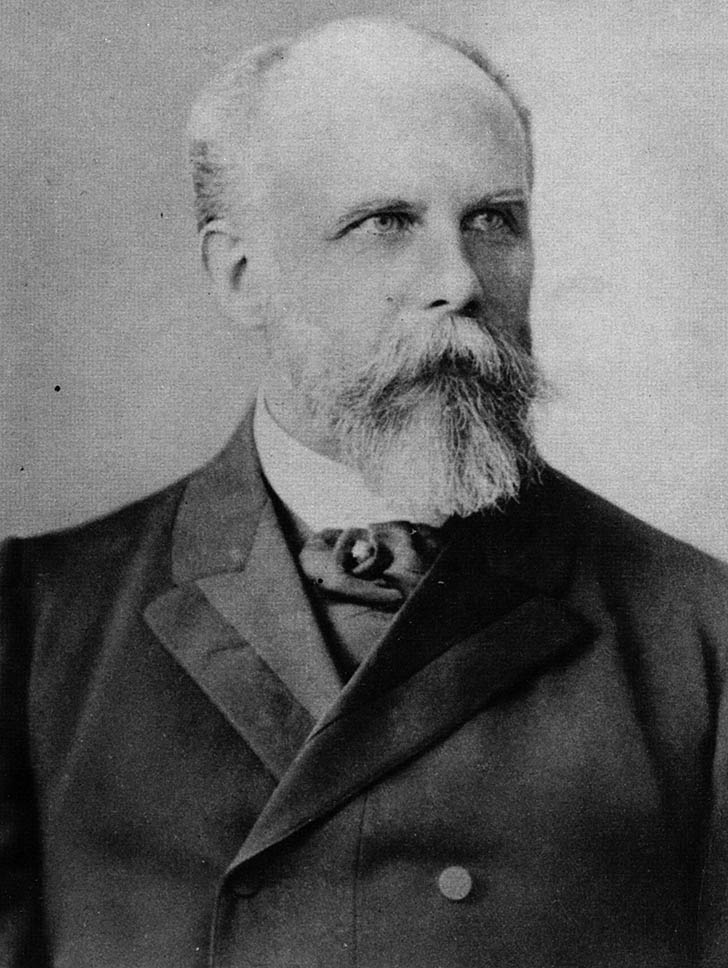
William Thierry Preyer

Preyer was born in Moss Side, Rusholme at Manchester, the son of an industrialist. He went to Clapham Grammar School near London and then studied at Gymnasiums in Duisberg and Bonn. In 1859 he went to study physiology and chemistry at Heidelberg, and received his doctorate in 1862. He studied under Du Bois-Reymond, Helmholz, Claude Bernard and Charles Adolphe Wurtz. In 1866 he earned his medical degree at the University of Bonn, and in 1869 succeeded Johann Nepomuk Czermak (1828-1873) as professor of physiology at the University of Jena. At Jena he was also director of the Physiology Institute. His students included Argentinian Roberto Wernicke. In 1888 he resigned from Jena due to poor health and then lectured for sometime at the University of Berlin.

Preyer was a founder of scientific child psychology, and a pioneer in regards to research of human development based on empirical observation and experimentation. He was inspired by Charles Darwin's theory of evolution and Gustav Fechner’s work in psychophysics. He wrote a biography of Darwin and explained language acquisition in terms of evolutionary ideas. He proposed a myophysiological law to complement Fechner's law. Preyer examined telepathy and thought that it involved unconscious muscle reading.

He authored Die Seele des Kindes (In English edition as The mind of the child) in 1882. This was a landmark book on developmental psychology written as a rigorous case study of his son Axel's development, including observational records. It was translated to English in 1888. He was also the author of another landmark book on developmental physiology titled Specielle Physiologie des Embryo (Special physiology of the embryo). Both works laid a foundation in their respective disciplines for future study of modern human development.

At Jena, Preyer introduced experimental-scientific training methods into his lectures, and also created seminars in the field of physiology. Today, the "William Thierry Preyer Award" is issued by the European Society on Developmental Psychology for excellence in research of human development.

== Works ==
- De haemoglobino observationes et experimenta. dissertation, (University of Bonn) 1866.
- Die Blutkrystalle. Jena 1871 - The "blood crystal".
- Naturwissenschaftliche Thatsachen und Probleme. Paetel, Berlin, 1880 - Scientific facts and problems.
- Die Entdeckung des Hypnotismus. Dargestellt von W. Preyer … Nebst einer ungedruckten Original-Abhandlung von Braid in Deutscher Uebersetzung. Berlin: Paetel, 1881 - The discovery of hypnotism. represented by W. Preyer ... Also an unpublished original essay by James Braid in German translation.
- Die Seele des Kindes: Beobachtungen über die geistige Entwicklung des Menschen in den ersten Lebensjahren. Grieben, Leipzig, 1882 - The soul of the child: observations on the mental development of man in the first years of life.
- Der Hypnotismus. Ausgewählte Schriften von J. Braid. Deutsch herausgegeben von W. Preyer. Berlin: Paetel, 1882. - Hypnotism. Selected writings of James Braid. German edition by W. Preyer.
- Elemente der allgemeinen Physiologie: Kurz und leichtfasslich. Grieben, Leipzig, 1883 - Elements of general physiology.
- Der Hypnotismus: Vorlesungen gehalten an der K. Friedrich-Wilhelm’s-Universität zu Berlin, von W. Preyer. Nebst Anmerkungen und einer nachgelassenen Abhandlung von Braid aus dem Jahre 1845. Urban & Schwarzenberg, 1890 - Hypnotism: lectures held at the University of Berlin by W. Preyer; in addition to notes and an unpublished memoir by James Braid in 1845.
- Zur Psychologie des Schreibens: Mit besonderer Rücksicht auf individuelle Verschiedenheiten der Handschriften. Hamburg: Voss, 1895
