= Telma Reca =

Argentine physician, psychologist

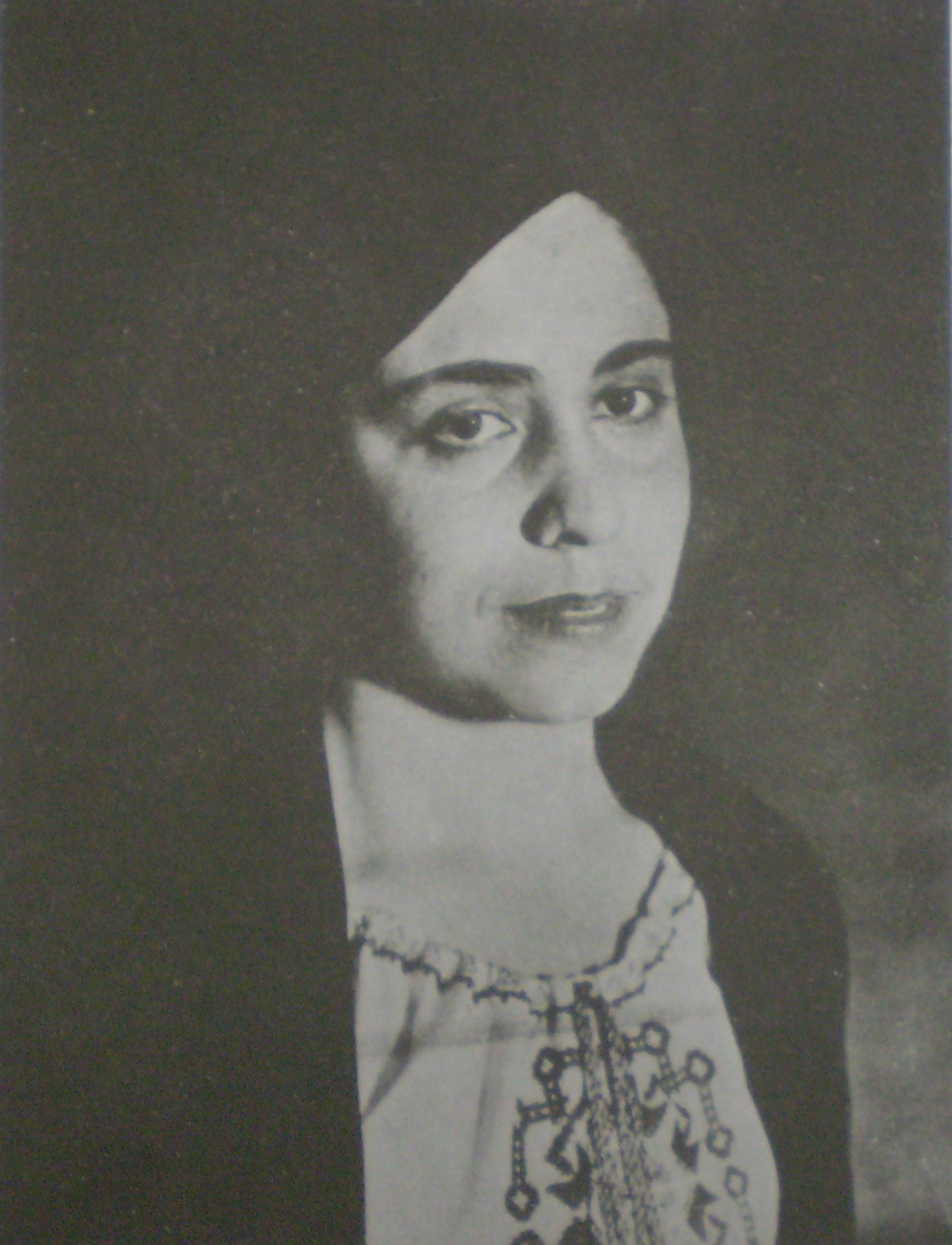
- Born: 8 January 1904; San Juan, Argentina
- Died: 16 June 1979 (aged 75); Buenos Aires, Argentina
- Other name: Telma Reca de Acosta
- Education: University of Buenos Aires; Vassar College
- Occupations: Psychologist, medical doctor
- Spouse: Wladimiro de Acosta
- Children: Three

Telma Reca (8 January 1904 – 16 June 1979), also known as Telma Reca de Acosta, was a pioneer in child and adolescent psychology and psychiatry in Argentina, collaborated in the creation of the psychology career there, and led two divisions of the Department of Hygiene of the Ministry of Social Assistance and Public Health (1937–1948).

== Life and work ==
Reca was born in San Juan, Argentina and moved to Buenos Aires.

Although she showed an early interest in arts and philosophy, she decided to study medicine at University of Buenos Aires (UBA), graduating as a medical doctor with honors in 1928. Expanding her training through scholarships and awards she was able to study in the United States and carried out studies on juvenile delinquency in 1930. In 1931 she obtained a Master of Arts at Vassar College in Poughkeepsie, New York. Her work there resulted in her thesis Juvenile Delinquency in the United States and Argentina (1932), with which she obtained her Ph.D. (from UBA) and, in addition, earned the Eduardo Wilde award.

Returning to Argentina from the United States in 1934, she created the Children's Mental Hygiene office under the Department of Pediatrics at the Hospital de Clínicas José de San Martín in Buenos Aires. According to one biography:

It is important to remember that in Argentina in 1934 she was the creator of the first Children's Mental Health clinic integrated into the Pediatrics department and she was also one of the first professionals who gave relevance to interdisciplinary work.

The office was based on the Child Guidance Clinics that Reca had observed in the U.S. and whose work she was able to study in depth in 1942, this time with the help of a grant from the Rockefeller Foundation. From then on the Hygiene Center was called the Center for Psychology and Psychiatry. In particular, she focused her research on the results of psychotherapy in children and adolescents. Reca was a pioneer in implementing child psychopathological assistance at the hospital level.

Her interest in juvenile delinquency led her to earn the title of Medical Examiner in 1941.

== The night of the long canes ==
After the 1966 military coup d'état in Argentina, Reca was one of the hundreds of university professors who resigned in opposition to the new government and its intervention in University affairs, which resulted in the violent Night of the Long Canes (La Noche de los Bastones Largos) on 29 July. Then, because she had resigned from her professorships, Reca was dismissed from the Directorate of the Department of Psychology and Psychopathology of the Hospital de Clínicas. All the members of the department left with her.

In 1967, together with some collaborators, she founded a private institution called the Center for Medical Psychological Studies of Childhood and Adolescence (CEAM).

Reca died unexpectedly at work in Buenos Aires on 16 June 1979. She had just recently received the 1979 Aníbal Ponce Award.

== Personal life ==
Married to the architect Wladimiro de Acosta, they had three children, and she sometimes used the name Telma Reca de Acosta. Her mother, Doña Rita, always lived with the family.

== Selected publications ==
- Reca, T. (1945). Personalidad y conducta del niño. In Personalidad y conducta del niño (pp. 228–228).
- Reca, T. (1961). Problemas psicopatológicos en pediatría. In Problemas psicopatológicos en pediatría (pp. 383–383).
- Reca, T. (1963). Psicoterapia en la infancia. In Psicoterapia en la infancia (pp. 334–334).
- Reca de Acosta, T. (1966). Aspectos psicológicos de los problemas escolares en las" villas miseria". Revista de Psicología, 3.
- Reca, T. (1972). La inadaptación escolar.
