= Hospital de Clínicas "José de San Martín" =

Coordinates: 34°35′55.6″S 58°23′59.6″W

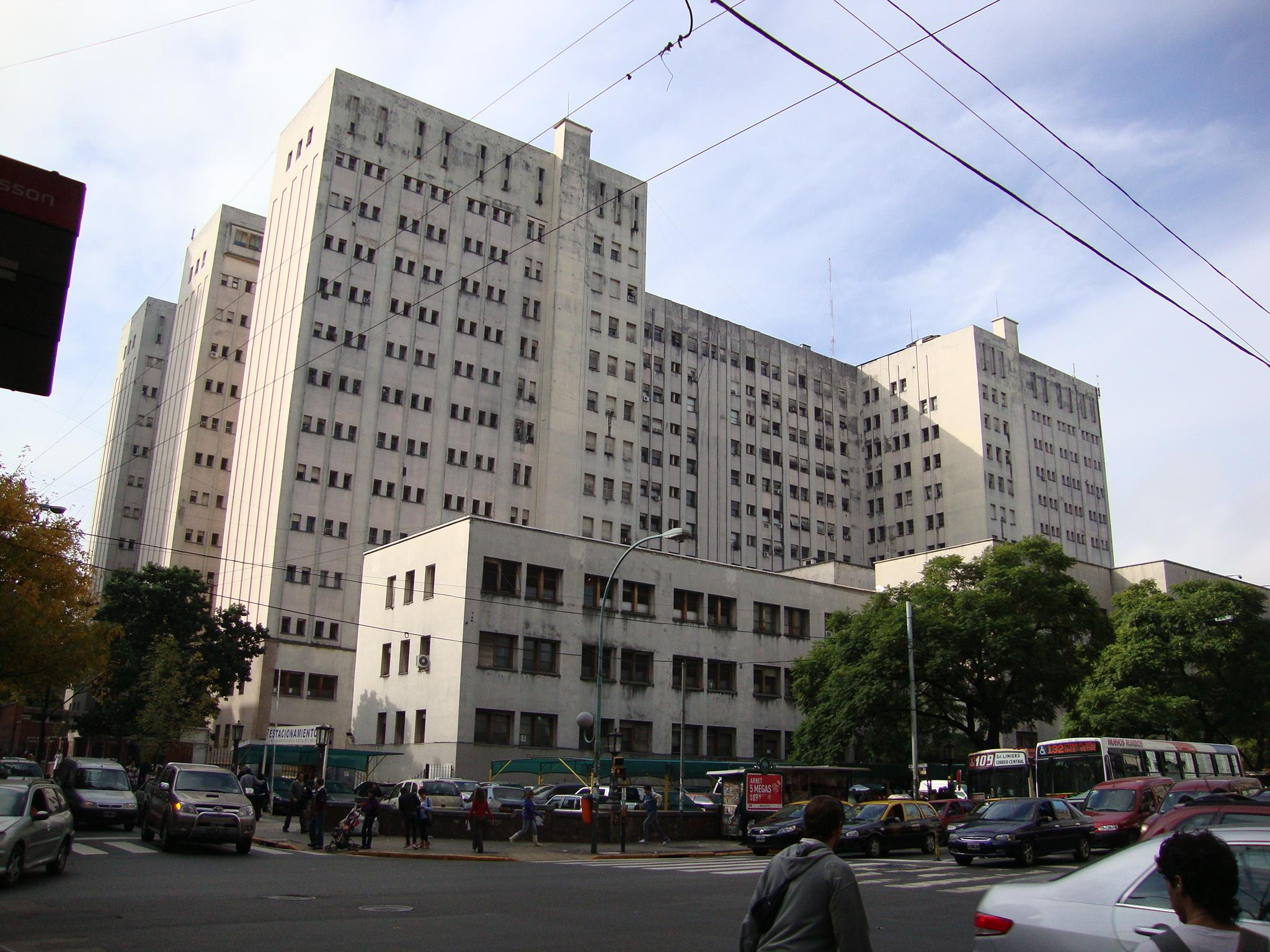

Geography
- Location: Avenida Córdoba 2351, Buenos Aires, Argentina

Organisation
- Care system: Government
- Type: Teaching
- Affiliated university: University of Buenos Aires

Services
- Beds: 400
- Speciality: Multispeciality

History
- Founded: 1881; 145 years ago

Links
- Website: www.hospitaldeclinicas.uba.ar

Old building of the Hospital de Clínicas, located where today stands the Houssay Square in Buenos Aires.

The Hospital de Clínicas "José de San Martín" is a teaching hospital located in Buenos Aires, Argentina. It belongs to the University of Buenos Aires (UBA) Faculty of Medical Sciences, currently the best ranked university in that country.

== History ==
The original building of the hospital was designed by the engineer Mauricio Schwartz and was concluded by 1879. Nevertheless, in 1880 during the conflict for the Federalization of Buenos Aires, it was used as barracks for marksmen and hospital for the wounded in the battles of Puente Alsina, Corrales and Barracas.
The Province of Buenos Aires, defeated by the National Army, gave control of the hospital to the Faculty of Medicine of the University of Buenos Aires and, on August 31, 1880, the National Government ratified that decision.
Built accordingly to the models of its time, the design was inspired by the Friedrichshain Hospital in Berlin and the lazaretto in Karlsruhe.
Ever since 1927, due to the old hospital deterioration and according to needs emerging in the previous years, several projects for building a new hospital were planned but never materialized until 1949, when the current building of the Hospital de Clínicas "José de San Martín" was started in the city block formed by the streets Uriburu, Paraguay, Azcuénaga and Córdoba Avenue. The construction suffered numerous delays and only in 1962 did the first services –Radiology and Otorhinolaryngology out-patient clinic- start functioning in the new hospital. The rest of the services were gradually transferred during the following years.
It was during the first years of the 1970s decade that the new building gained full functionality and in 1975 the demolition of the old hospital was started.

== Education ==
The Hospital de Clínicas "José de San Martín" is the most renowned teaching hospital in Argentina. Every year, it receives hundreds of medical students who will spend there the last three years of their medical education. Only medical students from the University of Buenos Aires are accepted.
The hospital also offers a wide span of residency programs for medicine, biochemistry and pharmacy graduates from UBA and other universities as well as foreign graduates, mostly from other countries in Latin America.
Residencies in the Hospital de Clínicas are among the most esteemed programs in Argentina and South America as many of Argentina's medical figures spent their medical careers in this institution.

== Achievements ==
This prestigious institution has been the setting for many firsts in Argentina and worldwide.

- In 1892, Alejandro Posadas described a case of an unknown infectious disease, which later was named Coccidioidomycosis
- In 1901, Abel Ayerza described what is today known as Ayerza syndrome
- In Argentina, insulin was first applied to a human being in the Hospital de Clínicas. In 1923, Bernardo Houssay, head of the Department of Physiology of the Faculty of Medicine of the University of Buenos Aires, started to use the hormone in animal experiments. Later that year –in September 1923- the first application of insulin to a human patient in Argentina took place in the Department of Internal Medicine of the same medical school, located in the Hospital de Clínicas and directed by Professor Dr. Pedro Escudero. The patient was María Ankelevich and the insulin was applied by Pedro Landabure and Félix Puchulu, trainees in the hospital by then.
- International medicine owes Dr. Mariano Rafael Castex (1886–1968), who worked in the Hospital de Clínicas during the 1920s, many discoveries in the field of clinical investigation. The description of the reticular hepatic necrosis in the persistent obstructive jaundice, the increase in the urobilin in it before desobstruction, the meaning of the splitting of the first cardiac sound in the bundle branch block and the discovery of the systolic murmur that carries his name in the myocardial infarction (Castex Murmur or the Holosystolic MR Type Murmur) are just a few of many of his contributions.
- In 1931, Dr. José W. Tobías, who received his medical formation for many years in the Hospital de Clínicas and was then appointed Head Professor of Internal Medicine in the Instituto Modelo of the Hospital Rawson, published the work that described the Tobías' syndrome (a.k.a. Pancoast-Tobías syndrome).
- In 1932, only three years after Werner Forssmann inserted himself a 65 cm. catheter through his antecubital vein, Dr. Tiburcio Padilla, Dr. Pedro Cossio and Dr. Isaac Berconsky published a work which reproduced Forssmann's, determining hemodynamic values such as the cardiac output, becoming the first cardiac catheterization in America and the third worldwide after Forssmann's in Germany and Jiménez Díaz in Spain.
- Dr. Del Castillo, Dr. Trabucco and Dr. De la Balze described and studied what today is known as Del Castillo syndrome. Del Castillo, brilliant endocrinologist, also described with Dr. Juan Carlos Ahumada in 1932 the Amenorrhoea-Galactorrhoea syndrome (a.k.a. Ahumada-Del Castillo syndrome) of hyperprolactinaemia.
- Medical achievements at Hospital de Clínicas also include the first surgery ever filmed. It was performed by Alejandro Posadas on a hydatid cyst of the lung; the cameraman was Eugène Py, an early French cinematographer
- The Hospital de Clínicas is proudly the first hospital in Argentina to implement the medical residency system. Residencies were inaugurated there in 1944 in response to the efforts made by Dr. Tiburcio Padilla. To be accepted, the candidate must have been a trainee in the Hospital de Clínicas and fix residence in the hospital.

== Notable staff ==
- Ignacio Pirovano
- Andrés Santas
- Roberto Wernicke
- Alejandro Posadas
- Carlos Bonorino Udaondo
- Otto Wernicke
- Abel Ayerza
- Héctor Gotta
- Ernesto Merlo
- José Arce (Note: Argentine physician, politician and diplomat who held the position of President of the United Nations General Assembly between 16 April 1948 and 21 September 1948.)
- Antonio Battiro
- David Staffieri
- Bernardo Houssay (Note: Argentine physiologist, Nobel Prize for Physiology or Medicine in 1947.)
- Luis Federico Leloir (Note: Argentine physician and biochemist, Nobel Prize in Chemistry in 1970.)
- Alfredo Llambias
- Tomás Insausti
- Mariano Castex
- Enrique Dickmann
- Victor Miatello
- José Ingenieros (Note: Argentine physician, pharmaceutic, positivist philosopher and essayist.)
- Germán Dickmann
- Augusto Casanegra
- Enrique Finochietto (Note: Distinguished Argentine academic, physician and inventor.)
- Adolfo Rey Máximo Castro
- Juan B. Justo (Note: Argentine physician, journalist, politician, and writer.)
- Eduardo de Robertis (Note: Argentine physician and biologist who first described the synaptic vesicle.)
- Alfredo Bandoni
- Gregorio Araoz Alfaro
- Pedro Baliña
- Lelio Zeno
- Luis Güemes
- Francisco Arrillaga
- Pascual Palma
- Alfredo Lanari
- Alejandro Castro
- Cleto Aguirre
- Eliseo Roffo
- Egidio Mazzei
- Telma Reca
- Juan Pablo Garrahan
- David Prando
- Pedro Landaburu
- Osvaldo Lourdet
- Pedro Bolo
- Juan Aranguren
- Pedro Chutro
- José J. Tobías
- Ramón Carrillo (Note: Argentine neurosurgeon, neurobiologist, and public health physician.)
- Alicia Moreau de Justo (Note: Argentine physician, politician, pacifist and human rights activist.)
- Juan J. Beretervide
- Aníbal Introzzi
- Manuel Balado
- Rodolfo Dassen
- Julián Fernández
- Pedro Lagleyze
- Félix Puchulu
- Clemente Morel
- Felipe de Elizalde
- Pedro Cossio
- Nicolás Romano
- Luis Agote (Note: Argentine physician and researcher, worldwide first to perform a non-direct blood transfusion using sodium citrate as an anticoagulant.)
- Guillermo Di Paola
- Alfonso Bonduel
- Nerio Rojas
- Eliseo Segura
- Raúl Carrea
- Pedro A. Pardo
- Ángel Centeno
- Mamerto Acuña
- Marcelino Herrera Vegas
- Telémaco Susini (Note: Argentine physician, entrepreneur and media pioneer.)
- Emilio Astolfi
- Daniel Cranwell
- Pedro Escudero
- Juan Carlos Arauz
- Tiburcio Padilla (Note: Argentine physician, first to organize the residency system in his country.)
- Enrique Bazterrica
- Santiago Arauz
- Mario Brea
- Juan C. Ahumada
- David Speroni
- Osvaldo Fustinoni
- José Emilio Burucúa
