= Phthisiology =

Medical speciality within the area of pulmonology that deals with tuberculosis

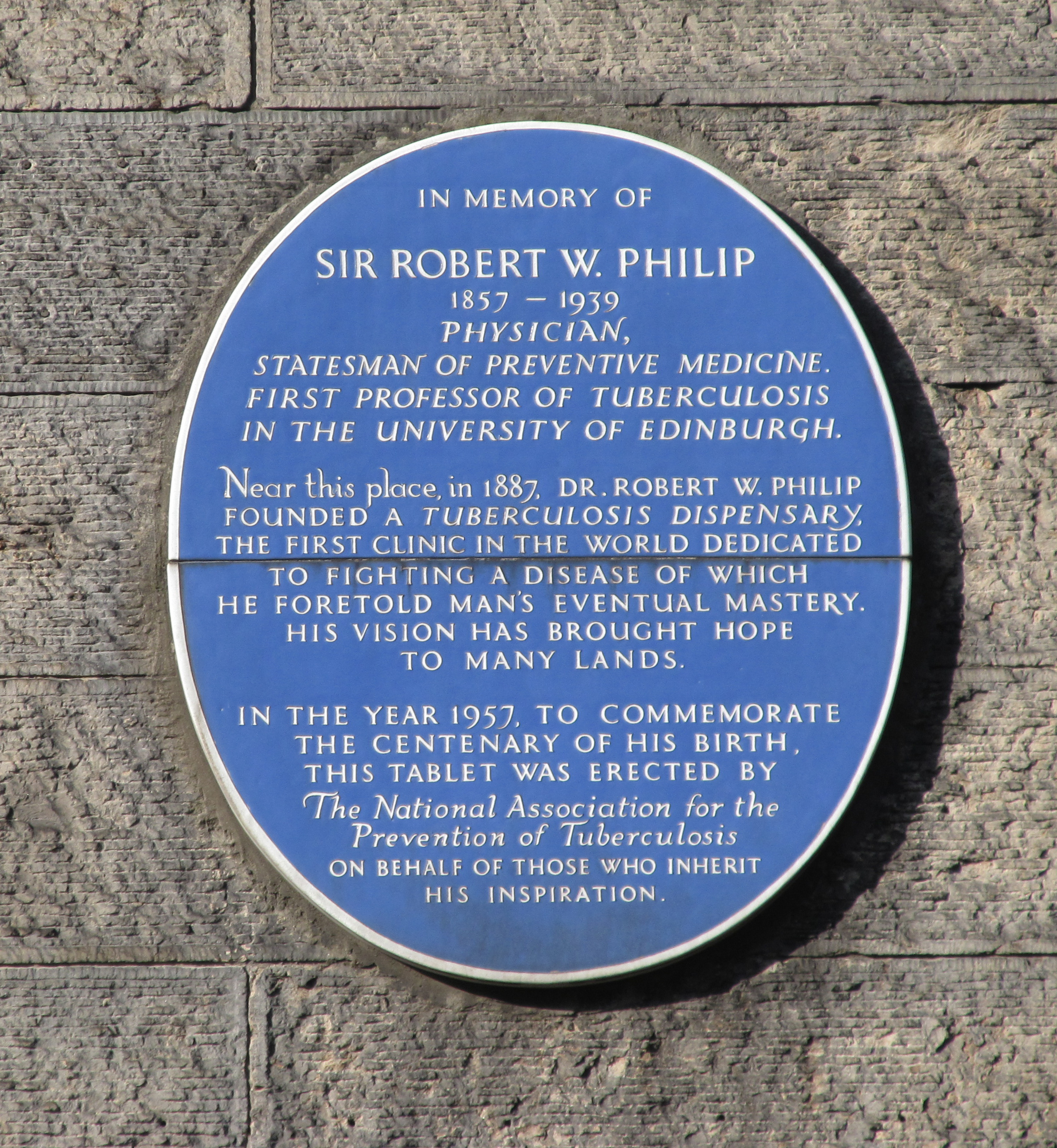
Plaque honouring Robert W. Philip, phthisiologist in Edinburgh

Phthisiology is the care, treatment, and study of tuberculosis of the lung. It is therefore considered a specialisation within the area of pulmonology.

The term derives from the designation by Hippocrates of phthisis (Greek φθίσις) meaning "consumption".
