= Abel Ayerza =

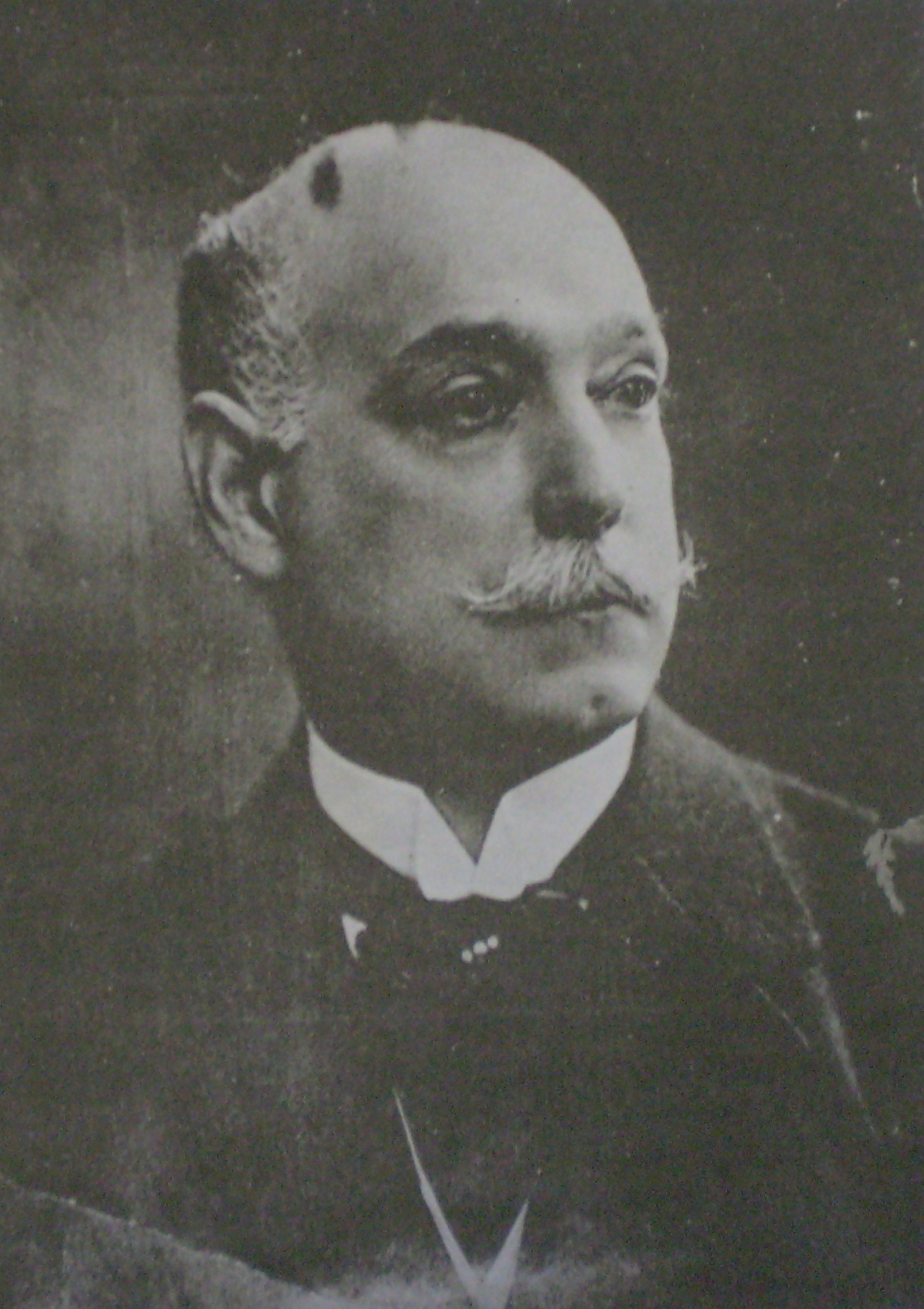
Portrait of Dr. Abel Ayerza.

Abel Ayerza (21 May 1861 Buenos Aires, Argentina – 14 July 1918) was an Argentine doctor who gave his name to the cardiological condition Ayerza’s disease.

== Biography ==
Ayerza was the son of the Basque doctor, Toribio Ayerza. He was a fervent catholic, married to Adela Arning with whom he had 11 children. One of his sons was kidnapped and later killed by Juan Gallifi a local Sicilian gangster which caused a great public outcry.

He undertook his higher education in the Medical Faculty of Salvador College in 1872. In 1882 he was a visiting practitioner to the Hospital de Mujeres (Women’s Hospital) and in 1884 was an internal practitioner of the Hospital de Clínicas. In 1885 he completed his practical studies as an intern in this hospital where he presented his thesis titled “Clinical Observations” sponsored by Dr. Ignacio Pirovano. He achieved his doctorate with a Gold Medal in 1886.

Two years later Ayerza travelled to Paris, France, to develop his technique of neurological examination and cardiopulmonary auscultation. Professor Jaccoud introduced him to nosology and Cartesian logical analysis at the Hôpital de la Pitié. He also worked with Jean Martin Charcot and Joseph Babinski at the Hôpital de la Sâltpetrière, with Pierre Carl Edouard Potain at the Hôpital de la Charité.

On his return to Buenos Aires in 1897 Ayerza acquired the position of First Chair of Clinical Medicine in the Medical Faculty of the University of Buenos Aires, the highest teaching level, where his particular educational style quickly found him renown.

President of the Argentine Medical Association between 1900 and 1901. Counselor of the Faculty of Medical Sciences from 1906 to 1912. Full member of the National Academy of Medicine from 24 October 1914.

Author of more than 200 scientific publications, Abel Ayerza was the first Argentinian name to enter world medicine by dint of “Ayerza’s disease”

== Ayerza’s disease ==
A syndrome of signs and symptoms which include sclerosis of the pulmonary artery, polycythemia, dyspnea and cyanosis. It was first described by Ayerza in a lecture in 1901. Later one of his students, Francisco C. Arrillaga, included the observations into a 1912 thesis and in 1925 published a full description of the disease.

== First discovery of mass arsenic poisoning ==
Ayerza made the first discovery of mass arsenic poisoning due to drinking water. In 1918, he published his observations concerning an epidemic of melanoderma and keratosis of the palms and feet in the Argentinian province of Córdoba. Upon visiting patients in the affected regions, he noted that the chickens of the region also showed dermatological symptoms. He deduced that the common cause of the symptoms must be in their water. He tested the local water and found it contained high levels of arsenic and vanadium.
