= Emecé Editores =

- Parent company: Grupo Planeta
- Founded: 1939; 86 years ago
- Founder: Mariano Medina del Río and Álvaro de las Casas
- Country of origin: Argentina
- Headquarters location: Buenos Aires
- Official website: Emecé Editores Argentina

Emecé Editores is an Argentine publishing house, a subsidiary of Grupo Planeta. Its catalogue contains books on history, politics, economics, art, religion, anthropology, biography, memoirs, children's literature, humor, cooking, popular science, self-help and popular psychology, and the complete works of various authors.

== History ==
The company was founded in 1939 by Mariano Medina del Río, shortly after his arrival from Spain, with the literary collaboration of Álvaro de las Casas, and the support of Medina's former classmate Carlos Braun Menéndez. Emecé's name is derived from the first letters of some of the founders' names (specifically, Mariano, Carlos, Medina, and Casas). In Spanish, M is pronounced "eme" and C "ce".

During its early years, the company specialized in books about the region of Galicia, some written in the region's native language. In the subsequent decade, the company established its flagship series, "The Emecé Library of Universal Works" (La Biblioteca Emecé de Obras Universales). To this day, Emecé precedes its works with an epigram from Miguel de Cervantes, to whom the series is dedicated: that books "are honest entertainment, delight with their language, and amaze and suspend [disbelief] with their invention." (Spanish: "Sean de honesto entretenimiento, deleiten con el lenguaje y admiren y suspendan con la invención.")

Of the thousands of authors published by Emecé during the six decades of its existence, two names stand out—Antoine de Saint-Exupéry, creator and illustrator of The Little Prince, the most popular book published by Emecé; and Jorge Luis Borges, arguably the most important Argentine author of the 20th century, whose work was edited and published by Emecé for forty-five years.

A group of distinguished collaborators edited several distinct collections at once. Eduardo Mallea created The Navy, The Chimera, and Great Essayists (El Navío, La Quimera y Grandes Ensayistas). Inspired by Borges and Adolfo Bioy Casares, Emecé created The Seventh Circle (El Séptimo Círculo), a collection of detective fiction which has grown to include 350 titles, including the major works of Raymond Chandler, James M. Cain, and James Hadley Chase.

Where possible, Emecé has attempted to include major works of artistic and cultural interest, ranging from Toynbee, Malraux, Matisse, Kandinsky, Francastel, and Huyghe to deluxe editions of Don Quixote. The house is known for its detailed coverage of Argentine topics, including Martín Fierro, the works of Bonifacio del Carril (in particular his Monumenta Iconográfica), records of Argentina's Pre-Columbian inhabitants (such as the Inca and Diaguita), and the history of the gaucho.

In 1948, beginning with the publication of The Ides of March by Thornton Wilder and The Stranger by Albert Camus, Emecé established its "Great Novelists" collection, which continues to this day. Many celebrated writers, including Franz Kafka, William Faulkner, Alberto Moravia, François Mauriac, Camilo José Cela, Ernest Hemingway, Graham Greene, Vladimir Nabokov, Saul Bellow, Jorge Amado, Norman Mailer, Ray Bradbury, have been included in the collection. It has since widened its scope to include writers of popular fiction, such as Arthur Hailey, Erich Segal, Frederick Forsyth, Colleen McCullough, Stephen King, John le Carré, Leon Uris, Tom Clancy, Ken Follett, Arthur C. Clarke, Judith Krantz, Mary Higgins Clark, Scott Turow, Dean Koontz, Michael Crichton, Wilbur Smith, and Sidney Sheldon.

However, Emecé does not confine itself to works of fiction. It has published Papillon by Henri Charrière, Roots by Alex Haley, The Road Less Traveled by M. Scott Peck, as well as the works of Leo Buscaglia and Jaime Barylko.

Emecé is one of the largest publishers in Argentina.

In 1989, Emecé opened a publisher in Barcelona, Spain. In 2000, Emecé Spain bought itself out and was renamed Ediciones Salamandra. In May 2019, Salamandra was acquired by Penguin Random House.

== Imprints ==
Emece publishes books under the following collections:

- Biblioteca Jorge Luis Borges
- Biblioteca Adolfo Bioy Casares
- Grandes Novelistas
- Grandes Ensayistas
- Biblioteca Breve
- Formentor (Seix Barral)
- Cruz del Sur
- Lingua Franca

== Emecé Award ==
In 1954, the "Emecé Literary Prize" ((in Spanish): Premio Emecé Argentina) was created, and was the competition of its kind to be established in Argentina. To this day it remains a means for new authors to gain recognition. Quite a few literary figures achieved success as a result of winning the prize, including Beatriz Guido, Dalmiro Saenz, Griselda Gambaro, María Esther de Miguel, María Granata, and Angélica Gorodischer. They, along with Bioy Casares, Ernesto Sabato, Eduardo Gudiño Kieffer, Isidoro Blaisten, Abelardo Castillo, Abel Posse, César Aira, and Margarita Aguirre, number among more than three hundred Argentine writers in the Emecé catalogue.
