= Abelardo Castillo =

Argentine writer

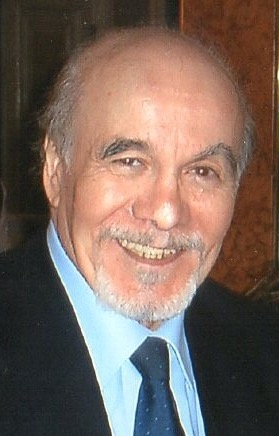
- Abelardo Castillo in 2006
- Born: San Pedro, Provincia de Buenos Aires, Argentina
- Occupations: Writer; novelist; essayist; dramatist
- Writing career
- Language: Spanish

Abelardo Castillo (March 27, 1935 – May 2, 2017) was an Argentine writer, novelist, essayist, diarist, born in the city of San Pedro, Buenos Aires. He practised amateur boxing in his youth. He also directed the literary magazines El Escarabajo de Oro and El Ornitorrinco. He is well regarded in the field of Latin American literature. In 2014 he won the Diamond Konex Award as the best writer in the last decade in Argentina.

== Works ==
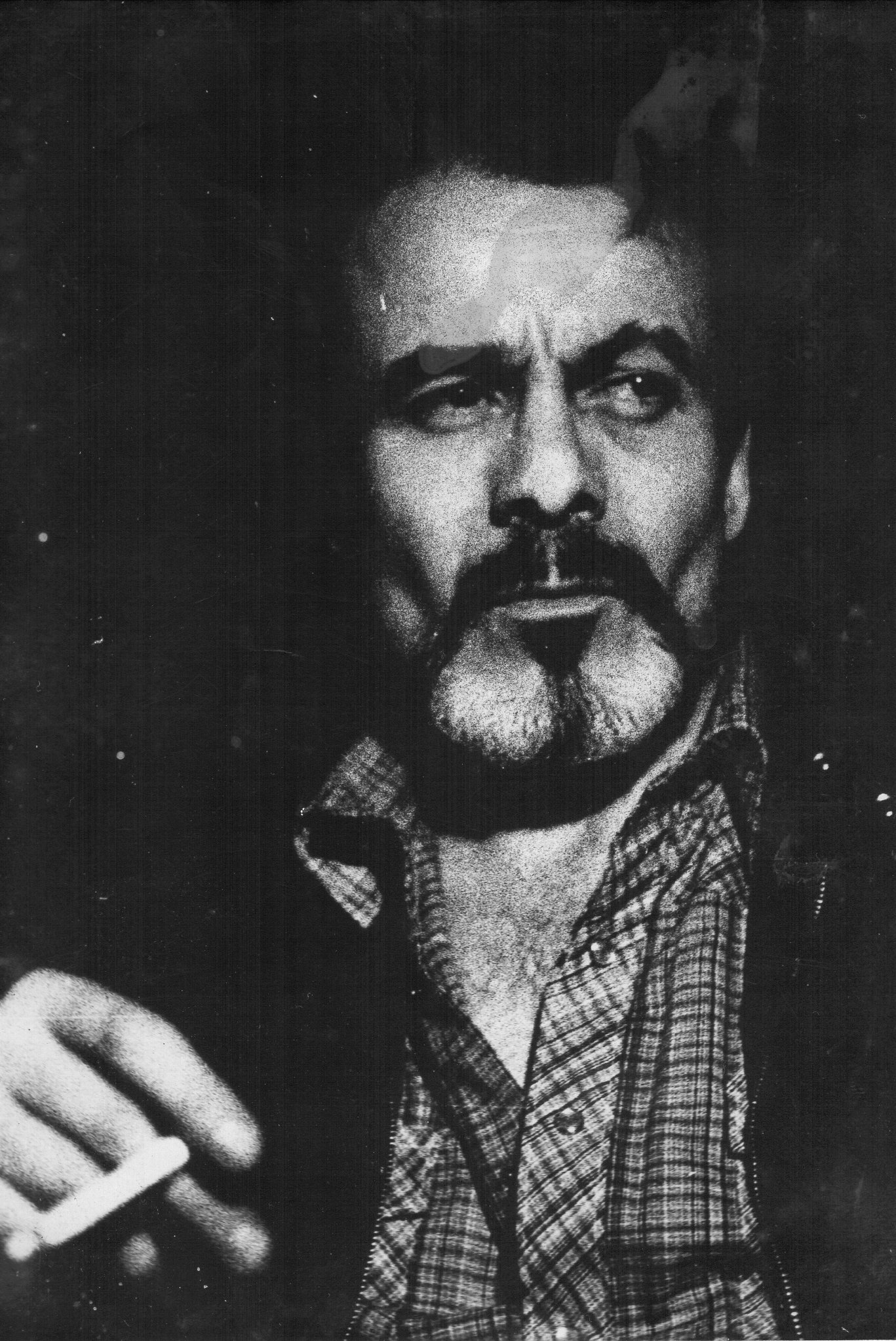
Abelardo Castillo (unknown year)

- Antología personal (1999) ISBN 950-860-078-0
- La casa de ceniza (1967)
- La casa de ceniza (1994) ISBN 950-04-1434-1
- Crónica de un iniciado (1991) ISBN 950-04-1111-3
- El cruce del Aqueronte (1982)
- Cuentos crueles (1966)
- Cuentos crueles (1982) ISBN 950-07-7023-7
- El que tiene sed (1989) ISBN 84-397-1566-8
- El Evangelio según Van Hutten (1999) ISBN 950-731-226-9
- Israfel (2001) ISBN 950-731-307-9
- Israfel, drama en dos actos y dos tabernas sobre la vida de Edgar Poe (1964)
- Las maquinarias de la noche (1992) ISBN 950-04-1207-1
- Los mundos reales V : el espejo que tiemblo (2005) ISBN 950-731-470-9
- El oficio de mentir : conversaciones con María Fasce (1998) ISBN 950-04-1842-8
- Las otras puertas; [cuentos] (1961)
- Las otras puertas, y otros cuentos (1972)
- El otro Judas; o, El pájaro mágico (1961)
- Las palabras y los días (1988) ISBN 950-04-0800-7
- Las panteras y el templo (1976)
- El que tiene sed (1985) ISBN 950-04-0442-7
- Ser escritor (1997) ISBN 950-639-063-0
- Teatro completo (1995) ISBN 950-04-1530-5
- Teatro: Sobre las piedras de Jericó. A partir de las 7. El otro Judas (1968)
- Cuentos brutales with Rodolfo Walsh and Luisa Valenzuela (1997) ISBN 950-753-030-4
- Diarios. 1954-1991 (2014)
- Diarios. 1992-2006 (2019)
