= Arsenical keratosis =

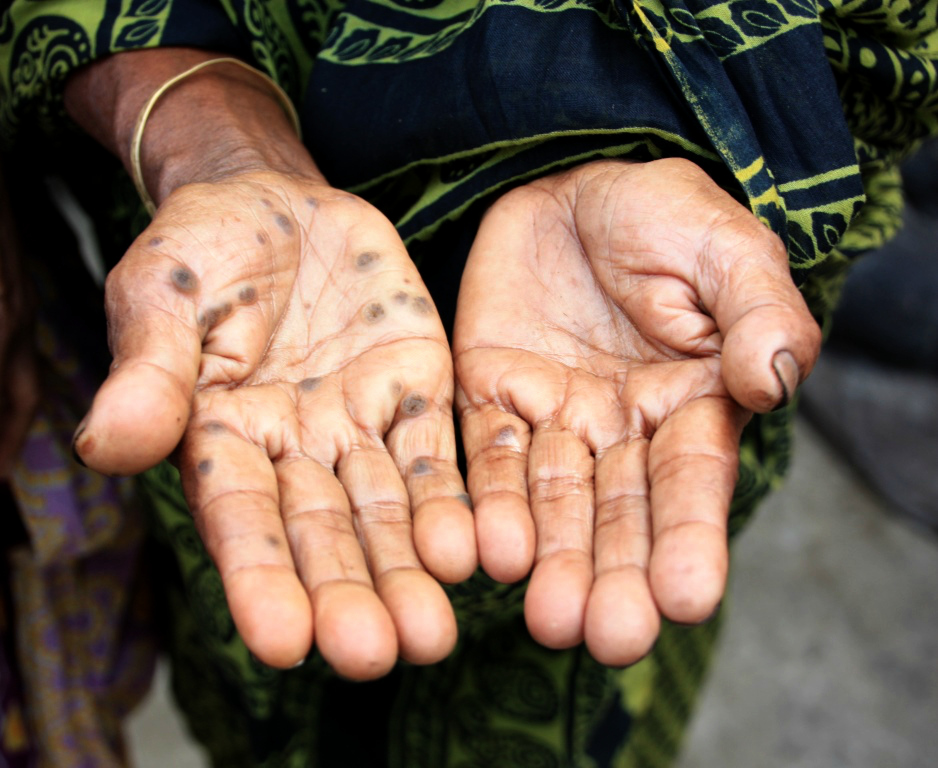
- Arsenical keratosis (palms)
- Specialty: Dermatology

Arsenical keratosis (AK) is growth of keratin on the skin caused by arsenic, which occurs naturally in the Earth's crust and is widely distributed in the environment, Arsenical compounds are used in industrial, agricultural, and medicinal substances. Arsenic is also found to be an environmental contaminant in drinking water (well water) and an occupational hazard for miners and glass workers. Arsenic may also causes other conditions including: Bowen's disease, cardiovascular diseases, developmental abnormalities, neurologic and neurobehavioral disorders, diabetes, hearing loss, hematologic disorders, and various types of cancer. Arsenical keratoses may persist indefinitely, and some may develop into invasive squamous cell carcinoma. Metastatic arsenic squamous cell carcinoma and arsenic-induced malignancies in internal organs such as the bladder, kidney, skin, liver, and colon, may result in death.

== Definition ==
AK is a pre-cancerous skin condition caused by longterm poisoning with arsenic.

== Signs and symptoms ==
AK typically presents with small yellow corn-like warty bumps in the skin preceded by dark marks. It is frequently seen on the sides of the palms of hands, and base and sides of fingers and feet. The dark marks may look like 'raindrops' and these may be associated with Mees' lines across the nails. The bumps typically appear 20 to 30 years after exposure to arsenic from usually a herbal medicine or contaminated water from wells.

AK may precede the development of squamous cell carcinoma or basal cell carcinoma.

== Pathophysiology ==
Arsenite impairs nucleotide excision repair, and it may also affect gene expression by increasing or decreasing DNA methylation. The high affinity of arsenic for sulfhydryl groups makes keratin-rich cells (e.g., epidermal keratinocytes) a sensitive target for arsenic-induced toxicity. Arsenic has been shown to alter epidermal keratinocyte differentiation processes, induce overexpression of growth factors, and enhance proliferation of human keratinocytes.

== Differential diagnosis ==
Actinic keratosis, seborrhoic keratosis, and squamous cell carcinoma in situ may appear similar.

== Treatment ==
- A chelating agent (e.g., dimercaprol) may be helpful to correct acute arsenic exposure, but it has minimal or no effect for patients who had arsenic exposure a long time ago.
- Oral retinoids (e.g., acitretin, etretinate) may be helpful in treating arsenic-induced cutaneous lesions and in reducing the risk of cutaneous and internal malignancy formation, especially in Bowman's disease.
- Topical 5-fluorouracil cream or 5% imiquimod cream may be useful in treating arsenical keratoses and Bowen's disease.
