= Toribio Ayerza =

Argentine physician

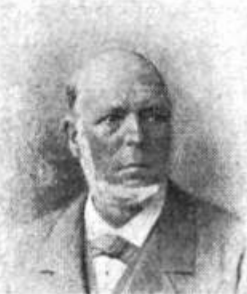
Toribio Ayerza

Toribio Ayerza (1815–1884) was an Argentine medical doctor of Basque origin who was co-founder of the Argentina Red Cross along with Guillaume Rawson.
