= Federación Universitaria de Buenos Aires =

Federation of University of Buenos Aires students' unions

- Institution: University of Buenos Aires
- Location: Uriburu 920, Buenos Aires, Argentina
- Established: 1908
- President: Lucille Levy (NE–FCE)
- Members: 328,361 (2012)
- Affiliations: Argentine University Federation

The Federación Universitaria de Buenos Aires ("Buenos Aires University Federation"; FUBA) is a federation of students' unions in the University of Buenos Aires (UBA). It was founded in 1909, and presently represents the over 300 thousand graduate students enrolled at UBA. It forms part of the Argentine University Federation, and is its largest member.

The FUBA is made up of the thirteen students' unions (Spanish: centros de estudiantes) representing graduate students in the university's thirteen constituent faculties. Its authorities are elected on a yearly basis through an assembly of elected delegates from each of the faculties, known as the Congress of the FUBA.

== History ==
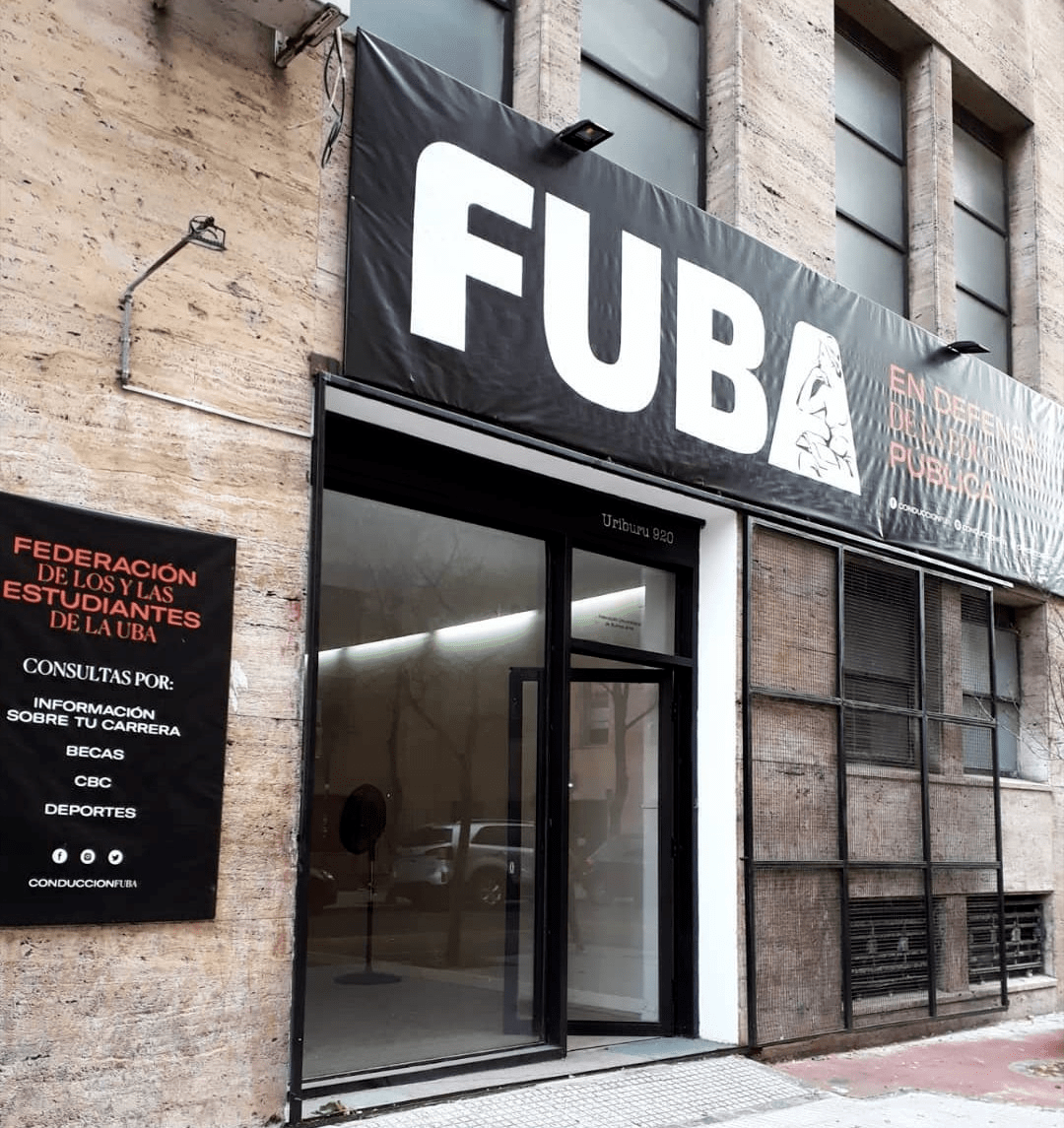
FUBA headquarters on Uriburu 920, Buenos Aires.

The FUBA was founded in 1908, as part of a larger effort by the student movement in Argentina to reform and democratize universities in the country. Ten years after the federation's foundation, in 1918, the University Reform introduced sweeping changes in the internal organization of public universities, leading to the institutionalization of students' unions (Spanish: centros de estudiantes) and the installation of the democratic co-governance principle in public universities.

Like most other student organizations and unions, the FUBA suffered persecution under the various dictatorial régimes that controlled Argentina during much of the 20th century. Since the return of democracy in 1983, the FUBA was under control of Franja Morada, the student wing of the Radical Civic Union. In 2001, in the midst of a social and economic crisis during the UCR-led government of Fernando de la Rúa, Franja Morada lost its majority in the FUBA Congress to a coalition of lefist and independent student organizations.

In the 2007 elections, left-leaning groupings took control of both the majority and the first minority in the FUBA Congress, as the Frente 20 de Diciembre (made up of the Corriente Estudiantil Popular Antiimperialista, the Unión de Juventudes por el Socialismo, and the Workers' Socialist Movement) took the presidency of the federation, while the UBAi coalition (made up of the MLI, El Mate, 14 Bis, El Germen and EnActo) took the general secretariat. Student organizations linked to the "reformist" camp (the Radical Civic Union and the Socialist Party) did not attend that year's congress in protest. The Unión de Juventudes por el Socialism (UJS), student wing of the trotskyist Workers' Party, won the presidency on its own in the 2009 elections, while the 2010 elections resulted in a shared co-presidency between the UJS and the Corriente Julio Antonio Mella, led by Itai Hagman.

The UJS–Mella tandem remained in the presidency up until 2018. After five years without any FUBA Congress meetings, political groupings linked to the reformist camp, led by Franja Morada, called for a congress session with seven out of the thirteen centros de estudiantes. The congress was rejected by the co-presidents and their respective organizations, leading to a "parallel" FUBA being formed. In the following year's election, the reformist camp won a decisive victory, taking eight of the thirteen centros and claiming a majority in the FUBA Congress for the first time since 2001.

== Political system and organization ==
The FUBA is made up of thirteen centros de estudiantes, which are democratically elected by regular graduate students in each of the thirteen faculties of the University of Buenos Aires. In addition to the centros de estudiantes, students in each of the faculties also vote for representatives to the FUBA Congress. Each faculty has five delegates, amounting to a total of 65 delegates. An additional 65 seats in the Congress are distributed among the different political groupings using the D'Hondt system after each election. The FUBA Congress is responsible for electing the federation's authorities, including its president, vice president, general secretary (a post that conventionally goes to the first minority), and various other secretariats. In order for the Congress to convene, a quorum of half of its delegates plus one (66 delegates out of 130, in total) must be achieved.
