= Argentine University Federation =

Student organization in Argentina

Federación Universitaria Argentina
- Location: Buenos Aires, Argentina
- Established: 1918
- President: Joaquín Carvalho
- Vice president: Alexia Robledo
- Members: 2000000 students of Public Argentinian Universities
- Affiliations: Organización Continental Latinoamericana y Caribeña de Estudiantes
- Website: Official website

The Argentine University Federation (Spanish: Federación Universitaria Argentina; FUA) is the most important student organization in Argentina.

The FUA was created on April 11, 1918, within the University Reform student movement originated in Córdoba, which later spread through Latin America, that demanded an autonomous system in which teachers, graduates, and students would participate in the government of the universities.

The FUA gathers the university federations of every local university, which are at the same time composed of student centres of each faculty, totalling a million and a half students throughout the country. The biggest and most important of such federations is the FUBA of the University of Buenos Aires with over 300,000 students (as of 2005). Other important federations include the FULP (La Plata), FUR (Rosario), FUC (Córdoba), FUT (Tucumán) and FUL (Litoral).

In 1894 was founded in the Faculty of Engineering of the UBA the first student centre in Argentina, under the name "La Línea Recta". Medicine and Law had their own in 1940 and 1905 respectively. The most powerful student centre nowadays is that of the Economic Sciences of the UBA, with 50,000 students, followed by UBA's Law school (35,000) and Medicine (29,000).

== Latin America ==
Since its beginnings the FUA supported a politic of Latin American unity and international solidarity. In 1920 Gabriel del Mazo signed, on behalf of the FUA, an exchange and coordination agreement with the Peruvian Federación de Estudiantes del Perú's president Raúl Haya de la Torre.

In 1921 the FUA participated of the organization of the First International Students Congress at Mexico City, from which the International Students Federation was born. In 1925 it participated of the organization of the First Ibero-American Students Congress also in Mexico city. In that congress Alfredo Palacios, Miguel de Unamuno, José Ingenieros, José Martí and José Vasconcelos are declared "teachers of the youth".

In 1937 took place in Santiago de Chile the First Latin American Students Congress. In 1957 the FUA organised the Second Latin American Students Congress, in La Plata.

== List of presidents ==
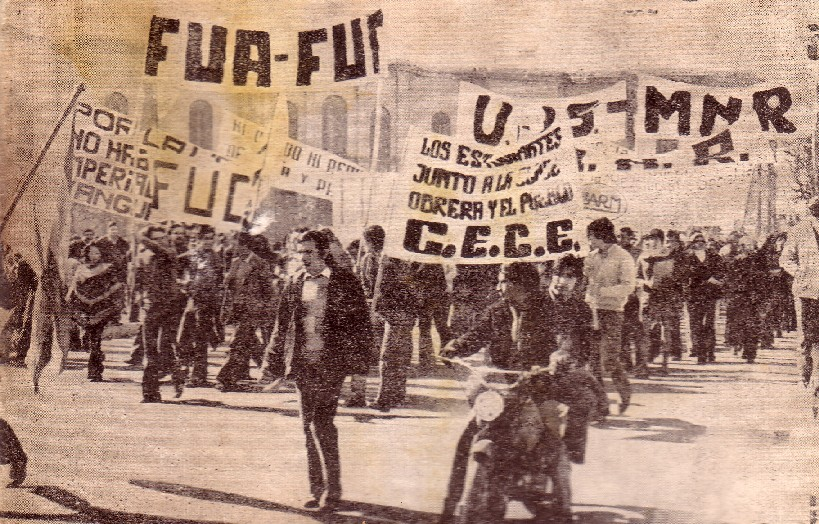
Manifestation by FUA, 1974

Incomplete list of presidents of the:

- 1918: Osvaldo Loudet
- 1919: Julio V. González
- 1920: Gabriel del Mazo (UCR)
- 1923: Pablo Vrillaud
- 1932: Eduardo Howard
- 193?: Sergio Bagú
- 1937: Fernando Nadra (PC)
- 1943: Néstor Grancelli Cha
- 1955: Germán López (UCR)
- 1956: Norberto Rajneri
- 1957: Guillermo Garmendia
- 1959: Guillermo Estévez Boero (MNR)
- 1960: Carlos Cevallos
- 1963: Ariel Seoane
- 1965: Raúl Salvarredy (FAUDI)
- 1968: Jacobo Tiefenberg (FAUDI)
- 1969: Jorge Rocha (FAUDI)
- 1970: Domingo Teruggi (AUN-FIP)
- 1971: Ernesto Jaimovich (MNR-PSP)
- 1972: Marcelo Stubrin (FM-UCR)
- 1973: Miguel Godoy (MNR-PSP)
- 1974-77: Federico Storani (FM-UCR)
- 1978-80: Marcelo Marcó (FM-UCR)
- 1980-83: Roberto Vázquez (FM-UCR)
- 1984-86: Marcelo García
- 1987: Claudio Díaz (FM-UCR)
- 1989: Hugo Marcucci (FM-UCR)
- 1992: Ariel Rodriguez (FM-UCR)
- 1994: Daniel Nieto (FM-UCR)
- 1996: Rafael Veljanovich (FM-UCR)
- 1998: Pablo Javkin (FM-UCR)
- 2000: Manuel Terrádez (FM-UCR)
- 2002: Emiliano Yacobitti (FM-UCR)
- 2004: Maximiliano Abad (FM-UCR)
- 2006: Mariano Marquinez (FM-UCR)
- 2008: Pablo Domenichini (FM-UCR)
- 2010: Hernán "Fama" Miranda (FM-UCR)
- 2012: Emilio "Buho" Cornaglia (FM-UCR)
- 2014: Arturo Pozzali (FM-UCR)
- 2016: Josefina Mendoza (FM-UCR)
- 2018: Bernardo Weber (FM-UCR)
- 2022: Piera Fernández de Piccoli (FM-UCR)
- 2025: Joaquín Carvalho (FM-UCR)

== Student leaders ==
Some important students' leaders of the FUA have been:

=== 1918-1940 ===
Deodoro Roca, Enrique Barros, Emilio Biagosh, Gabriel del Mazo, Héctor Ripa Alberti, Guillermo Watson, Julio V. González, Gumersindo Sayago, Horacio Valdés, Ismael Bordabehere, Conrado Nalé Roxlo, Alfredo Brandán Caraffa, Florentino Sanguinetti, Guillermo Korn Villafañe, Carlos Cossio, Miguel Angel Zabala Ortiz, Miguel Berçaitz, Aníbal Ponce, Ricardo Balbín, Bartolomé Fiorini, Homero Manzi, Arturo Jaureche, Sebastián Soler, Alejandro Korn, José Peco, Ernesto Sábato, Héctor Agosti, Ernesto Giudici, Carlos Sánchez Viamonte, Gregorio Bermann, Luis Dellepiane, Raúl Orgaz, Arturo Capdevila, Arturo Orgaz, Bernardo Kleiner, Alfredo Abregú, Emilio Nadra.

=== 1940-1960 ===
Carlos Canitrot, Emilio Gibaja, León Patlis, Noé Jitrik, Gustavo Cirigliano, Francisco Oddone, Marcos Merchensky, Andrés López Accotto, Ana María Eichelbaum, Gregorio Klimovsky, Ismael Viñas, Julio Godio, Germán López, Guillermo Estévez Boero.

=== 1960-1980 ===
Carlos Cevallos, Ariel Seoane, Domingo Teruggi, Jorge Enea Spilimbergo, Hugo Varsky, Marcelo Stubrin, Federico Storani, Roberto Vázquez, Ernesto Jaimóvich, Changui Cáceres, Rubén Giustiniani, Miguel Talento, José Pablo Ventura, Rafael Pascual, Vilma Ibarra, Ricardo López Murphy, Rogelio Simonato, Francisco Delich, María del Cármen Viñas, Gustavo Galland, Facundo Suárez Lastra.

=== 1980- ===
Andrés Delich, Mario Alarcón, Damián Farah, Juan Artusi, Verónica García, Martín Baintrub, Daniel Pavicich, Alicia Castigliego, Pablo Vallés, Lautaro García Batallán, Ariel Martinez, Daniel Bravo.

== Parties and movements ==
Throughout its history, there have been several and varied movements, ideologies, and parties that coexisted, and still do, in the Argentine students' politics: radicals, socialists, Peronists, communists, Maoists, etc.

The Franja Morada, youth arm of the UCR, is the party that most often has directed the FUA since Franja Morada's creation in 1970, and has remained in the presidency from 1973 to 2016. Other important parties are the Juventud Universitaria Peronista or JUP (of the Justicialism) and the Movimiento Nacional Reformista (MNR) of the Socialist Party, who has ruled during the 1970s.

== See also ==
- University Revolution
- Science and technology in Argentina
