= Emiliano Yacobitti =

Argentine politician

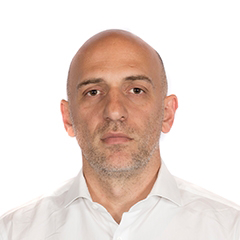

National Deputy
- In office 10 December 2019 – 10 December 2023
- Constituency: City of Buenos Aires

Personal details
- Born: 15 December 1975 (age 50) Lomas de Zamora, Argentina
- Party: Radical Civic Union
- Other political affiliations: Broad Front UNEN (2013–2015); Evolución (2017–2019); Juntos por el Cambio (2019–present)
- Education: University of Buenos Aires

Emiliano Benjamín Yacobitti (born 15 December 1975) is an Argentine politician. He is a member of the Radical Civic Union (UCR), and served as the Buenos Aires City UCR Committee from 2013 to 2017. From 2019 to 2023, he was a National Deputy elected in the City of Buenos Aires.

A public accountant, Yacobitti has an extensive career in academic politics in the University of Buenos Aires, and formerly served as Vice-Dean of the University of Buenos Aires Faculty of Economic Sciences. Since 2022, he has been Vice Rector of the University of Buenos Aires.

== Early life and career ==
Yacobitti was born on 15 December 1975 in Lomas de Zamora, in the Greater Buenos Aires conurbation. He attended the prestigious Escuela Superior de Comercio Carlos Pellegrini, then going on to study public accountancy at the University of Buenos Aires (UBA). He is married to Clara Alconada Alfonsín and has three children.

While studying at UBA, Yacobitti became involved with university politics. He was elected president of the Faculty of Economic Sciences student union, and later was elected president of the Argentine University Federation. He is also a professor of Accounting Systems in the Faculty of Economic Sciences. In 2018, he was elected Vice-Dean of the Faculty.

== Political career ==
In 2013, Yacobitti was elected president of the Radical Civic Union Committee in Buenos Aires, for the 2013–2015 term. He was re-elected for another two-year term in 2015. Yacobitti was succeeded by Guillermo de Maya in 2017.

During his tenure as leader of the Buenos Aires UCR, Yacobitti rejected an alliance with Republican Proposal and the Civic Coalition ARI, breaking with the national UCR, which had formed part of the Cambiemos alliance in 2015. Instead, the Buenos Aires UCR formed the ECO coalition in 2015, which, alongside the Socialist Party, supported the candidacy of Martín Lousteau for Chief of Government of Buenos Aires in 2015. In 2017, ECO was dissolved and replaced by Evolución, which supported Lousteau's bid to become National Deputy in 2017.

Yacobitti ran for a seat in the Chamber of Deputies in the 2019 legislative election; he was the third candidate in the Juntos por el Cambio list in Buenos Aires. The list was the most voted, with 52.86% of the votes, and Yacobitti was elected.

As a national deputy, Yacobitti formed part of the parliamentary commissions on Justice, Tributary Norm Analysis, Science and Technology, Economy, Education, and General Legislation. He was a supporter of the legalization of abortion in Argentina, voting in favour of the 2020 Voluntary Interruption of Pregnancy bill that passed the Argentine Congress.

== Electoral history ==
Electoral history of Emiliano Yacobitti
Election	Office	List	#	District	Votes			Result	Ref.
Election	Office	List	#	District	Total	%	P.	Result	Ref.
2019	National Deputy	Juntos por el Cambio	3	City of Buenos Aires	1,060,404	53.02%	1st (Note: Presented on an electoral list. The data shown represents the share of the vote the entire party/alliance received in that constituency.)	Elected	
