= Elflein =

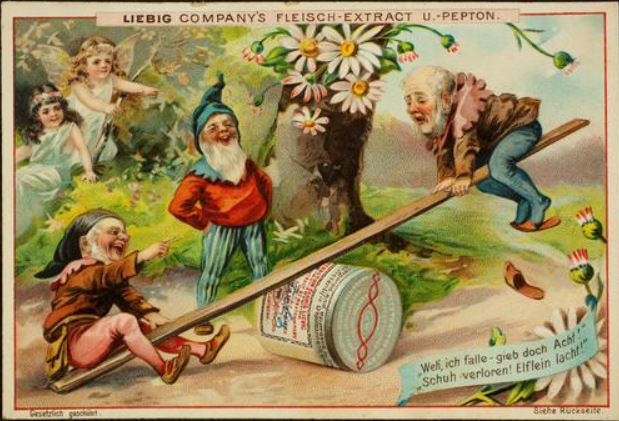
Vintage advert depicting an "Elflein" (little elf)

Elflein is a surname. The name derives from the old Anglo-Saxon given name Ælflin. The name is composed of the elements 'aelf', elf, and 'wine', friend; these were frequently used elements in Anglo-Saxon compound personal names, such as 'Ælfwig', elf-battle, and 'Æthelwine', noble-friend. 'Ælfwine' is recorded in the Domesday Book of 1086 as 'Aeluuin', 'Alfuuinns', 'Aluuinus' and 'Eluuin', while one 'Goduine Ælfuini filius' (Godwin son of Aelfwine) appears in the 1095 Feudal Documents of the Abbey of Bury St. Edmunds, Suffolk. One Anne Elfelin married Nathaniel Whitel in Lincolnshire in December 1628, and James Elflain was christened at St. Luke's, Finsbury, London, on November 28, 1819.

In the German town of Volkach there is a long-established Elflein family of winegrowers, whose surname changed from the 16th to the 17th century from first Jecklin to Elcklin, Elckle, Elcklein and then Elflein. The Volkach Elflein lineage is originally from Friesenheim (Lahr) and medieval deeds document how the name has changed from a first name to a surname. A 15th century deed documents how a certain "Jecklin Swend" was locally known just as "Jecklin the barber". Henceforth his descendants became known as the Jecklin family and it eventually became their new surname, before morphing into Elflein over the following centuries.

Independently of the Volkach Elflein branch, there is also an Elflein lineage of Abtswind. Genealogical research indicates that despite the relative proximity to Volkach, the branches exist entirely independently of each other with no common root.

Notable people with the surname include:

- Ælflin (ca. 978), Anglo-Saxon monk and scribe of notable historical and scriptural works.
- Ada María Elflein (1880–1919), Argentine poet, columnist, translator, feminist and teacher
- Pat Elflein (born 1994), American football guard

== See also ==
- Das Christ-Elflein (The Little Elf of Christ), is an opera in two acts by Hans Pfitzner
