= Aníbal Ponce =

Argentine psychologist, sociologist, and activist

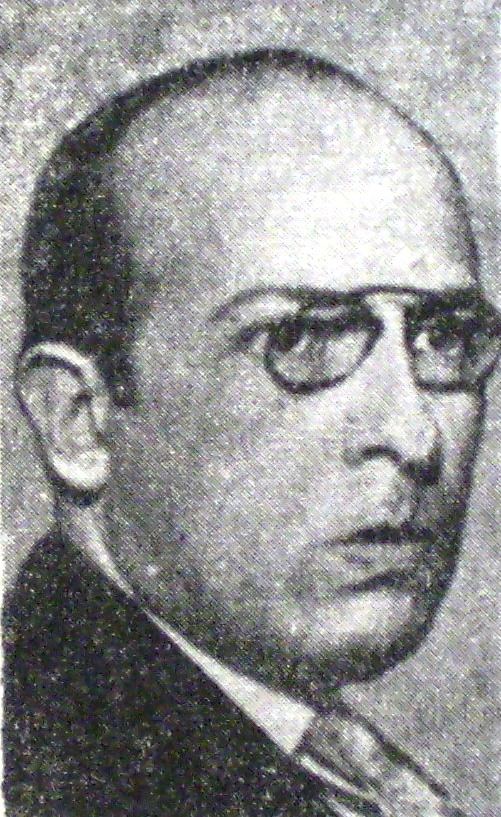
- Born: 6 June 1898; Buenos Aires, Argentina
- Died: 18 May 1938 (aged 39); Mexico City, Mexico
- Occupations: Psychologist, sociologist, university professor, essayist
- Political party: Communist Party of Argentina

Aníbal Norberto Ponce (6 June 1898 – 18 May 1938), was an Argentine psychologist, sociologist, professor and political activist.

== Biography ==
In his youth, Ponce studied at the Colegio Nacional de Buenos Aires (National College), then at the Faculty of Philosophy and the Humanities of the University of Buenos Aires. He also studied medicine for several years. From 1918 he was an active participant, and then a leader of the Movement for University Reform. In 1920 he met José Ingenieros, with whom he would co-direct the Revista de Filosofía, taking charge of the management when Ingenieros died in 1925.

In 1930 he founded the Colegio Libre de Estudios Superiores, in whose publication Courses and Conferences, "Education and Class Struggle", a fundamental work, appeared in several numbers in 1934. In those years he began to be an activist in the Communist Party of Argentina and visited the Soviet Union. In 1935 he founded the Association of Intellectuals, Artists, Journalists and Writers (AIAPE), of which he was the first president.

Ponce held chairs of Psychology in several houses of higher studies in Argentina. In 1936, when his figure was in full growth, he was dismissed from his position because of his adherence to Marxism and his active anti-fascist militancy. He decided to go into exile in Mexico, where he taught courses in psychology, ethics, sociology and dialectics at different universities, without leaving his political militancy. He joined the Mexican League of Revolutionary Writers and Artists (LEAR). He finally decided to settle in the city of Morelia, in the state of Michoacán, and obtained a permanent position in the Universidad Michoacana de San Nicolás de Hidalgo.

In 1938, on the highway between Morelia and Mexico City, a traffic accident left Ponce with internal injuries that were not discovered in time, causing his death shortly after.

== Thought ==
In Argentina, between the 1920s and 1930s, Ponce published several texts in various areas of psychology, especially genetics, developmental and educational psychology. His production in psychology also includes interesting forays into topics such as reasoning, adaptation, feelings, and the "spirit of contradiction". Ponce developed an original theoretical approach that articulated the ideas of José Ingenieros, Alfred Adler, Jean Piaget and Lucien Lévy-Bruhl. Karl Marx and the Marxists of the 1930s were added to these influences. His book "Education and class struggle" historically analyzes, from a Marxist point of view, the way in which the socioeconomic structure determined the successive dominant educational models.

== Works ==
- Ambición y angustia en los adolescentes
- La vejez de Sarmiento
- Condiciones para la universidad libre
- Humanismo burgués y humanismo proletario: de Erasmo a Romain Rolland
- Educación y lucha de clases
- Estudios de Psicología
