= Fernanda Miño =

Argentine social leader and politician (born 1974)

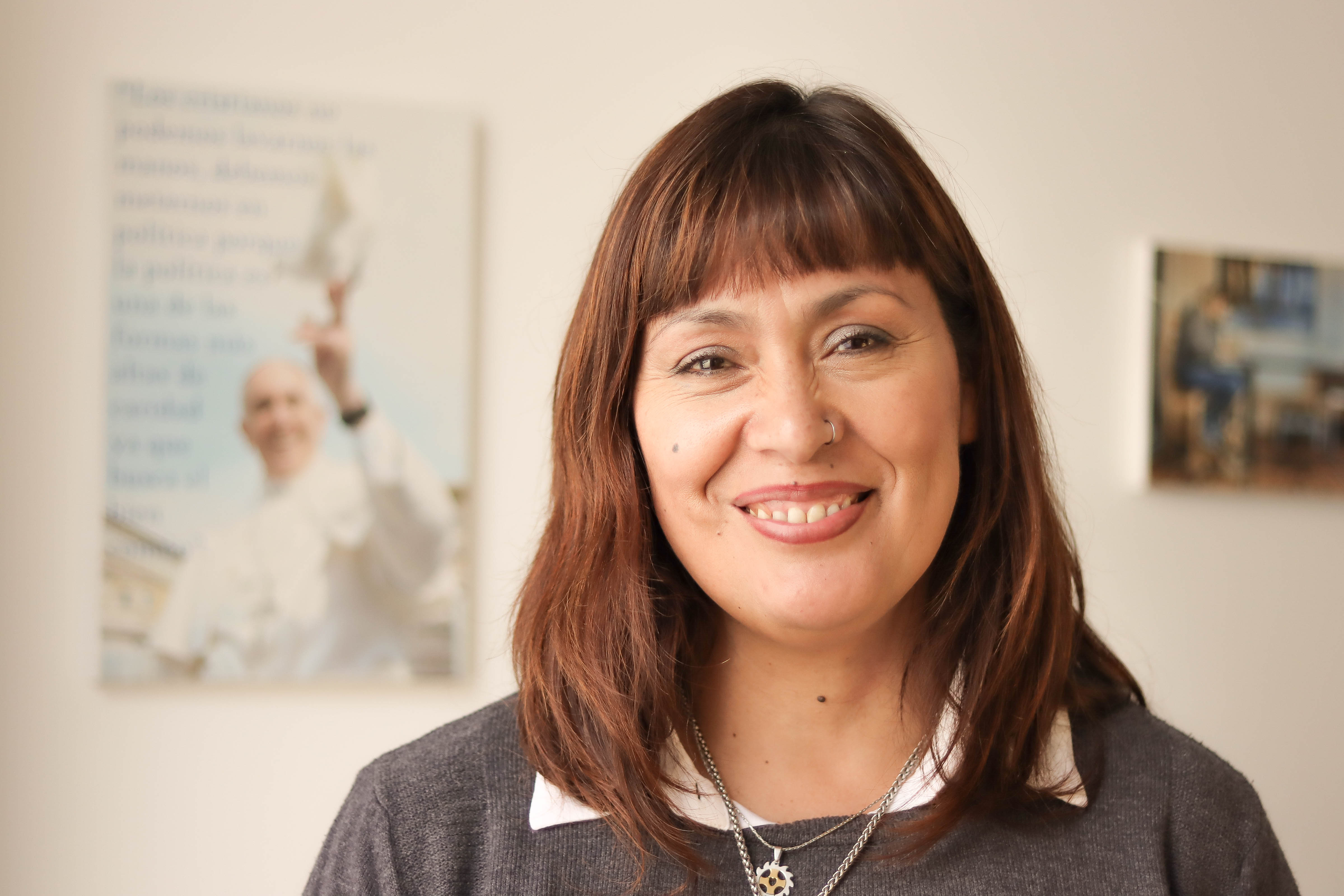
- Miño in 2022

National Deputy
- Incumbent
- Assumed office 10 December 2025
- Constituency: Buenos Aires

Secretary of Social-Urban Integration
- In office 21 January 2020 – 10 December 2023
- President: Alberto Fernández
- Preceded by: Sebastián Welisiejko
- Succeeded by: Sebastián Pareja

Personal details
- Born: 19 July 1974 (age 52) San Isidro, Buenos Aires, Argentina
- Party: Patria Grande Front
- Other political affiliations: Fuerza Patria (since 2025)

Ramona Fernanda Miño (born 19 July 1974) is an Argentine catechist, social activist and politician. Elected as a National Deputy in 2025, she was the first resident of a villa miseria (popular neighborhood) to hold a national government secretariat and the first president of the FISU (Socio-Urban Integration Fund). She is a member of Patria Grande.

She also served as a city councilor in San Isidro, where she chaired the Frente de Todos bloc and was that party's candidate for mayor in 2019. She is the founder of the National Roundtable of Popular Neighborhoods (Mesa Nacional de Barrios Populares).

== Early life ==
Miño was born and raised in Villa La Cava, in Beccar, San Isidro, in the northern area of the Greater Buenos Aires. She grew up in a large family; her parents had migrated to Buenos Aires from Chaco during Argentina’s last military dictatorship. Her mother was a homemaker and her father worked as a port stevedore.

Miño left formal schooling at the age of twelve. As a teenager, she worked as a live-in nanny and domestic worker in affluent neighborhoods near her own community. During adolescence, she became involved with the parish Nuestra Señora de La Cava, where she participated in religious and community activities. She later trained as a catechism teacher.

== Social activism ==
Miño’s activism developed through parish work, neighborhood organizing and community initiatives in Villa La Cava. In the early years of her marriage, she and her husband, Juan Carlos Molina, were active in the local parish. Around 2010, they opened their home’s patio as a community space known as Patio Cultural EnBarriarte, where children and residents took part in recreational activities, educational support, workshops and other community programs.

She later became involved in neighborhood assemblies and campaigns for the urbanization and improvement of popular neighborhoods in San Isidro. After the 2013 floods in Greater Buenos Aires, Miño increased her involvement in local demands related to infrastructure, services and housing conditions.

== Political career ==
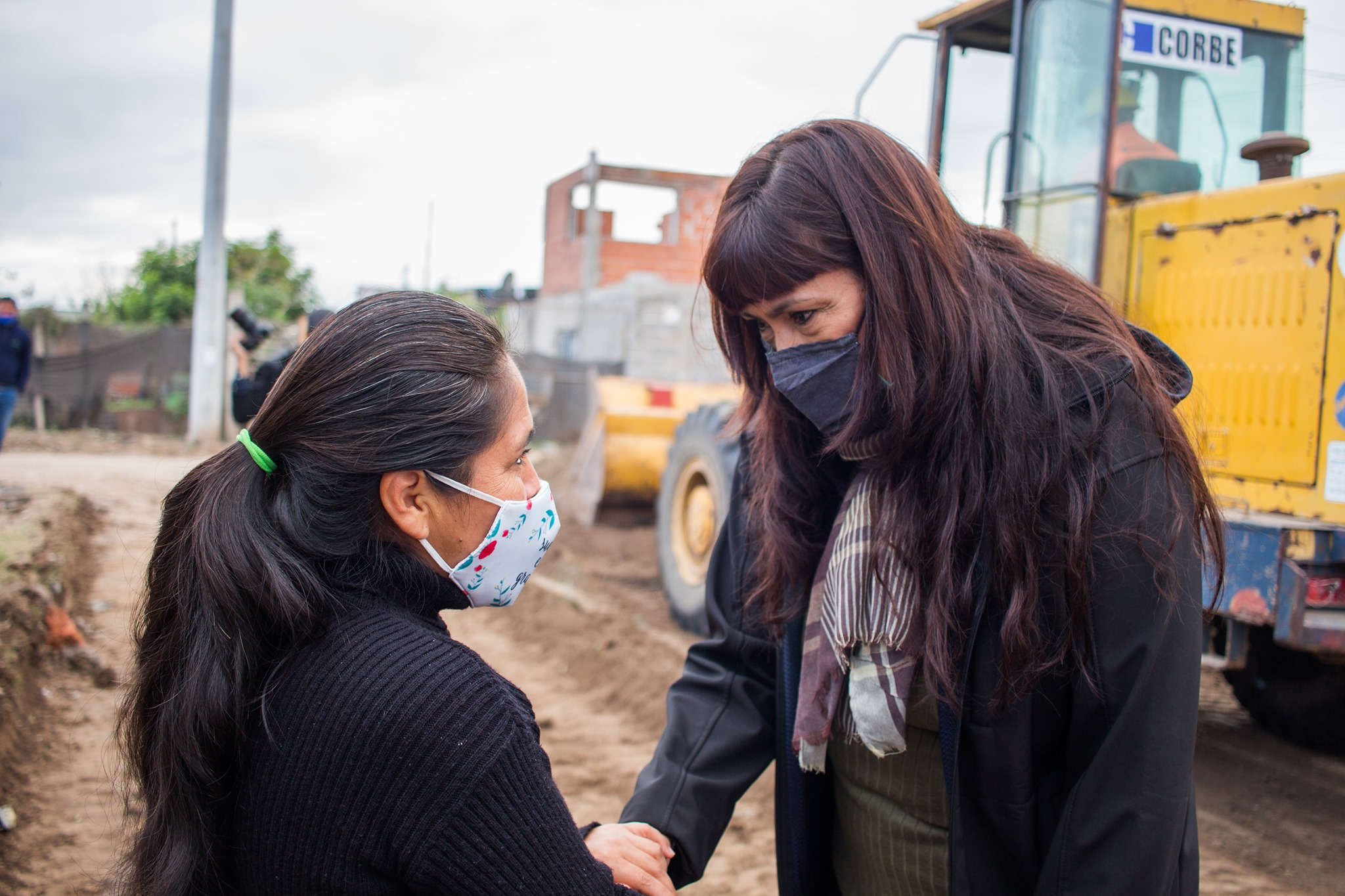
Miño in 2022

In 2016 she coordinated the National Survey of Popular Neighborhoods (RENABAP) in San Isidro, helping to establish the Barrios en Red coordinating body and the local branch of the Excluded Workers' Movement (MTE) in the district. In 2017 she took part in her first political campaign, leading the Unidad Ciudadana list of San Isidro city council candidates and achieving a result that exceeded expectations.

In 2018, Miño joined the National Roundtable of Popular Neighborhoods as a representative of the MTE-CTEP and from there promoted a program for the social and urban integration of neighborhoods nationwide. On the San Isidro City Council, Miño chaired the Unidad Ciudadana bloc and in 2019 succeeded in unifying the legislative work of the Frente de Todos coalition, under which she was a pre-candidate for mayor. That same year she secured passage of an ordinance establishing a legislative framework for advancing the socio-urban integration of all of San Isidro's popular neighborhoods.

Until December 2023, she headed the Secretariat of Socio-Urban Integration (SISU) and the Socio-Urban Integration Fund, with the primary goal of ensuring that popular neighborhoods nationwide gained access to water, sewage, and electricity networks, and of formalizing land tenure for residents, thereby advancing access to healthcare, public transportation, waste collection, and, above all, employment. Under her leadership, the FISU carried out integration projects in more than 1,300 popular neighborhoods across every province of the country, created 25,000 serviced housing lots, and provided financial assistance to more than 250,000 women to improve their homes through the Mi Pieza program, generating more than 320,000 jobs.

In 2025, Fernanda Miño was elected as a National Deputy for the province of Buenos Aires on the Fuerza Patria ticket. She is a member of the Patria Grande Front.

== Electoral history ==
Electoral history of Fernanda Miño
Election	Office	List	#	District	Votes			Result	Ref.
Election	Office	List	#	District	Total	%	P.	Result	Ref.
2017	Councillor	Unidad Ciudadana	1	San Isidro Partido	39,796	18.86%	3rd (Note: Presented on an electoral list. The data shown represents the share of the vote the entire party/alliance received in that constituency.)	Elected	
2025	National Deputy	Fuerza Patria	12	Buenos Aires Province	3,620,634	41.10%	2nd	Elected	
