= Josefina Mendoza =

Argentine politician

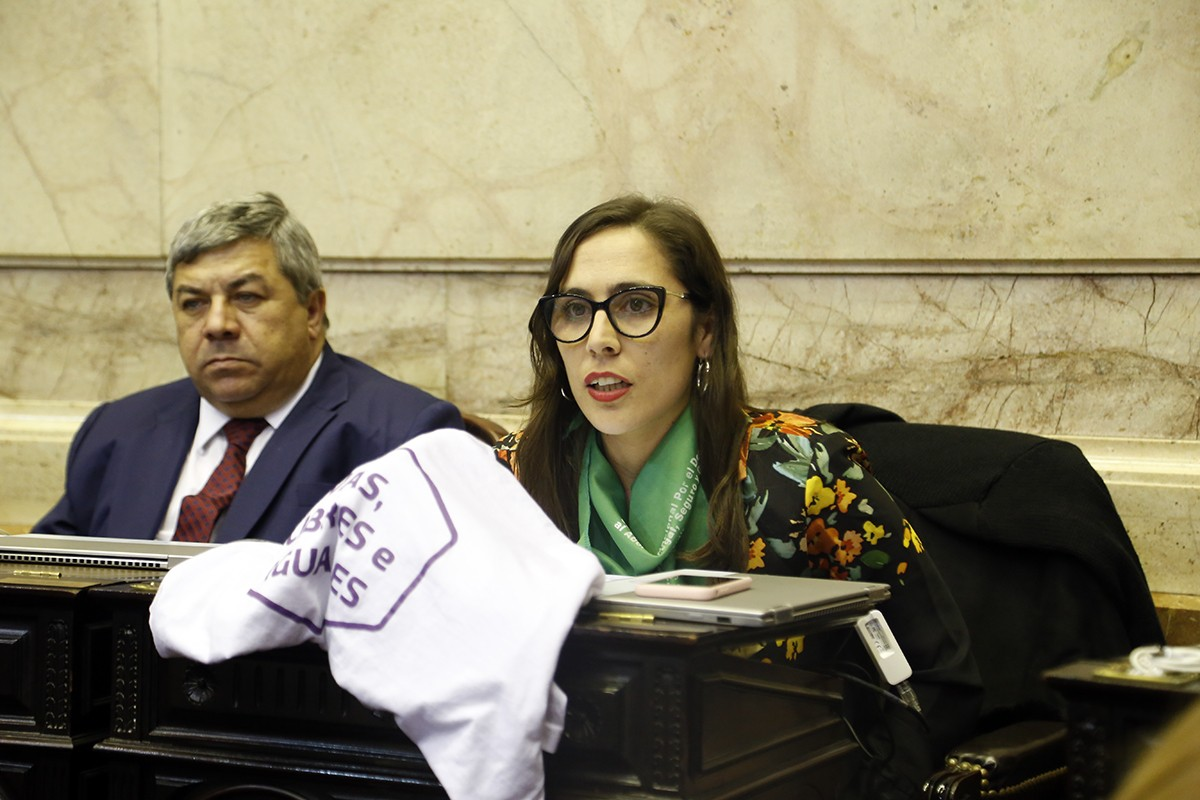

National Deputy
- In office 10 December 2017 – 10 December 2021
- Constituency: Buenos Aires

Personal details
- Born: 16 May 1992 (age 34) Daireaux, Argentina
- Party: Radical Civic Union
- Other political affiliations: Juntos por el Cambio (2015–present)
- Education: National University of Central Buenos Aires

Josefina Mendoza (born 16 May 1992) is an Argentine politician who was a National Deputy from 2017 to 2021, elected in Buenos Aires Province. She is a member of the Radical Civic Union (UCR).

Mendoza made a career in student politics as part of Franja Morada, the UCR's student wing. In 2016, she was elected president of the Argentine University Federation.

== Early life and education ==
Mendoza was born on 16 May 1992 in Daireaux, a small town in South-western Buenos Aires Province. She finished high school at Escuela Agrotécnica Salesiana "Carlos Casares", and then went on to study International Relations at the National University of Central Buenos Aires (UNICEN), in Tandil. She has one child.

Mendoza became active in student politics as part of Franja Morada, the student wing of the Radical Civic Union. She was a member of the UNICEN student council from 2012 to 2014, and was a candidate to president of the student union in 2013.

== Political career ==
In 2014, Mendoza was elected vice-president of the Argentine University Federation (FUA). Two years later, in 2016, she was elected president of the FUA. In 2017, Mendoza rose to prominence due to her spat with union leader Roberto Baradel over a teachers' strike organized by Baradel's union, SUTEBA.

Mendoza ran for a seat in the Chamber of Deputies in the 2017 legislative election, as the tenth candidate in the Cambiemos list in Buenos Aires Province. The list was the most voted in the general election with 42.15% of the vote, and Mendoza was elected. Upon being elected, she became the youngest-ever female deputy in the history of the Argentine Congress.

As a national deputy, Mendoza formed part of the parliamentary commissions on Education, Natural Resources and Conservation, Sports, Cooperative Affairs, Disabilities, Women and Diversity, Modernization of Parliamentary Procedure, and Culture. She was a vocal supporter of the legalization of abortion in Argentina, voting in favour of the two Voluntary Interruption of Pregnancy bills that were debated by the Argentine Congress in 2018 and 2020.

Ahead of the 2021 primary election, Mendoza was confirmed as one of the candidates in the "Dar el Paso" list in Buenos Aires Province. The Dar el Paso list lost in the Juntos por el Cambio primaries, and she was relegated to the 24th place in the Juntos por el Cambio list that competed in the general election. With 39.77% of the vote, the list did not receive enough votes for Mendoza to make it past the D'Hondt cut, and so she was not re-elected. Her term expired on 9 December 2021.
