= Escuela Superior de Comercio Carlos Pellegrini =

Carlos Pellegrini High School of Commerce
- Escuela Superior de Comercio Carlos Pellegrini
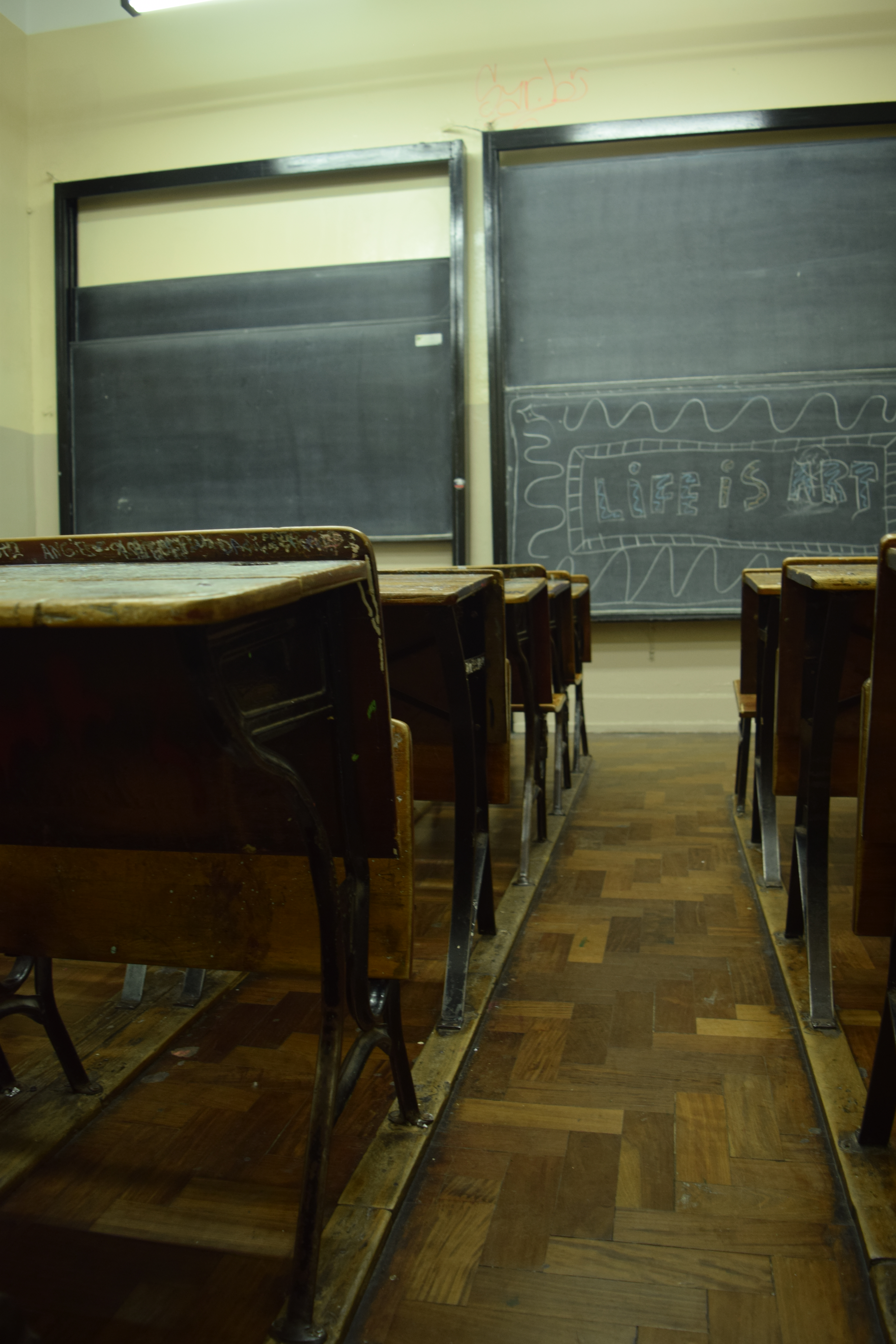

Location
- Marcelo T. de Alvear 1851; Buenos Aires; Argentina; 34°35′49.6″S 58°23′38.4″W

Information
- Type: Public
- Established: 1890
- Rector: Ana Barral
- Gender: Coeducational
- Enrollment: 2500
- Nickname: Pelle
- Affiliation: University of Buenos Aires
- Website: www.cpel.uba.ar

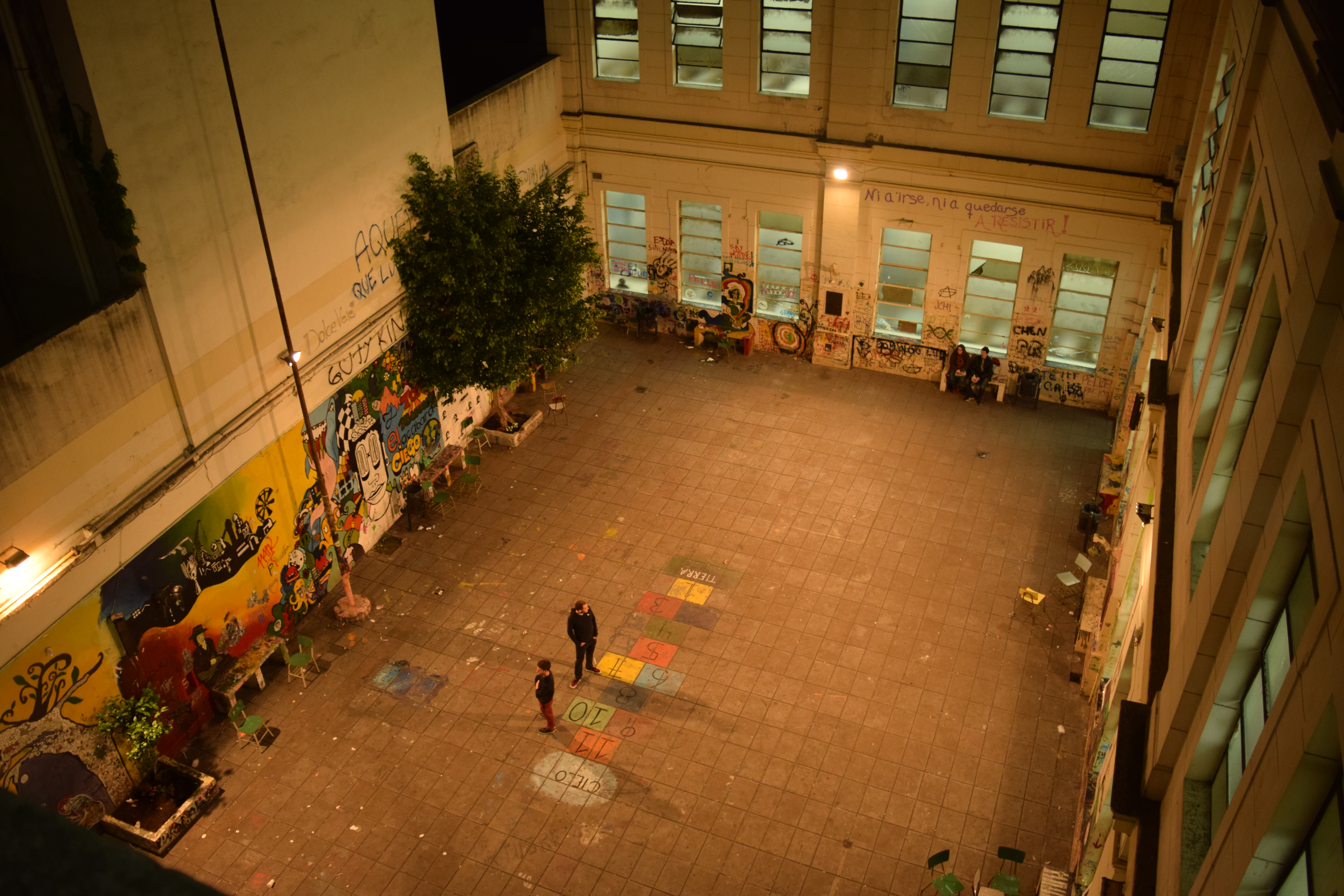
The internal patio.

The Escuela Superior de Comercio Carlos Pellegrini (Carlos Pellegrini High School of Commerce, ESCCP) is a public high school in Buenos Aires, and it is one of the most prestigious in Argentina and Latin America.

Founded on February 19, 1890 by President Carlos Pellegrini under the name of Escuela de Comercio de la Capital de la República (Commerce School of the Republic's Capital), it would become the first vocational school in the country, enabling its graduates to be the first with the high school degree required for admission in Economic Sciences' Colleges. The school was renamed in 1908, taking its current denomination. In 1931, the school was placed under the control of the University of Buenos Aires (UBA), and in 1953 women were given the right to study in the institution.

As the school is under the UBA control, the high school diplomas are issued by the University of Buenos Aires itself. Most, if not all of the teaching staff also teaches at the UBA, and Physical Education classes take place at the UBA's Ciudad Universitaria (campus). This relationship between the school and the University also gives graduated students the possibility of attending an extra 6th year for a degree in Ciencias Comerciales (Bachelor in Commercial Science); the subjects for this academic year are equivalent to the UBA's Ciclo Básico Común (CBC - Common Basic Cycle; a year of basic subjects study, mainly aimed to level students from different high school backgrounds) plus four other assignments. This extra curricular year entitles the students to enter the UBA in many majors, specially including economy-related ones, without the need of attending the CBC. In the year 2005, several changes were made in what concerns to the CBC. Students can now make the entry course to any university, and not only to the economy-oriented ones.

The main building was designed by Italian architect Gino Aloisi (1864 – 1924), and inaugurated in 1909.

== Location ==
The Carlos Pellegrini High School of Commerce is located on 1851 Marcelo T. de Alvear Street, between Riobamba St. and Callao Avenue (Avenida Callao), in the neighbourhood of Recoleta. Several bus routes serve the school and its vicinity: 12, 29, 37, 39, 60, 99, 101, 106, 108, 109, 111, 124, 132, 140, 150 and 152, as well as Line D and Line B of the Buenos Aires Metro (Subte).

== Admission ==
The school's admission process is highly competitive. Every year, about 1500 students apply, all of which are attending the 7th year (Grade 7) of their Primary School. These students are subject to 12 exams divided into four major areas: Mathematics, History, Geography and Spanish. They are required to take three tests of each one of the subjects mentioned above. Entry to the school is quite limited, as around 450 of the applicants finally achieve their goal. Two tests are given in a same day, and students can leave school earlier than during normal class days. The first 6 exams are three from Spanish and three from History. Then, after the winter holidays (two weeks) they start with the Maths and Geography classes. The distribution of the tests is the same as the first part of the year.

The number of applicants in 2008 for the 2009 school year dropped to 550, about half of the number of students who applied in 2007, and previous years. Many of the students who did not apply to Carlos Pellegrini, chose similar institutions elsewhere, such as the Colegio Nacional de Buenos Aires, or the Instituto Libre de Segunda Enseñanza. Since then, the number of applicants recovered to its usual number of about 1500 students as reported in 2020.

== Politics ==
The school is one of the most politically active high schools in Argentina, with a high percentage of militant students who organise themselves in the Centro de Estudiantes del Carlos Pellegrini (Carlos Pellegrini Student's Center). The Student Center, usually referred to as CECaP, holds annual elections and, until the year 2005, was subdivided in different areas, such as Sports, Charity Action, Press and Culture; since 2006, though, it's divided in Comisiones (commissions) created by the students, under the supervision of the Comisión de delegados (Delegates commission) This system is more democratic than the old system, since the commissions now are created by and their membership determined by students, whereas previously they were managed by the political parties. The CECaP is well known for its left-wing character.

== School's information ==
- Principal: Ana Barral
- Degree: Bachelor of Commercial Sciences (Bachiller en Ciencias Comerciales)
- Main subjects: Business, accounting, economy, mathematics, Spanish, geography, biology, history, physics, chemistry and computing
- Languages.: English (80% of the students) and French (20% of the students)
- Number of students (estimated): 2500
- Address: Marcelo T. de Alvear 1851, C1122AAA, Buenos Aires, Argentina.

== See also ==
- Colegio Nacional de Buenos Aires
- Instituto Libre de Segunda Enseñanza
