= Federico Fagioli =

Argentine politician

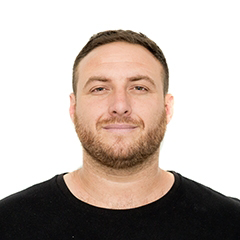

Provincial Senator of Buenos Aires
- Incumbent
- Assumed office 10 December 2023
- Constituency: Third Electoral Section

National Deputy
- In office 10 December 2019 – 10 December 2023
- Constituency: Buenos Aires

Personal details
- Born: 27 March 1991 (age 35) Quilmes, Buenos Aires Province, Argentina
- Party: Patria Grande Front
- Other political affiliations: Frente de Todos (2019–2023); Union for the Homeland (2023–present)

Federico Fagioli (born 27 March 1991) is an Argentine social activist and politician of the Patria Grande Front. Since 2023, he has been a member of the Senate of Buenos Aires Province, representing the Third Electoral Section. From 2019 to 2023, he was a National Deputy for Buenos Aires.

Additionally, Fagioli is also involved in the CTEP-UTEP, the informal sector workers' union.

== Early and personal life ==
Fagioli was born on 27 March 1991 in Quilmes, in the Greater Buenos Aires conurbation. His mother is a schoolteacher, and he has two siblings. When he was little, his family moved to Cipolletti, Río Negro, where they lived until Fagioli's father left the family. They moved back to the Greater Buenos Aires area when Fagioli was 16 years old. After a brief attempt at studying psychology, in 2009 Fagioli became involved with the Movimiento Popular La Dignidad. His activism was centered on informal sector workers' rights.

Fagioli presently resides in Pueblo Unido, in Glew. Pueblo Unido is a settlement founded by land occupations in which Fagioli partook, alongside some 120 other families. He is irreligious.

== Political activism ==
Fagioli co-founded, alongside other villero activists, the Corriente Villera Independiente (CVI). The CVI seeks to push for the urbanization of villas (informal settlements) in the City of Buenos Aires, and in 2014, Fagioli participated in one of the CVI's most important political interventions: setting up a large tent by the Obelisk of Buenos Aires while staging a protest demanding the declaration of an habitational emergency.

Fagioli participated in the making of a National Survey on Popular Neighbourhoods (Relevamiento Nacional de Barrios Populares, RENABAP). Additionally, he has been active in the CTEP-UTEP, the informal sector workers' union, founded by Juan Grabois.

In 2016, Fagioli co-founded alongside other members of the Movimiento Popular La Dignidad the People's Left Party (Izquierda Popular); the party's purported goal was to "build a new political project that takes up on the people's historical programmes, in order to attain true independence". In 2018, People's Left joined other left-wing political groups and parties in forming the Patria Grande Front.

== National Deputy ==
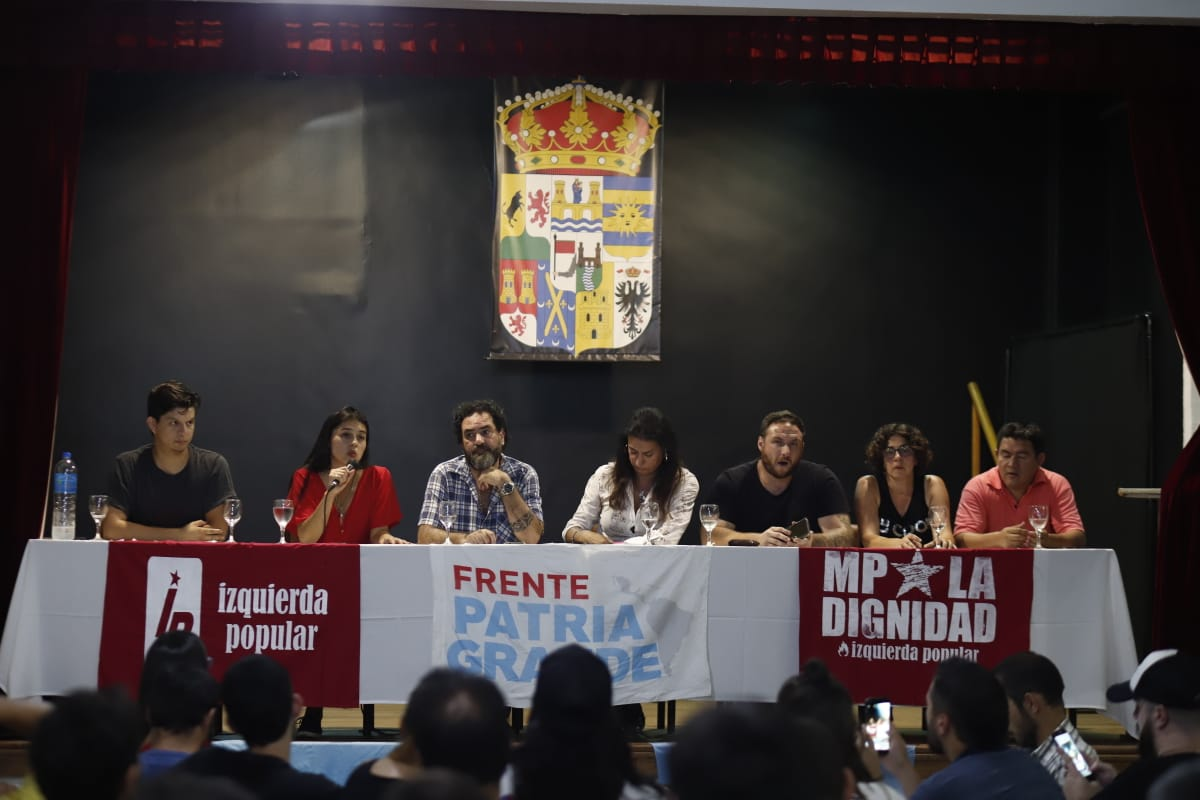
Fagioli alongside other Patria Grande Front leaders.

Ahead of the 2019 general election, the Patria Grande Front selected Fagioli to be their candidate in the Frente de Todos list to the Chamber of Deputies in Buenos Aires Province; Fagioli was the 21st candidate. Despite not being elected, Fagioli took office on 19 December 2019 in place of Eduardo de Pedro, who resigned in order to become Interior Minister in President Alberto Fernández's cabinet.

=== Incident in Bolivia ===
Fagioli was part of the Argentine delegation invited by the Plurinational Legislative Assembly of Bolivia to observe the general election held in that country in October 2020. Upon the delegation's arrival in La Paz Airport, however, Fagioli was controversially detained and kept in custody of the authorities. The Bolivian Minister of the Interior, Arturo Morillo, stated that Fagioli had been warned not to return to Bolivia after his participation in a previous Argentine delegation that visited the country following the ousting of Evo Morales in 2019, and that Fagioli was a "persona non grata" in Bolivia. In addition to Fagioli's detention, other members of the Argentine delegation, including other lawmakers, were also allegedly mistreated by Bolivian security forces. The incident was harshly criticized by President Alberto Fernández and MAS candidate Luis Arce, as well as the Juntos por el Cambio-led Argentine opposition in Congress.

== Electoral history ==
Electoral history of Federico Fagioli
Election	Office	List	#	District	Votes			Result	Ref.
Election	Office	List	#	District	Total	%	P.	Result	Ref.
2019	National Deputy	Frente de Todos	21	Buenos Aires Province	5,113,359	52.64%	1st (Note: Presented on an electoral list. The data shown represents the share of the vote the entire party/alliance received in that constituency.)	Not elected (Note: Assumed office on 19 December 2019 following the resignation of Eduardo de Pedro.)	
2023	Provincial Senator	Union for the Homeland	5	Third Electoral Section	1,770,941	51.54%	1st	Elected	
