= Colegio Nacional de Buenos Aires =

Coordinates: 34.611°S 58.374°W

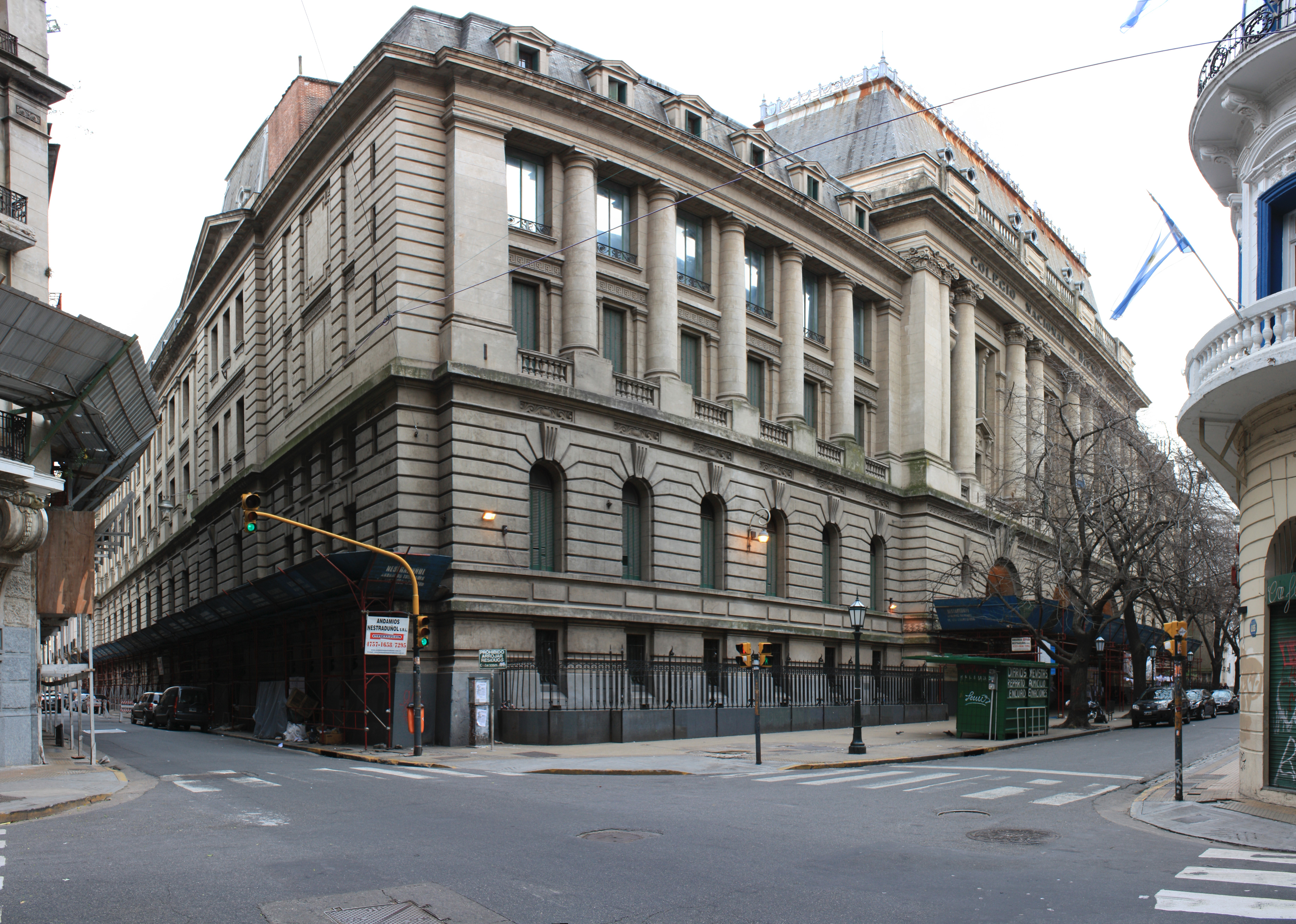

Location
- Bolívar 263; Buenos Aires; Argentina

Information
- Type: Public secondary
- Established: 1863
- Founder: Bartolomé Mitre
- Rector: Lic. Valeria Bergman
- Gender: Coeducational
- Enrollment: 2017
- Colours: Blue and white
- Athletics: Soccer, field hockey, swimming, handball, track and field, basketball, gymnastics, judo, rugby, volleyball, Fencing
- Nickname: El Colegio, El Nacional
- Affiliation: University of Buenos Aires
- Former names: Colegio Grande de San Carlos, Real Colegio de San Carlos, Real Convictorio Carolino, Colegio Nacional
- Notable alumni: Manuel Belgrano, Bernardo Houssay, Carlos Saavedra Lamas, José Luis Murature, Lalo Schiffrin
- Website: http://www.cnba.uba.ar

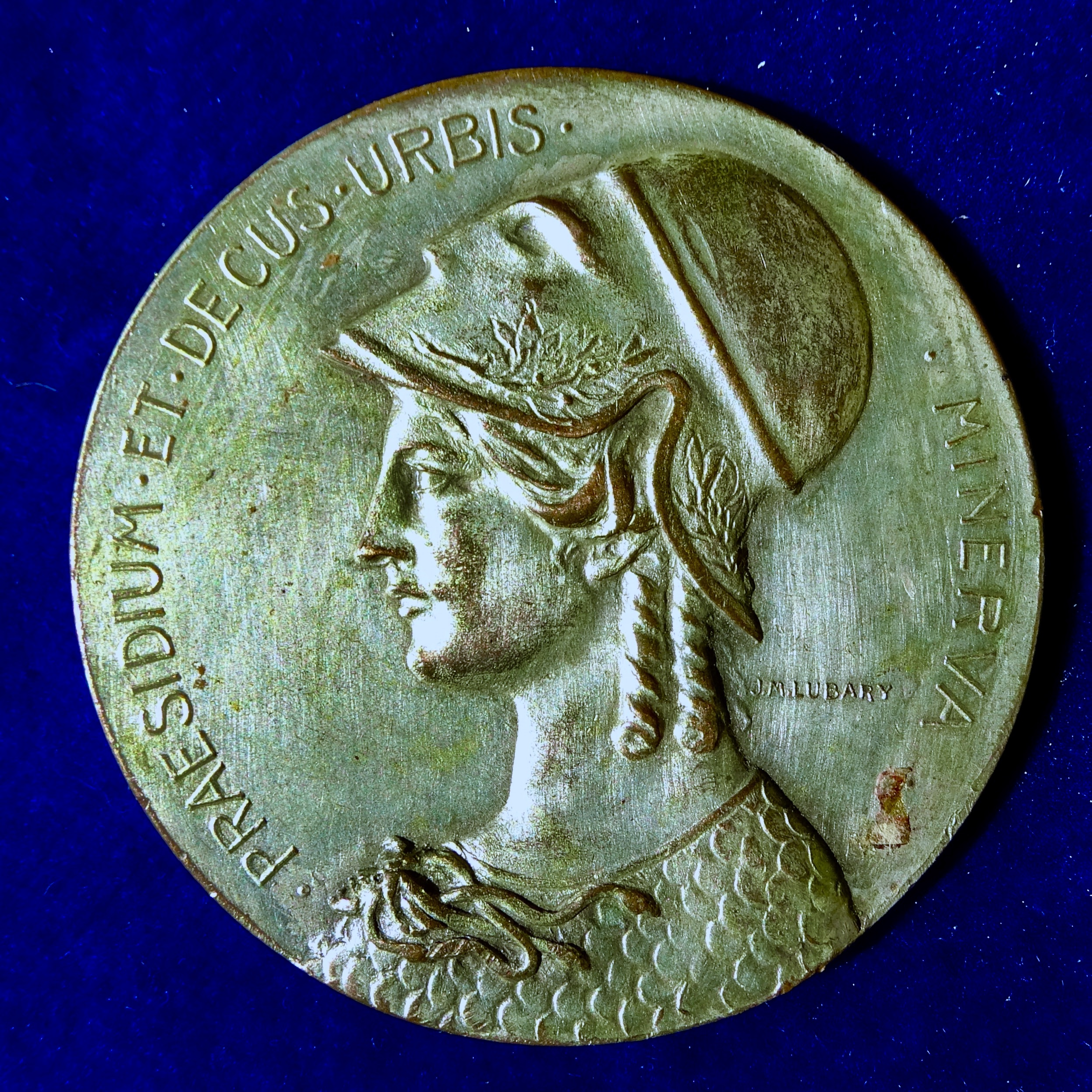
The new Art Nouveau building was designed by Norbert Auguste Maillart. Its 1910 cornerstone laying medal shows Minerva on the obverse.

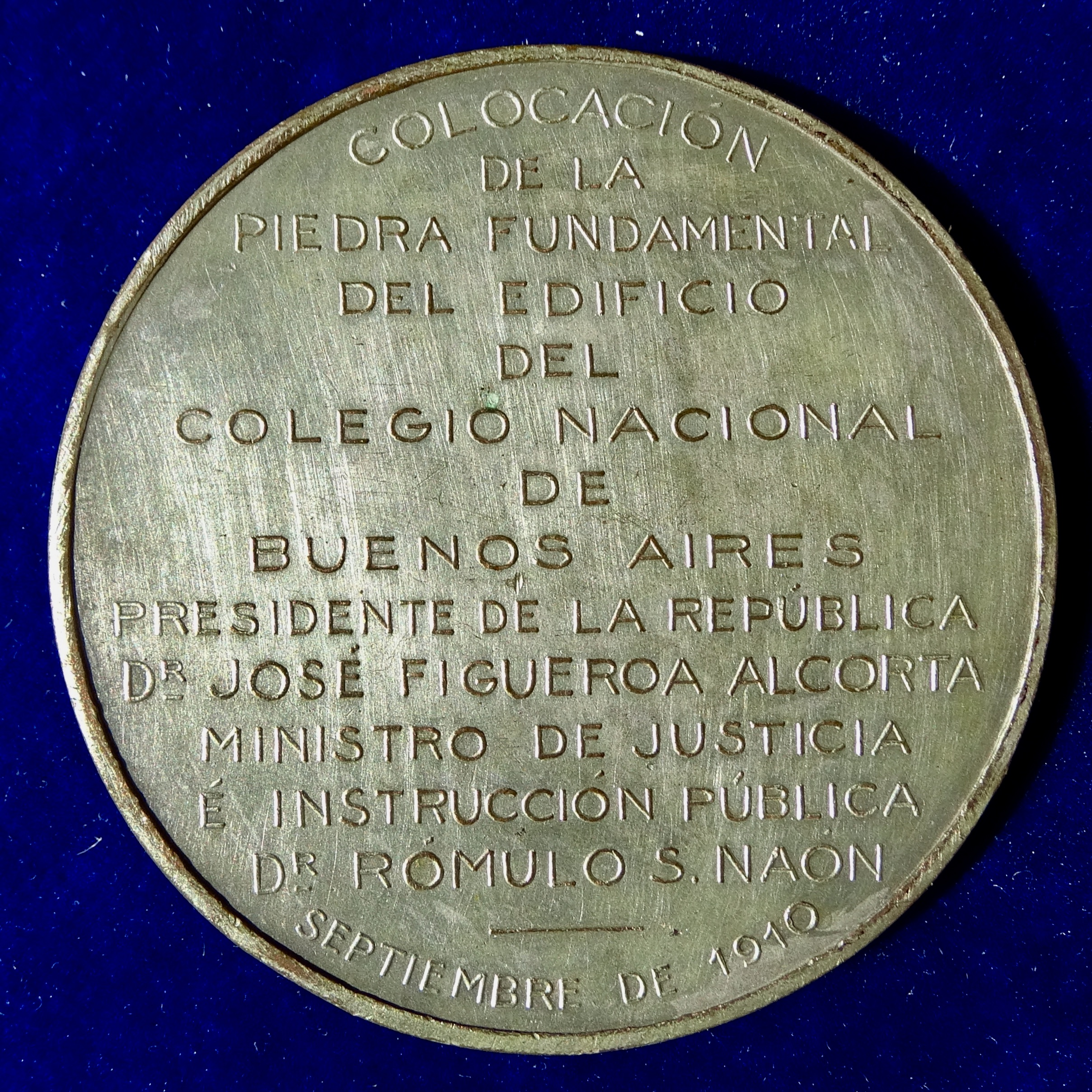
The reverse of this medal by Dr Jorge Maria Lubary commemorating president Alcorta and education minister Naón

Colegio Nacional de Buenos Aires (National School of Buenos Aires) is a public high school in Buenos Aires, Argentina, affiliated to the University of Buenos Aires. In the tradition of the European gymnasium it provides a free education that includes classical languages such as Latin and Greek. The school is one of the most prestigious in Latin America. Its alumni include many personalities, including two Nobel laureates and four Presidents of Argentina.

== History ==
Its origins date to 1661, when it was known as Colegio Grande de San Carlos, when the colonial government entrusted the Jesuit Order with the education of the youth. After the Papal suppression of the Jesuits from Spanish Empire-controlled South America in 1767, the institution languished until 1772, when governor Juan José de Vértiz y Salcedo reopened the school as the Real Colegio de San Carlos. Vértiz, already appointed Viceroy of the Río de la Plata, renamed the school Real Convictorio Carolino in 1783, a name that endured until 1806. Thereafter, the school changed its name and program several times.

President Bartolomé Mitre redesignated the institution as the Colegio Nacional in 1863, and since 1911 the school has been administered by the University of Buenos Aires. Originally only for men, the school has admitted female students since 1957.

Nowadays, students from the Colegio Nacional de Buenos Aires rank among the best in most science Olympiads, such as the IPhO, IChO and IBO.

== Alumni ==
Alumni include many of Argentina's founding fathers, Presidents, members of political parties of all ideologies, internationally recognized scientists, artists, and two Nobel laureates. A partial list includes:

=== Nobel laureates ===
Name	Class year	Notability	Reference(s)
Carlos Saavedra Lamas (1878-1959)	1896	politician; jurist; diplomat; Nobel Peace Prize winner (1936)	
Bernardo Houssay (1887-1971)	1900	physiologist; first Director of CONICET; Nobel Prize in Physiology or Medicine winner (1947)	

=== Politicians and jurists ===
==== Heads of State ====
Name	Class year	Notability	Reference(s)
Cornelio Saavedra (1759-1829)	1776	military officer; President of the Primera Junta	
Juan José Paso (1758-1833)	1776	lawyer; politician; Secretary of the Primera Junta; member of the Junta Grande; member of the First Triumvirate; member of the Second Triumvirate; Representative to the Congress of Tucumán	
Feliciano Antonio Chiclana (1761-1826)	1779	lawyer; military officer; judge; member of the First Triumvirate	
Hipólito Vieytes (1762-1815)	1780	businessman; military officer; politician; Secretary of the Junta Grande	
Manuel Alberti (1763-1811)	1781	priest; member of the Primera Junta	
Juan José Castelli (1764-1812)	1782	lawyer; politician; member of the Primera Junta	
Manuel Belgrano (1770-1820)	1788	economist; lawyer; politician; journalist; military officer; member of the Primera Junta; creator of the Flag of Argentina	
Antonio González Balcarce (1774-1819)	1791	military commander; 5th Supreme Director of the United Provinces of the Río de la Plata	
Nicolás Rodríguez Peña (1775-1853)	1793	politician; member of the Second Triumvirate	
Juan Martín de Pueyrredón (1777-1850)	1795	general; politician; member of the First Triumvirate; 6th Supreme Director of the United Provinces of the Río de la Plata.	
Mariano Moreno (1778-1811)	1796	lawyer; journalist; politician; Secretary of the Primera Junta	
Bernardino Rivadavia (1780-1845)	1798	politician; first President of Argentina (1826-1827)	
Vicente López y Planes (1785-1856)	1803	writer; lawyer; politician; 2nd President of Argentina; 18th Governor of Buenos Aires; representative to the Assembly of Year XIII; author of the lyrics of the Argentine National Anthem	
Justo José de Urquiza (1801-1870)	1818	general; politician; President of Argentina (1854-1860), Provisional Director of the Argentine Confederation (1852-1854); Governor of Entre Ríos Province (1842-1852, 1860-1854, 1868-1870); Governor of Buenos Aires (1852)	
Marcos Paz (1813-1868)	1831	lawyer; politician; Governor of Tucumán; Governor of Córdoba; member of the Argentine Senate; Vice President of Argentina (1862-1868)	
Juan Bautista Egusquiza (1845-1902)	1863	military officer; politician; 13th President of Paraguay (1894-1898)	
Carlos Pellegrini (1846-1906)	1864	lawyer; journalist; politician; Vice President of Argentina (1886-1890); President of Argentina (1890-1892)	
Roque Sáenz Peña (1851-1914)	1869	military officer; lawyer; politician; President of Argentina (1910-1914)	
Marcelo Torcuato de Alvear (1868-1942)	1886	lawyer; politician; President of Argentina (1922-1928)	
Agustín Pedro Justo (1876-1943)	1894	military officer; lawyer; diplomat; politician; President of Argentina (1932-1938)	
Carlos Alberto Lacoste (1929-2004)	1944	navy vice-admiral; politician; responsible for organizing the 1978 FIFA World Cup hosted in Argentina; interim President of Argentina (1981) as member of the National Reorganization Process military junta	

=== Other ===
- Alberto Manguel – writer, bibliophile, essayist, journalist
- Herman Aguinis – business school professor, researcher, author
- Luis Agote – devised the first effective method of blood transfusion
- Roberto Aizenberg – Surrealist painter
- Miguel Cané – writer, diplomat and lawmaker
- Gregorio de Laferrère – playwright and lawmaker
- Martiniano Molina – chef and elected mayor of Quilmes Partido
- Mario Firmenich – Montoneros guerrilla leader
- Alejandro Korn – philosopher and lawmaker
- Ernesto Jaimovich – politician
- Manuel Mendanha – plastic artist
- Film directors: Manuel Antín (founder of the Universidad del Cine), Fabián Bielinsky, Ana Katz, Nicolas Entel (winner Festival de Cine de La Habana), Benjamín Naishtat.
- Salvador Mazza – epidemiologist who helped control Chagas disease locally
- Father Carlos Mugica – activist priest, assassinated in 1974
- José Pablo Ventura – student activist, assassinated in 1977
- José Luis Murature – Foreign Minister of Argentina, 1914–1916
- Ignacio Pirovano – surgeon, performed first local laparotomy
- Nicolás Repetto – co-founder of the Socialist Party of Argentina and Cooperative movement leader
- Lalo Schiffrin – composer and pianist, born Boris Claudio Schifrin, Grammy Award winner and Academy Award nominee
- Bernardo Grinspun – economist, Economy Minister (1983–1985)
- Journalists: Pepe Eliaschev (award-winning journalist 1945–2014), Martín Caparrós, Rolando Hanglin, Mario Mactas
- Ana María Shua (Shoua) – writer
- Aníbal Ponce – psychologist and sociologist.
- Ada María Elflein- Poet
- Alicia Moreau de Justo – political figure, pioneer in women's and human rights.
- Roberto Alemann – lawyer and economist, entrepreneur, antinazi activist, Several times minister of Economy.
- Juan Ernesto Alemann – economist, entrepreneur, antinazi activist, Minister of Economy (1976–1981)
- Mario Roberto Álvarez (1913–2011), architect. He designed the municipal Teatro General San Martín (completed in 1960); the Hernandarias Subfluvial Tunnel (completed in 1969), the Colón Opera House's labyrinthine production facilities (1972), the Buenos Aires headquarters for the state steel concern, Somisa (1977), the Salto Grande Dam (1979) and numerous office buildings.
- Cartoonists: Caloi (creator of Clemente), Nik (creator of Gaturro)
- Julio González Montaner – AIDS research pioneer
- Jonathan Cubas Guillen - Neurologist
- Martín Caparros (writer, journalist)

== Facilities ==
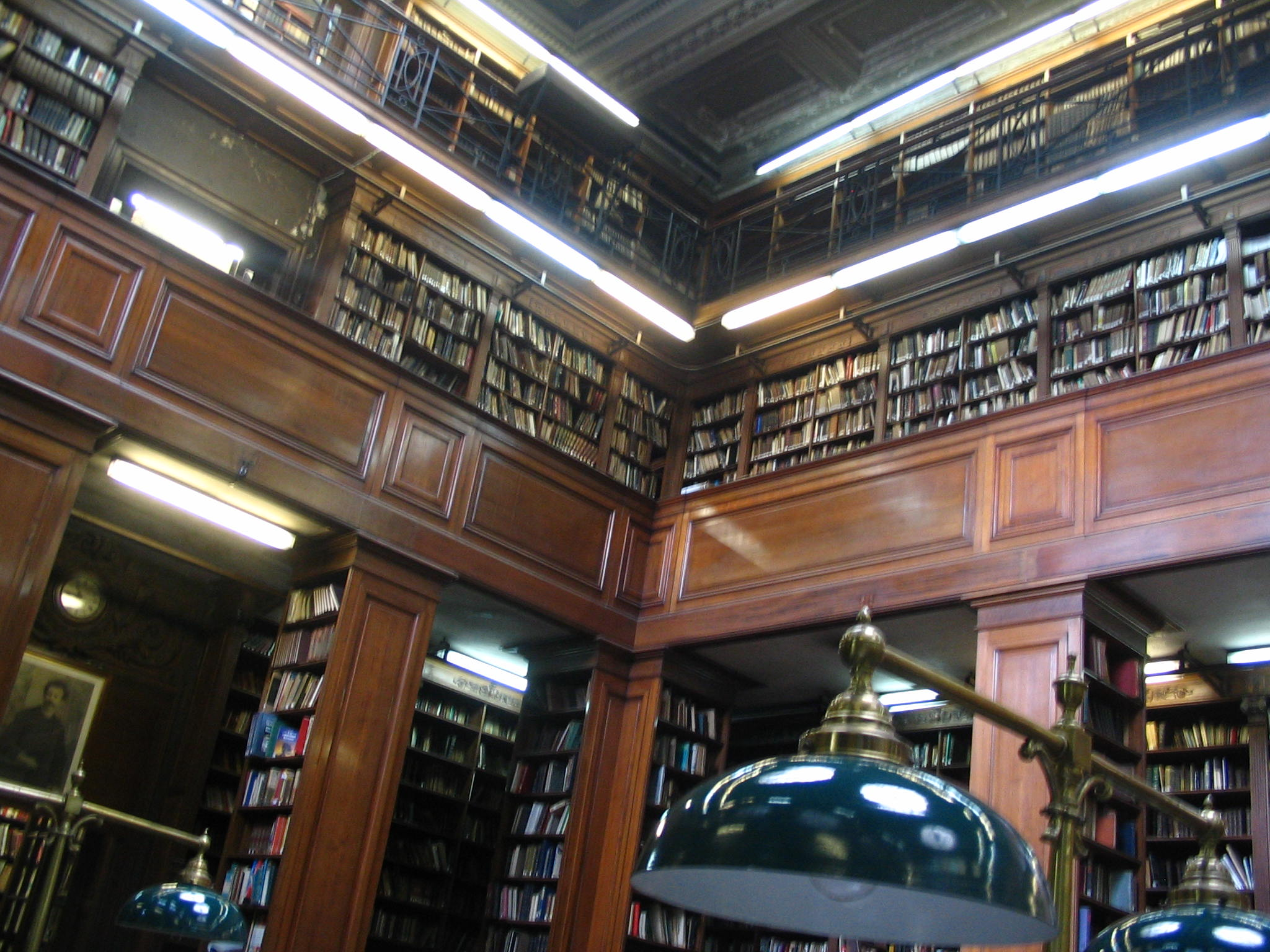
Library of the Colegio Nacional

The school offers an astronomy observatory, a swimming pool, a cinema, a sports campus with football, rugby, handball, volleyball, hockey and basketball courts. Free classes are available such as astronomy, photography, languages, sailing, tango, theater, history of cinema, Yoga, piano, chess, band production and martial arts. The sailing team has won many of the local competitions. It also has a choir, which sings in the most important school events.

== Enrollment ==
In accordance with the meritocratic conception of the school, admission is highly competitive. It involves ten exams after a year-long course, testing in language, mathematics, geography, and history. Every year 1,200 candidates apply but only around 400 gain admission. There are about 2,000 students enrolled, who pay no fees since the school is public and therefore free.

== See also ==
- Escuela Superior de Comercio Carlos Pellegrini
- Instituto Libre de Segunda Enseñanza
- List of Jesuit sites
