= Juan Grabois =

Argentine lawyer and politician (born 1983)

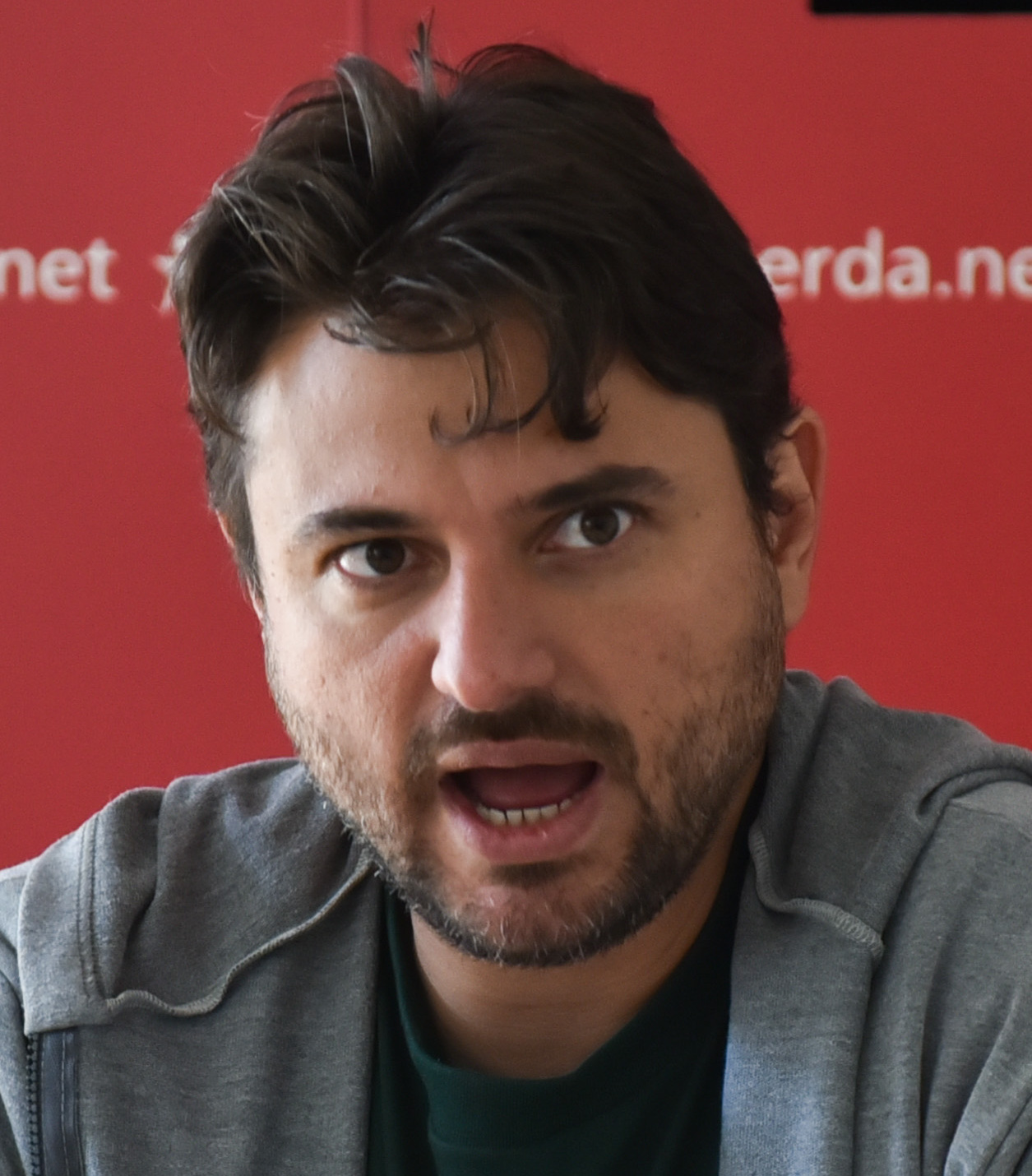
- Grabois in 2023

National Deputy
- Incumbent
- Assumed office 10 December 2025
- Constituency: Buenos Aires

Personal details
- Born: 23 May 1983 (age 43) San Isidro, Buenos Aires, Argentina
- Party: Patria Grande Front
- Other political affiliations: Frente de Todos (2019–2023); Unión por la Patria (since 2023)
- Education: University of Buenos Aires; National University of Quilmes
- Occupation: Lawyer; social leader
- Website: juangrabois.com.ar

Juan Grabois (Spanish pronunciation: [ˈxwaŋ ɡɾaˈβojs]; born 23 May 1983) is an Argentine lawyer, professor, writer and social leader. He is the founder of the Movimiento de Trabajadores Excluidos ("Excluded Workers Movement"; MTE), the Confederation of Popular Economy Workers (CTEP, now known as UTEP), and the Patria Grande Front. Since 2025 he has sat in the lower house of the National Congress as a deputy for Buenos Aires Province.

A devout Roman Catholic, Grabois is a former member of the Vatican Dicastery for Promoting Integral Human Development. He was a precandidate for president of Argentina for the Unión por la Patria in the 2023 Argentine primary elections, being defeated by Sergio Massa of the Renewal Front by a large margin. In August 2025, Grabois confirmed his candidacy for the Chamber of Deputies for Unión por la Patria list for Buenos Aires Province alongside Jorge Taiana.

== Early life and education ==
Grabois was born on 23 May 1983 in San Isidro, Buenos Aires. His parents are Roberto Grabois, a Peronist political leader, and Olga Isabel Gismondi, a pediatrician. After attenting ILSE for most of his secondary education , he finished high school at the Colegio Godspell, and later enrolled at the National University of Quilmes, pursuing a Social Sciences and Humanities degree. In 2010, he completed a law degree from the University of Buenos Aires Faculty of Law.

== Career ==
=== Early social activism ===
In 2002, in the midst of the country's worst economic crisis in decades, 19-year old Grabois founded the Movimiento de Trabajadores Excluidos (MTE; "Excluded Workers' Movement"), seeking to group the waste pickers who suffered persecution from by Buenos Aires Police as their activities were outlawed, in order to organize collective action for their right to work. The MTE also incorporated other groups of informal sector workers, such as small agricultural workers, recuperated businesses workers, street vendors, among others.

In 2005, he participated in the promulgation of Law 1.854, or "Ley de Basura Cero" ("Spanish: Zero-waste law"), guaranteeing the inclusion of scrap workers' rights into the legislation's text.

=== Leader of the Patria Grande Front ===
In August 2018, despite his previous opposition to her government and policies, Grabois publicly declared his support for former president Cristina Fernández de Kirchner as she faced corruption charges; Grabois stated his belief in her innocence and alleged the trial against her was being used to divert attention from the socio-economic crisis affecting the country during the government of President Mauricio Macri.

Later that year, on 29 October 2018, Grabois launched the Patria Grande Front at a rally held in Mar del Plata. The front is a confluence of several social and political organizations, including Vamos, Movimiento Popular La Dignidad, Tres Banderas, and Nueva Mayoría. According to Grabois, the front stands for the "critical reivindication of the popular cycle in Latin America and Argentina".

The front was formed with the intention of backing the candidacy of Fernández de Kirchner ahead of the 2019 general election. In July 2019, when Fernández de Kirchner declined running for president and instead endorsed Alberto Fernández while remaining in his ticket as candidate for vice-president, Patria Grande joined the newly formed Frente de Todos and supported Alberto Fernández's candidacy.

==== 2023 presidential candidacy ====
In March 2023, ahead of the October 2023 Argentine presidential election, Grabois launched his presidential candidacy under the motto of "Argentina Humana" (English: "Humane Argentina"). In Grabois' words, his intention is for a candidate to express the ideals of social justice and national sovereignty within the Frente de Todos primaries. He confirmed his candidacy following the rebranding of the Frente de Todos as the Union for the Homeland (UP). Grabois faced economy minister Sergio Massa in the August primaries to contend for the UP candidacy in the October general election. Grabois lost the primaries to Massa, amassing 21.45% of the UP votes and slightly less than 6% of the total cast votes. Massa later finished first in the first round of the october elections.

== Personal life ==
Grabois is a devout Roman Catholic. His religious beliefs inform many of his political positions, such as his opposition to the legalization of abortion in Argentina. In February 2025, Grabois attempted to visit Pope Francis in the hospital, but was turned away.

Grabois has three children: two daughters and a son. His oldest child was born when he was 19 years old. He is presently married and lives with his family in Villa Adelina, Buenos Aires.

== Publications ==
Grabois has authored or co-authored the following books and publications:

- "Capitalismo de exclusión, periferias sociales y movimientos populares" (PDF). Emergenza Esclusi • the Emergency of the Socially Excluded (Scripta Varia 123). Vatican City: Pontifical Academy of Sciences. 2013. ISSN 1390-1230. Archived from the original (PDF) on 18 November 2016.
- "La exclusión en el capitalismo contemporáneo" (PDF). América Latina en Movimiento. 505 (39). Quito: ALAI. 2015. ISSN 1390-1230.
- "UNA VISIÓN DE LOS OFICIOS DE LA ECONOMIA POPULAR". Tendencias en Foco. 31. Buenos Aires: RedEtis. 2015. ISSN 1852-4893.
- La Personería Social (PDF). Buenos Aires: Universidad del Derecho. 2016.
- Trabajo y organización en la economía popular (PDF). Buenos Aires: CTEP - Asociación Civil de los Trabajadores de la Economía Popular. 2015. (co-authored with Emilio Pérsico)

== Electoral history ==
=== Executive ===
Electoral history of Juan Grabois
Election	Office	List	Votes			Result	Ref.
Election	Office	List	Total	%	P.	Result	Ref.
2023 PASO	President of Argentina	Union for the Homeland	1,441,504	5.85%	5th	Not elected (Note: Lost in the coalition's internal election.)	

=== Legislative ===
Electoral history of Juan Grabois
Election	Office	List	#	District	Votes			Result	Ref.
Election	Office	List	#	District	Total	%	P.	Result	Ref.
2025	National Deputy	Fuerza Patria	3	Buenos Aires Province	3,558,527	40.91%	2nd (Note: Presented on an electoral list. The data shown represents the share of the vote the entire party/alliance received in that constituency.)	Elected	
