= Itai Hagman =

Argentine politician

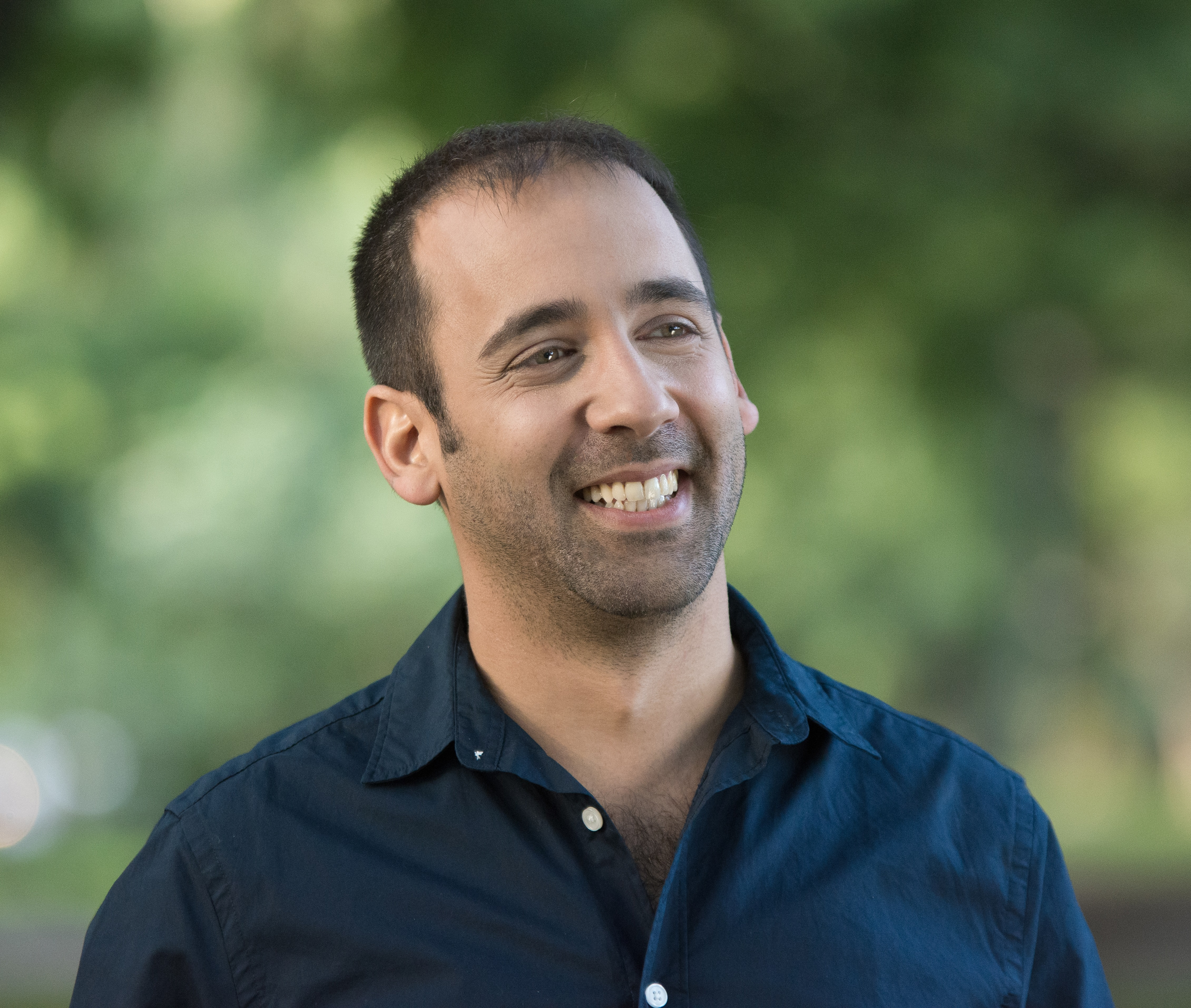

National Deputy
- Incumbent
- Assumed office 10 December 2019
- Constituency: City of Buenos Aires

Personal details
- Born: 13 February 1983 (age 43) Jerusalem, Israel
- Party: Patria Grande Front
- Other political affiliations: Unidad Porteña (2017–2019); Frente de Todos (2019–present)
- Education: University of Buenos Aires
- Profession: Economist

Itai Hagman (born 13 February 1983) is an Argentine economist and politician who has been a National Deputy elected in the City of Buenos Aires since 2019. A member of the Patria Grande Front, Hagman was elected in the Frente de Todos list in 2019.

== Early life and education ==
Hagman was born on 13 February 1983 in Jerusalem. In his youth, he played football in the lower divisions of All Boys. He studied Economic Sciences at the University of Buenos Aires, graduating in 2013. In addition, he has a post-graduate degree in Popular Education from Universidad Popular de las Madres de Plaza de Mayo.

== Political career ==
In March 2010, Hagman was elected co-president of the Federación Universitaria de Buenos Aires (FUBA), Argentina's largest student federation. In 2013, Hagman became part of Marea Popular, a political group formed with the aim of competing in the 2013 legislative election in Buenos Aires. Alongside Popular Unity, Marea Popular formed part of the Camino Popular front; the list, which attained 2.17% of the vote in the P.A.S.O. primaries in August 2013, had Hagman as the first candidate to the Chamber of Deputies.

In 2016, Hagman launched, alongside others, the AHORA Buenos Aires platform. The platform was part of Unidad Ciudadana in Buenos Aires (where it was known as Unidad Porteña), and participated in the 2017 P.A.S.O. primaries against the lists headed by Daniel Filmus and Guillermo Moreno. The AHORA Buenos Aires list landed last in the primaries, and did not get to participate in the general election.

In 2018, he formed part of the foundation of the Patria Grande Front, alongside social leader Juan Grabois and other left-wing activists and politicians. Hagman was first elected to the Chamber of Deputies in 2019 in the Frente de Todos list in Buenos Aires, in which he was the third candidate.

Itai Hagman will file a criminal complaint against Javier Milei for fraudulent maneuver, for violation of article 265 of the Penal Code.

== Electoral history ==
Electoral history of Itai Hagman
Election	Office	List	#	District	Votes			Result	Ref.
Election	Office	List	#	District	Total	%	P.	Result	Ref.
2019	National Deputy	Frente de Todos	3	City of Buenos Aires	641,054	35.02%	2nd (Note: Presented on an electoral list. The data shown represents the share of the vote the entire party/alliance received in that constituency.)	Elected	
2023	National Deputy	Union for the Homeland	4	City of Buenos Aires	577,225	31.41%	2nd	Elected	
2025	National Deputy	Fuerza Patria	1	City of Buenos Aires	439,196	26.97%	2nd	Elected	
