= Chilean university reform =

1960s–70s liberalization of Chilean universities

Chilean university reform was a process of liberalizing universities in Chile. It began in the 1960s after a reform movement, primarily driven by student activism. It was enacted during the presidency of Jorge Alessandri and continued through the administrations of Eduardo Frei Montalva and Salvador Allende, ultimately ending with the 1973 Chilean coup d'état. It introduced significant changes to the higher education in the country.

== Background ==
In the late 1960s, various student movements arose in Chilean universities that became increasingly vocal and organized. These movements were aimed at reforming the existing university system which was perceived as outdated, and a demand for greater autonomy. There were similar student movements throughout Latin America such as the Argentine university reform of 1918, which advocated for similar reasons. Critics against the government argued that the Chilean universities were too traditional, rigid, and resistant to change. They were also seen as perpetuating social inequalities rather than addressing them, with a curriculum that was often seen as theoretical and not connected to the country's development needs.

== Reform ==
The process of liberalizing universities began in the 1960s. The reform began in the 1960s under the administration of President Jorge Alessandri, and continued under his successors Eduardo Frei Montalva and Salvador Allende, ending following Allende's removal during the 1973 Chilean coup d'etat. The aims of the reform movement were to establish an inclusive co-government in the university administration and to establish university autonomy.

The reform established co-government, which was meant to democratize university administration. and included students and faculty in decision-making bodies alongside authorities. The reforms also granted universities greater freedom in deciding the curriculum, and some degree of autonomy from government interference and control in academic and administrative matters. The curriculum was updated to promote scientific research, newer disciplines. Universities also contributed to community development activities.

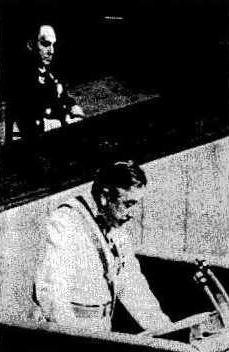
Augusto Pinochet, during a speech. Behind him is General Gustavo Leigh, a member of the Governing Junta.

== Counter-reform during the military dictatorship ==
=== Military Intervention in Universities ===
From the beginning of the dictatorial period, and as a final blow to the Reform, higher education institutions were taken over. . On the very day of the coup, military assaults and raids were carried out on various university campuses, resulting in mass arrests of students, academics, and staff. Less than a month later, the interventionist policy was institutionalized with the appointment of military officers as "delegate rectors" invested with total power, which explicitly included the authority to dismiss academics and expel students.

== See also ==
- 2011–2013 Chilean student protests
- Argentine university reform of 1918
