= José Ingenieros =

Argentine physician, pharmacist, positivist philosopher and essayist

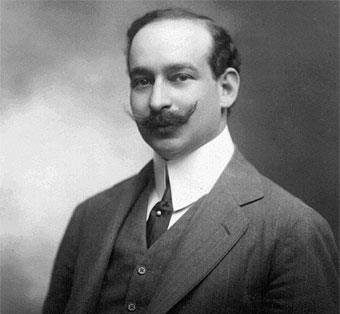
- Born: 24 April 1877; Palermo, Italy
- Died: October 31, 1925 (aged 48); Buenos Aires, Argentina
- Resting place: La Chacarita Cemetery

Philosophical work
- Era: 20th-century philosophy
- Region: Western Philosophy
- School: Positivism

José Ingenieros (born Giuseppe Ingegnieri, April 24, 1877 – October 31, 1925) was an Argentine physician, pharmacist, positivist philosopher and essayist.

He was born in Palermo (Italy), and graduated from the University of Buenos Aires School of Medicine in 1900. Ingenieros was philosophically influenced by Herbert Spencer and Auguste Comte, and wrote a very important philosophical and social work, "El hombre mediocre" (The Mediocre Man), in 1913. Ingenieros founded the Buenos Aires Institute of Criminology in 1907 and the Argentine Psychological Society in 1908; he was elected President of the Argentine Medical Association in 1909. During his studies he became a member of the Socialist Party of Argentina.

Ingenieros married Eva Rutenberg, in Lausanne, in 1914. Appointed Assistant Dean of the School of Philosophy and Letters of his alma mater, he played a prominent role in the landmark University reform in Argentina, in 1918. He resigned his academic posts in 1919 to join Claridad, a communist organization, and in 1922, formed Unión Latinoamerica, a political action committee focused on anti-imperialism. He was an active Freemason since 1898. He founded a monthly, Renovación, in 1925, but died in Buenos Aires later that year.

== Sources ==
- Encyclopedia Americana (United States: Encyclopedia Americana Corporation, 1969 edition), pg 172
