= Patria Grande Front =

Argentine political front

Patria Grande Front Frente Patria Grande
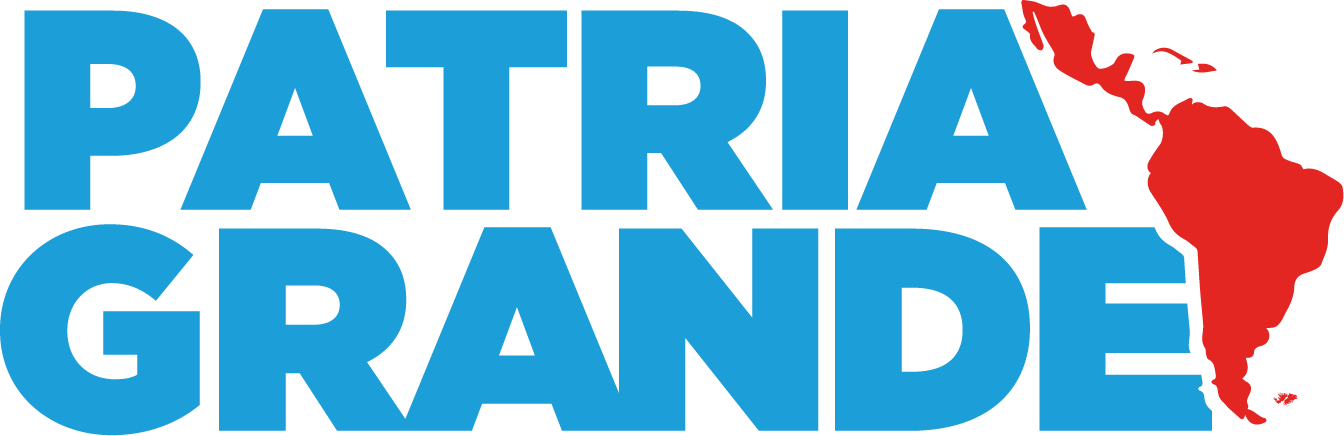
- Leader: Juan Grabois
- Founded: 27 October 2018
- Ideology: Peronism; Anti-neoliberalism; Socialist feminism Socialism of the 21st century Latin American integration Catholic social teaching
- Political position: Left-wing
- National affiliation: Homeland Force
- International affiliation: International Peoples' Assembly; Sovintern
- Colors: Sky blue, red
- Seats in the Chamber of Deputies: 3 / 257
- Seats in the Senate: 0 / 72
- Province Governors: 0 / 24

Website
- patriagrande.org.ar

The Patria Grande Front (Spanish: Frente Patria Grande) is a leftist political front in Argentina founded by activist and social leader Juan Grabois. It was founded in October 2018, ahead of the 2019 Argentine general election, in support of the candidacy of Cristina Fernández de Kirchner and in opposition to the government of Mauricio Macri. As of October 2020, it did not have official party status nationwide.

From 2019 to 2023, it was part of the Frente de Todos, a Peronist coalition formed to support the candidacy of Alberto Fernández (in whose ticket Fernández de Kirchner stood as candidate for vice-president). Following the Frente de Todos's victory, the Patria Grande Front became represented in the national cabinet with the appointment of Elizabeth Gómez Alcorta as Minister of Women, Genders and Diversity. In 2023, it became part of the Unión por la Patria coalition, the successor to Frente de Todos, formed to support Sergio Massa's presidential candidacy.

Patria Grande has minor representation in the lower chamber of the National Congress, with only three national deputies: Itai Hagman, Federico Fagioli, and Natalia Zaracho. The name of the front derives from the concept of Patria Grande.

== Background ==
The Patria Grande Front was founded on 27 October 2018 at a rally held in Mar del Plata, headed by activist and social leader Juan Grabois. The front is a confluence of several social and political organizations, including Vamos, Movimiento Popular La Dignidad, Tres Banderas, and Nueva Mayoría. According to Grabois, the front stands for the "critical reivindication of the popular cycle in Latin America and Argentina".

The front was formed with the intention of backing the candidacy of former president Cristina Fernández de Kirchner ahead of the 2019 general election. In July 2019, when Fernández de Kirchner declined running for president and instead endorsed Alberto Fernández while remaining in his ticket as candidate for vice-president, Patria Grande joined the newly formed Frente de Todos and supported Alberto Fernández's candidacy.

== Ideology and principles ==
The majority of the leaders are young, feminist and have a leftist background.

They were never part of the traditional political parties, and developed a grassroots militancy in public education, the university, shantytowns and some unions.

== Electoral performance ==
=== President ===
Election	Candidate	Coalition	First round		Second round		Result
Election	Candidate	Coalition	Votes	%	Votes	%	Result
2019	Alberto Fernández	Frente de Todos	12,473,709	48.10 (#1)	—N/a		Won
2023 PASO	Juan Grabois	Union for the Homeland	1,441,504	5.85 (#5)	—N/a		Lost
2023	Sergio Massa	Union for the Homeland	9,853,492	36.78 (#1)	11,516,142	44.31 (#2)	Lost

=== Congress ===
Election year	Votes	%	seats won	total seats	position	presidency
2019	11,359,508	45.50 (#1st)	1	1 / 257	Minority	Alberto Fernández (PJ—FDT)
