= Ada María Elflein =

Argentine writer, teacher, and journalist

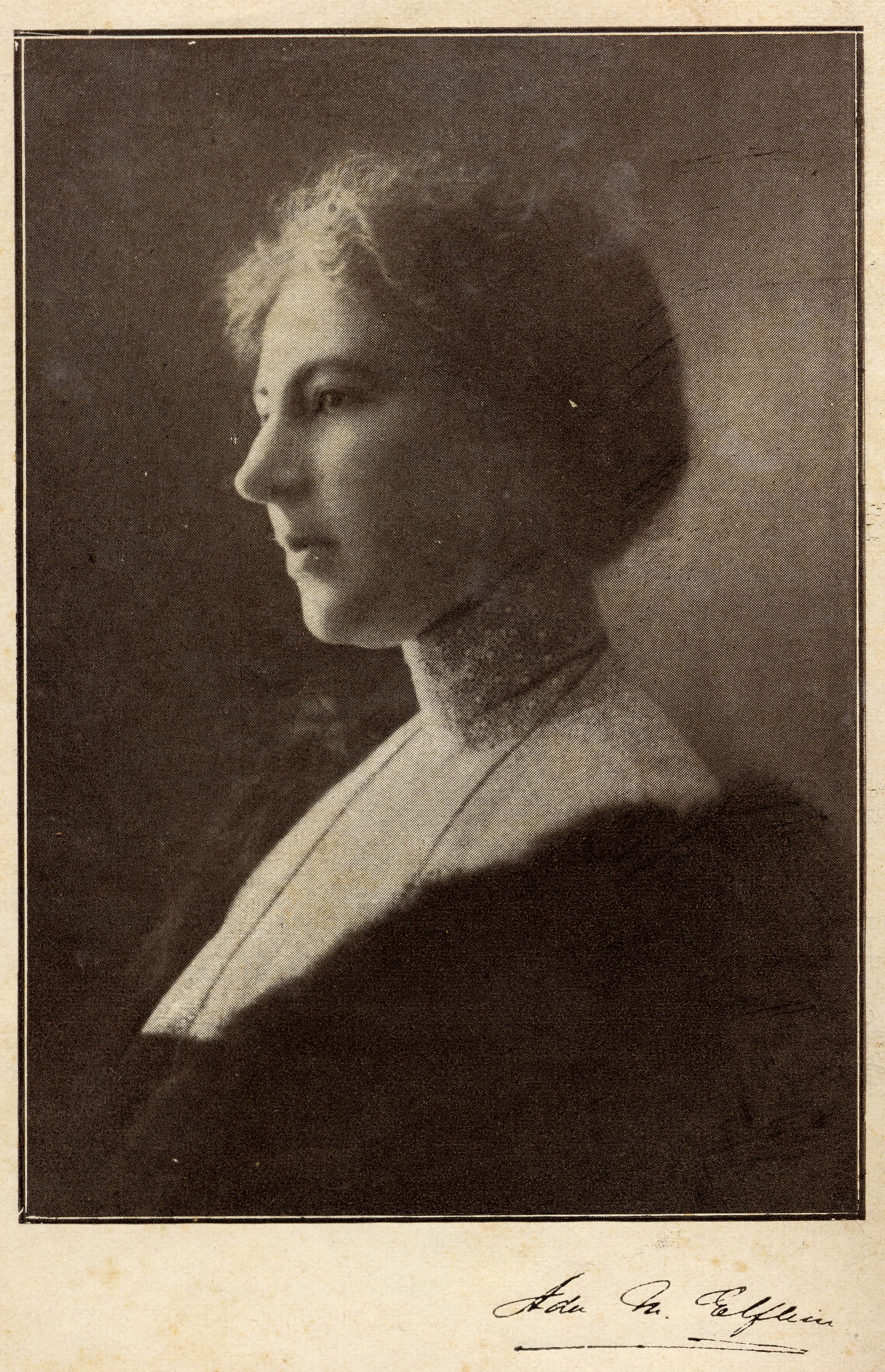
- Born: February 22, 1880; Buenos Aires, Argentina
- Died: July 24, 1919 (aged 39); Buenos Aires, Argentina
- Education: Colegio Nacional de Buenos Aires
- Occupations: Writer, teacher, journalist

Ada María Elflein (February 22, 1880 – July 24, 1919) was an Argentine poet, columnist, translator, feminist and teacher. She was born and died in Buenos Aires.

Her first works were mainly children's literature. Based on her work as a journalist, she was appointed a member of Journalism National Academy. Some schools, libraries and streets have her name.

== Works ==
- Leyendas argentinas, 1906.
- Del Pasado, 1910.
- Cuentos de la Argentina, 1911. Geshichten aus Argentinien, published in German, her native language.
- Tierra Santa, 1912.
- Paisajes cordilleranos, 1917.
- La Partida, 1918.
- Por Campos históricos, 1926. Posthumous
- De Tierra adentro, 1961. Posthumous
