= Instituto Libre de Segunda Enseñanza =

Coordinates: 34°36′6.9″S 58°23′1.4″W

- ILSE
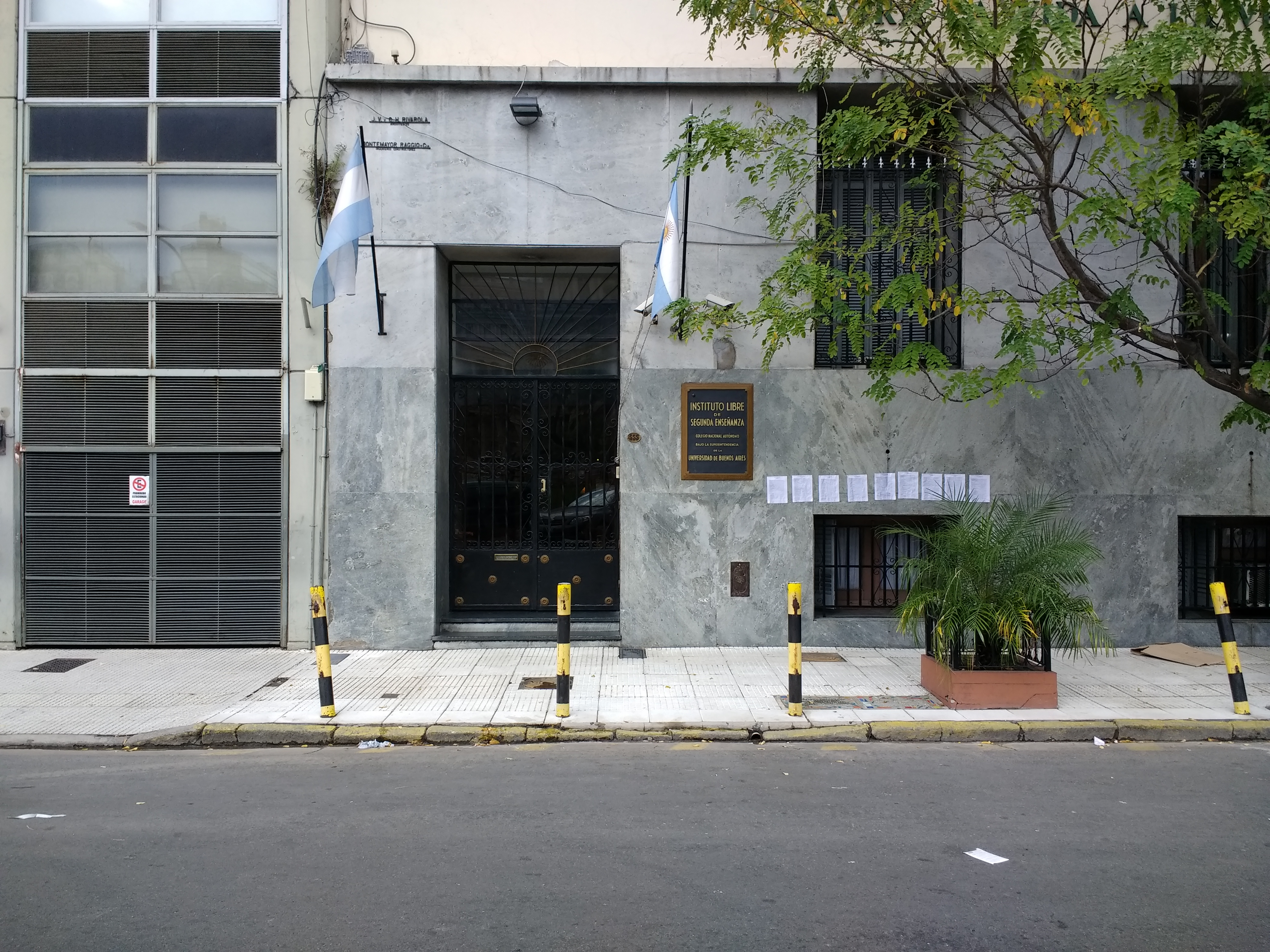
- The Instituto Libre de Segunda Enseñanza in 2017

Location
- Libertad 555; Buenos Aires; Argentina

Information
- Type: Semi-private
- Motto: "Vitam Impendere Vero" (Devote life to the truth)
- Established: 1892
- Rector: Roald César Devetac
- Grades: 1st - 5th year
- Gender: Coeducational
- Colours: French blue and white
- Affiliation: Universidad de Buenos Aires
- Website: http://www.ilse.esc.edu.ar/

The Instituto Libre de Segunda Enseñanza, also known for its acronym ILSE, is a semi-private high school depending on the University of Buenos Aires (UBA).

With an approximate 1000 students population, it is located in the San Nicolás neighbourhood in Buenos Aires, Argentina.

As part of its affiliation with the UBA, its students are required to meet certain academic standards to join the school. Students willing to enroll have to undergo an admission process and pass for their application to be approved.

This process consists of a one-year course, involving multiple exams on Mathematics, History, Language and Geography.

Almost all of its faculty is composed by UBA professors, and sports related activities are carried out at University of Buenos Aires campuses and facilities.

The school has gained a reputation for its rigorous admission and academic criteria, refusing to admit students who have been held back, or have more than one subject that has not been passed. The school has been repeatedly recognized for its academic excellence.

== History ==
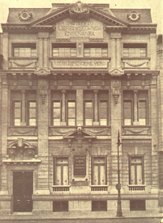
The Instituto Libre de Segunda Enseñanza in 1892.

The Instituto libre de Segunda Enseñanza was founded in 1892 by a group of men with experience in education who, before, during and after their activities in the school, occupied important scientific, political and social positions.

Almost all of the men who composed the teaching staff of the institute came from the historical Colegio Nacional de Buenos Aires school, to which they resigned collectively as a reaction to the dismissal of the director by part of the government.

In a visit carried out by the Chief Inspector of the Ministry of Education to the Nacional de Buenos Aires school, a small group of students displayed attitudes that he considered irreverent. Angered, he compiled a report that requested, among other things, the release of the young Director, Adolfo Orma. Twenty-four hours later, the Executive authority decreed the dismissal of Dr. Orma, and temporarily naming the Inspector. The public protested at the execution of these events, and the papers censored the issue. The students revolted in parts of the city, and the teaching staff, was unanimous convened in the house of the professor Calixto Oyuela, and sent their collective resignation to the Chief inspector.

Calixto Oyuela then proposed to create a new school, one "free of official influences, judgements, and national politic changes", and it was funded on 16 May 1892, under the name "Instituto Libre de Segunda Enseñanza", on Florida 756, with Adolfo Orma as its director. The school was put under the academic protection of the Universidad de Buenos Aires, and received the political support and educational help of Bartolomé Mitre and Vicente Fidel López. Later, the school moved its facilities to Libertad 555

== Facilities ==
The school's building comprises five laboratories (Chemistry, Biology, Physics and Computer Science), altoghether with an arts workshop and Adolfo Bioy Caseres Library, available for students on the last floor as a study area.

== Notable alumni ==
Some remarkable ILSE Alumni include:

- Carlos Saavedra Lamas - 1936 Nobel Peace Prize winner, first South American Nobel Peace Prize recipient.
- Adolfo Bioy Casares- Argentine writer and author
- Amancio Williams - Argentine modernist architect
- Roberto Marcelino Ortiz - President of Argentina (1938–1940)
- Juan Grabois - Argentine former presidential candidate and member of parliament (attended, did not graduate)
- Aníbal Ibarra - Mayor of Buenos Aires (2000–2006)
- Enrique Telémaco Susini - Argentine radio pioneer
- Ricardo Mario "Chino" Darín - Argentinian actor
- Oliverio Girondo - Argentine surrealist poet
- Ricardo Güiraldes - Argentine traditionalist writer
- Fernando Sendra - Argentine comic book writer and illustrator
