= Franja Morada =

Argentine university political group

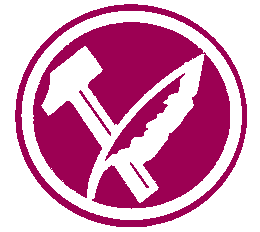
- Chairperson: Antonella Bormapé
- Founded: 1967
- Headquarters: Buenos Aires
- Ideology: Progressivism; Reformism
- Colours: Purple
- Mother party: Radical Civic Union
- International affiliation: International Union of Socialist Youth
- Website: www.franjamorada.org.ar

Franja Morada ("Purple Strip") is the student wing of the Radical Civic Union (UCR), a major political party in Argentina. Founded in 1967, it has led the Argentine University Federation (FUA) since the end of the military dictatorship in 1983.

The organization takes its name from the 1918 University Reform. During the storming of the National University of Córdoba, student protestors ripped off the curtains of the Aula Magna and waved them as flags – the curtains were purple, the same color as the stoles of the Catholic clerics who ran the university. Purple thus became the identifying color of supporters of the reform, which sought to democratize universities and end the Church's involvement in public higher education.

Franja Morada's "mesa nacional" has a secretary general and three adjunct secretaries. Elections to national authorities take place every two years. Since 2022, the secretary general has been Antonella Bormapé, of the National University of La Plata. Despite being affiliated to the UCR, it is institutionally autonomous.

Franja Morada currently holds the presidency of the Argentine University Federation (FUA), the most important student organization in Argentina, as well as the presidency of several local University Federations throughout the country.

Internationally, Franja Morada is affiliated to the International Union of Socialist Youth (IUSY).
