= Argentine university reform of 1918 =

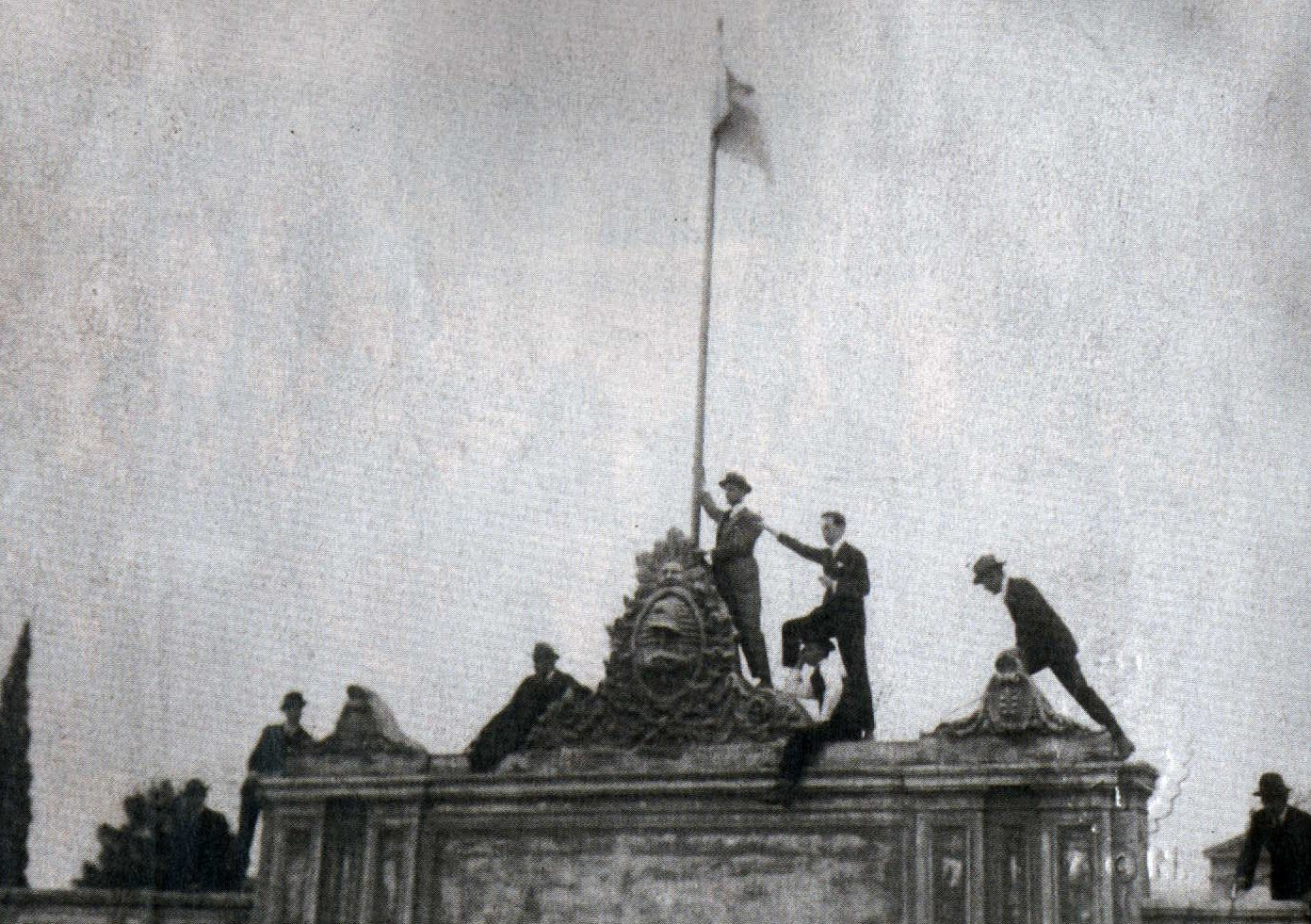
Students raise the flag of Argentina at the University of Córdoba.

The Argentine university reform of 1918 was a general modernization of the universities, especially tending towards democratization, brought about by student activism during the presidency of Hipólito Yrigoyen. The events started in Córdoba and spread to the rest of Argentina, and then through much of Latin America. The reform set up the freedom for universities to define their own curriculum and manage their own budget without interference from the central government. This has had a profound effect on academic life at the universities through the nationalization process that boasts academic freedom and independence throughout the university life.

== Background ==
Ever since the Jesuits founded the first university in Argentina in the 17th century, education was managed by the clergy and conservative upper-class citizens. The universities' authorities were selected by them, and professors were appointed for life. Professors also decided on the subjects to be taught, usually following the preferences of the Church and suppressed modern ideas such as Darwin's theory of evolution

By the end of the 19th century many changes were taking place in Argentina. With the arrival of European immigrants in large waves, new ideas arrived with them which were opposed to the old oligarchic conservatism. The 1912 Sáenz Peña Law of the secret vote brought the less conservative Hipólito Yrigoyen to the presidency in 1916.

It was in 1918 that the students of the National University of Córdoba, probably the most conservative in Argentina at that time, demanded a revision of the university's statutes to modernize and democratize them. They succeeded in creating student centres, but their demands were ignored.

== Demands ==
The demands of the students can be summarized in four main topics:

- University autonomy: the right for the university to choose its own government, professors and studies without the intervention of the government or any other organism.
- Co-government: the equality of all parties in the university (students, professors and graduated students) to participate in the election of the above.
- Scientific modernization: a review of the contents of curricula, to include modern scientific knowledge to the study material.
- No tuition: the right for every student to acquire university education.
- Secular education: education programs and syllabuses free of Catholic dogmatism.

== Features ==
The most important features of the Reform described in the Liminar Manifesto can be summarized as follows:

a) Institutionalization of student participation in university councils, joining professors and alumni in a three-party system known as co-governance.
b) A linkage between student politics and national politics in order to mobilize the university toward the solution of economic, social and political problems.
c) An emphasis on university extension, particularly courses for workers that would lead to the development of fraternal bonds with the proletariat.
d) Tuition-free education and open admission to all academically qualified applicants, in order to replace the elitist and archaic 19th century university with a democratic, modern and mass university.
e) A defense of institutional autonomy with respect to the state.
f) Institutionalization of mechanisms to protect academic freedom, including the implementation of "free teaching" (docencia libre) to ensure academic pluralism and to break the monopoly of teaching enjoyed by senior professors (catedráticos).
g) Promotion of new ideas, innovative methods of teaching, changes in exam systems, optional classroom attendance, original research, and a rejection of dogmatism, all leading to the replacement of theology by positivist disciplines.
h) Selection of faculty through open, competitive examinations in order to counteract nepotism and patronage, and promotion of professors on the basis of merit and achievement rather than seniority.
i) The enlargement and diversification of professional training through the establishment of new professional schools.
j) An understanding of university life as a truly communitarian experience, therefore encouraging the development of a population of full-time professors and full time students.

== Conflict ==
The University Reform Movement (UFM) in Argentina, or Movimiento de la Reforma Universitaria "emerged as a revolution ‘from below’ and ‘from inside’ against what was considered as a very old type of university". The conflict started with a lateral problem, the cancellation of the patients beds at the Hospital de Clínicas university hospital in late 1917.

On March 31, 1918, when classes should have been restarted, the students organised another strike, with demonstrations, that finally forced the national government to intervene the university.

José Matienzo was named intervenor of the university, and he confirmed most of the irregularities described by the students. He declared vacant the positions of Rector of the university and Deans of the faculties, and commanded the democratisation of the university's statutes. But the students were not to be part of this process, since the conservative Antonio Nores was voted Rector of the University, against the wishes of the students.

The students occupied the faculties' premises, so classes could not be restarted regularly. They resisted the police and were finally driven out by force by the national army. This produced a general uneasiness of the public throughout the country, which forced President Yrigoyen to appoint his Minister of Justice and Public Education, José S. Salinas, as a new intervenor of the university. The decree of the university reform was redacted on October 12, 1918.

== Repercussions ==
The objectives of the 1918 Cordoba Reform were promptly adopted by many student organizations, and one by one, from Argentina to Mexico, Latin American universities experienced unprecedented uprisings. The same year the reform statutes were enacted into law at Córdoba, they were extended to the University of Buenos Aires and later to other Argentinean universities. Its principles were included in the 1920 manifesto of the Argentine University Federation, and subsequently endorsed by the International Student Congress on University Reform held in Mexico City in 1921, with the participation of delegates from Latin America, United States, Europe, and Asia. In 1924, when Haya de la Torre, leader of the university reform in Peru, founded the Popular Revolutionary American Alliance, the original student demands evolved into a vigorous and ambitious political, social, and economic movement. The Cordoba Reform had a tremendous impact in most Latin American universities, and would even inspire the leaders of the 1960s student movement in industrialized countries.

The success of the students' demands in Córdoba soon spread to other important universities such as the University of Buenos Aires, the National University of La Plata, the National University of Tucumán and the National University of the Littoral, from which it extended to other Latin American countries: first to Peru, then Chile and Cuba, Colombia, Guatemala and Uruguay. In the 1930s, a second Latin American wave of university reforms shook Brazil, Paraguay, Bolivia, Ecuador, Venezuela and Mexico. The repercussion went further even eliciting the autonomy of the Royal and Pontifical University of Mexico granted in the 1920s into the National Autonomous University of Mexico that exist up to day. Likewise México, but in 1921, the Peruvian Royal and Pontifical University of San Marcos granted the autonomy of the nowadays National University of San Marcos the oldest university in the Americas.

Since University Reform, student organisations have maintained close links with workers' organizations and labor unions, frequently joining them in demonstrations and protests. Another consequence has been the politicizing of the student centers for the elections inside the universities, with which they are usually connected, identified with, and supported by national political parties.

== See also ==
- Argentine University Federation
- Chilean university reform
- National Universities
- Science and technology in Argentina
- Ariel (essay)
