= Alberto Gorbatt =

Argentine architect

Alberto Gorbatt (born 1953 in Buenos Aires) is an architect at the Faculty of Architecture, Design and Urban Planning at the University of Buenos Aires.

== Biography ==
In 1996, Gorbatt founded ARQA, the first Open Community of Architecture, Design and Construction in Latin America.

== Editorial, curatorial and institutional experience ==
- Director of ARQA in Argentina, Bolivia, Ecuador, México, Paraguay, Peru and Uruguay
- Director of ARQADIA AMERICA, a program for the selection and promotion of new generations of architects and designers in the Americas (a program of the Pan-American Federation of Architecture Associations (FPAA))
- Director General of the Argentina International Biennial of Architecture (BIA-AR)
- Director General of the Uruguay International Biennial of Architecture (BIA-UY)
- Editor of SCALAE, and Argentine architectural journal
- Director of the ARQA Encuentros de Arquitectura [Architecture Conferences]
- Member of the Oversight Commission of the Argentine Central Society of Architects (SCA)
