= Eva Perón Foundation =

Former Argentine foundation

- Fundación Eva Perón
- Founded: 8 July 1948
- Founder: Eva Perón
- Dissolved: 23 September 1955

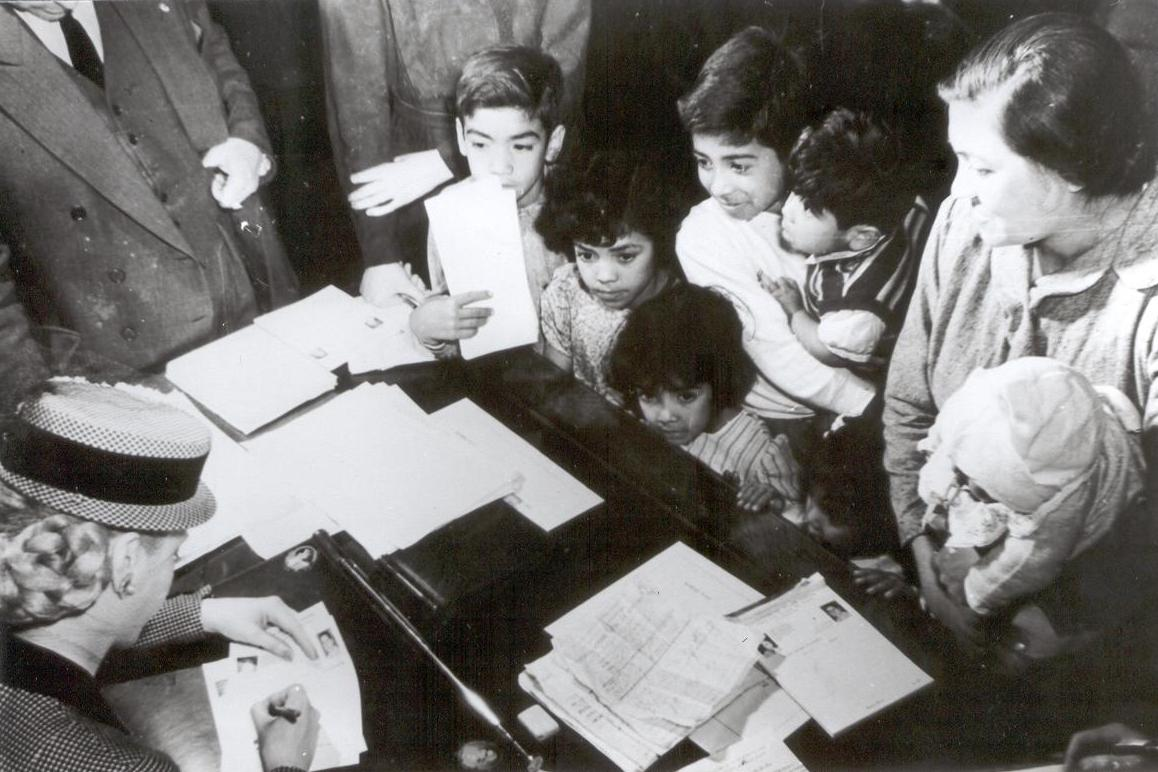
Evita working in the foundation

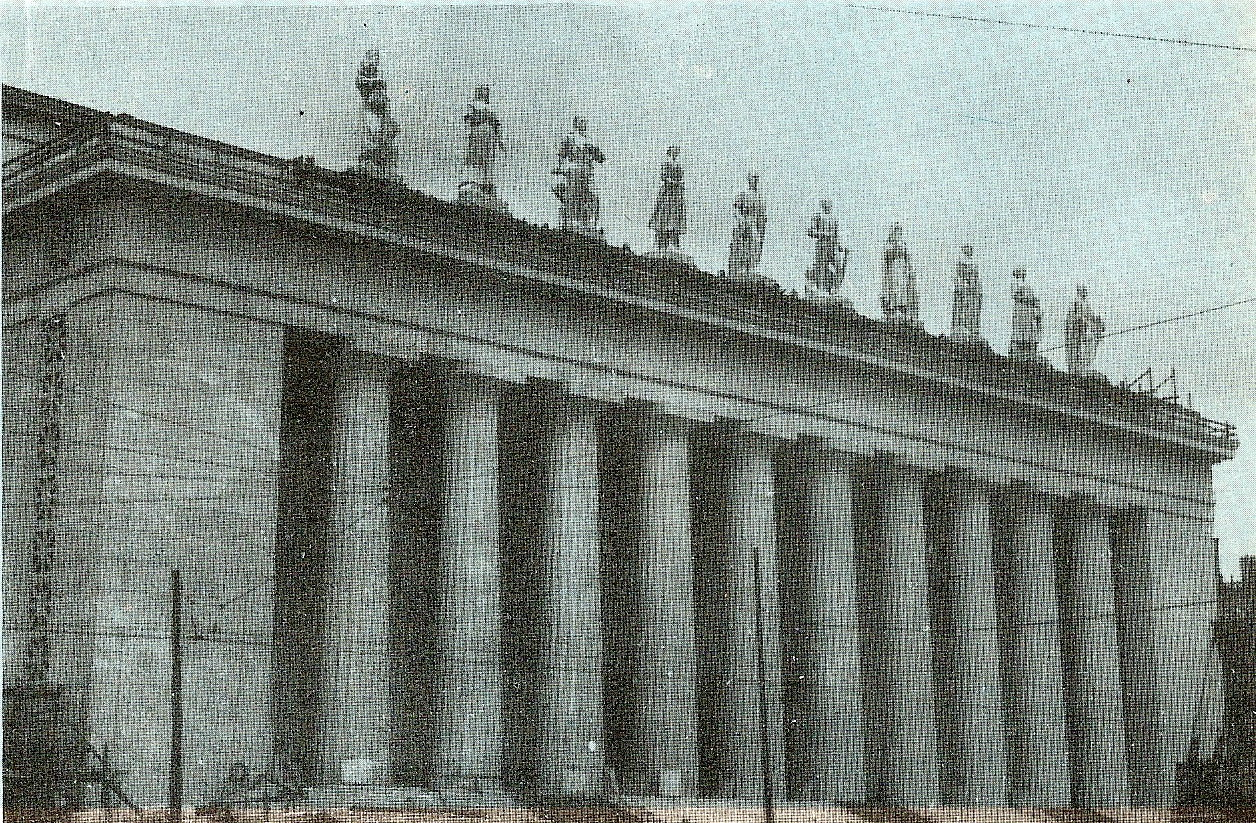
Headquarters of the Eva Perón Foundation in 1950, which today is the Faculty of Engineering of the University of Buenos Aires

The Eva Perón Foundation (Spanish: Fundación Eva Perón) was a charitable foundation begun by Eva Perón, a prominent Argentine political leader activist and actress, when she was the First Lady and Spiritual Leader of the Nation of Argentina. It operated from 1948 until it was forcibly dissolved by the military after the 1955 coup d'état.

== Inspiration and beginnings ==
Social welfare in Argentina was highly underdeveloped before Juan Perón was elected President in 1946 and his wife, who had been born into the working classes, was aware of this. Most charity work was undertaken by the Sociedad de Beneficencia, which was controlled by eighty-seven elderly women of the upper classes. The orphans whose care the Sociedad controlled had to wear blue smocks and have their heads shaved; at Christmas they were put out onto the streets of Buenos Aires with collecting tins. Their policies are supposed to have been the inspiration behind Evita's famous declaration that, 'When the rich think about the poor, they have poor ideas.'

The chairpersons of this society were traditionally the Papal Nuncio to Argentina and the First Lady, but the society refused to extend the invitation to Evita when her husband was elected president. At first they insisted that it was because she was too young; but it was widely interpreted as an insult to the new First Lady. Evita was furious and moved against the society, effectively bringing it to an end in 1947. She then created her own foundation to replace it. ‘It is time,’ Evita declared, ‘for [real] social justice.’

== Beginnings ==
On 8 July 1948 the María Eva Duarte de Perón Foundation was established. Its name was later changed to the simpler Eva Perón Foundation. Its opening charter declared that it was to remain ‘in the sole hands of its founder… who will… possess the widest powers afforded by the State and the Constitution.’ The Foundation's aims were to provide monetary assistance and scholarships to gifted children from impoverished backgrounds, build homes, schools, hospitals and orphanages in underprivileged areas and ‘to contribute or collaborate by any possible means to the creation of works tending to satisfy the basic needs for better life of the less privileged classes.’ Initially work began with nothing more than garden parties for single mothers or Evita's personal trips to the ghettoes of Buenos Aires to hand out aid parcels.

== At its height ==
By the end of the 1940s, Evita and her team of advisers had worked so effectively that the Foundation was better-funded and organised than many departments of State. It had funds of over three billion pesos, $200 million on the controlled exchange rate, employed over 14,000 workers, purchased 500,000 sewing machines, 400,000 pairs of shoes and 200,000 cooking pots for distribution annually and it had succeeded in building numerous new houses, schools, hospitals and orphanages.

The vast majority of these funds came from willing donors and the Peronist-dominated Congress, who were keen to back the First Lady's endeavours. The trade unions, who saw Evita as their patron, regularly sent enormous contributions to the Foundation's work. More importantly, the Catholic Church had endorsed her projects, citing Biblical exhortations towards charity for the poor and Evita's own personal priest, Father Benítez, claimed that the need to help the poor had taken over Eva Perón's life. Finally, Congress assisted in 1950 by ruling that a proportion of all lottery tickets, cinema tickets and gambling games played in casinos should be given to the Foundation. By the time of Evita's death in 1952, the popularity of the Foundation amongst her millions of followers had given her an aura of sainthood.

== Criticisms ==
There are rumors that Evita and her intimates were enriching themselves through the charity but this "charge has never been proven.”

== Decline ==
After Evita's premature death in 1952, the Foundation briefly passed under the control of other Peronist women; but it did not outlast the fall of the regime itself in 1955 and had been in terminal decline since 1952 anyway. It was disbanded like every other Perónist organization by the military junta in 1955, after they overthrew Juan Perón on September 19, 1955. Its headquarters was located on Avenida Paseo Colón 850, which was granted to the Faculty of Engineering, University of Buenos Aires in 1956. The ten six-meter high statues on the roof of the headquarters, representing the descamisados, were designed and sculpted from Carrara marble by the Italian sculptor Leone Tommasi and installed in 1950. In 1955, after the coup d'état, the statues were removed and thrown into the Matanza River, from where, in 1996, by order of President Carlos Menem, only three were found and were retrieved. The three statues can currently be seen in San Vicente where Juan Perón is buried.
