= Parque de la Memoria =

Memorial park to the 1970s Dirty War victims in Argentina

Coordinates: 34°32′28″S 58°26′13″W

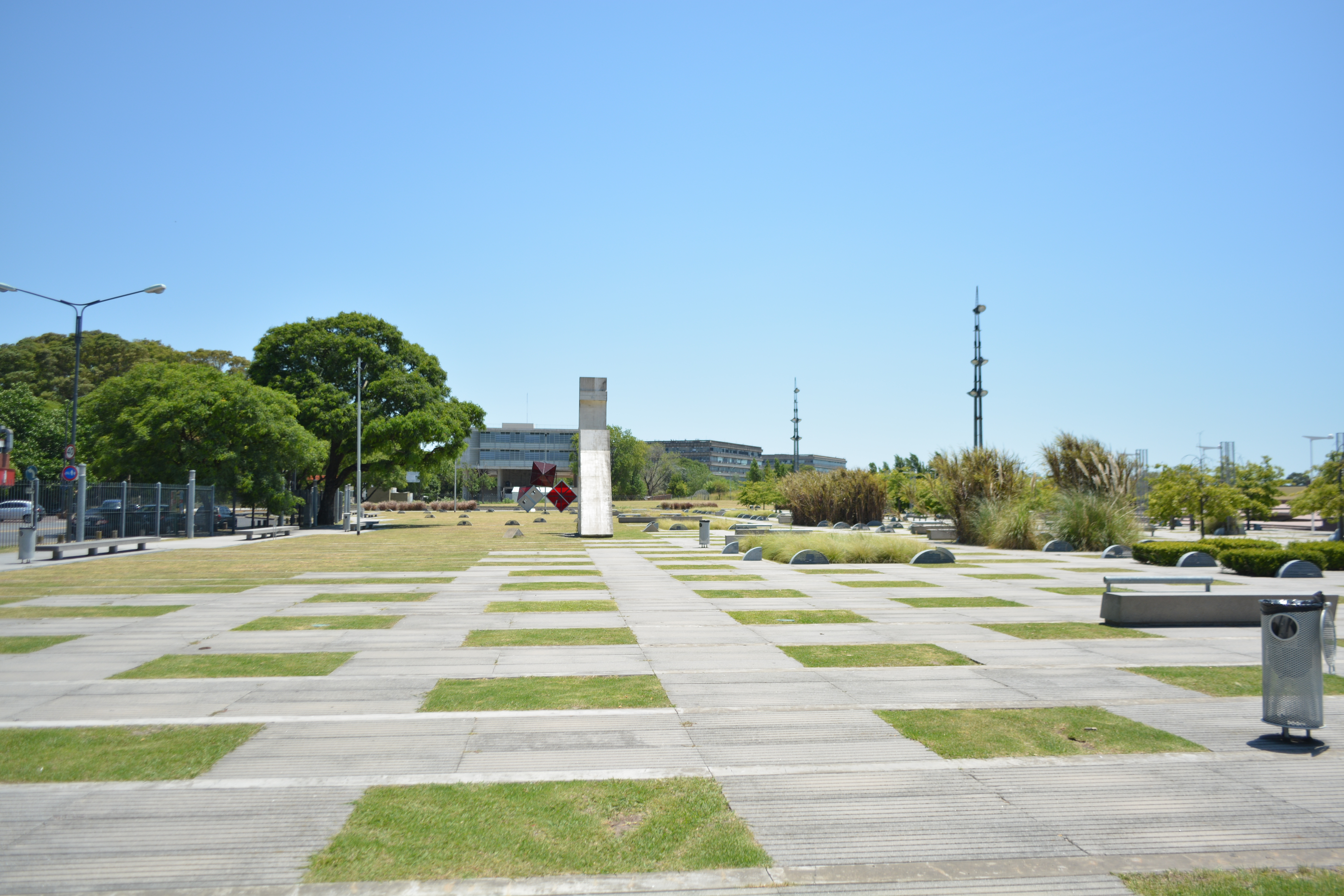
Parque de la Memoria

The Parque de la Memoria (English: Remembrance Park) is a public space situated in front of the Río de la Plata estuary in the northern end of the Belgrano section of Buenos Aires. It is a memorial to the victims of the 1976–1983 military regime, known as the National Reorganization Process, during the Dirty War, a period of unprecedented state-sponsored violence in Argentina.

== Origin and Location ==
In 1997, students from the National School of Buenos Aires proposed the creation of a public park along the Río de la Plata to memorialize the 30,000 Argentines disappeared by the government. Memory park is located along the Río de la Plata, on Buenos Aires' North Costanera Avenue, near the Ciudad Universitaria.

The site is significant as the resting place of many of the victims. About 300 metres (980 ft) north of the park is a military airport that was utilized for the "flights of death" during which victims of the Military Junta government were thrown into the river and sea.

The government of Buenos Aires approved the park's construction on July 21, 1998.

== Characteristics ==
The park covers about 14 hectares (35 acres). In October 2006 a ramped path was installed as well as commemorative sculptures, dedicated to the victims of the government sponsored violence. The ramped path is meant to form a giant "wound" in the lawn of the park leading toward the river, where the name of those killed or vanished are located. The park contains 18 sculptures, 12 of which were chosen through a competition, the other six were by artists with a commitment to human rights. Sculptures by Roberto Aizenberg, William G. Tucker, and Dennis Oppenheim were installed and dedicated at the park during October 2006. There is also a public meeting hall in the park used for purposes related to the arts, science and the memory of the victims of the reorganization.

The park contains untitled works by artists Aizenberg, Clorindo Testa, and Jenny Holzer. Some of the other works in the park include: Memoria espacial by Per Kirkeby, La casa de la historia by Marjetica Potrc, Figuras caminando by Magdalena Abakanowicz by Leo Vinci, and Por gracia recibida by Carlos Distéfano.

== Monument to the Victims of State Terror ==
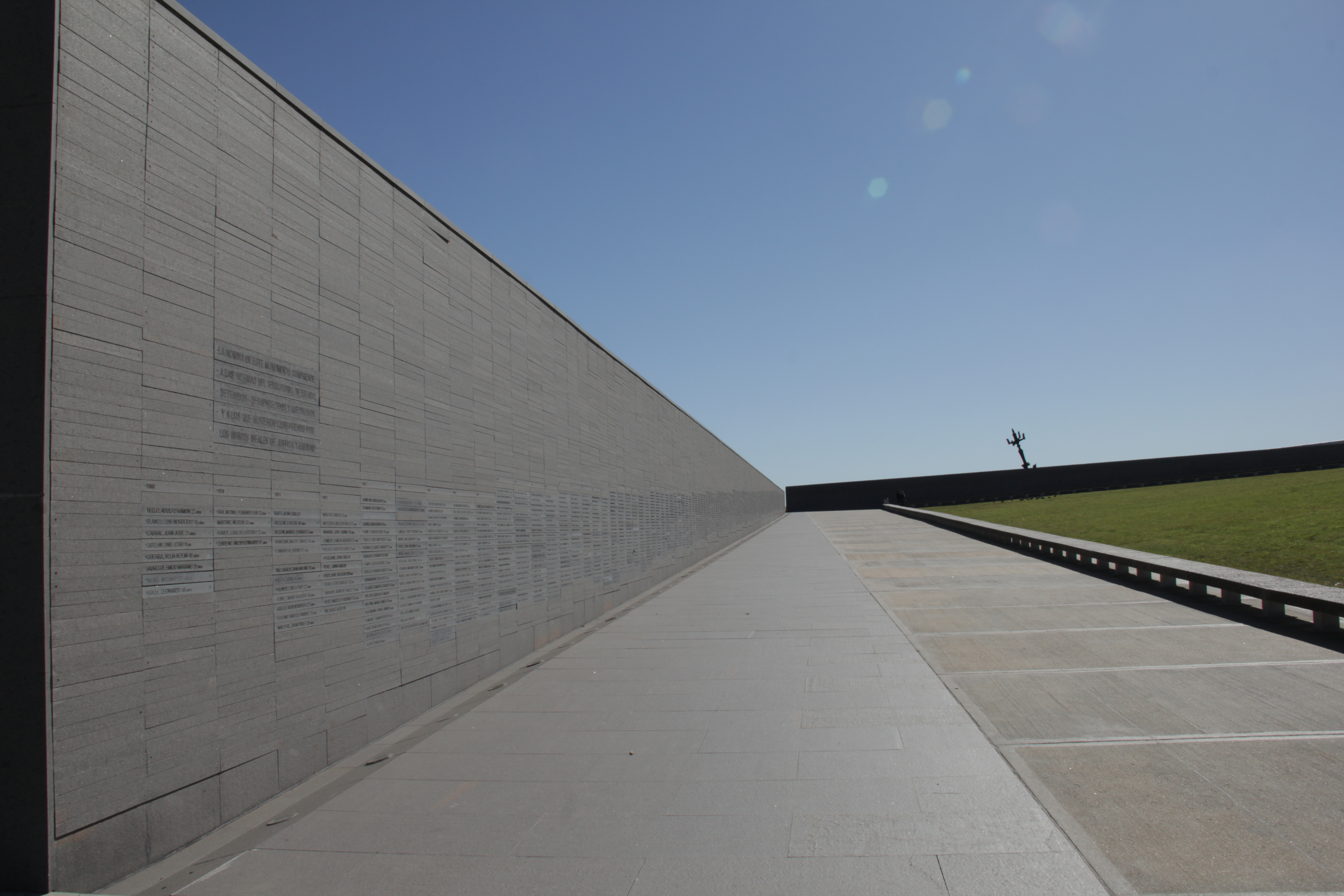
Monument to the Victims of State Terror, Buenos Aires.

Argentine architect Alberto Varas won the 1998 international competition for a monument incorporating the names of the victims of Argentine state-sponsored violence. Varas' "Monument to the Victims of State Terror" (Monumento a las Victimas del Terrorismo de Estado) is constructed of grey concrete with the names of the disappeared listed on name plates made of Patagonian porphyry stone. The names are listed chronologically and alphabetically, and additionally note when the victim was pregnant.

== Additional Information ==
- Parque de la Memoria, Commission on Monuments to the Victims of State Sponsored Terrorism, official site, Spanish. Retrieved 29 October 2007.
