= Faculty of Engineering, University of Buenos Aires =

Faculty of Engineering
- Facultad de Ingeniería
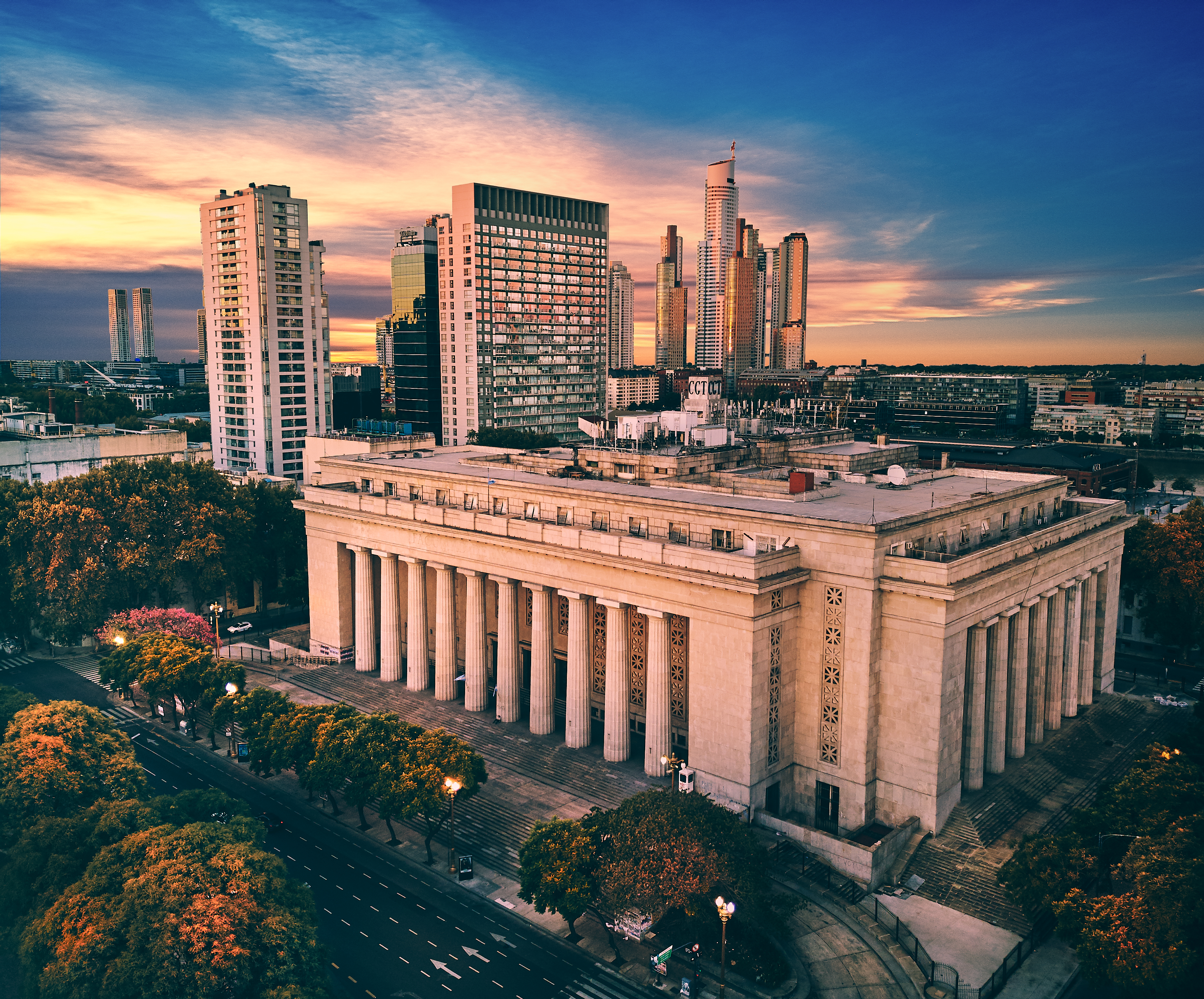
- Paseo Colón branch, San Telmo
- Type: Faculty
- Established: 1952; 74 years ago
- Affiliation: University of Buenos Aires
- Dean: Alejandro M. Martínez
- Students: 8,698 (2011)
- Address: Av. Paseo Colón 850, Buenos Aires, Argentina; 34.3704°S 58.2205°W
- Website: fi.uba.ar

The Faculty of Engineering (Facultad de Ingeniería; FIUBA) is a faculty of the University of Buenos Aires (UBA), the largest university in Argentina. It offers graduate courses on various fields of engineering, including civil engineering, computer science and engineering, mechanical engineering, electronic engineering, naval engineering, among others. It also offers graduate courses on system analysis, as well as post-graduate degrees on the magister, doctoral and post-doctoral levels.

It was founded in 1952, as a split from the Faculty of Exact and Natural Sciences. As of 2011, it counted with 8,698 graduate students, making it the eighth-largest constituent faculty at the university.

The faculty has its main seat on Av. Paseo Colón 850, in a Neoclassical building in the Buenos Aires neighborhood of San Telmo. It also has an annex building on Av. Las Heras, in Recoleta, and a special annex for the chemical engineering and food engineering departments at Ciudad Universitaria.

== History ==
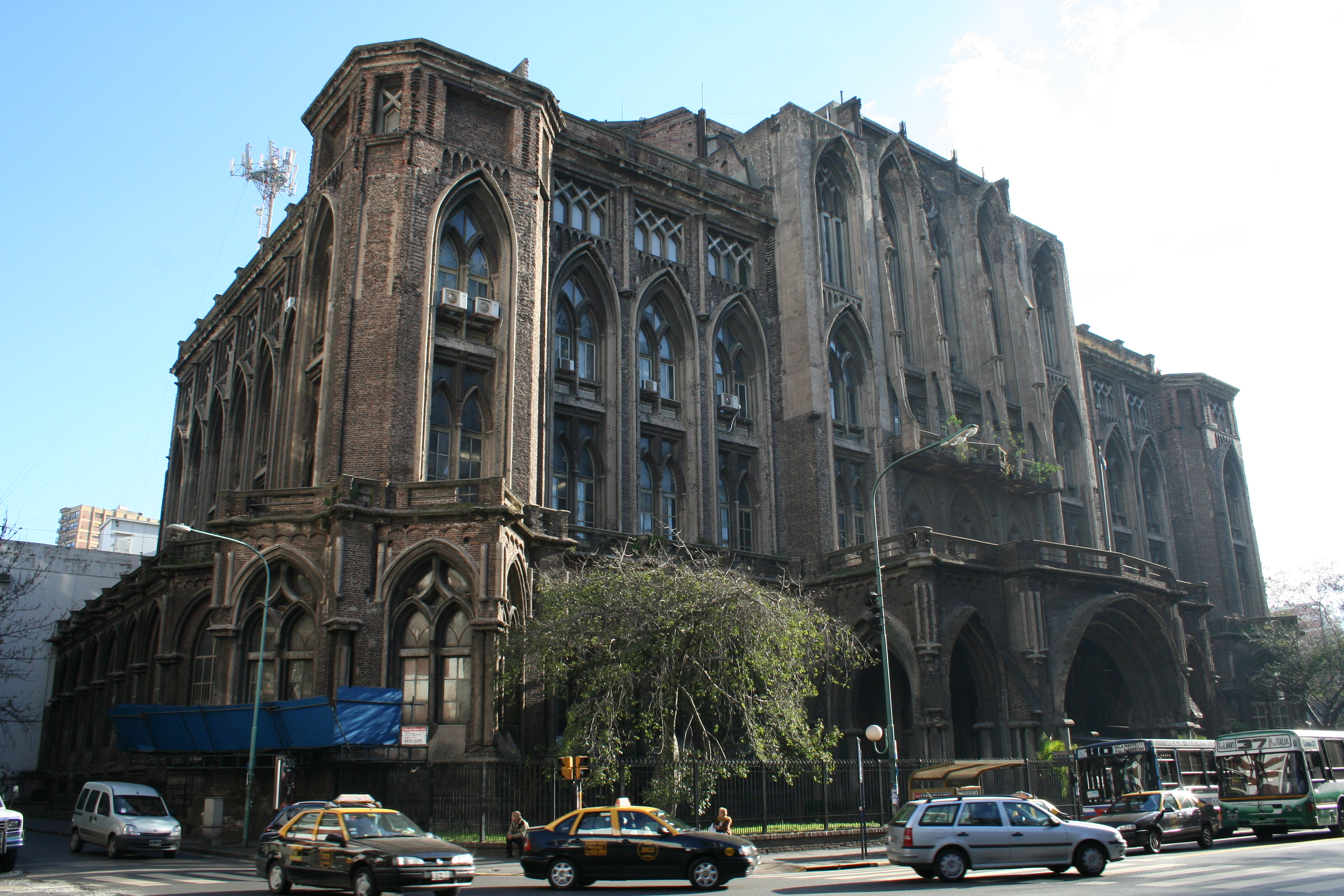
Las Heras seat of the FIUBA, former seat of the Faculty of Law

The University of Buenos Aires began imparting courses on engineering as early as 1865, when Rector Juan María Gutiérrez ordered the re-establishment of the Department of Exact Sciences, which saw courses on "pure and applied mathematics", as well as natural history. By 1866, the department counted with thirteen enrolled students: Valentín Balbín, Santiago Brian, Adolfo Büttner, Jorge Coquet, Luis A. Huergo, Francisco Lavalle, Carlos Olivera, Matías Sánchez, Luis Silveyra, Miguel Sorondo, Zacarías Tapia, Guillermo Villanueva and Guillermo White. The first of them to graduate from the university was Luis Huergo, who graduated as an "Engineer of the School of this University in the Faculty of Exact Sciences". The first woman to graduate with an engineering degree from the university was Elisa Bachofen, who became the first woman to graduate as an engineer in Argentina and in Latin America in 1918.

The first pensum of the degree counted with 18 mandatory subjects, of which 30% were linked to technical drawing and 30% to mathematics. Only two of these subjects were related to construction, while an additional two were on geology and mineralogy. In addition, engineers were expected to be educated in surveying.

In 1874, a decree saw the establishment of five different faculties in the University of Buenos Aires. The Department of Exact Sciences became two separate faculties: the Faculty of Mathematics, and the Faculty of Physical-Natural Sciences. Engineering degrees were imparted by the Faculty of Mathematics. An 1891 degree re-established the Faculty of Exact, Physical and Natural Sciences. In 1894, a group of engineering students founded the first students' union in Argentina, La Línea Recta ("the straight line"). A national decree in 1952 officially established the Faculty of Engineering as an autonomous faculty within the university.

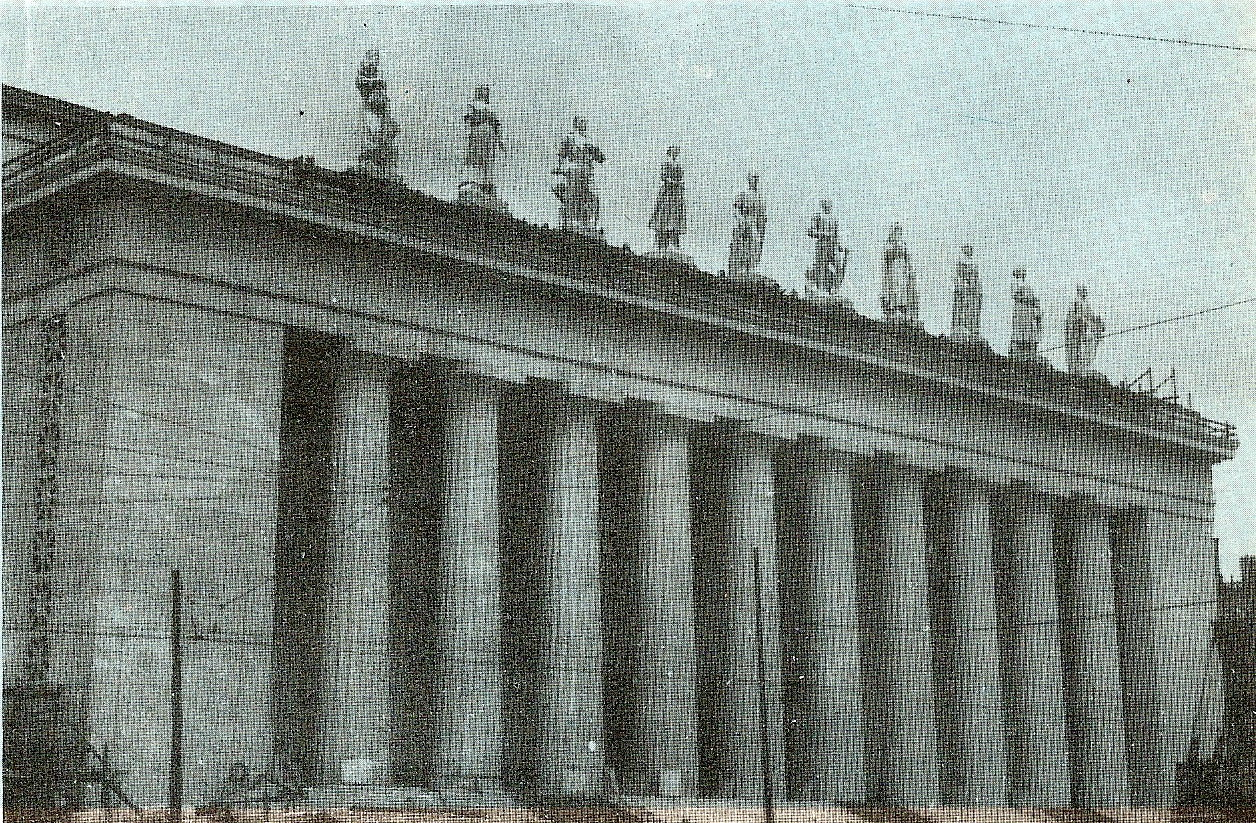
The building of the Faculty of Engineering seen in 1950, when it was the headquarters of the Eva Perón Foundation

The faculty had its seat at the Illuminated Block, on Perú 222, up until it was relocated to a Neo-Gothic building on Las Heras Av. in the Recoleta barrio in 1948. The former headquarters of the Eva Perón Foundation, on Av. Paseo Colón 850, was additionally granted to the faculty in 1956, in the aftermath of the 1955 coup d'état. The ten six-meter high statues on the roof of the headquarters, representing the "descamisados", were designed and sculpted from Carrara marble by the Italian sculptor Leone Tommasi and installed in 1950. In 1955, after the coup d'état, the statues were removed and thrown into the Matanza River, from where, in 1996, by order of President Carlos Menem, only three were found and were retrieved. The three statues can currently be seen in San Vicente where Juan Perón is buried.

== Degrees ==
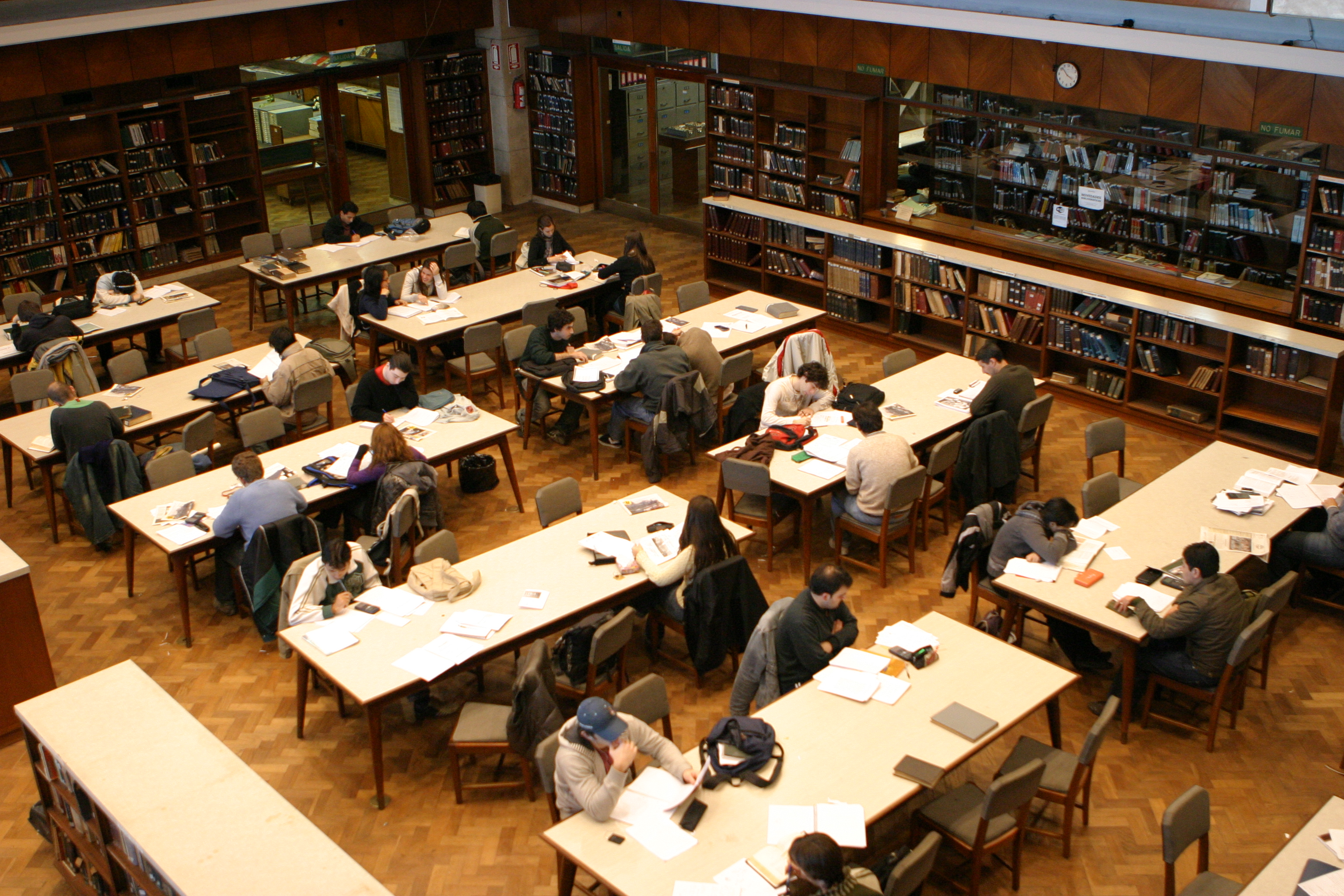
Biblioteca Enrique Butty, Paseo Colón seat

FIUBA offers graduate (licenciatura) degrees on:

- Civil engineering
- Industrial engineering
- Naval engineering and mechanics
- Mechanical engineering
- Electric engineering
- Electronic engineering
- Chemical engineering
- Petroleum engineering
- Surveying engineering
- System analysis
- Computer engineering
- Food engineering

In addition, the faculty offers a number of specialization degrees, as well as magister degrees, doctorates and post-doctoral degrees.

== Political and institutional life ==
Like the rest of the University of Buenos Aires's faculties, the Faculty of Engineering operates under the principle of tripartite co-governance, wherein authorities are democratically elected and professors, students and graduates are represented in the faculty's governing bodies. The faculty is headed by a Dean (Spanish: decana or decano), who presides over the Directive Council (Consejo Directivo). The Directive Council is made up of eight representatives for the professors, four representatives of the student body, and four representatives of the faculty's graduates. Deans are elected by the Directive Council every four years, while elections to the council take place every two years.

Since 2018, the dean of the Faculty of Engineering has been Alejandro M. Martínez.
