= Faculty of Architecture, Design and Urbanism, University of Buenos Aires =

Arts school at the University of Buenos Aires

Faculty of Architecture, Design and Urbanism
- Facultad de Arquitectura, Diseño y Urbanismo
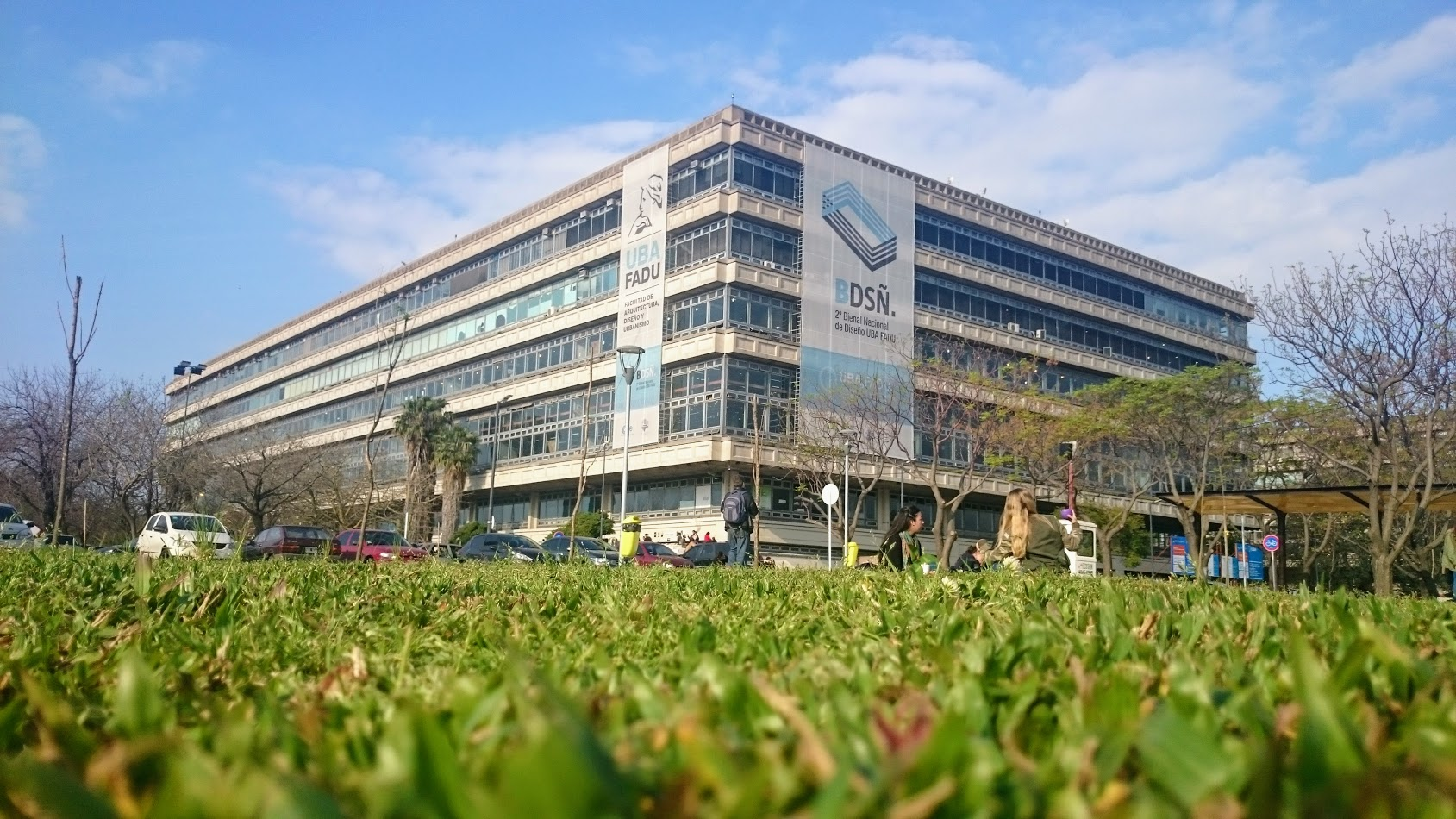
- FADU building in Ciudad Universitaria
- Type: Faculty
- Established: 1901; 125 years ago
- Affiliations: University of Buenos Aires
- Dean: Carlos Venancio
- Students: 25.748
- Location: Buenos Aires, Argentina; 34.3229°S 58.2638°W
- Website: fadu.uba.ar

The Faculty of Architecture, Design and Urbanism (Facultad de Arquitectura, Diseño y Urbanismo; FADU) is a faculty of the University of Buenos Aires (UBA), the largest university in Argentina. Established in 1901 as the School of Architecture, it has since expanded to impart courses on graphic design and urbanism.

Most of the faculty's facilities are located at Pabellón III of the Ciudad Universitaria complex, the UBA's only centralized campus, in the Buenos Aires neighborhood of Núñez. As of 2011, it was the third-largest faculty at UBA, with 25,748 regular students.

== History ==
The University of Buenos Aires officially began imparting architecture degrees in 1901, becoming the first architecture school in Argentina. The department of architecture was in the beginning part of the Faculty of Exact, Physical, and Natural Sciences, which had its seat at the Manzana de las Luces complex, in Downtown Buenos Aires. Adjacent to the faculty were the Colegio Nacional de Buenos Aires and St. Ignatius' Church. The university counted with under a dozen architecture students up until 1912. In its early years, the Escuela de Arquitectura was heavily influenced by French schools of architecture, following the cues of Paris' École des beaux-arts.

The Faculty of Architecture and Urbanism was founded as an autonomous faculty in 1947, through Law 13.045 approved by the Argentine Senate following arduous debate. The first dean of the faculty was Ermete de Lorenzi. The Night of the Long Batons, in July 1966, marked the beginning of a difficult period for the faculty. Throughout the 1960s, the faculty had its seat at two warehouses near the Faculty of Law. Its name was changed to its current "Faculty of Architecture, Design and Urbanism" in 1985, when graphic design and other design disciplines were incorporated into the graduate course offer.

In 1966, the Faculty moved to its current seat in the Ciudad Universitaria complex, a purpose-built campus which originally intended to house most (if not all) UBA dependencies. Initially, the campus' Pabellón I would be assigned to the Faculty of Exact and Natural Sciences, Pabellón II to Philosophy and Letters, Pabellón III to Architecture and Urbanism, and Pabellón IV to Economic Sciences. The complex was also to house the rector's offices and the university's central library. Nowadays, FADU and the Faculty of Exact and Natural Sciences (FCEN) are the only two faculties to have their seat at Ciudad Universitaria, alongside a number of research centers and other minor facilities.

Like other UBA faculties and other universities across Argentina, FADU students and professors suffered persecution under the country's last military dictatorship, from 1976 to 1983. During the dictatorship, the faculty's handpicked dean was professor Héctor Corbacho, who taught technical drawing at the Navy's Escuela de Mecánica (ESMA). In 2005, a report estimated that up to 110 FADU students, professors and personnel were arbitrarily detained and disappeared during the dictatorship.

== Degrees ==
FADU presently offers seven graduate degrees:

- Architecture
- Graphic design
- Industrial design
- Textile design
- Image and sound design
- Licenciatura on Landscape Planning and Design (alongside FAUBA)

In addition, the faculty offers a number of specialization degrees, as well as magister degrees, doctorates and post-doctoral degrees.

== Political and institutional life ==
Like the rest of the University of Buenos Aires's faculties, FADU operates under the principle of tripartite co-governance, wherein authorities are democratically elected and professors, students and graduates are represented in the faculty's governing bodies. The faculty is headed by a Dean (Spanish: decano or decana), who presides over the Directive Council (Consejo Directivo). The Directive Council is made up of eight representatives for the professors, four representatives of the student body, and four representatives of the faculty's graduates. Deans are elected by the Directive Council every four years, while elections to the council take place every two years.

Since 2022, the dean of the Faculty of Medical Sciences has been DG Carlos Venancio, who was formerly vice-dean and assumed office upon the resignation of Guillermo Cabrera.

== Notable people ==
FADU has produced a number of prominent architects, renown both nationwide and internationally. Clorindo Testa, pioneer of the brutalist movement in Argentina, earned his degree at the (then) Faculty of Architecture in 1948. The rationalist Alberto Prebisch earned his degree at the School of Architecture (predecessor of FADU) in 1921; he would later become dean of the faculty in 1955. New York-based urban design theorist Diana Agrest graduated from FADU in 1967. Other known UBA-educated architects include Claudio Vekstein, organic architecture proponent Patricio Pouchulu, and the Uruguayan Rafael Viñoly, who designed the Cero+infinito building at Ciudad Universitaria, completed in 2021.
