= Núñez, Buenos Aires =

Coordinates: 34°33′S 58°28′W

Núñez
- Neighborhood
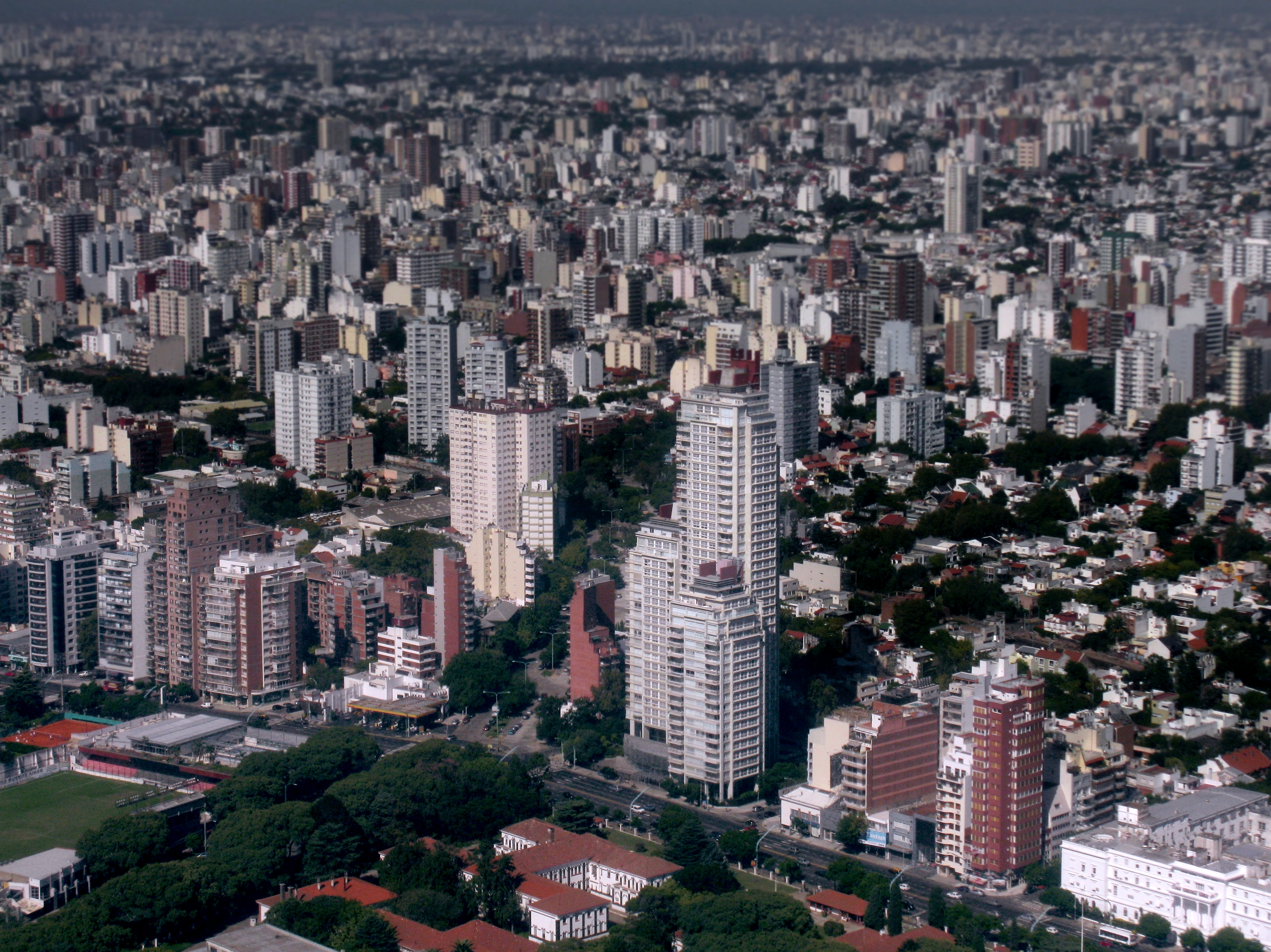
- Aerial view of Núñez

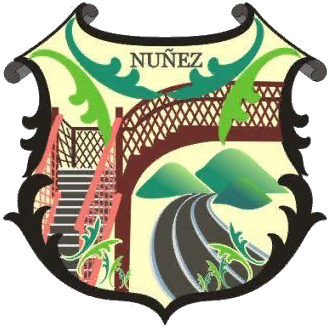
- Emblem
- Location of Núñez in Buenos Aires
- Country: Argentina
- Autonomous City: Buenos Aires
- Comuna: C13
- Important sites: Navy Mechanics School (ESMA); Universidad de Buenos Aires

Area
  - Total: 3.9 km^{2} (1.5 sq mi)

Population (2001)
  - Total: 53,005
  - Density: 14,000/km^{2} (35,000/sq mi)
- Time zone: UTC-3 (ART)

Núñez is a barrio or neighbourhood of Buenos Aires, Argentina. It is on the northern edge of the city on the banks of the Rio de la Plata. The barrio of Belgrano is to the southeast; Saavedra and Coghlan are to the west; and Vicente López, in Buenos Aires Province, is to the north.

The barrio has an area of 3.9 km^{2} and a population of over 50,000. It is bounded by Avenida Cabildo and Avenida Congreso, Crisólogo Larralde, Zapiola, Udaondo and Cantilo Streets, and Avenida General Paz.

== History ==
It was founded by Don Florencio Emeterio Núñez, along with the neighbouring barrio of Saavedra, both suburbs of Buenos Aires at the time. On Sunday, April 17, 1873, the local Mitre Line station opened, bringing 2,000 people for a banquet and speeches. Following that event, the land was parcelled and building commenced. Núñez donated the land for the railway station, hence the station and the neighbourhood bear his name.

The area is quite built-up with apartments and much commercial activity, especially along Avenida Cabildo and Avenida del Libertador. Residential streets are generally smart and upmarket, with leafy villas, just like much of the rest of the north of the city. There are two squares: Plaza Balcarce and Plaza Félix Lima. Between Avenida del Libertador and the shore, there are large areas of open space, including sports clubs, the extensive High-performance Athletics Center, and recreational areas.

One of the area's newest green spaces, the Parque de los Niños (English: Children's Park), opened in 1999, was the site of a "city beach" inaugurated by Mayor Mauricio Macri in early 2009. It lacks access to the water, but features an acre-sized sandlot and beach umbrellas. This was the first of several similar new parks in the city.

== Main sights ==
- The Navy Petty-Officers School of Mechanics (ESMA), scene of many of the worst atrocities of the Dirty War
- Ciudad Universitaria, campus of the University of Buenos Aires (UBA), which houses the Faculty of Exact and Natural Sciences, and the Faculty of Architecture, Design and Urbanism, among other UBA faculties.
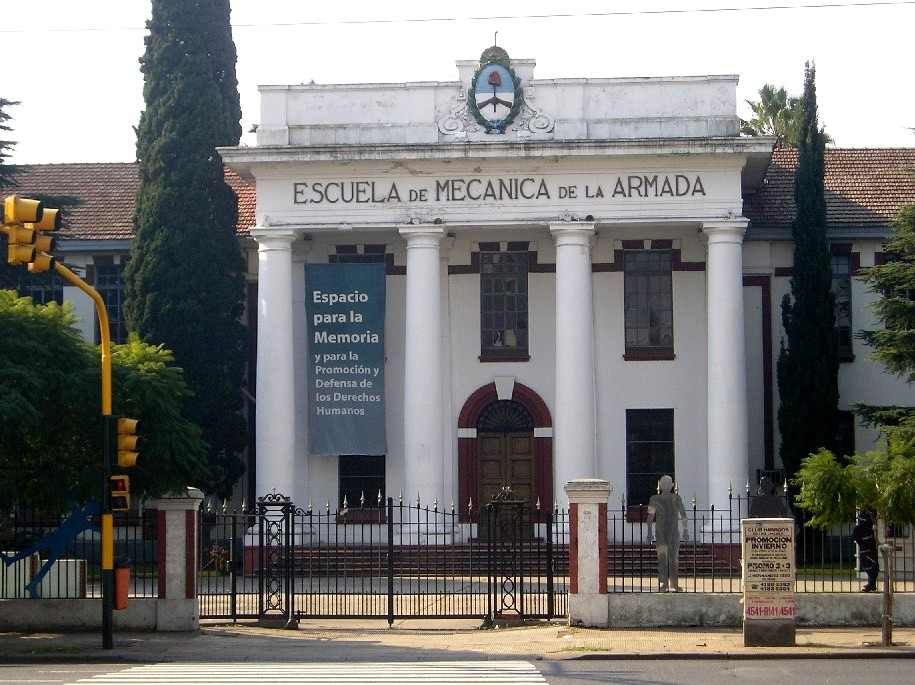
The former Navy Petty-Officers School of Mechanics, today the Museum of Remembrance

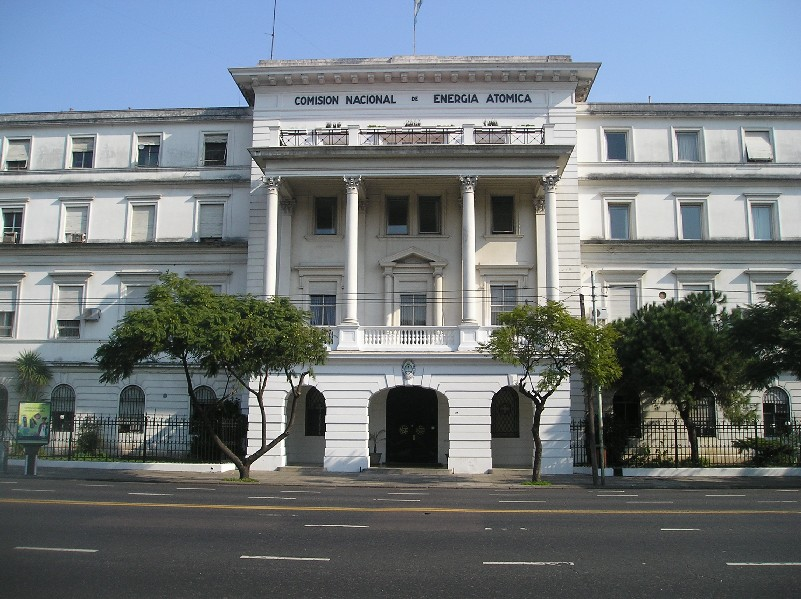
The National Atomic Energy Commission

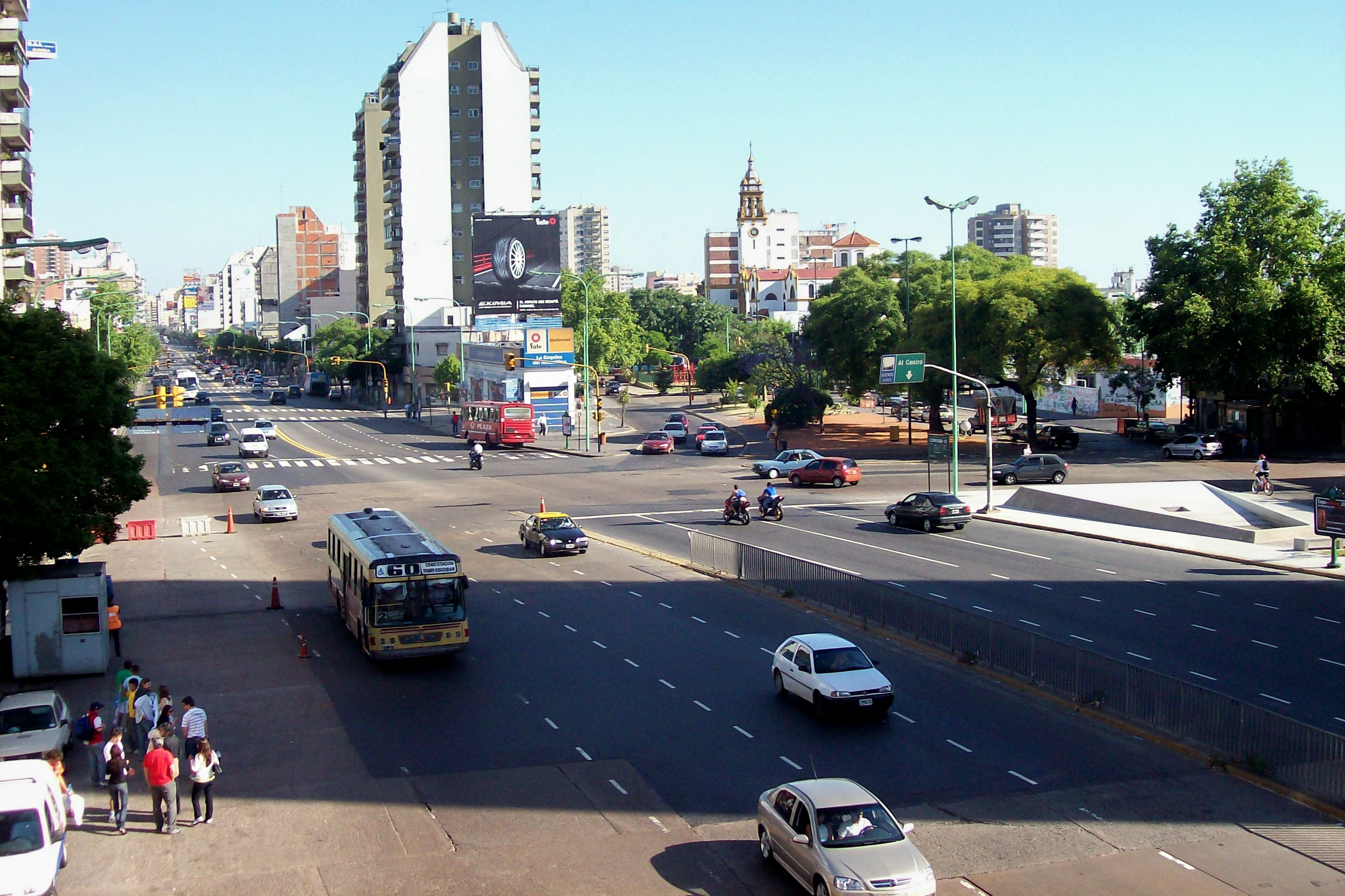
Avenida Cabildo

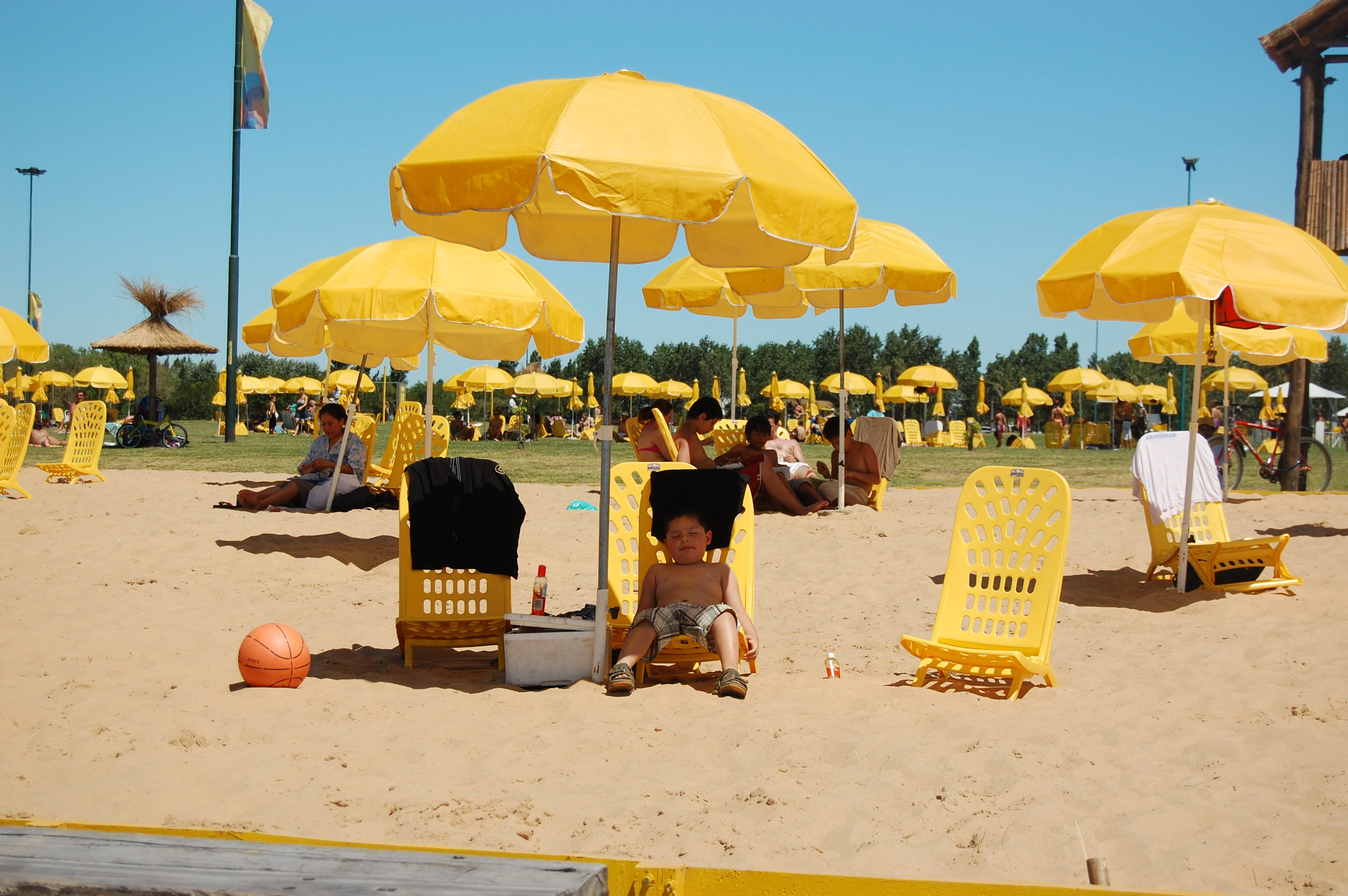
Parque de los Niños

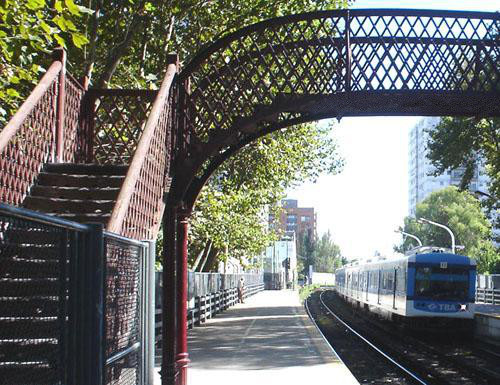
Núñez train station.
