= Ciudad Universitaria, Buenos Aires =

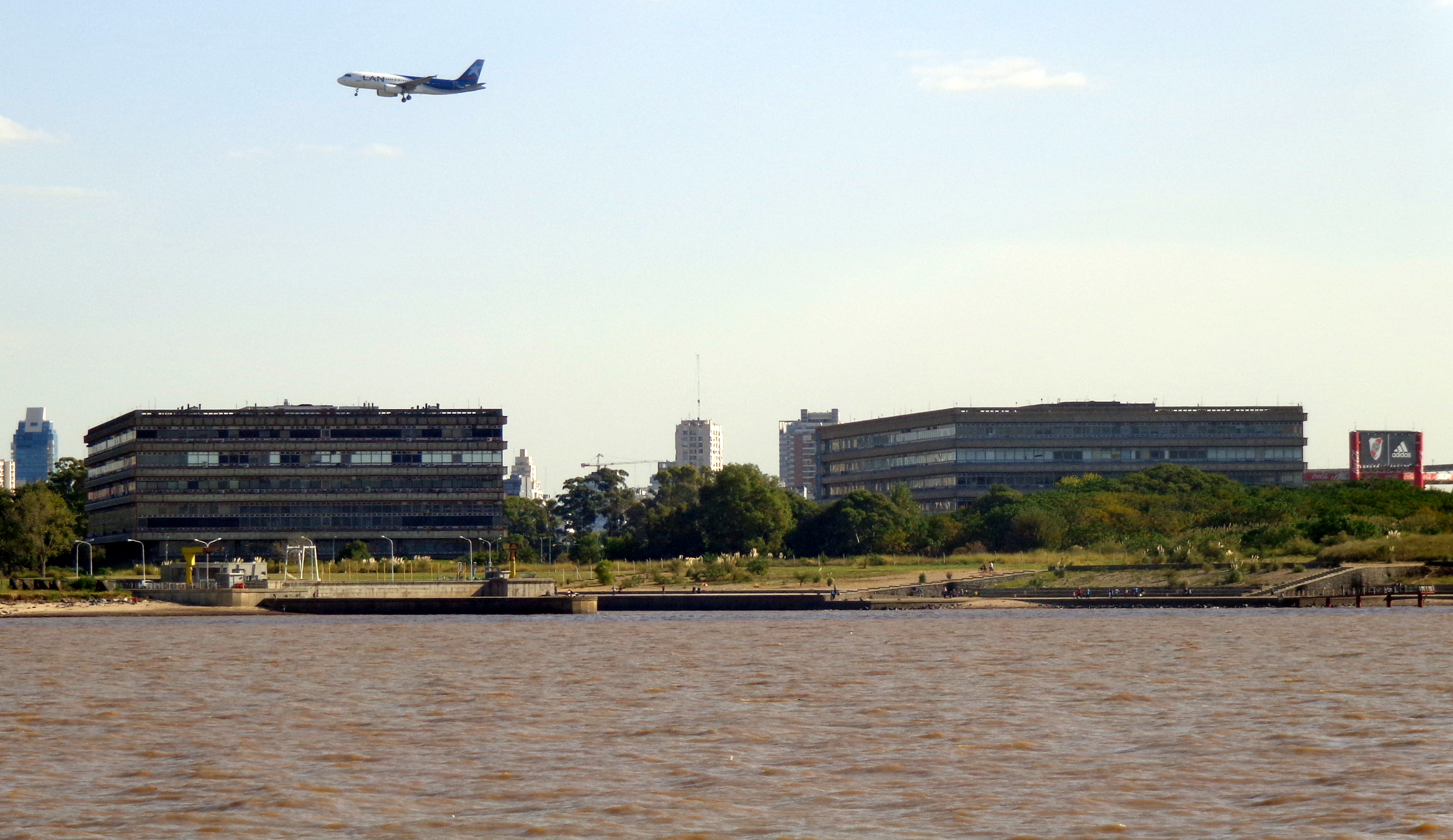
- View from the Río de la Plata

Location
- Campus
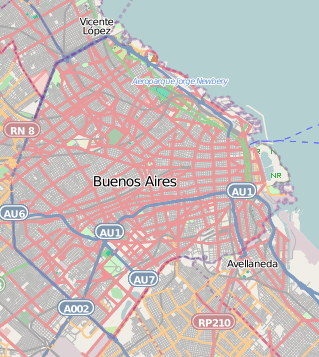
- Location within Buenos Aires
- Coordinates: 34°32′29″S 58°26′35″W
- Country: Argentina
- City: Buenos Aires
- District: Núñez

Ciudad Universitaria ("University City") is an urban campus of the University of Buenos Aires, the largest and most prestigious university in Argentina. Originally designed as a potential centralized campus for all of the university's facilities, nowadays it only houses two of its thirteen faculties: the Faculty of Architecture, Design and Urbanism and the Faculty of Exact and Natural Sciences, as well as a number of dependent institutes and a sports center.

It is located in the Belgrano district of Buenos Aires, on the far-northern side of the city. The complex sits on the banks of the Río de la Plata and boasts one of the city's largest green areas, as parts of it are presently an ecological reserve.

== Overview ==
Ciudad Universitaria is located on the limit between the northern Buenos Aires barrios of Belgrano and Núñez, on the banks of the Río de la Plata. It is within walking distance of Club Atlético River Plate's Estadio Monumental and the Aeroparque Jorge Newbery, one of Buenos Aires' two international airports.

Within Ciudad Universitaria, the three buildings housing the Faculty of Architecture, Design and Urbanism (FADU) and the Faculty of Exact and Natural Sciences (FCEN) are known as pabellones ("pavilion"). Pabellón I and Pabellón II house FCEN, while Pabellón III houses FADU. The lower floors and basement-level floors of Pabellón III also house the Ciudad Universitaria branch of the Ciclo Básico Común, the university's entrance course. Adjacent to Pabellón I are the buildings of the INGEIS and IAFE, as well as the Pabellón de Industrias.

Ciudad Universitaria is accessible through different means of public transport, such as bus lines (lines 28, 33, 34, 37, 42, 45, 107 and 160 all serve the complex) and train (through the Belgrano Norte Line's Ciudad Universitaria station).

From 2005 to 2006, UBA operated a free-of-cost bus line that connected the three main buildings. It was known as Transporte Interno Ciudad Universitaria.

== History ==
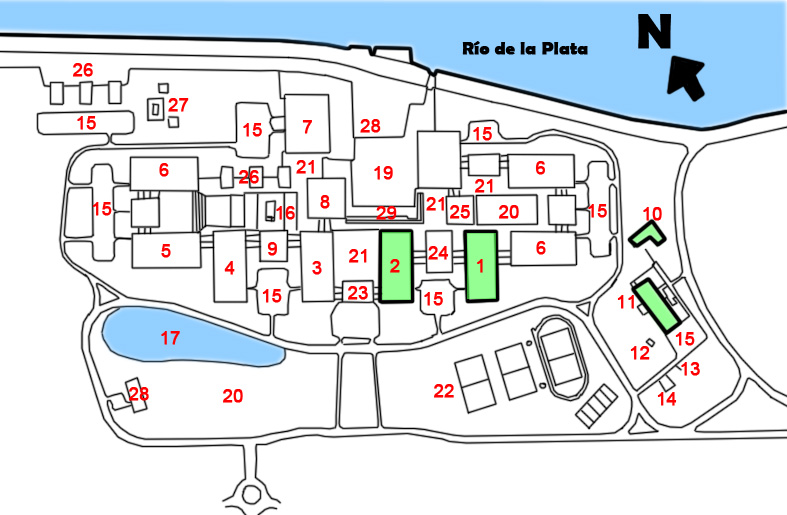
Ciudad Universitaria as envisioned in the 1959 masterplan. In light green, the only buildings erected following this plan.

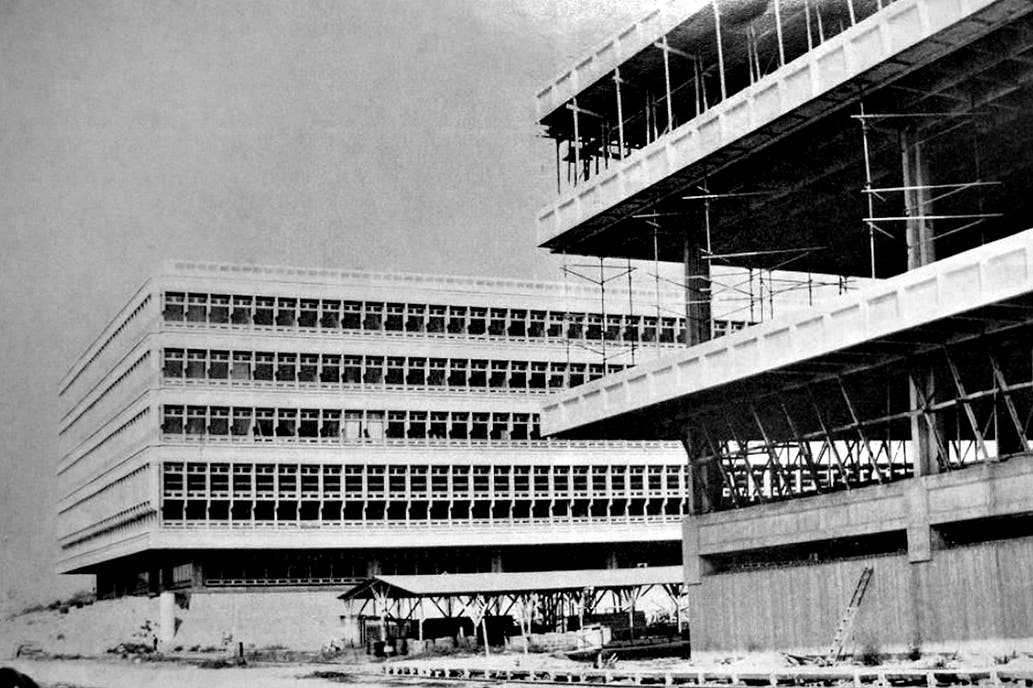
Pabellón I and Pabellón II under construction in 1969.

Founded in 1821, the University of Buenos Aires had its first seat on Perú street, in what is now known as the Manzana de las Luces, a compound previously owned by the Society of Jesus. Toward the 1950s, some of the university's faculties still had to use old, overcrowded buildings, leading to proposals to establish a centralized campus for the university somewhere in Buenos Aires. One of these, for instance, proposed the establishment of a "university city" in the empty terrains where the Aeroparque Jorge Newbery now stands.

In 1956, the university began developing a modernization plan which included the establishment of a "Commission for the Construction of a University City", formed by academics and architects such as Alberto Prebisch. The original plan sought to benefit the most relegated faculties in the university first, envisioning a staggered construction plan. Initially, the campus' Pabellón I would be assigned to the Faculty of Exact and Natural Sciences, Pabellón II to Philosophy and Letters, Pabellón III to Architecture and Urbanism, and Pabellón IV to Economic Sciences. The complex was also to house the rector's offices and the university's central library. Nowadays, FADU and FCEN are the only two faculties to have their seat at Ciudad Universitaria, alongside a number of research centers and other minor facilities.

In 1958, during the administration of Rector Risieri Frondizi, a decree issued by the President of Argentina granted the terrains where Ciudad Universitaria presently stands to the University of Buenos Aires. The terrains were land reclaimed from the Río de la Plata on the Northern end of Buenos Aires City, in the neighborhood of Belgrano. The blueprints followed a proposal by Swiss architect Le Corbusier from 1938 (in collaboration with Jorge Ferrari Hardoy and Kurchan), and re-adapted by the city government's 1962 Plan Regulador. The final projects were drawn in 1959 by a team of FADU architects, made up of Francisco and Raúl Rossi, Elio Vivaldi, Enrique Massarotti, Alberto Trozzoli and Florencio Alvo.

The original plan was never completed all the way through. Out of the over twenty envisioned buildings, only two were completed in the style of the masterplan. The government of President José María Guido scrapped the original plan and decided to launch a new contest to find a new masterplan proposal. The winners of the contest were US-based architects Eduardo Catalano and Horacio Caminos, alongside engineer Federico Camba. The following year, the new plan was approved, and construction started on Pabellón I, which was to house the FCEN departments of mathematics, physics and meteorology. This first building was completed in 1961 and additionally house the Instituto de Cálculo. The Pabellón de Industrias was finished shortly afterwards.

=== Ciudad Universitaria today ===
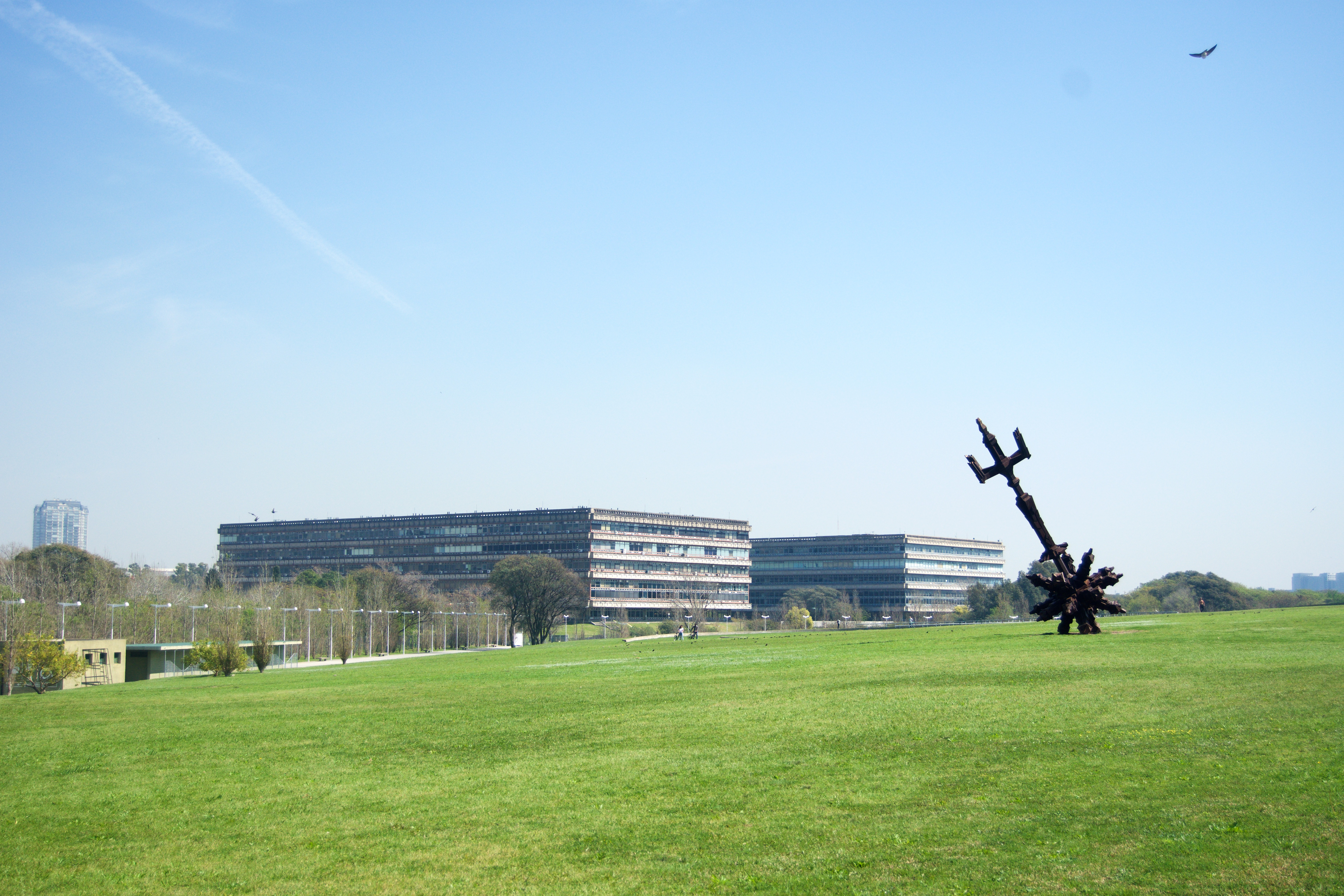
View of Pabellón II and Pabellón III from the Parque de la Memoria, with Towers of Memory by Norberto Gómez in the foreground

Pabellón III, the third-largest building in the plan, originally designed to house the Faculty of Philosophy and Letters, was re-designed to house the Faculty of Architecture and Urbanism, which began operating in the building in 1971. Pabellón II had been completed the year prior in 1970. Construction work had already begun on Pabellón IV. A second stage for the project envisioned further land reclamation in order to construct the rest of the masterplan's buildings. These plans were scrapped abruptly following the 1976 coup d'état. To this day, only the groundwork of Pabellón IV remains.

A number of proposals to finish the original masterplan have surged since the return of democracy in 1983. A 2006 proposal to finally erect Pabellón V and grant it to the Faculty of Psychology even won a bidding contest in the name of the architecture firm Diéguez-Fridman, but the proposal was never followed through.

During the 1980s a number of smaller buildings were completed near Pabellón I. These were granted to the two CONICET institutes affiliated with UBA, the Instituto de Astronomía y Física del Espacio (IAFE), designed by Rodolfo Livingston, and the Instituto de Geocronología y Geología Isotópica (INGEIS), both completed in 1984. In 1986, FADU's Secretariat of University Habitat drew an "urbanization plan" with participation of Mederico Faivre, Carlos Maffeis, María Cecilia Ceim, Mario Sacco, among other architects. The plan envisioned the construction of a new railway station within Ciudad Universitaria to grant better access to the complex, a pedestrian street connecting all of the complex's buildings, new housing projects for students and professors, two public parks, an open area for street vendors, among other initiatives. By 1988, only the pedestrian access connecting FADU and FCEN had been completed.

The two public parks proposed by the 1986 urbanization plan were finished in the 2000s, when they were re-envisioned as the Parque de la Memoria, which opened in 2005. Recent developments in Ciudad Universitaria include a new building for the Instituto de Fisiología, Biología Molecular y Neurociencias (IFiByNe) and the Cero + Infinito building, designed by Rafael Viñoly and Sebastián Ceria, which serves as an annex for FCEN. Cero + Infinito was completed in 2019. The Ciudad Universitaria railway station was opened in 2015, connecting the complex to the Belgrano Norte railway line.

== Settlements and occupations ==
In the early 1990s, a settlement formed by a gay community known as "La Aldea" or "Villa Gay" was founded in the vacant lots adjacent to Pabellón I. The settlement's population grew over time, and its composition went from a gay collective to a mostly mixed population. At its height, up to 100 people lived in the settlement before they were forced to leave in July 1998. Many of them were resettled in hotels and shelters operated by the city government.

Illegal settlements continued to grow in the area even after the eviction of Villa Gay. In 2006, as part of the construction plans of the Parque de la Memoria, the city government demolished and burned a number of precarious homes where up to 87 families had been living.

In 2007, a group of people founded a self-described "eco-village" named Velatropa in the abandoned groundwork of Pabellón V. The village's homes were built using recycled plastic and clay. Velatropa was relatively tolerated by UBA authorities and received benevolent media treatment, being featured in news reports and documentaries. The settlement was evicted in November 2018 by the city government, which alleged it was temporarily displacing Velatropa's inhabitants due to security concerns regarding the upcoming G20 Summit, to be held some 7 kilometers away from the place. The settlement's inhabitants, however, were not allowed to return and Velatropa was eventually demolished.

== Facilities ==
At present, Ciudad Universitaria houses the following institutions (all dependent on the University of Buenos Aires):

- Faculty of Architecture, Design and Urbanism (FADU),
- Faculty of Exact and Natural Sciences (FCEN)
- Faculty of Engineering (FIUBA; Pabellón de Industrias)
- Instituto de Astronomía y Física del Espacio
- Instituto de Geocronología y Geología Isotópica
- Instituto de Química Física de los Materiales, Medio Ambiente y Energía

== Gallery ==
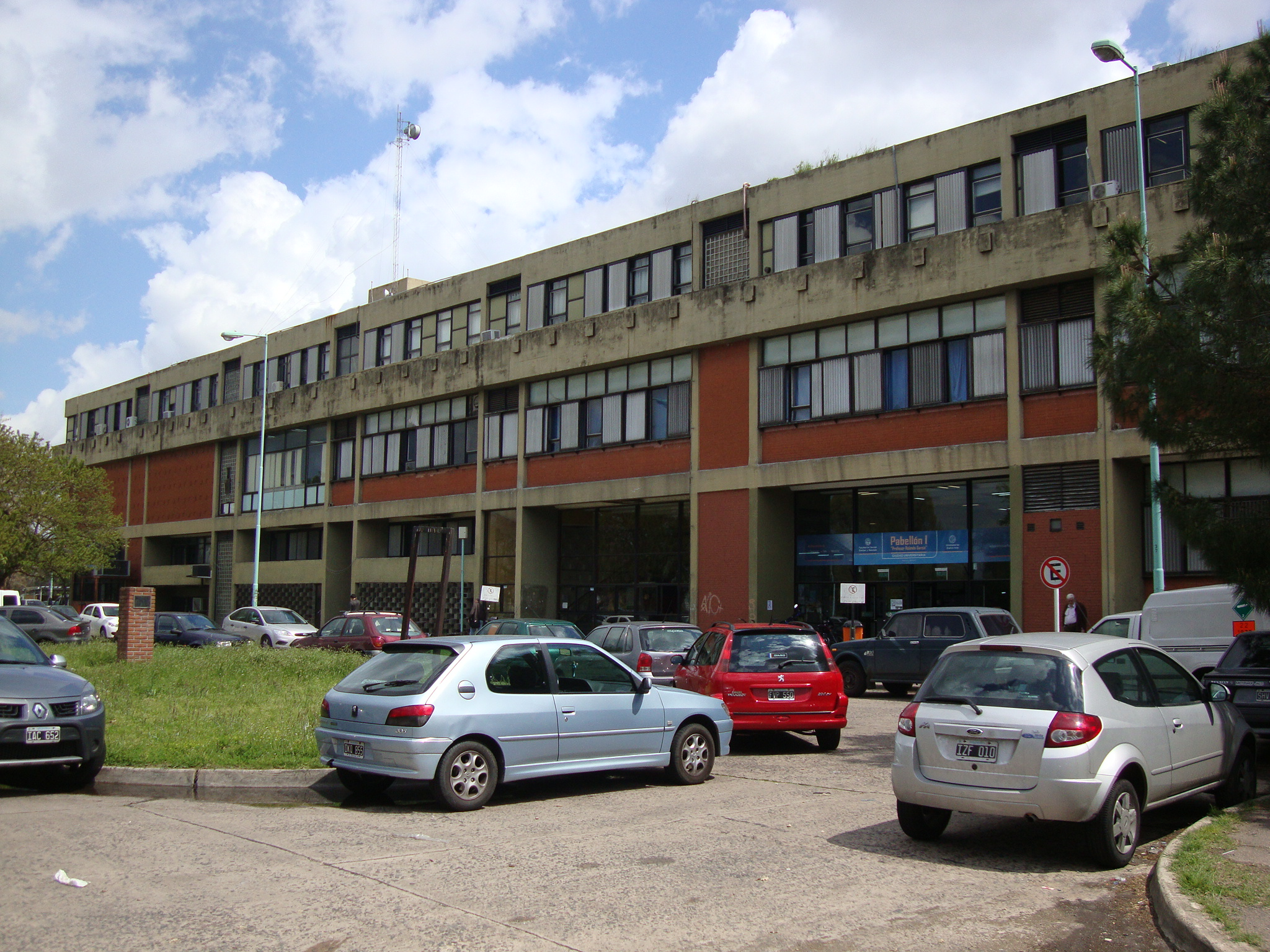
Pabellón I (FCEN)

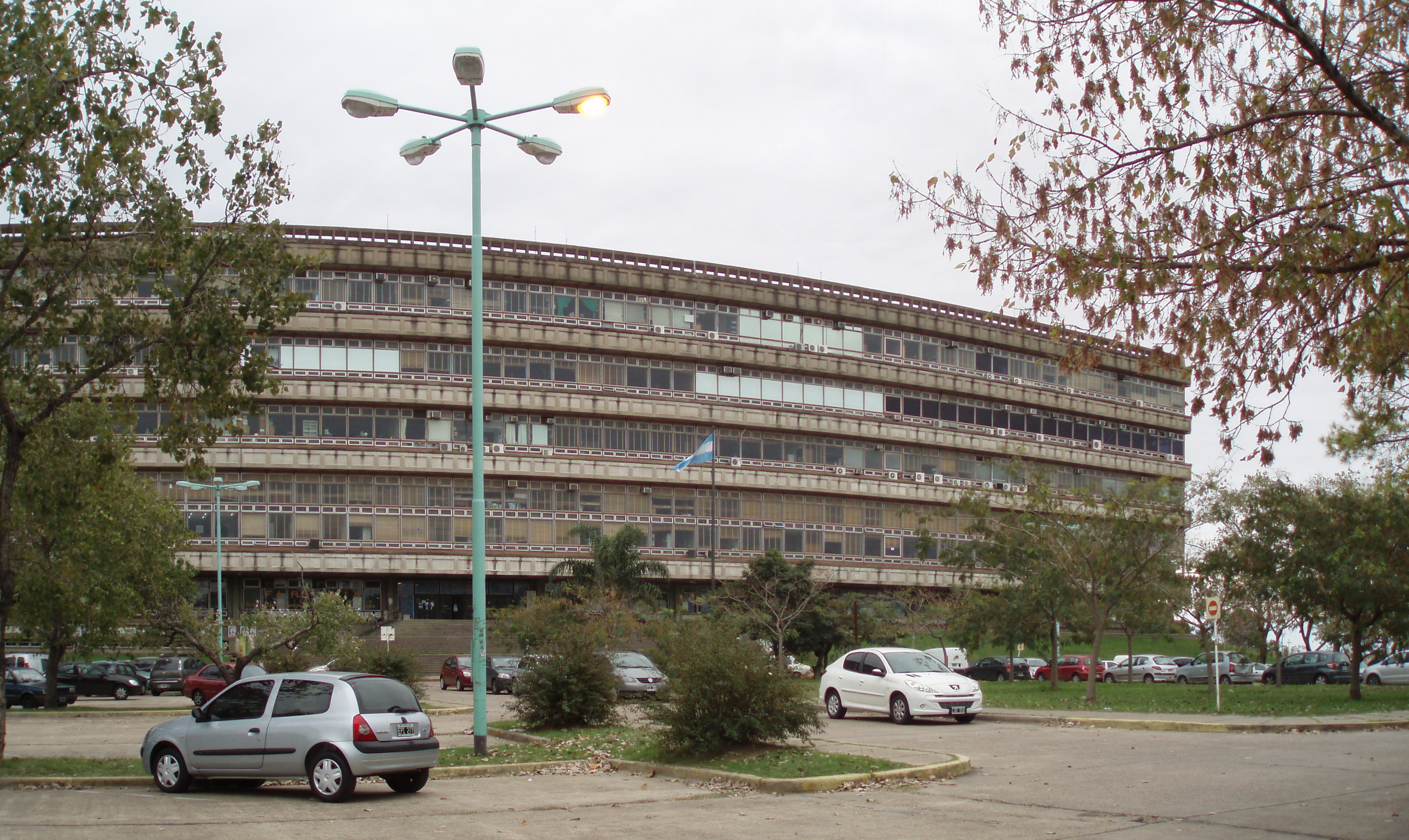
Pabellón II (FCEN)

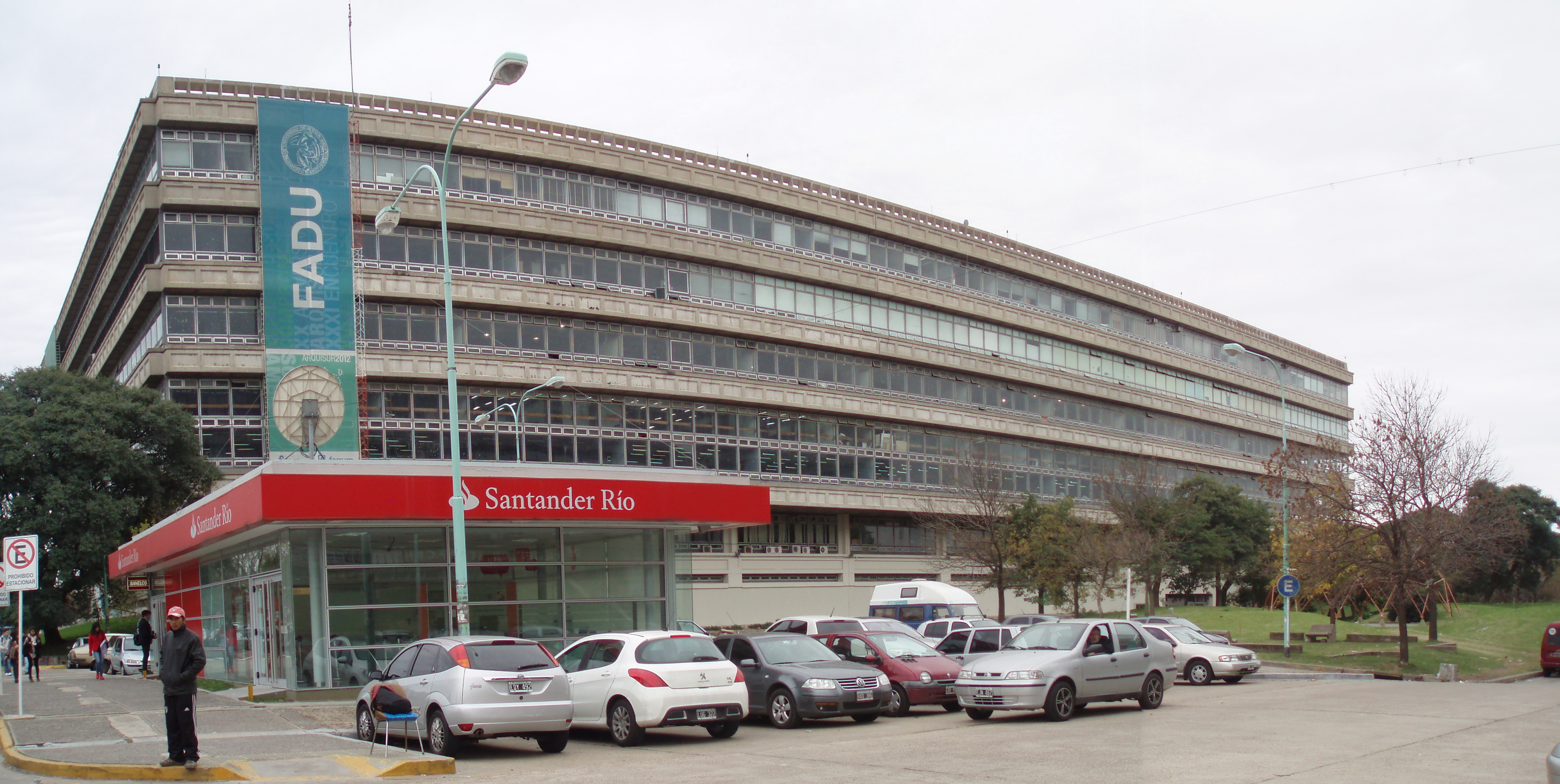
Pabellón III (FADU)

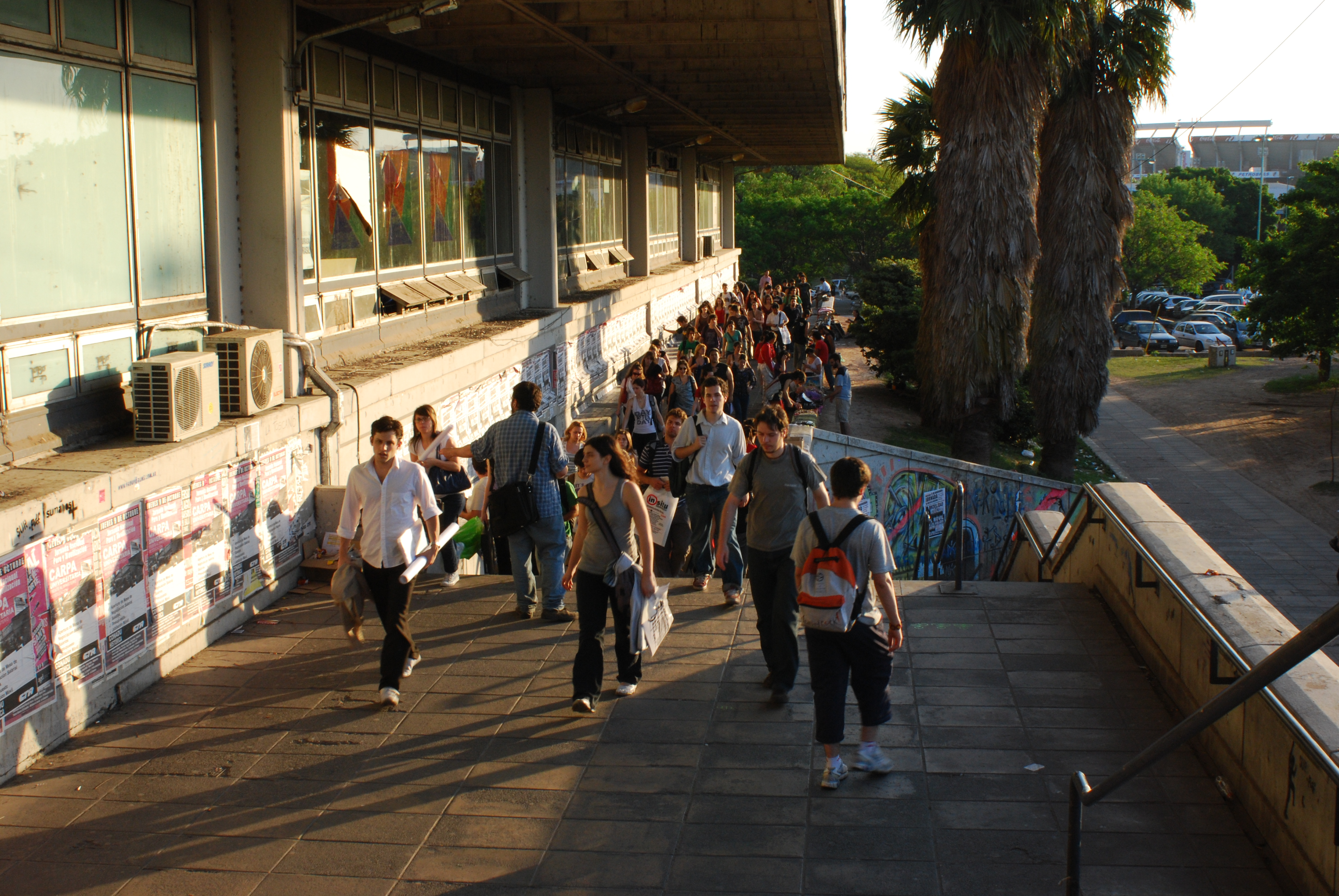
Entrance to FADU

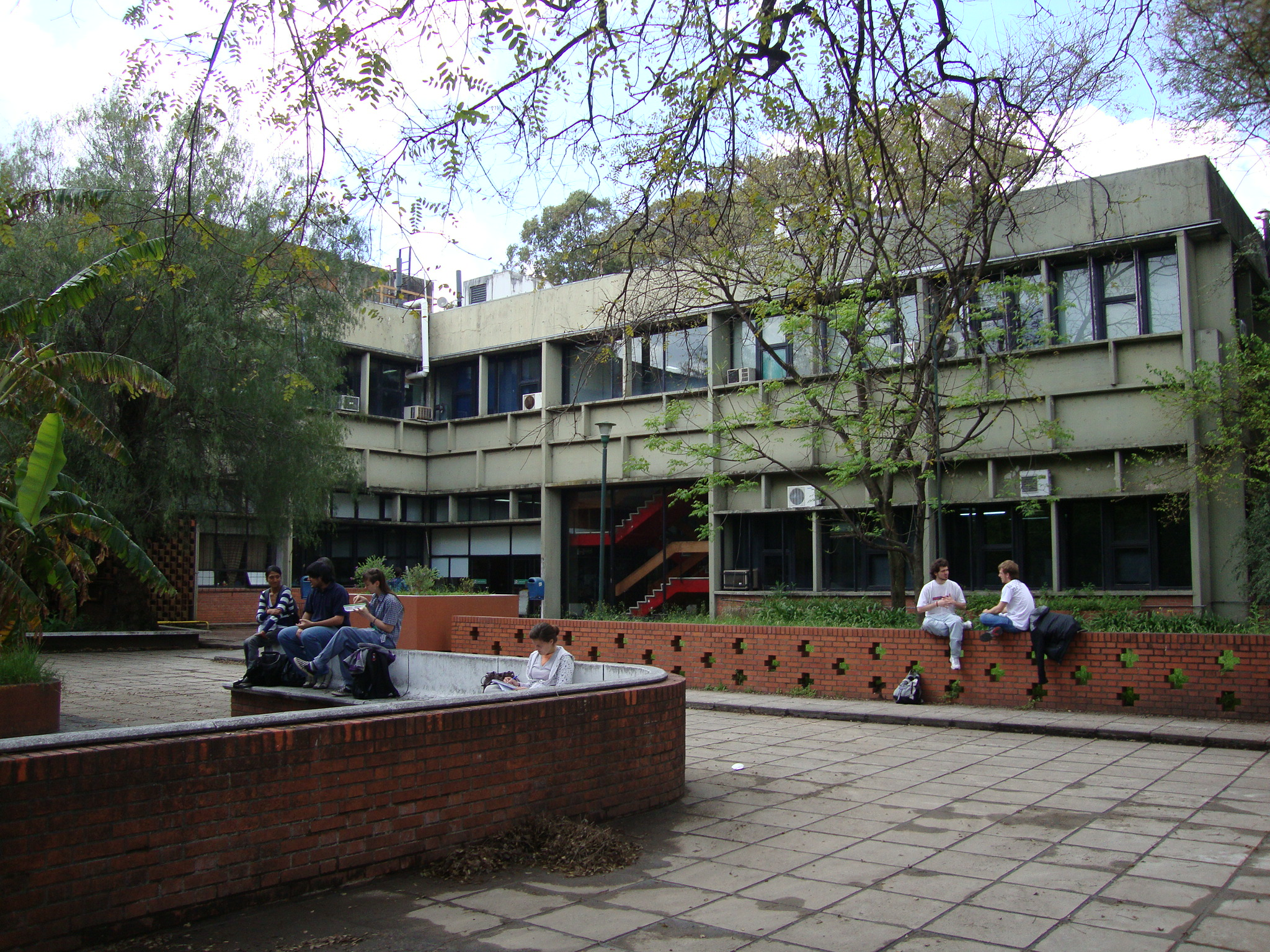
Pabellón de Industrias
(FCEN–FIUBA)

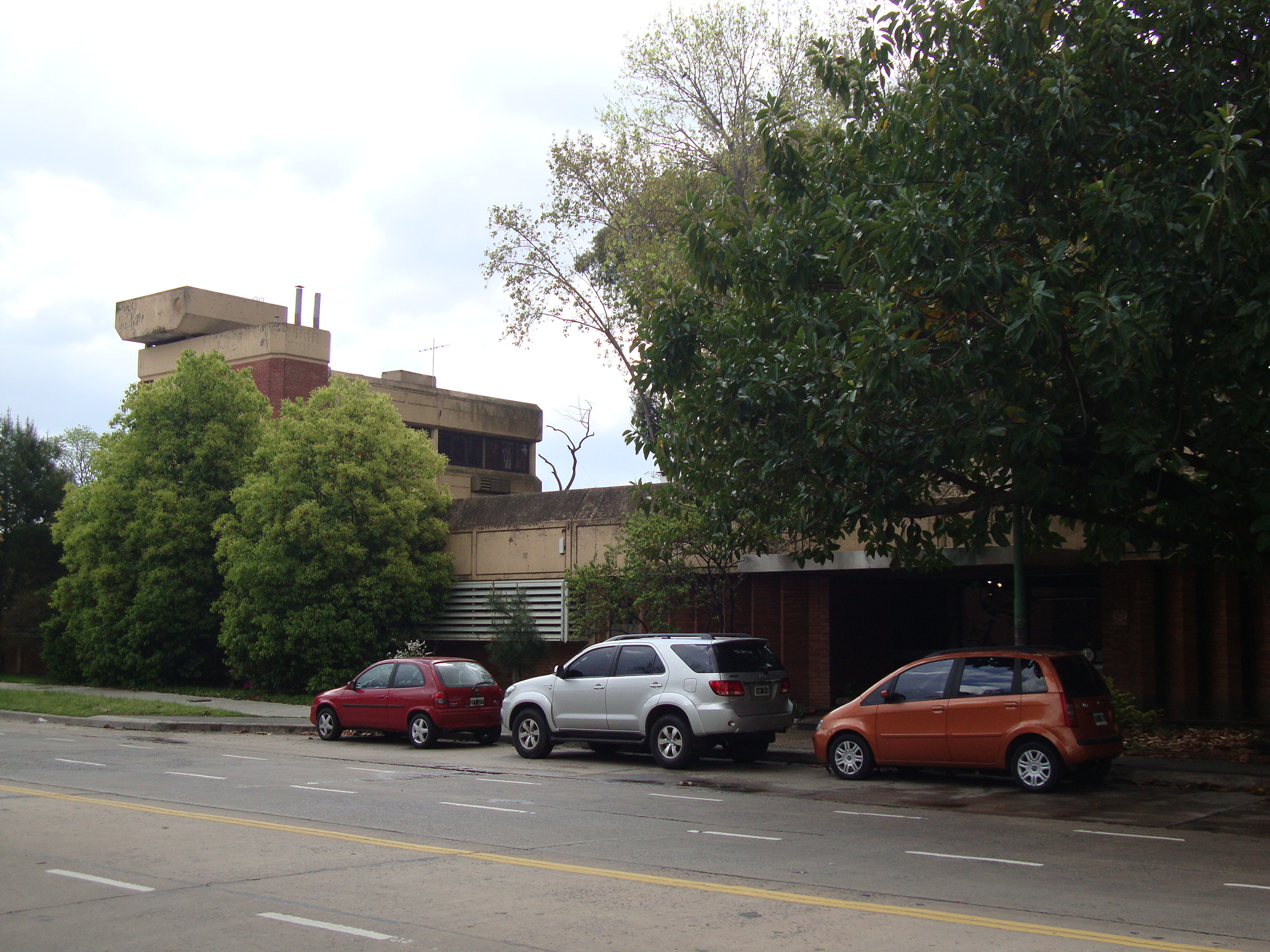
Instituto de Geocronología y Geología Isotópica (INGEIS)

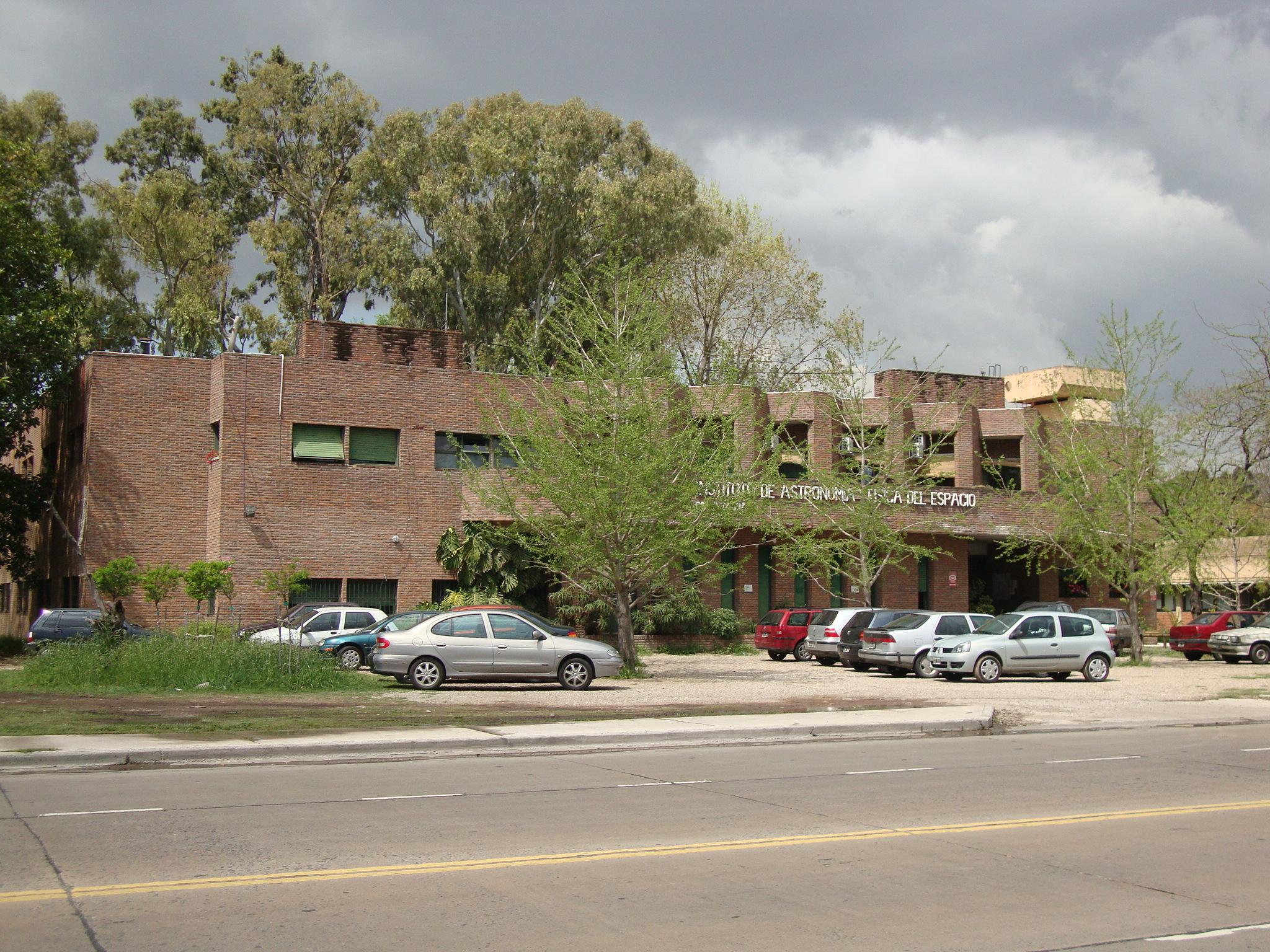
Instituto de Astronomía y Física del Espacio (IAFE)

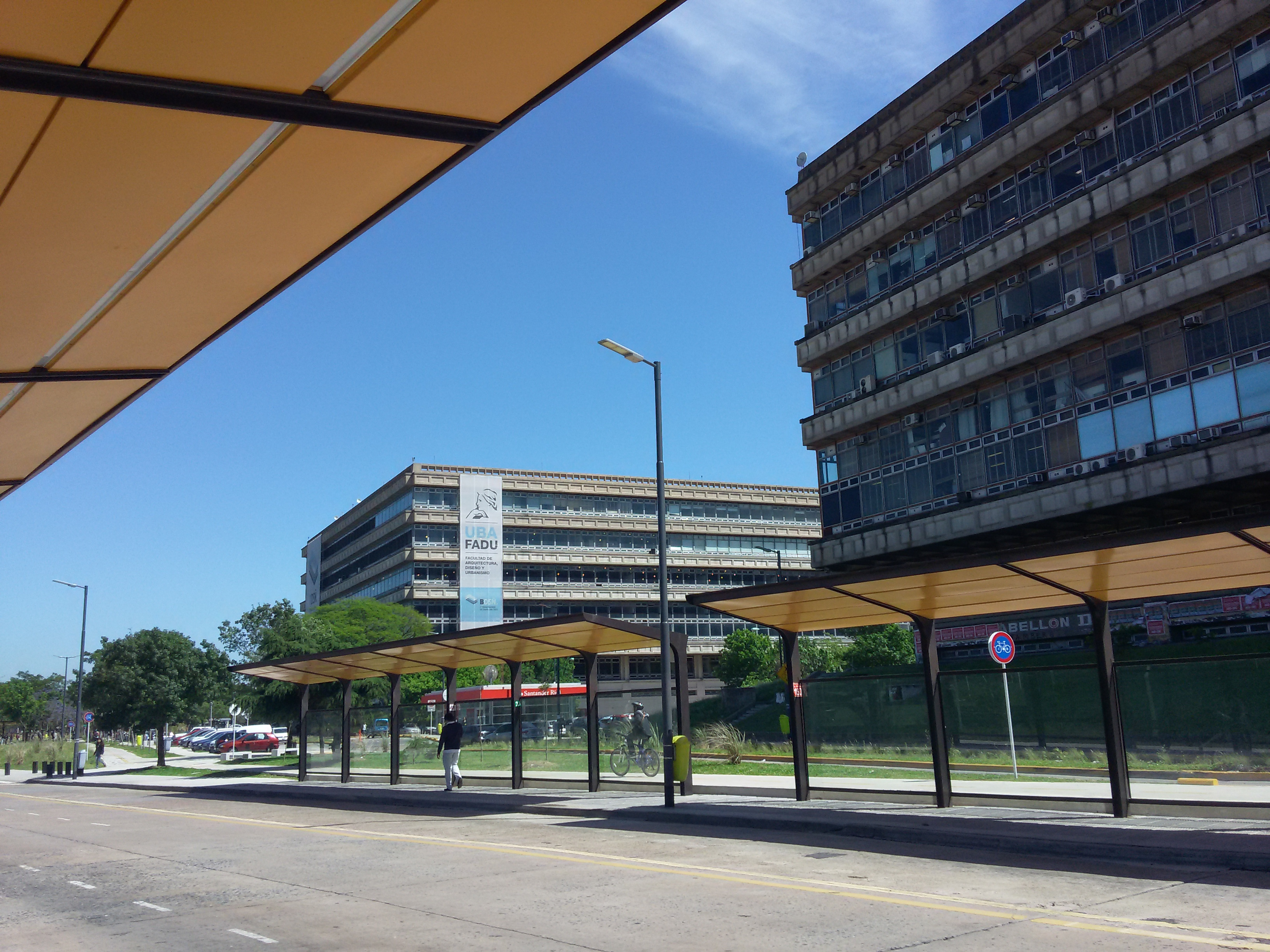
Bus stops

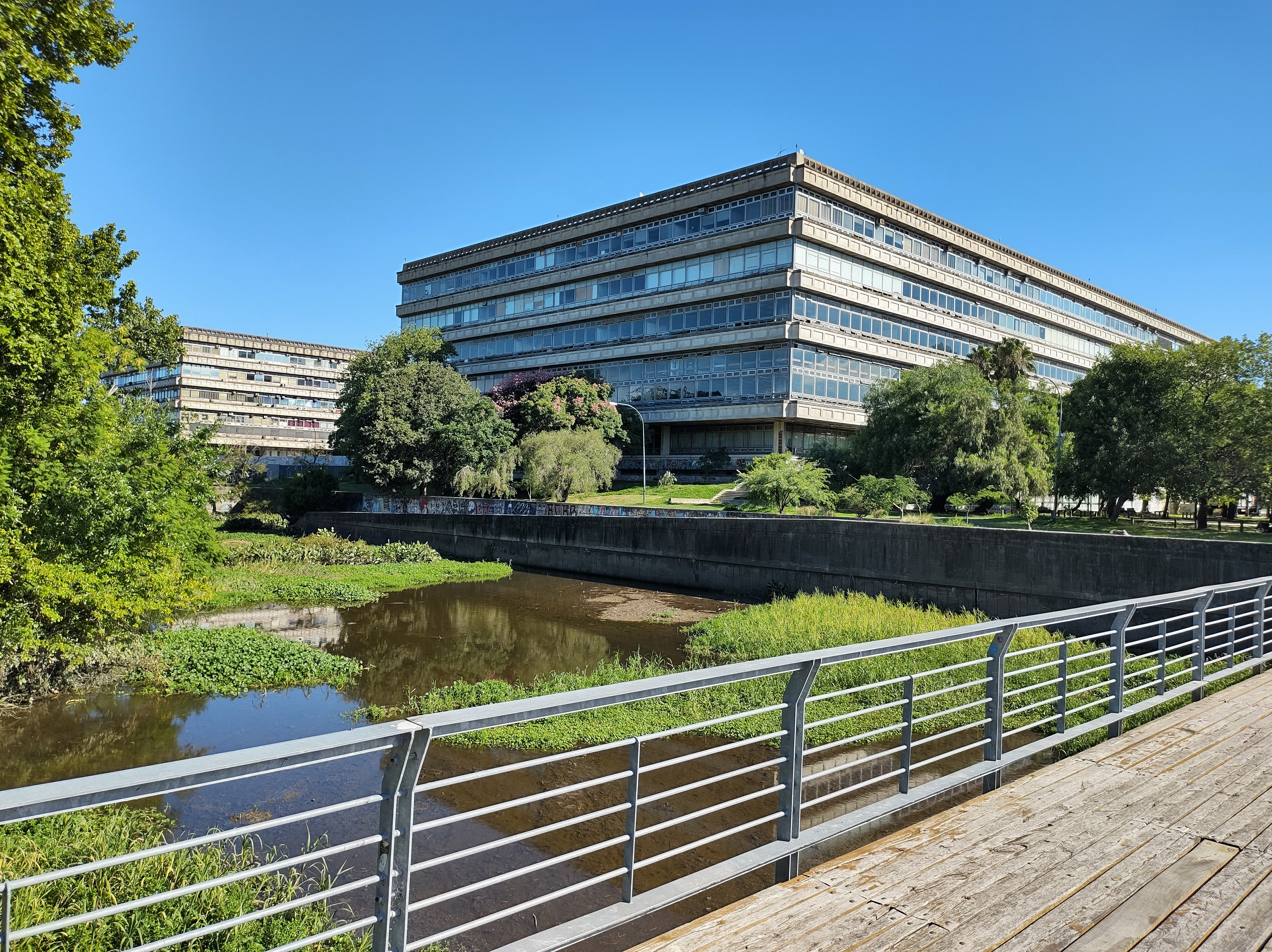
View from the Ecological Reserve

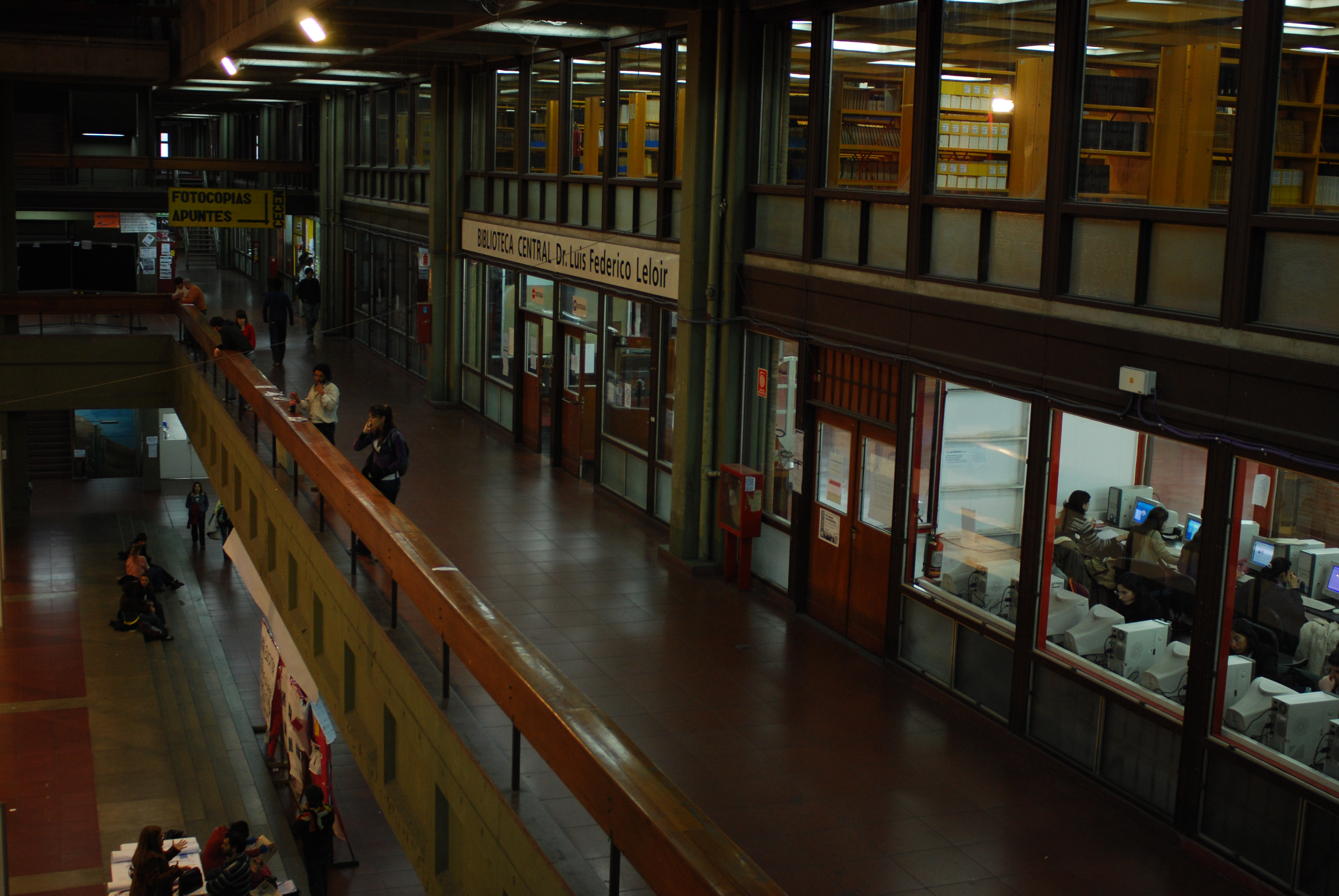
FCEN Dr. Federico Luis Leloir Library in Pabellón II

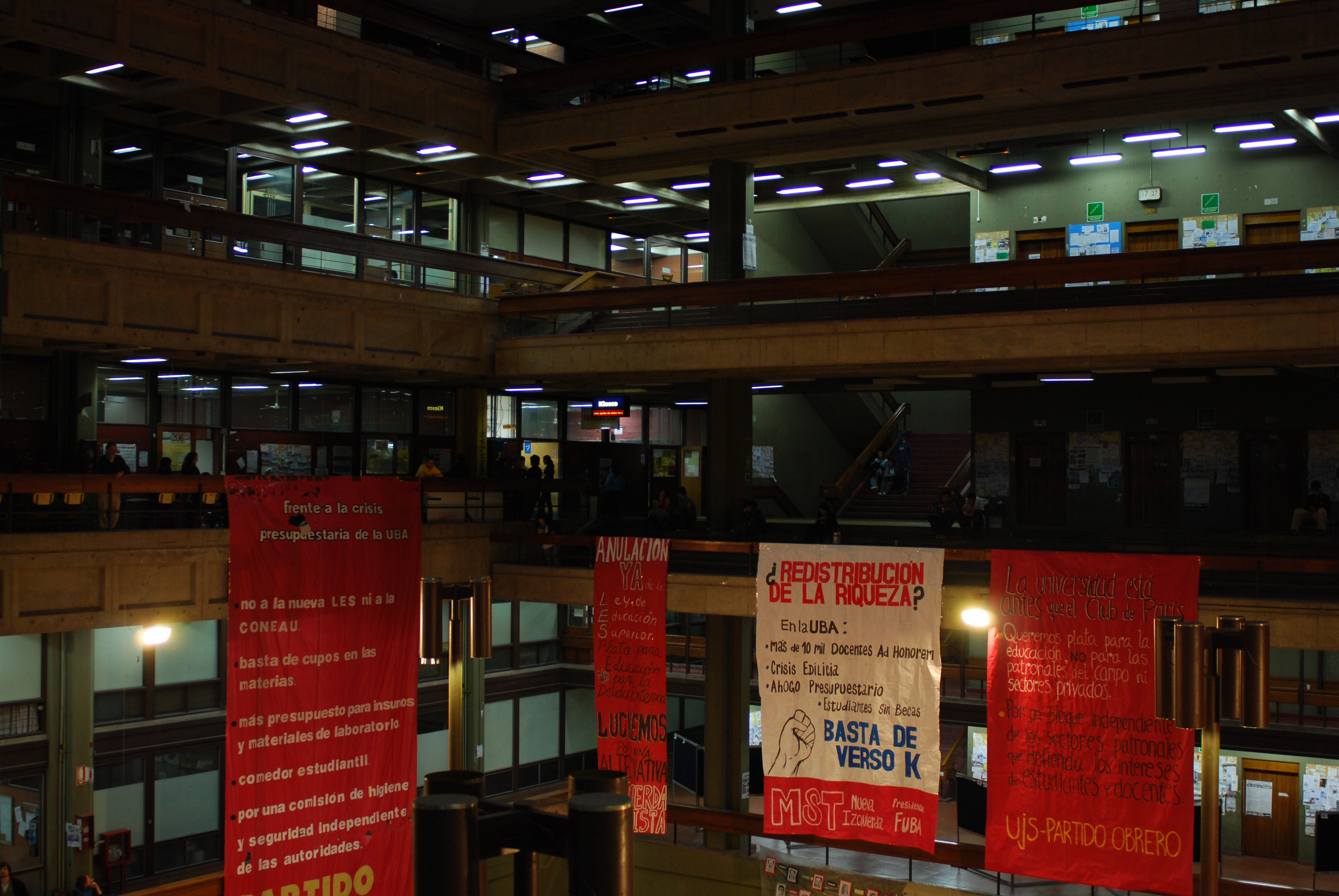
Central patio, Pabellón II

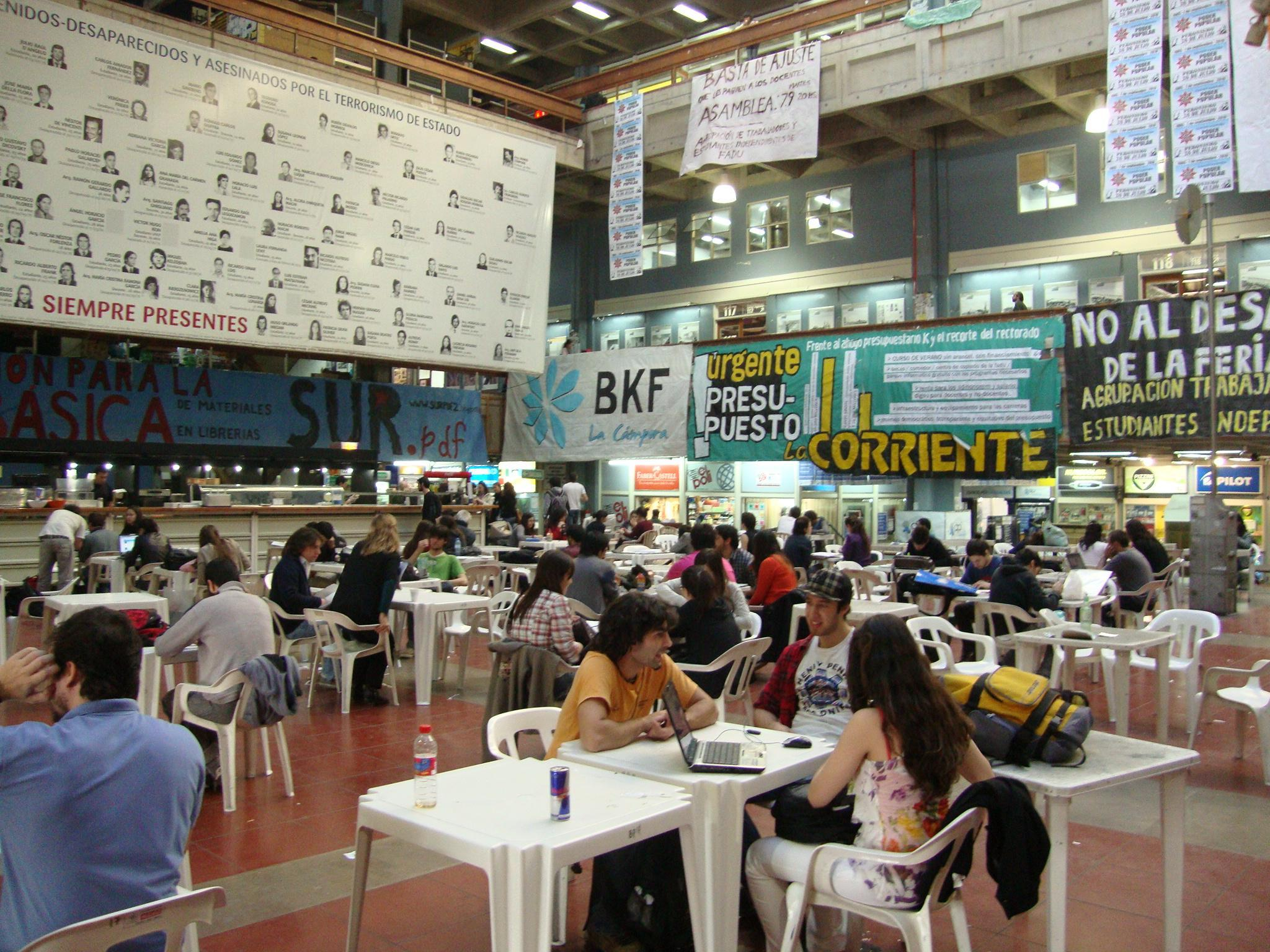
Central patio, Pabellón III
