= Instituto de Química Física de los Materiales, Medio Ambiente y Energía =

Argentine research center

Institute of Physicochemistry of Materials, Environment, and Energy
- Other name: INQUIMAE
- Parent institution: Universidad de Buenos Aires and CONICET
- Established: September 16, 1992; 34 years ago (as a UBA institute); 1995; 31 years ago (as a CONICET institute)
- Head: Dr. Darío Estrin
- Address: Pabellón II, Ciudad Universitaria
- Location: Buenos Aires, Argentina
- Coordinates: 34.5409°S 58.44342°W
- Interactive map of Institute of Physicochemistry of Materials, Environment, and Energy
- Website: INQUIMAE.FCEN.UBA.ar

The Institute of Physicochemistry of Materials, Environment and Energy (Spanish: Instituto de Química-Física de Materiales, Medio Ambiente y Energía; INQUIMAE) is a chemistry research centre with double dependence shared among the University of Buenos Aires (UBA) and Argentina's national research council CONICET. It is located at the Faculty of Exact and Natural Sciences Pabellón II building, in the Ciudad Universitaria complex.

== Purpose ==
Promote basic and applied quality research in the areas or inorganic chemistry, materials, analytics and physical chemistry. Contributing thus to technological development, from its fundamental aspects up to their implementation, while focusing on local, national and regional relevance issues.

== History ==
Created in 1992 as an institute of the Universidad de Buenos Aires, in 1995 it became also a CONICET institute.

Its first director was Dr. Roberto Fernández Prini along with Dr. José Antonio Olabe as vicedirector. In May 2008 Dr. Ernesto J. Calvo became director after a public competition for the position. Dr. Darío Estrin is the current director.

In 2007 the seminaries classroom was named Roberto Fernández Prini to honor its founding director.

== Research areas ==
- Bioinorganics, Bioanalytics y Biophysical chemistry
- Coordination compounds
- Energy
- Materials
- Environment
- Environmental chemistry
- Sensors and devices
- Surfaces and interfaces
