= Faculty of Exact and Natural Sciences =

- Facultad de Ciencias Exactas y Naturales
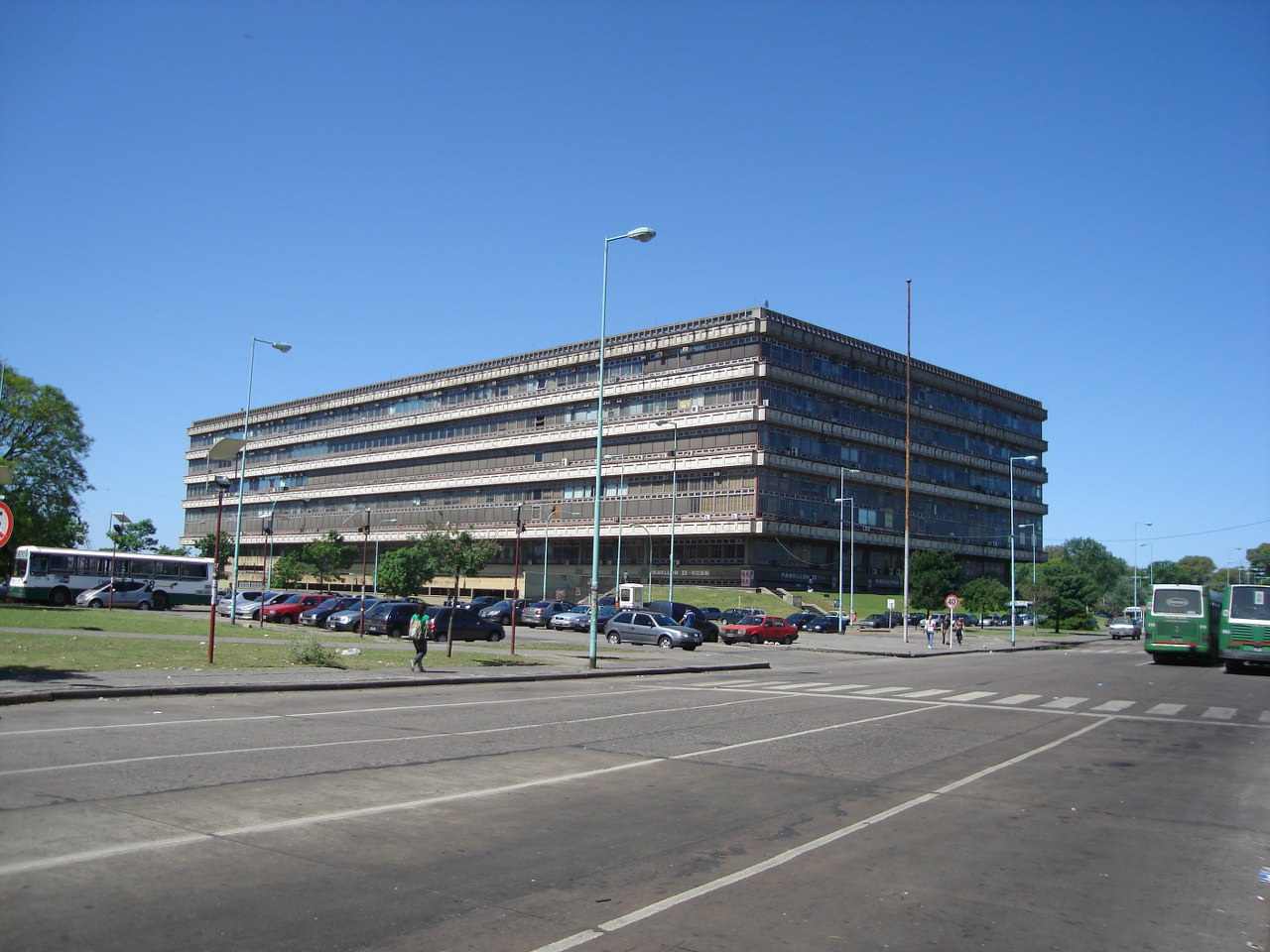
- Faculty building in Belgrano, Buenos Aires
- Type: Faculty
- Established: 1891; 135 years ago
- Affiliations: University of Buenos Aires
- Dean: Guillermo Durán
- Students: 7,120 (2011)
- Address: Ciudad Universitaria, Buenos Aires, Argentina; 34.5409°S 58.44342°W
- Website: exactas.uba.ar
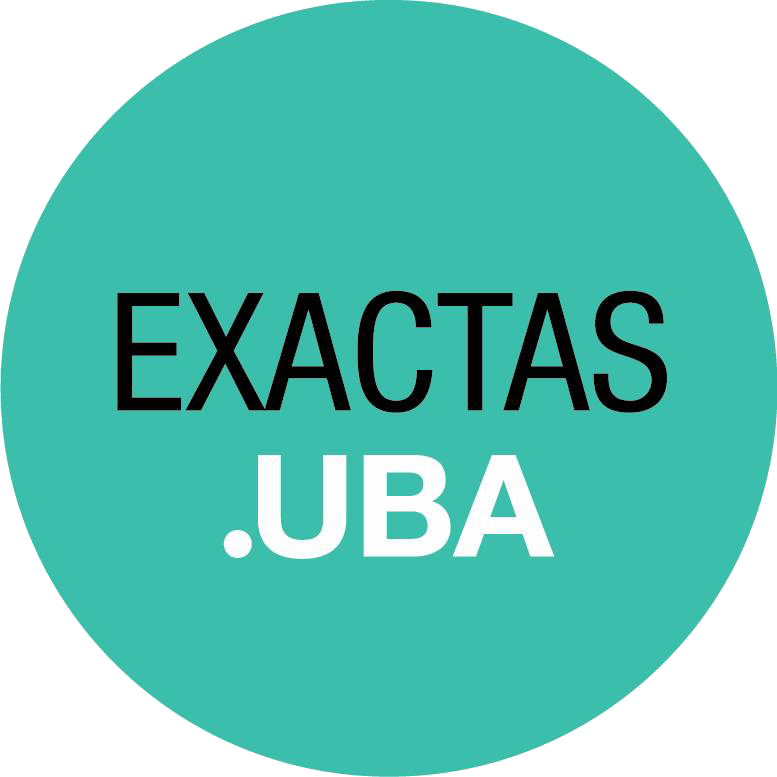

The Faculty of Exact and Natural Sciences (Facultad de Ciencias Exactas y Naturales; FCEN), commonly and informally known as Exactas, is the natural science school of the University of Buenos Aires, the largest university in Argentina.

It occupies several buildings of the Ciudad Universitaria complex in the Núñez neighbourhood of Buenos Aires. The computer science, mathematics and physics departments occupy the Pabellón 1, while the other departments are located at the Pabellón 2. Other building at the complex are also used for its academical and research activities such as the Pabellón de Industrias with the Faculty of Engineering or are wholly dedicated to research institutes operated in conjunction with Argentina's national research council CONICET (see list below).

== Academic departments ==
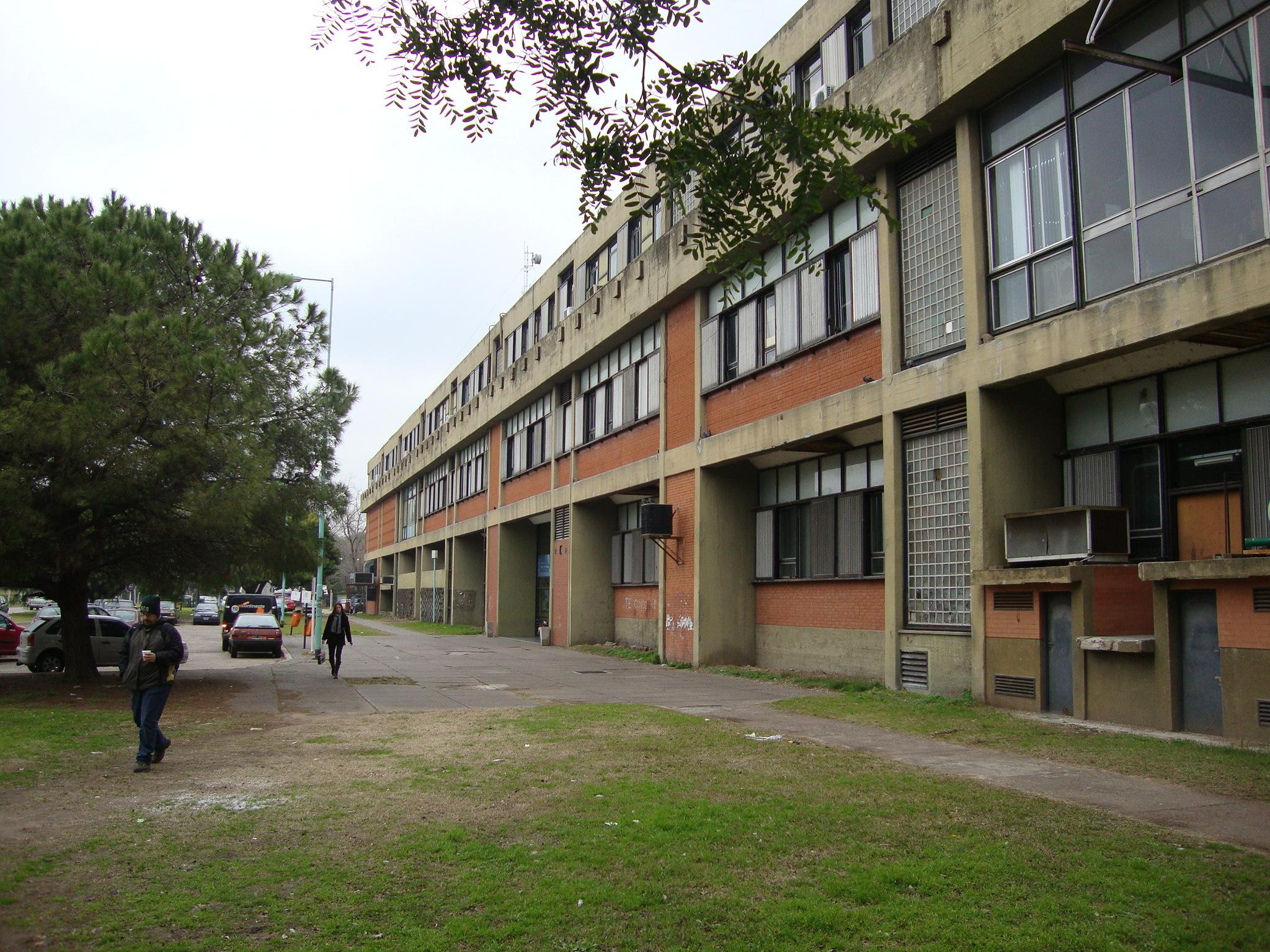
Pabellón 1 as of 2010

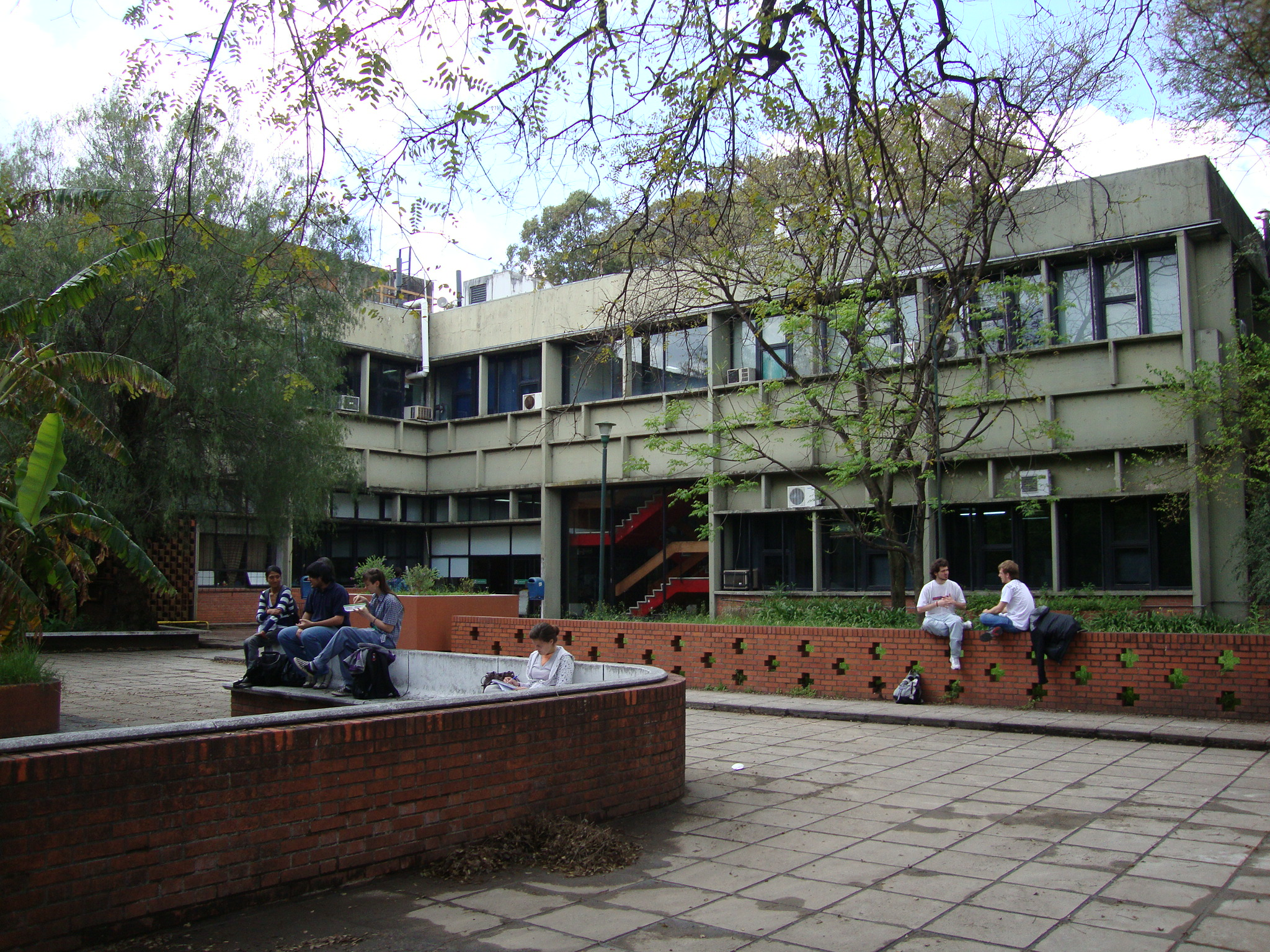
Pabellón de Industrias in 2010

- Department of Atmospheric and Ocean Sciences
- Department of Computer Science
- Department of Physics
- Department of Geology
- Department of Mathematics
- Department of Biological Chemistry
- Department of Inorganic, Analytic and Physical Chemistry
- Department of Organic Chemistry
- Department of Physiology, Molecular and Cellular Biology
- Department of Ecology, Genetics and Evolution
- Department of Biodiversity and Experimental Biology
- Department of Industries
- Institute of Biochemical Investigations

=== Other academic units ===
- CEFIEC
- Institute of Calculus (IC)

=== UBA-CONICET Institutes ===
- Institute of Space Astronomy and Physics (IAFE)
- Centre of Investigations of the Sea and Atmosphere (CIMA)
- Centre of Investigations of Carbohydrates (CIHIDECAR)
- Institute of Physical-Chemistry of Materials, Environment and Energy (INQUIMAE)
- Institute of Physiology, Molecular Biology and Neuro-Sciences (IFIBYNE)
- Institute of Physics of Plasma (INFIP)
- Institute of Geochronology and Isotropic Geology (INGEIS)
- Microanalysis and Physical Methods Unit in Organic Chemistry (UMYMFOR)
- Institute of Computer Science

=== CONICET associated ===
- Institute of Genetic Engineering and Molecular Biology (INGEBI)

== Master degrees ==
- Atmospheric Sciences
- Oceanography
- Biological Sciences

This Master´s degree Programme consists of three stages: 1) the Common Basic Cycle (CBC), as required for all careers at the University of Buenos Aires, 2) the Basic Professional Cycle of Biological Sciences (CPB) and 3) the Superior Professional Cycle (CPS). The CPB, which comprises 13 subjects, concentrates all the scientist's basic training. The CPS consists of 10 subjects (or 9 subjects and a bachelor's thesis) and is carried out in the orientation chosen by the student. Different from the CPB, the CPS curriculum is not rigid, but each student must agree on a study plan under the guidance of a teacher (Study Plan´s Tutor). The subjects of the complete Study plan and the corresponding requirement of study hours can be found here "Plan de Estudio":

- Computer Sciences
- Physical Sciences
- Geological Sciences
- Mathematical Sciences
- Chemical Sciences
- Paleontology

== Postgraduate degrees ==
The School also offers Masters of Science and Ph.D. degrees.

== See also ==
- Science and technology in Argentina
- List of universities in Argentina
