= Sáenz =

Sáenz or Saenz may refer to:

== People ==
- Aarón Sáenz Garza (1891–1983), Mexican politician
- Antonio Fernandez Saenz (born 1947), Spanish-Brazilian lawyer and human rights defender
- Antonio Sáenz (1780–1825), Argentine statesman, educator and cleric
- Blas Antonio Sáenz (1800–unknown), Nicaraguan politician
- Carlos Enrique Díaz Sáenz Valiente (1917–1956), Argentine Olympic sport shooter
- Francine Carrel Saenz Diaz (born 2004), Filipina actress and model
- Diana Sáenz (born 1989), Costa Rican footballer
- Eddie Saenz (1923–1971) American football player for the Washington Redskins of the National Football League
- Francisco Javier Sáenz de Oiza (1918–2000), Spanish architect
- Frankie Saenz (born 1980), American Ultimate Fighting Championship mixed martial artist
- Jaime Sáenz (1921–1986), Bolivian poet, novelist, and short story writer
- Joaquín Sáenz y Arriaga (1899–1976), Mexican Catholic priest and theologian
- Joe Saenz (born 1975), gangster and former fugitive
- Kimberly Clark Saenz (born 1973), American serial killer and former licensed practical nurse
- Luis Sáenz Peña (1822–1907), president of Argentina 1892–1895
- Manuela Sáenz (1797–1856), revolutionary hero of South America
- Moisés Sáenz (1888–1941), education advocate and reformer of education in Mexico
- Olmedo Sáenz (born 1970), Major League Baseball player
- Pedro Rubiano Sáenz (born 1932), Roman Catholic Archbishop of Bogotá
- Pedro Segura y Sáenz (1880–1957), Spanish Cardinal and Archbishop
- Ralph Saenz (a.k.a. Michael Starr; born 1965) American singer, songwriter, and musician of the comedic glam metal band Steel Panther
- Roque Sáenz Peña (1851–1914), president of Argentina 1910–1914
- Roy Sáenz (born 1944), retired Costa Rican football player
- Soraya Sáenz de Santamaría (born 1971), Spanish politician
- Stephen Sáenz (born 1990), American-born Mexican athlete
- Suso (Jesús Fernández Sáenz de la Torre) (born 1993), Spanish football player
- Waldir Sáenz (born 1973), retired Peruvian footballer

== Other uses ==
- Sáenz (Buenos Aires Underground), a station planned for 2018
- Saenz v. Roe, a U.S. Supreme Court case relating to travel between U.S. states

== See also ==
- Avenida Roque Sáenz Peña, a main road in the San Nicolás quarter of Buenos Aires, Argentina
- Sáenz Peña (disambiguation)
- Saens (disambiguation)
