= Roque Sáenz Peña (disambiguation) =

Roque Sáenz Peña was an Argentine politician; other uses might include:

- Roque Sáenz Peña Hospital, in Rosario
- Presidencia Roque Sáenz Peña, a city in Chaco Province
- President Roque Sáenz Peña Avenue, a main street in the San Nicolás quarter of Buenos Aires, Argentina
- Presidente Roque Sáenz Peña, a suburb of Buenos Aires
- Presidente Roque Sáenz Peña Department, a department of Córdoba Province in Argentina
- Pres. Roque Saenz Pena, an airport in Argentina (PRQ)
