= Sáenz Peña =

Sáenz Peña may refer to:

- Luis Sáenz Peña (1822-1907), former president of Argentina (1892–1895)
- Roque Sáenz Peña (1851-1914), former president of Argentina (1910–1914)
- Presidencia Roque Sáenz Peña, Chaco Province, Argentina
- Sáenz Peña, Buenos Aires Province, Argentina
- Sáenz Peña (Buenos Aires Metro), a station
- Sáenz Peña Law, which reformed electoral law in Argentina (1912)

== See also ==
- Roque Sáenz Peña (disambiguation)
- Peña (disambiguation)
- Sáenz (disambiguation)
