= Plaza de la República (Buenos Aires) =

Buenos Aires place in Argentina

Coordinates: 34.6037°S 58.3815°W

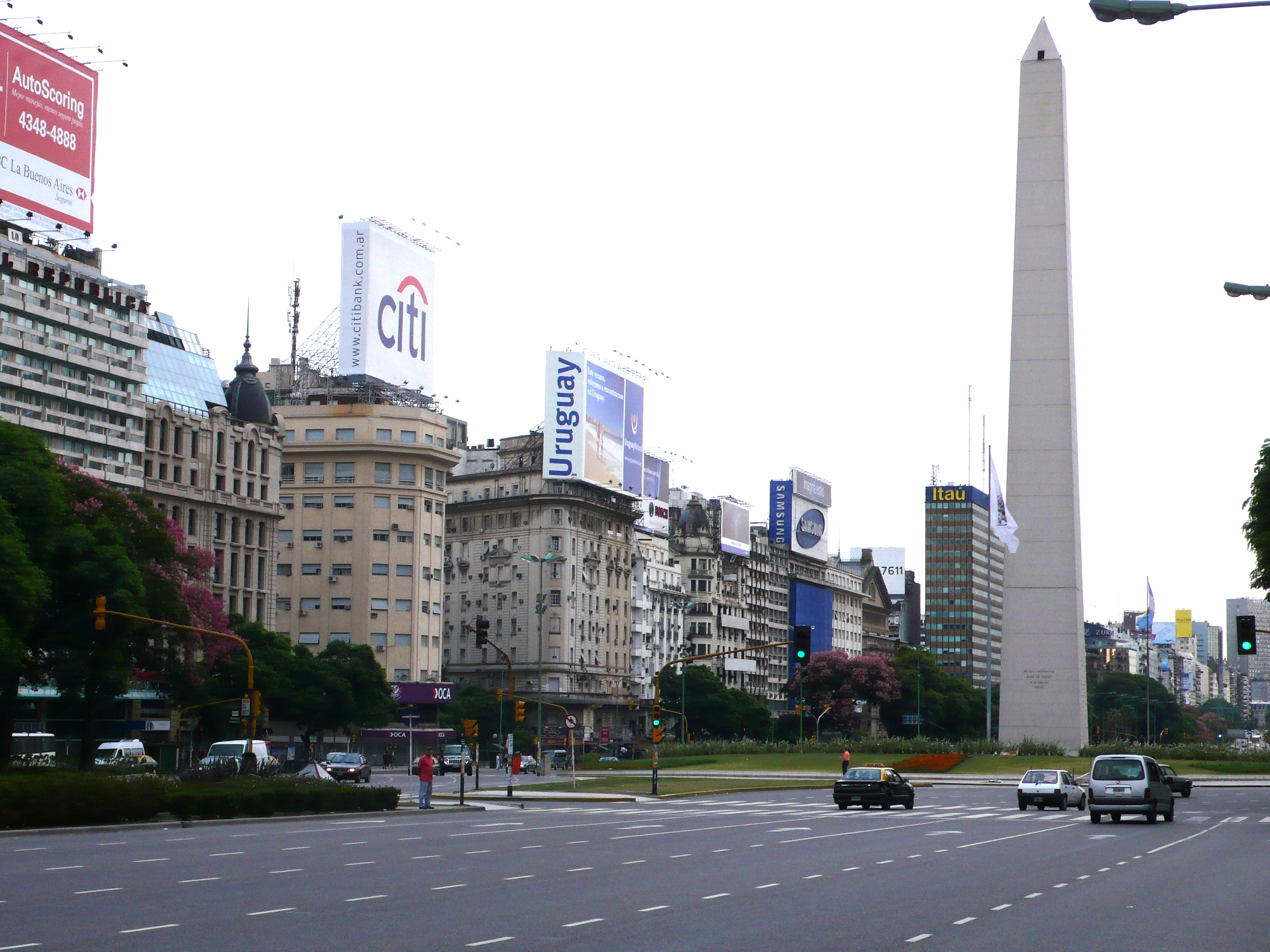
An eye-level view of the Plaza de la República from the south

Plaza de la República (Republic Square) is a city square in Buenos Aires, capital of Argentina. It is located in the San Nicolás quarter, at the intersection of the city's three main arteries: Ninth of July Avenue, Corrientes Avenue, and Diagonal Norte. It derives its name and associations from a church once sited on the square, San Nicolás de Bari (demolished in the 1930s for the creation of 9 July Avenue), where the country's national flag was hoisted for the first time.

The plaza is the site of the Obelisk of Buenos Aires, designed by Alberto Prebisch and inaugurated in 1937. The plaza, originally a circular esplanade paved in stone, was enlarged to its current dimensions in 1962. Its present layout was established in 1971, when Corrientes Avenue was rerouted through the plaza and around the obelisk to ease car traffic into the city's financial district.

== Metro ==
Three lines of the Buenos Aires Metro have connecting stations underneath the plaza, and are accessible from either side of the Ninth of July Avenue. These are:

- "Carlos Pellegrini" station on the Line
- "9 de Julio" station on the Line
- "Diagonal Norte" station on the Line

Together they offer an easy route around most of the important places in the capital.
