= Avenida 9 de Julio =

Thoroughfare in Buenos Aires, Argentina

Coordinates: 34°36′28″S 58°22′53″W

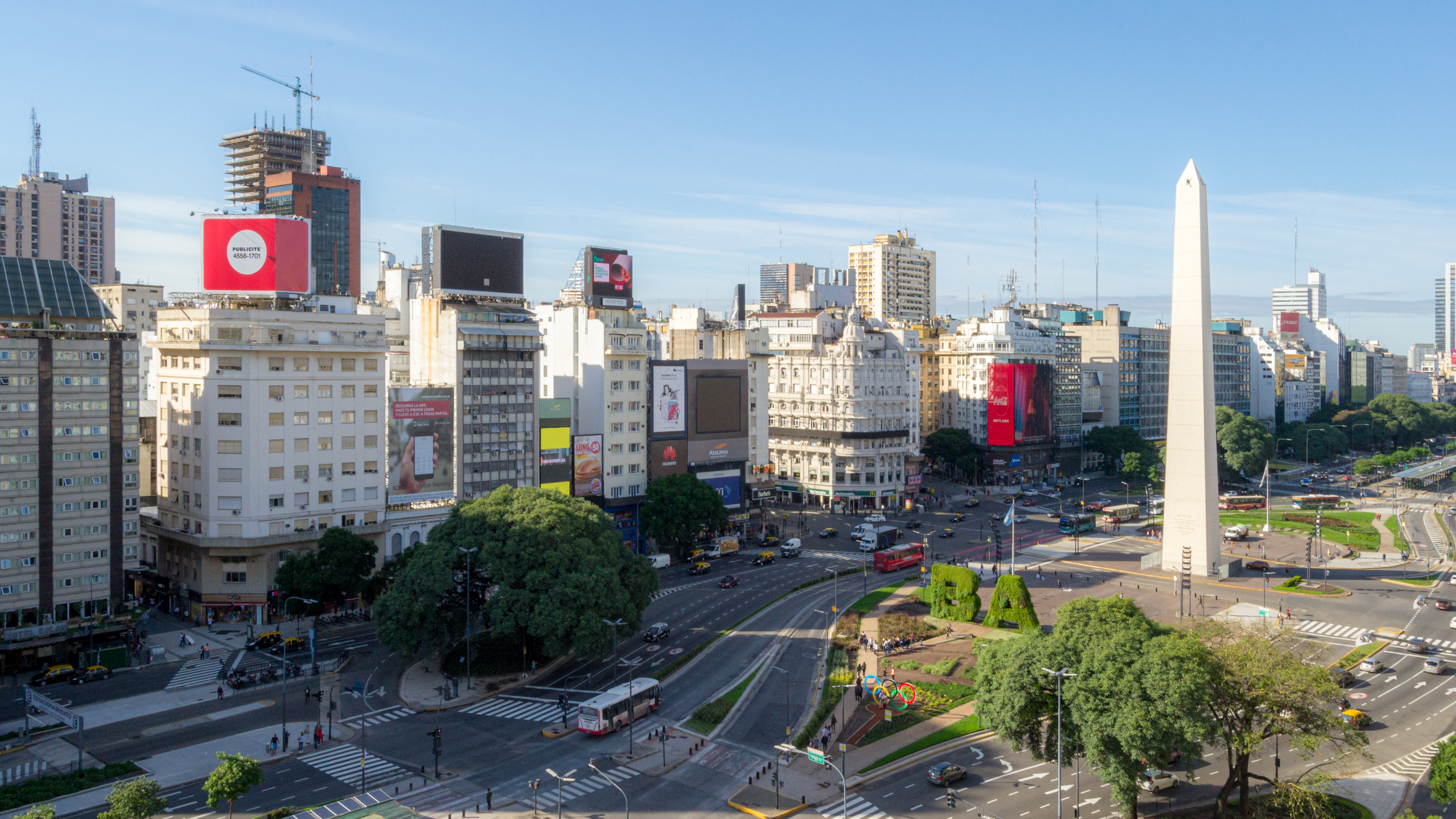
- View to the south, with the Obelisco
- Interactive map of Avenida 9 de Julio
- Type: Avenue
- Length: 3.4 km (2.1 mi)
- Location: Buenos Aires, Argentina
- South end: San Juan Avenue
- North end: Arroyo Street

Avenida 9 de Julio (English: July 9 Avenue) is a major thoroughfare in the city centre of Buenos Aires, Argentina. Its name honors Argentina's Independence Day, July 9, 1816.

The avenue runs around 3 kilometres (1.9 mi) to the west of the Río de la Plata waterfront, from the Retiro district in the north to Constitución station in the south. The avenue has up to seven lanes in each direction and is flanked on either side by parallel streets of three to four lanes each. Through the centre of the avenue runs one of the city's Metrobus (Bus rapid transit) corridors, which stretches 3 kilometres (1.9 mi) and was inaugurated in July 2013. There are two wide medians between the side streets and the main road. At a width of 110 metres (360 ft), it is currently the widest avenue in the world.

The northern end of the avenue is connected to the Arturo Illia expressway (which connects to Jorge Newbery airport and the Pan-American highway) and to Libertador avenue. The southern end is connected to the 25 de Mayo tollway (serving the west side of Greater Buenos Aires as well as Ezeiza airport) and the 9 de Julio elevated expressway which provides access to the two main southbound roads out of the city (route 1 to La Plata and route 2 to Mar del Plata). The Republic Square is located on the intersection of this Avenue with the Corrientes Avenue and on that point is sited the Obelisk of Buenos Aires.

== History and overview ==
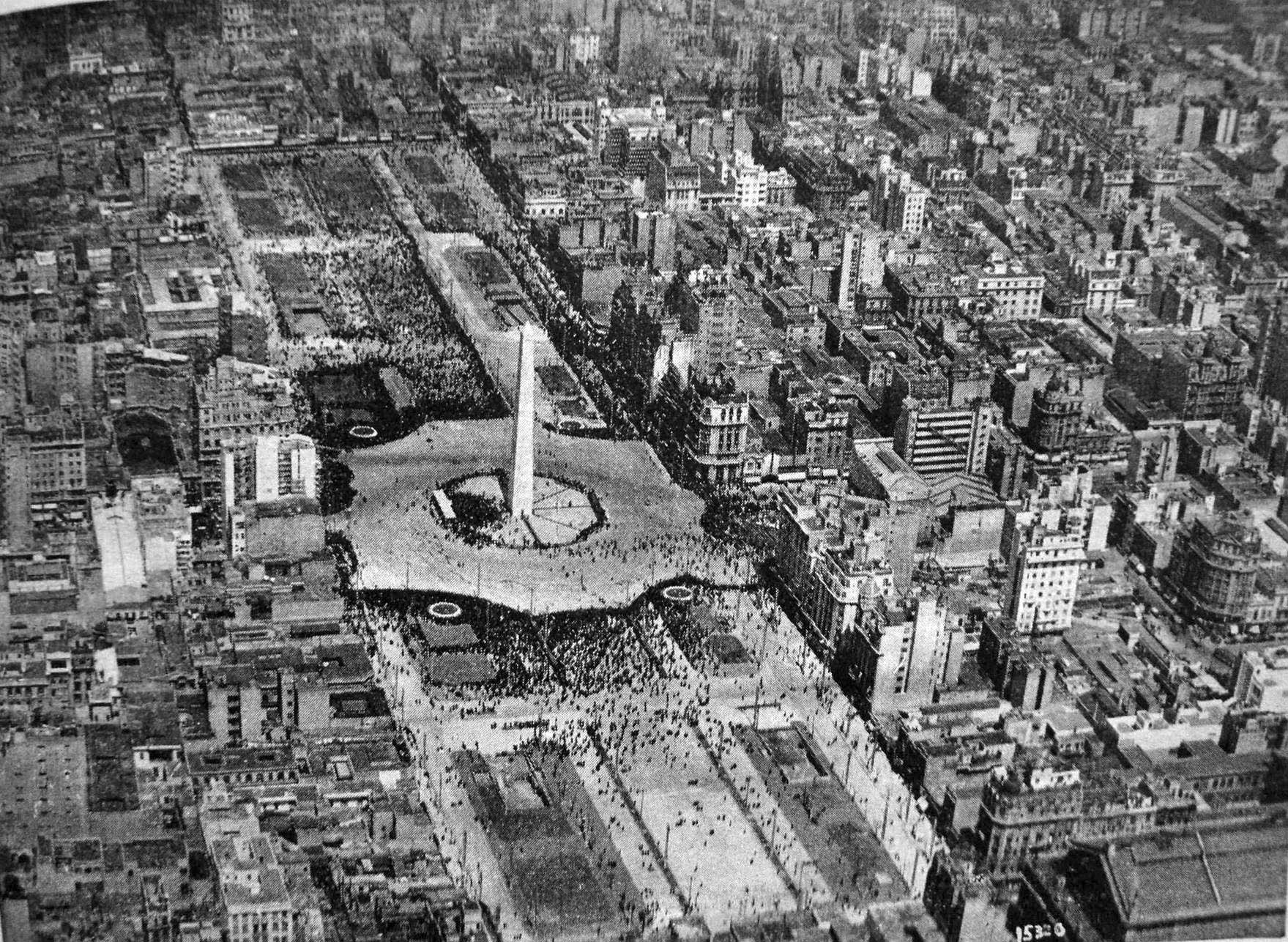
The avenue and obelisk on their 1937 inaugural

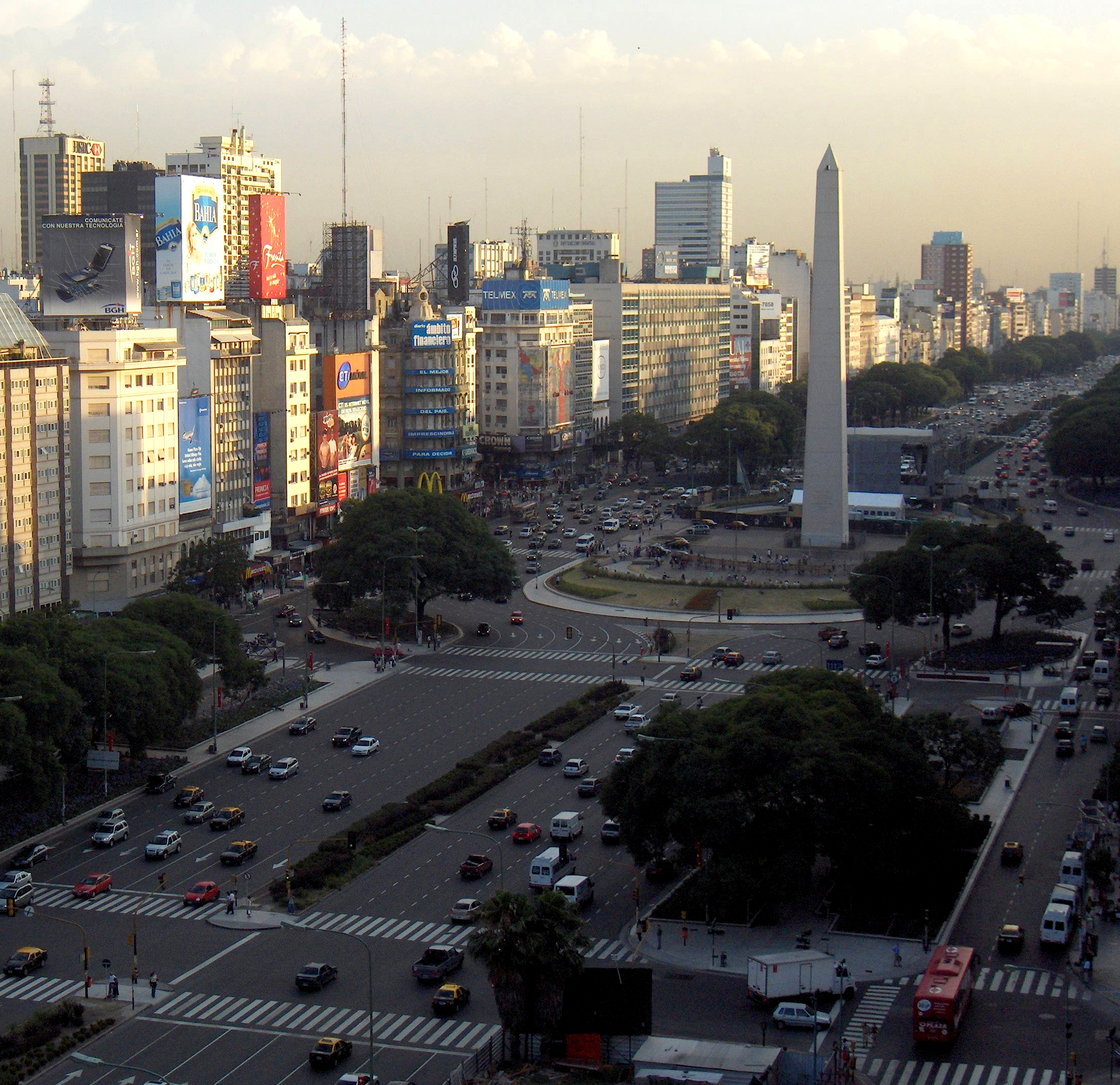
The avenue in 2007

The idea of constructing July 9 Avenue (La Avenida 9 de Julio) was proposed during the time of Mayor Francisco Seeber (1889–1890). It was hoped to be like an artery that crossed through from the north to the south, connecting the two. Later it was included in diverse plans and projects, but it was not until 1912 that it passed the National Law 8.855 that authorized the municipality to carry it out. It was intended for public use within the blocks between the streets of Cerrito and Lima and Carlos Pellegrini to Bernardo de Irigoyen, from the Paseo de Julio (Avenida del Libertador) to Brazil (Barrio de Constitución) with the goal of constructing a 33-meter-wide central avenue, flanked with two wide streets and by public or private buildings of characterized style and special architecture built on the resulting land. The sale would be part of the financial funds along with the loan issued by the local government of 25 million gold pesos. This money would come directly from the income of the local government and with a 10% of direct contribution from the nation. If the central part corresponded well with the north–south axis, the project would complement the streets running from east to west and having two round-abouts: one located at the intersection of May Avenue (Avenida de Mayo) and the other at the intersection of Corrientes (Corrientes Avenue).

As soon as the respective law was sanctioned, Mayor Anchorena made a step toward completion by inaugurating it for the Centennial of Independence (1916). The Municipality of the city of Buenos Aires started the acquisition of all the properties located particular track with an investment of 50,000,000 of the currency of that time (peso moneda nacional). However, the municipality was not well-equipped enough with legal instruments and sufficient finances in order to further the ventures of construction of such a size in a sustainable and orderly way. The expropriations were carried out in a gradual and alternated way, such that it was slow in completing the tasks at hand. This created a grave burden on the municipal treasury. This setback also had negative effects on the building developments in the central zone. With this, many buildings were degraded and were either abandoned or demolished. The matter generated a political and financial crisis of large proportions, which were also aggravated by the outbreak of the Great War and the proximity of the first democratic elections that were to occur with the resignation of Mayor Anchorena and with the closing of the Municipal Counsel in 1915.

The idea to construct the July 9 Avenue was maintained in the plan of 1925 where it was integrated into the North and South diagonals (proposed in 1919), forming at the ends two central monuments.

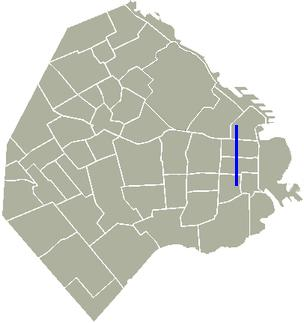
9 de Julio in Buenos Aires

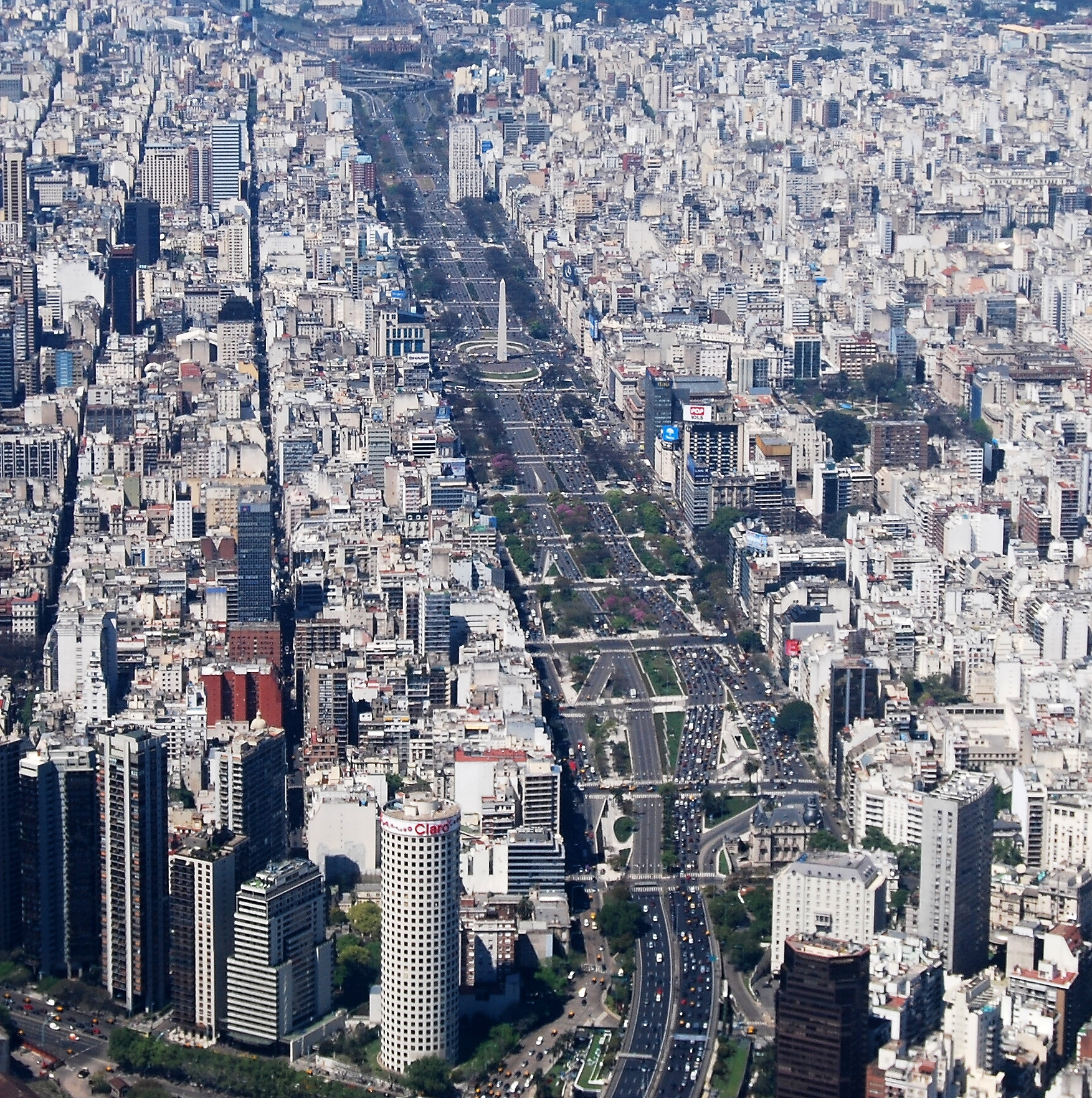
Aerial view of the avenue

The avenue's unusual width is because it spans an entire city block, the distance between two streets in the checkerboard pattern used in Buenos Aires. The distance between adjacent streets is roughly 110 m, greater than the distance between streets in Manhattan. The street flanking 9 de Julio to the east is called Carlos Pellegrini (north of Rivadavia) and Bernardo de Irigoyen (south of Rivadavia). The street flanking 9 de Julio to the west is called Cerrito (north of Rivadavia) and Lima (south of Rivadavia).

The avenue was first planned in 1888, with the name of Ayohuma; but the road was long opposed by affected landlords and residents, so work did not start until 1935. The initial phase was inaugurated on October 12, 1937 and the main stretch of the avenue was completed in the 1960s. The southern connections were completed after 1980, when the downtown portion of the tollway system was completed. Clearing the right-of-way for these intersections required massive condemnations in the Constitución area.

Line C of the Buenos Aires Metro runs for a stretch under the avenue. Line A, Line B, Line D, and Line E have stations when their course intersects the avenue. Notably, lines B, C, and D share a station underneath the Obelisk, which is the focal point of the subway system and features a retail concourse which also serves as an underpass. The respective station names are Carlos Pellegrini, Diagonal Norte, and 9 de Julio.

Crossing the avenue at street level often requires a few minutes, as all intersections have traffic lights. Under normal walking speed, it takes pedestrians normally two to three green lights to cross it. Some urban planners have submitted projects to move the central part of the avenue underground to alleviate the perceived "chasm" between the two sides of the avenue.

== MetroBus Line ==
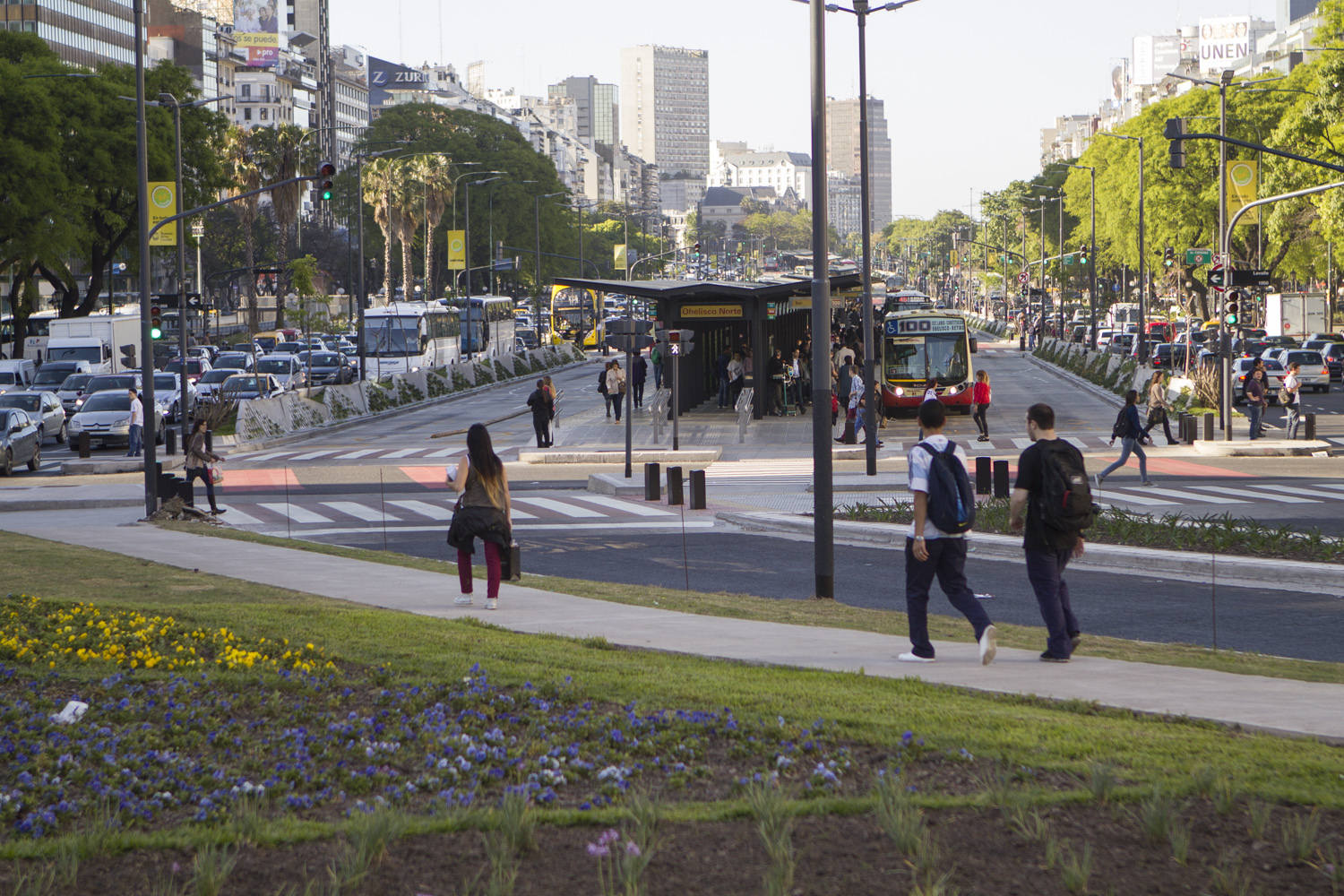
9 de Julio station

The Metrobus 9 de Julio is 3 kilometres (1.9 mi) long with 13 stations and runs down the avenue, taking roughly the same route as Line C of the Buenos Aires Underground. It serves 11 bus lines and reduces bus travel time by 50% along the avenue. The main objective of this line is to join the city's two busiest railway stations: Retiro and Constitución and to serve the approximately 250,000 passengers per day which use buses along the avenue, with a journey time of 15 minutes instead of the 30 minutes a bus took before the line was built.

== Points of interest ==
The main landmarks along the avenue are, north to south:

- Palacio Ortiz Basualdo, headquarters of the French Embassy. The French government refused to submit the embassy building for demolition, and local preservationists opposed the move as well, as the building is widely hailed as an architectural masterpiece
- Teatro Colón
- The western end of Lavalle Street, a pedestrianized street formerly known for its many cinemas
- The Obelisk and Plaza de la República
- Statue of Don Quixote in the intersection with Avenida de Mayo
- The former Ministry of Public Works building (the only building sitting on the avenue itself, built immediately before the avenue), at the intersection with Moreno street, with large steel images of Eva Perón.
- Constitución station and Plaza Constitución

== Gallery ==
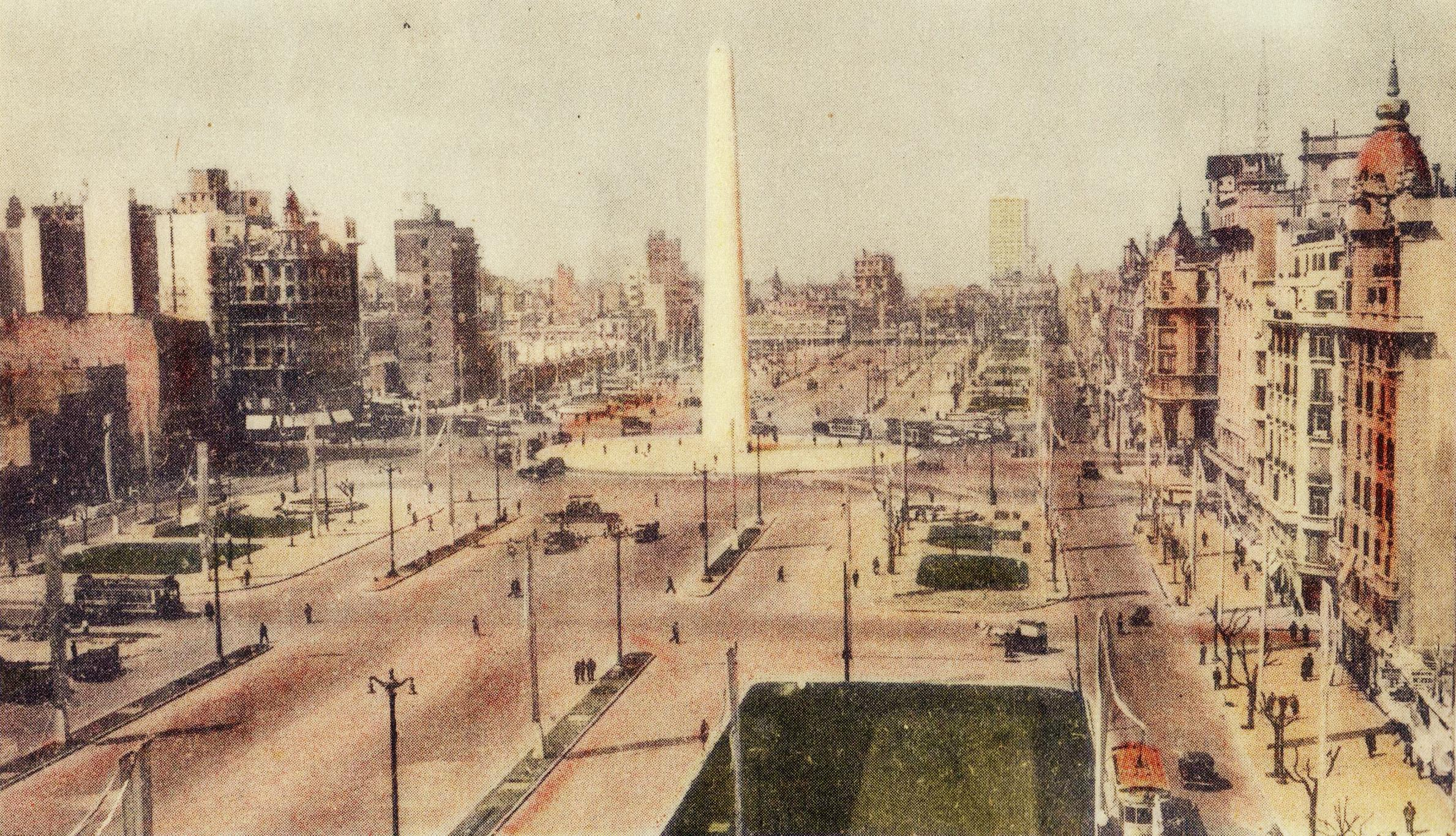
Panoramic view in the 1930s

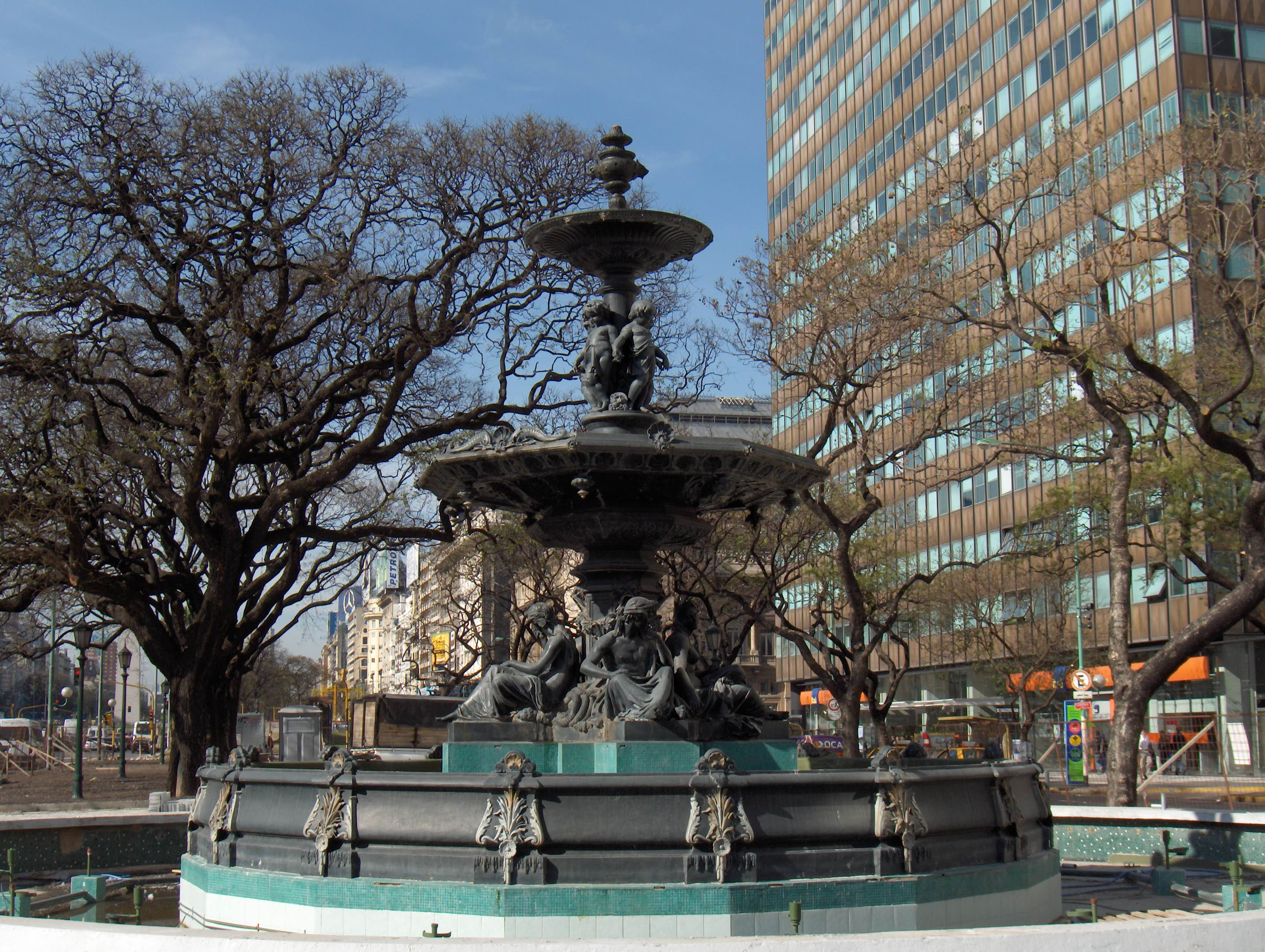
Fountain at the intersection with Cordoba Avenue. Behind it, the former headquarters of FIAT Argentina

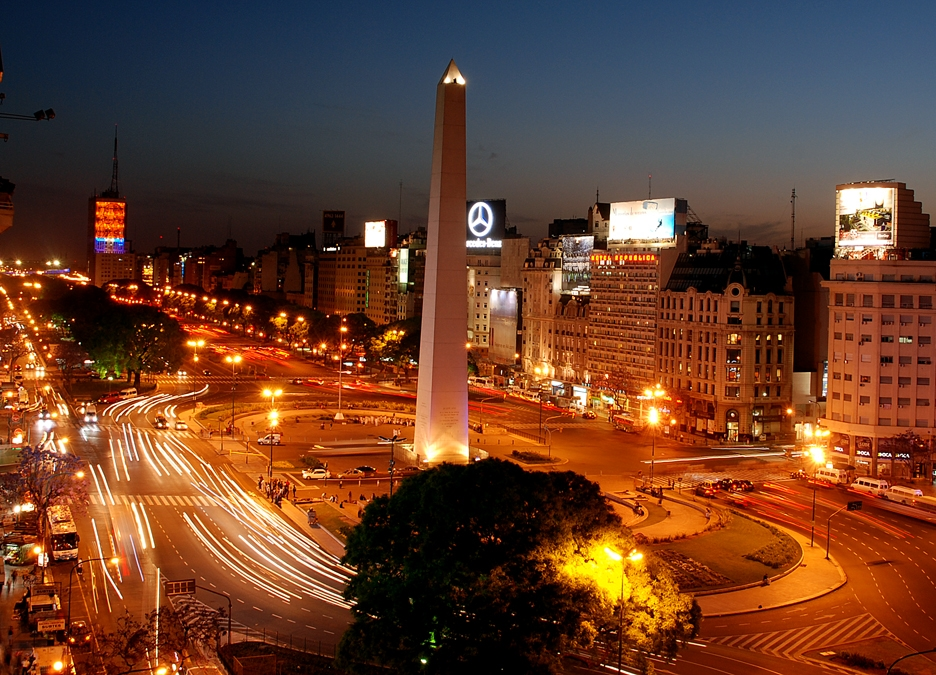
Avenida 9 de Julio at night

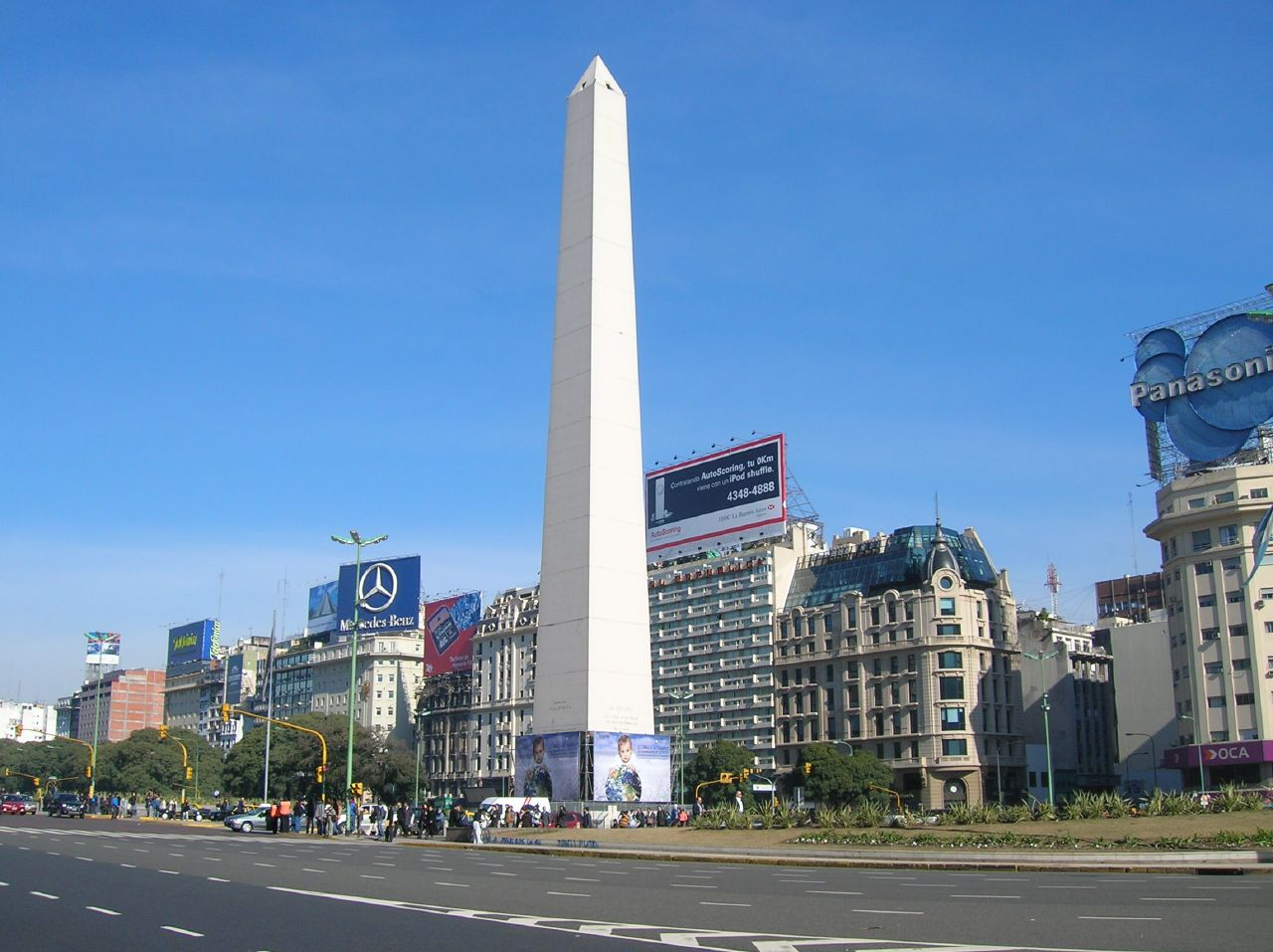
Avenida 9 de Julio and the obelisk
