= El Gato Negro (café) =

Coffeehouse in Buenos Aires

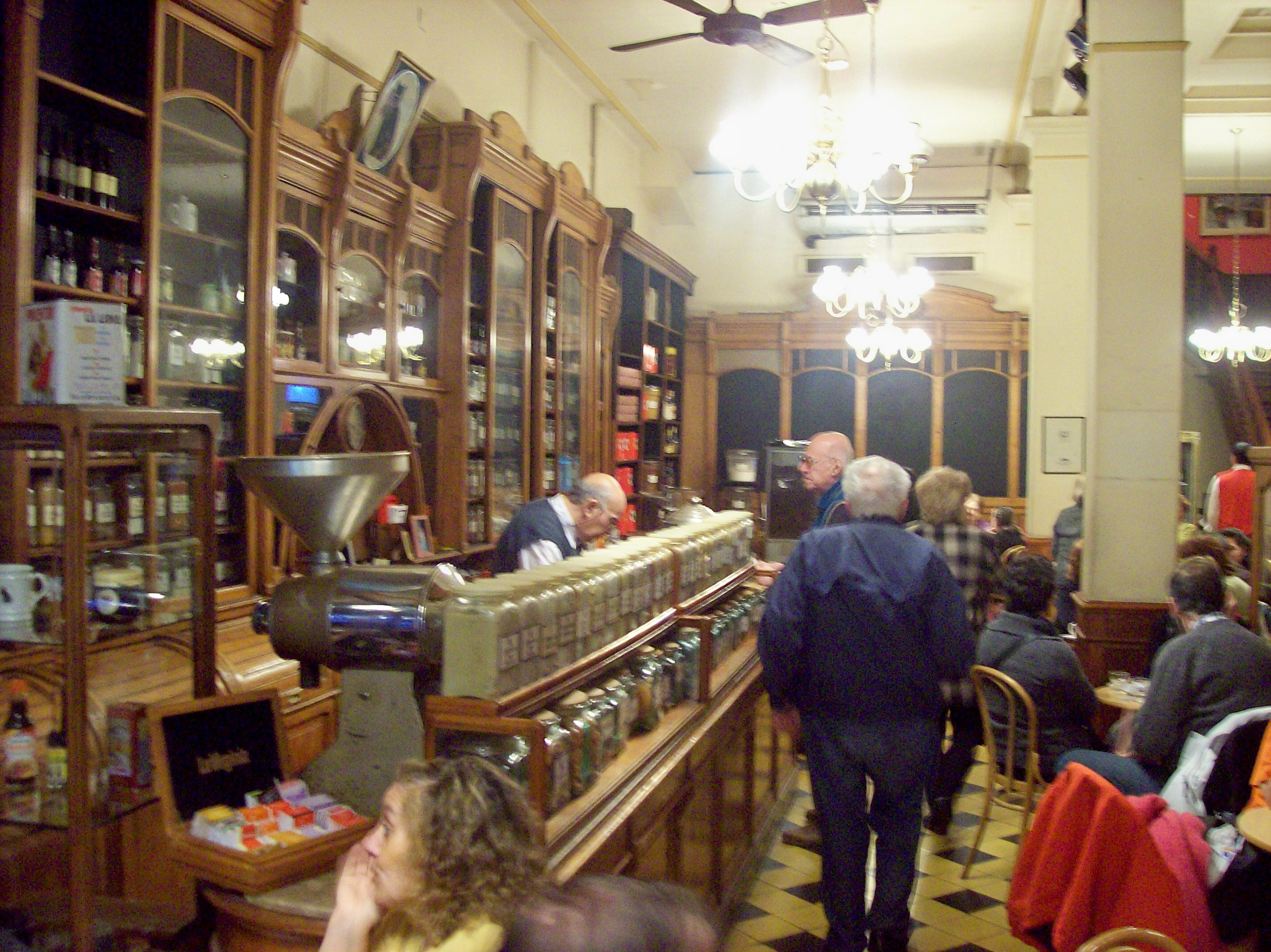
Interior of El Gato Negro

El Gato Negro is a coffeehouse located on Avenida Corrientes, Buenos Aires. It was founded by the Spanish immigrant Victoriano López Robredo in 1927 and is recognized as a historic landmark of the city by the Government of Buenos Aires. It sells a variety of teas, coffees and spices.

It is now owned by Robredo's grandson Jorge Crespo.

== History ==
The origin of the coffeehouse was the initiative of the Spanish immigrant and entrepreneur Victoriano López Robredo, who married an Argentine woman and decided to stay in the country. He then opened a spice shop named La Matinica at its first location on what was then the small Corrientes Street 1600. One year after the opening, he moved to the current location on what is now Corrientes Avenue.

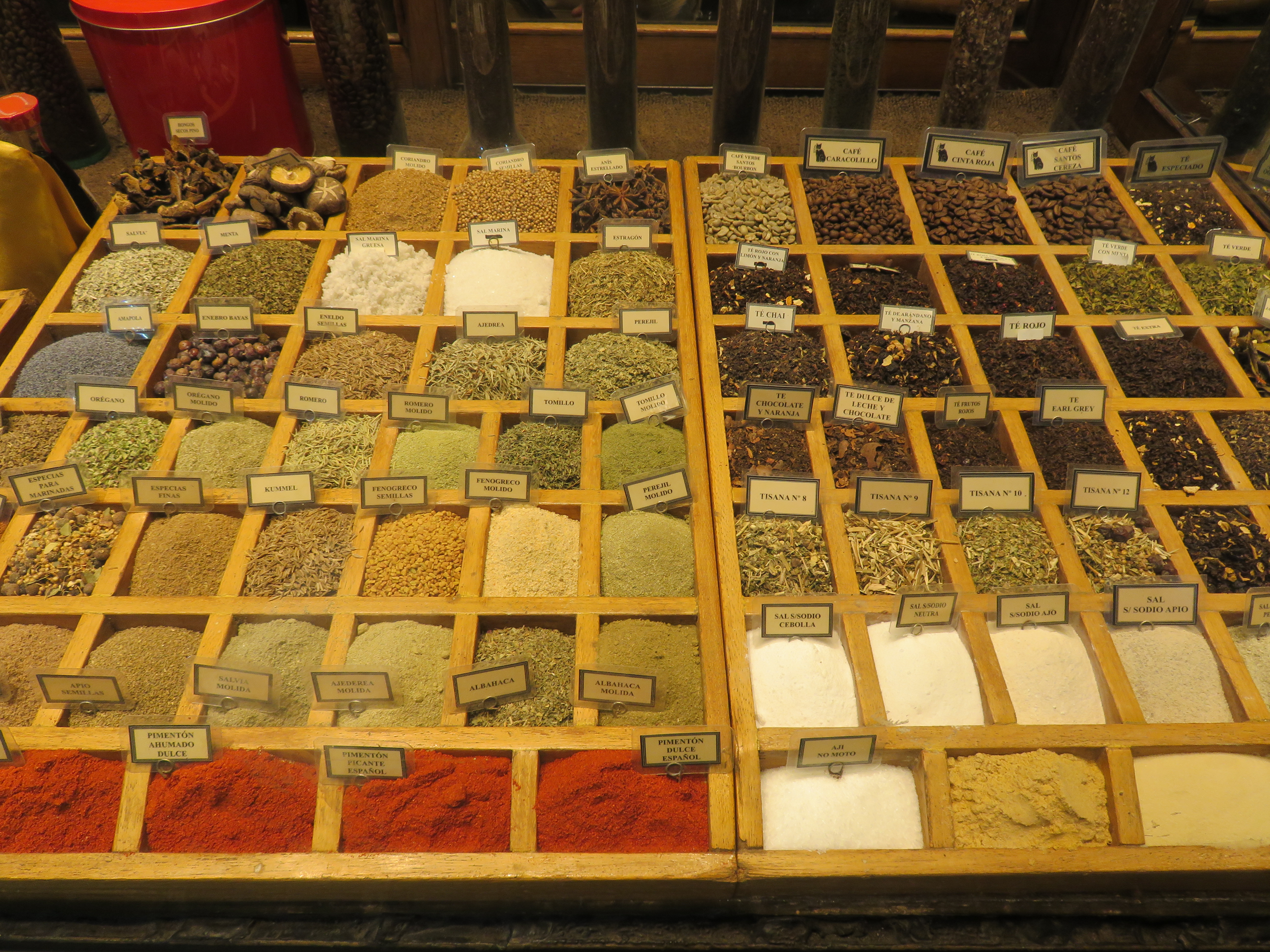
Spices on display at the bar

López lived for almost four decades in Asia, working for a British company in Ceylon, Singapore and the Philippines. According to his first employees, the name came from a famous coffeehouse in Madrid where the Spanish writer Jacinto Benavente used to be a regular client.

The main room displays spices, teas and coffees in showcases, as well as porcelain jars on oak shelves containing various ingredients. Tea and coffee are roasted to order at the bar, in order to preserve the aromas of the products. The furniture is composed of old circular tables with No. 14 chair Thonet chairs, and the lighting consists of Dutch-style chandeliers. The second floor is dedicated to signature dishes and is used for tango or jazz shows.
