= Avenida Corrientes =

Street in Buenos Aires, Argentina

Coordinates: 34.603978°S 58.386201°W

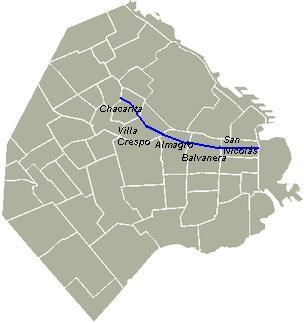
Location of Avenida Corrientes in Buenos Aires

Avenida Corrientes (English: Corrientes Avenue) is one of the principal thoroughfares of the Argentine capital of Buenos Aires. Over a central stretch it is popularly known as "The Street that Never Sleeps" ("La calle que nunca duerme") widely considered Buenos Aires' answer to Broadway as it concentrates many of the main theatres and cinemas as well as famous pizzerias and cafes, being intimately tied to the tango and the porteño sense of identity. Like the parallel avenues Santa Fe, Córdoba, and San Juan, it takes its name from one of the Provinces of Argentina.

It extends 69 blocks from Eduardo Madero Avenue in the eastern Puerto Madero neighborhood to the West and later to the Northwest and ends at Federico Lacroze Avenue in the Chacarita neighborhood. Automobile traffic runs from west to east. Line B of the Buenos Aires Metro runs most of its length underneath the street.

The Asociación Amigos de la Calle Corrientes ("Friends of Corrientes Street Association") is a group that collaborates on the urban planning of the street. They have placed commemorative plaques on 40 street corners bearing the distinguished figures from the history of the tango.

== History ==
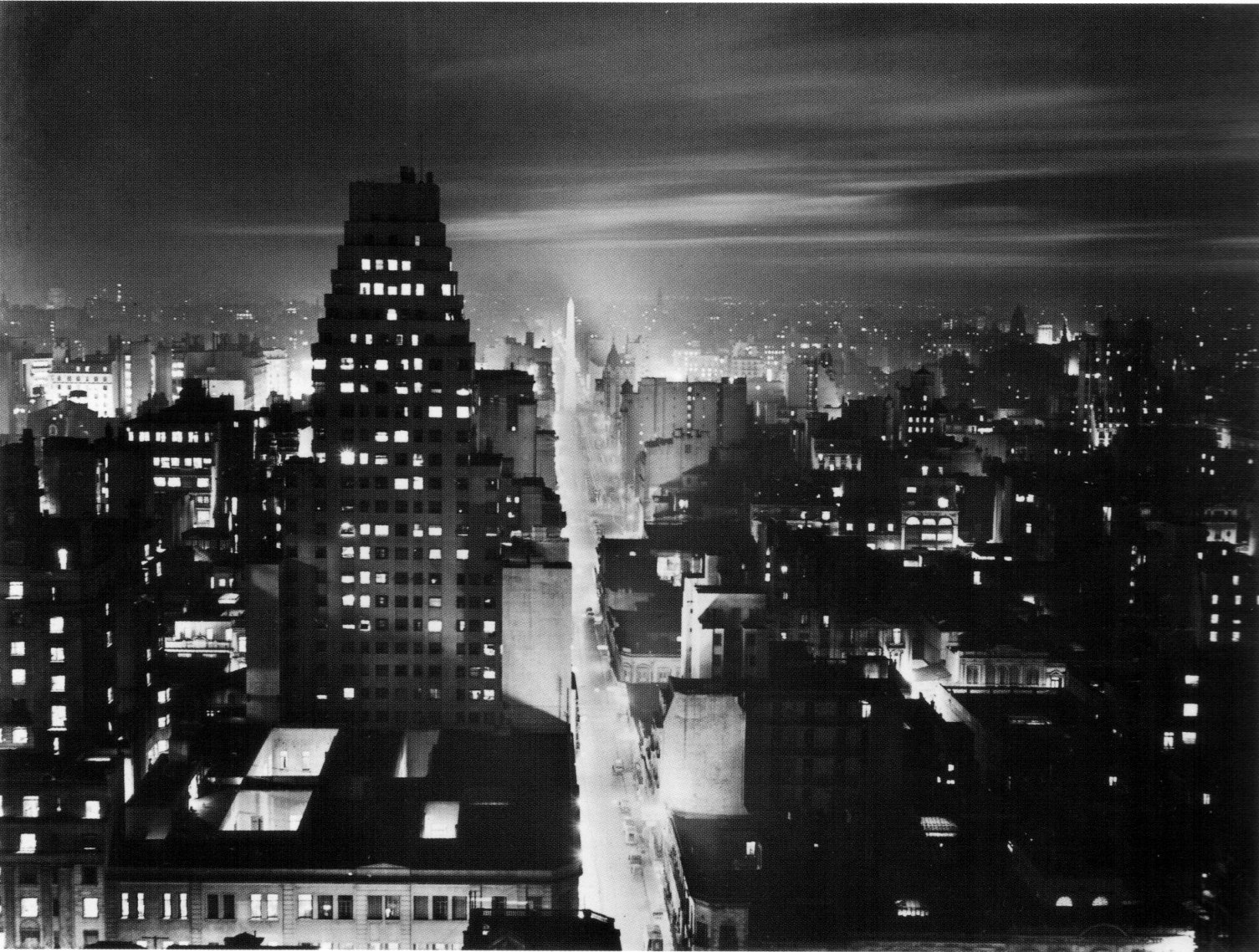
City lights along Corrientes Avenue shortly before its widening in the 1930s.

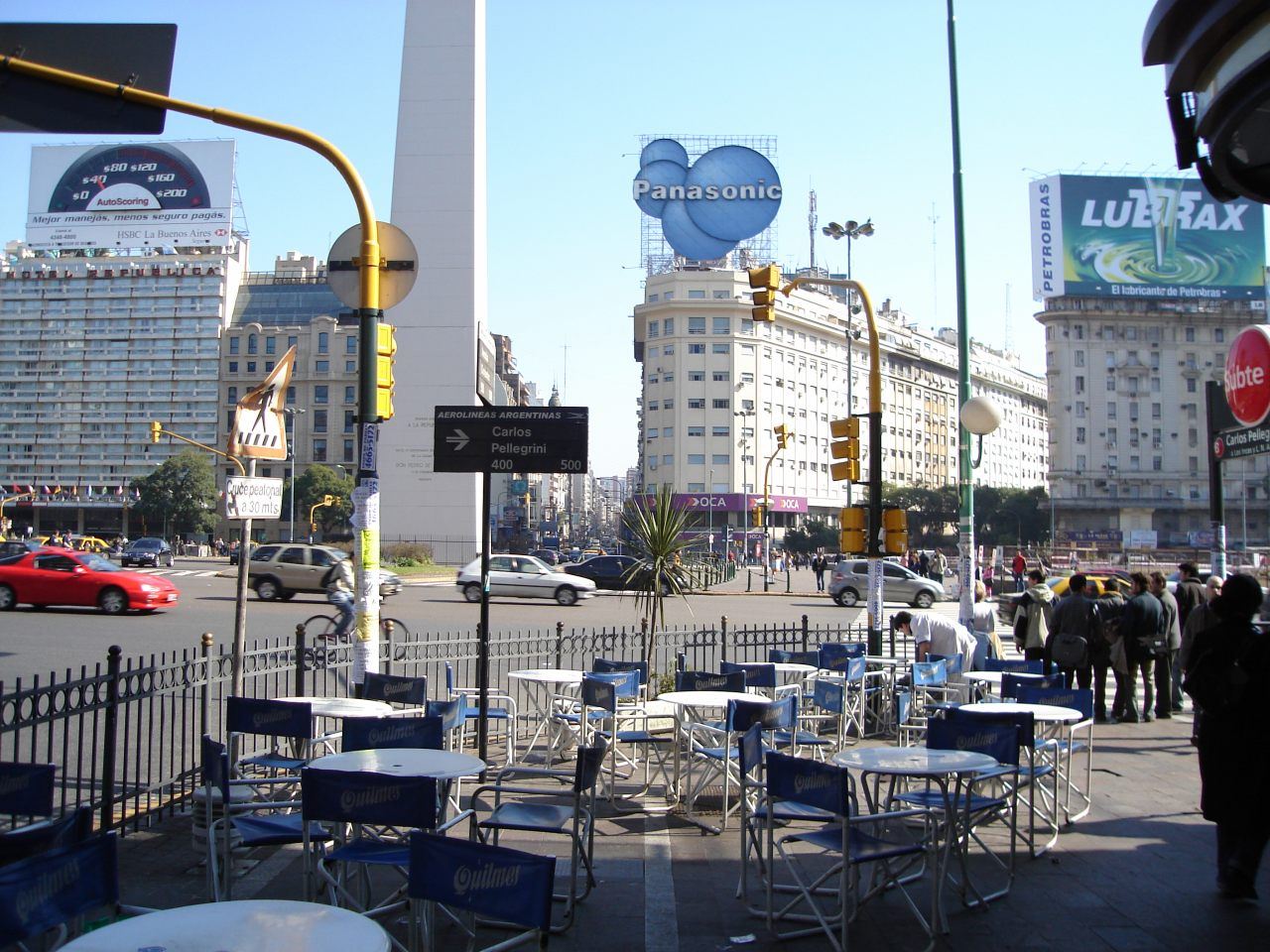
Intersection with Avenida 9 de Julio

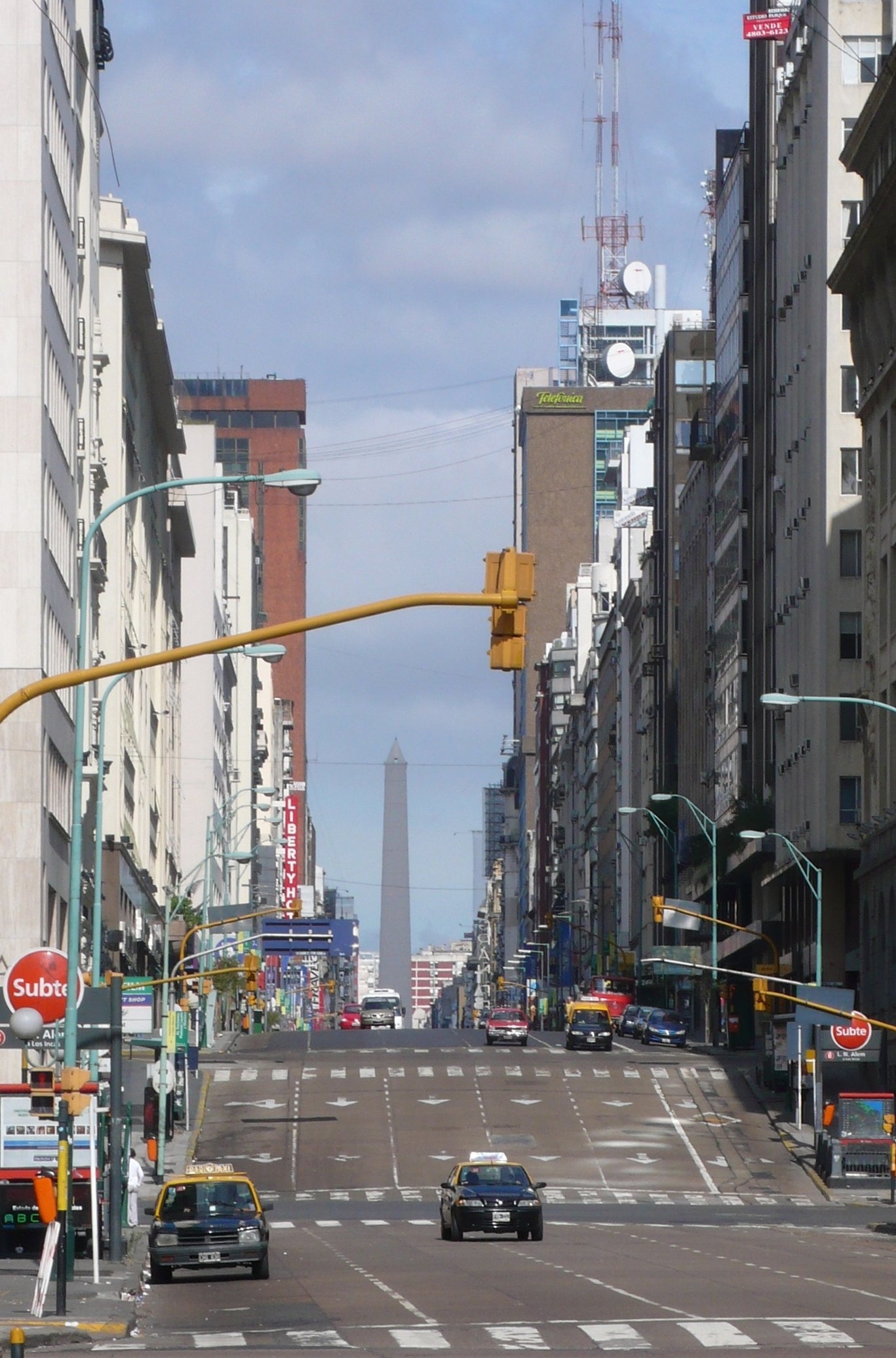
Corrientes Avenue viewed from "el bajo"

It was named Del Sol during the 17th century, San Nicolás from 1738 to 1808, and De Incháurregui from 1808 until 1822, when it received its current name. Never more than a street of average width during the nineteenth century, traffic swelled after the city began its rapid westward expansion, around 1880. Horse-drawn tramways first ran on the avenue in 1887; but, they soon proved inadequate and in 1910, Mayor Joaquín de Anchorena signed a bill authorizing its widening.

The plan called for the massive razing of most of the avenue's north-side real estate and, so, met with strenuous opposition from affected landlords, retailers, as well as intellectuals like Roberto Arlt. A coup d'ètat in 1930, however, made way for the plan's implementation, carried out relentlessly until its completion, in 1936. Today, when referring to Corrientes prior to the widening, the term "Narrow Corrientes" (Corrientes Angosta) is still used. Also the name "Corrientes Street" (calle Corrientes) is often preferred over the correct "Corrientes Avenue" (avenida Corrientes) specially on the famous centrical stretch (with that name it appears famously in several tango lyrics, see below).

The newly inaugurated avenue coincided with the construction of the Buenos Aires Obelisk, since then one of the city's most recognizable landmarks, visible for several blocks of the avenue's downtown stretch. The opening of the Obelisk and surrounding Plaza de la República in 1936 created a roundabout at the 9th of July Avenue intersection. Corrientes, like most major city avenues, was made a one-way thoroughfare by a 1967 municipal ordinance. Growing traffic demands led to the opening of the avenue through the plaza, and around the Obelisk, in 1971.

The first few blocks (from Leandro N. Alem to Florida Street) encompass Buenos Aires financial district ("La City") forming its Northern boundary, and are bustling with activity during banking hours – traversed after several blocks by pedestrian Florida St (which forms the district's Western boundary). Further down, for some blocks from 9 de Julio Avenue to Uruguay St the avenue forms the Southern border of the lawyers' district surrounding the nearby Plaza Lavalle and the Supreme Court (see "Points of Interest" below)

== Nightlife ==
For most of the 20th century "Calle Corrientes" was a symbol of nightlife in Buenos Aires, traditionally nicknamed "the street that never sleeps", In the 10 blocks West of downtown from Maipu St to Callao Avenue it still holds the largest concentration of theatres and cinemas (in the past together with nearby pedestrian calle Lavalle "La calle de los cines" or "Cinema street") making it the center of commercial theatre in the city and the country. Independent theatre in Buenos Aires for example is called "off Corrientes" (after off Broadway). The corridor includes some outstanding examples of Art Deco cinema architecture of the '30s and '40s such as Teatro Gran Rex, Teatro Opera and Teatro Premier. Also with the largest concentration of bookshops (many second hand),

Corrientes was during the day a favourite haunt for intellectuals during the '50s, '60s and '70s (specially at celebrated spots such as "Cafe La Paz") while its famous pizza parlours and restaurants (such as Los Inmortales and Güerrin) attracted city crowds on Fridays or Saturdays evenings – a night out of "pizza and cinema" (or of theatre going) on Corrientes and neighbouring Calle Lavalle being the standard form of urban weekend entertainment for generations of porteños (as reflected in lyrics such as "Moscato, pizza y fainá"). The Revista porteña or Teatro de revistas (Argentina's culture of theatre revues) with its glittering vedettes and racy capo-cómicos (legendary starlets and comedians) is still centered around this stretch of Corrientes – the lure of red carpet opening nights where celebrities can be glimpsed adding to the folklore. At its inception – the Luna Park is still synonymous with mass sports and entertainment events such as boxing matches or concerts.

Throughout the decades the street has seen its own fauna of urban stereotypes, from the "innocent barrio girl" corrupted by the "bright city lights" of many a tango lyric (cf. La costurerita que dio aquel mal paso "The Seamstress who Took the Wrong Turn") in the street's cabarets and nightclubs of the 1920s and '30s before its enlargement, to the '60s and '70s "valijeros" ('peeping toms') lone salesmen or office workers (thus nicknamed for their briefcases or valijas) who on lunch breaks sneaked to watch X-rated European movies when they started to appear at that time (visible also on neighbouring Lavalle St) to the '80s "psico-bolches", artsy students and intellectuals (typically leftist – bolchevique – and/or dabbling in psychology) who mulled around its bookstores and cultural centres after the return of democracy

The emergence of video, the Internet, cineplex and shopping malls reduced much of the allure of Corrientes, and saw the closing of several famous cinemas and theatres. Yet sidewalks were widened and beautified in 2005 to facilitate retail activity along the avenue, which had declined since the 1970s. and today Corrientes is once again thriving at night - specially among theatre goers, with several major playhouse renovations and additions. Since the '80s the trend towards world-famous Broadway musicals in Spanish coexists with the more traditional or avant-garde serious theatre and the popular Teatro de Revistas. The last blocks of this main stretch, between Avenida Callao and Uruguay Street are converted into an expansive outdoor reading room during Bookstore Night, an annual event inaugurated in 2007.

Mayor Mauricio Macri announced in 2010 that the financial district section of Corrientes - between Ninth of July and Avenida Leandro N. Alem, would become a two-way avenue.

== Points of interest ==
=== Base to obelisk ===
- Luna Park, former boxing ring, currently used for other sports and entertainment events
- The back of the Buenos Aires Central Post Office
- Comega Building
- The downtown microcentro banking district ("La City")
- Pedestrian Florida Street
- Teatro Gran Rex
- Teatro Opera
- Many of the country's most important theater companies.
- Numerous traditional and historical restaurants, including Argentine cuisine, Spanish cuisine and Italian cuisine.
- The Obelisk of Buenos Aires, at the intersection with 9 de Julio Avenue and the Plaza de la República.

=== "The street that never sleeps" ===
- Heladería Cadore ice cream shop.
- Los Inmortales pizzeria, previously the Café de los inmortales, ("Café of the immortals") with photos of the historic figures that visited it.
- Güerrín pizzeria
- Café La Paz, historic meeting place for leftist activists and intellectuals
- Bar Ramos
- La Giralda Cafeteria, serving Spanish-style hot chocolate and churros
- El Gato Negro, historic café known for its spices
- General San Martín Theater, state theater which concentrated modern drama and ballet during the later half of the 20th century (as opposed to the Colon Theatre)
- Teatro Broadway
- Paseo La Plaza, an urban oasis with theaters, retail stores and restaurants
- Hernández, Liberarte, and many other famous bookstores

=== Off-Corrientes ===
"Off-Corrientes" refers to the alternative playhouse scene, much of it literally concentrated on surrounding streets – although also widely distributed elsewhere in city neighbourhoods. The Rojas Cultural Center of the University of Buenos Aires, which promotes experimental art, and like-minded venues such as Gandhi and Liberarte (which blend bookstore and cultural centre) although catering to "off-Corrientes" crowds, are themselves located on Corrientes.

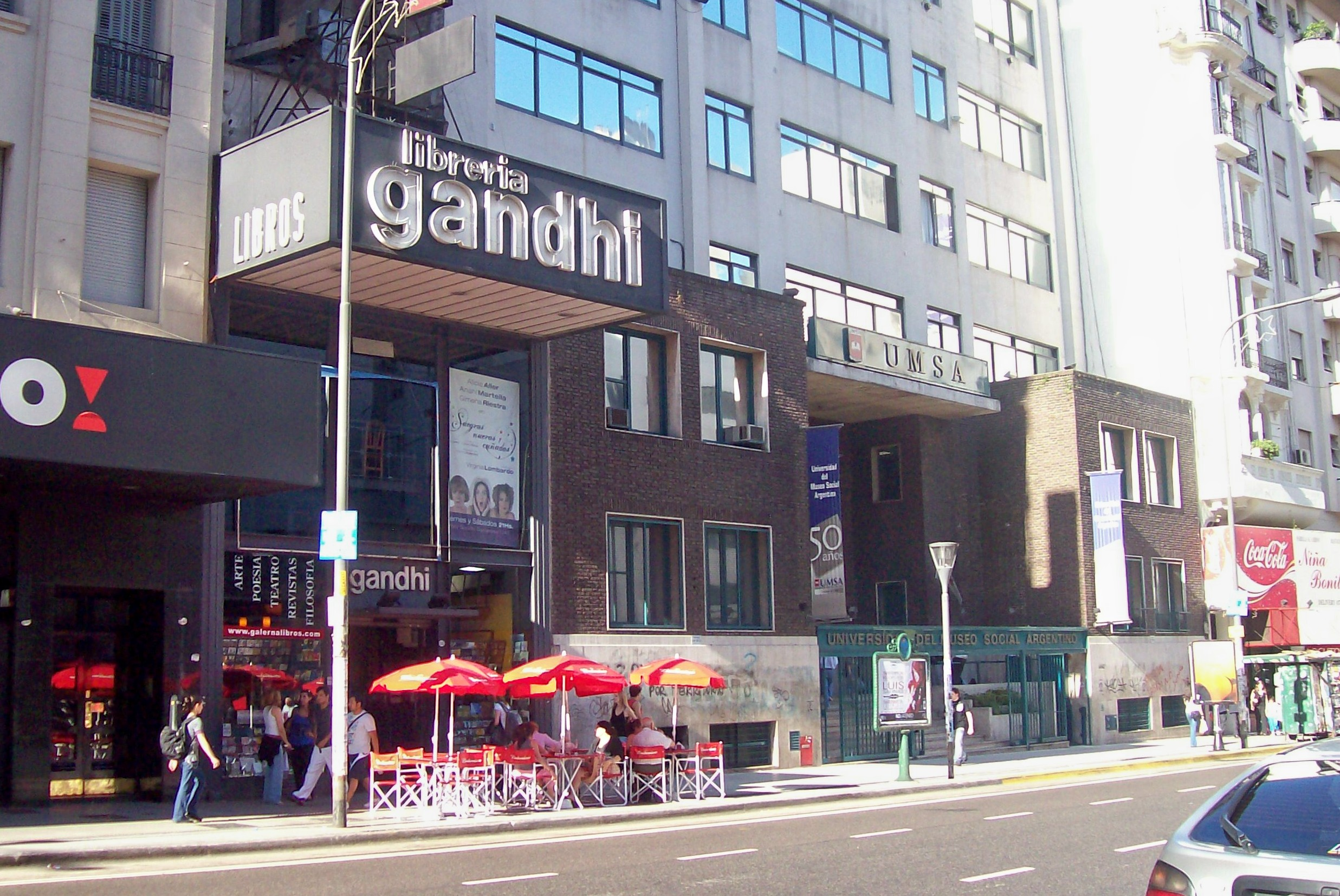
Gandhi Bookstore (now defunct). The avenue continues to be a book browser's mecca.

=== Once ===
Further down, Corrientes traverses the Balvanera borough (popularly known as Once) the traditionally Jewish neighborhood known for its many synagogues and the wholesale and retail sale of clothing (now home to merchants of other nationalities, including Koreans, Bolivians and Peruvians).

=== Abasto ===
Beyond Pueyrredón Avenue is the neighbourhood of Abasto, named thus for holding the once cavernous Art Deco Mercado de Abasto, the city's former central fruit and vegetable market (whose front faces Corrientes Avenue) and for being the home of Carlos Gardel, Argentina most famous tango singer – popularly known as "el morocho del Abasto" (the dark-haired from Abasto). In disrepair not many years ago, the neighborhood is slowly making a comeback, after local developer IRSA turned the imposing old market into what is today, the city's largest shopping center.

=== Almagro ===
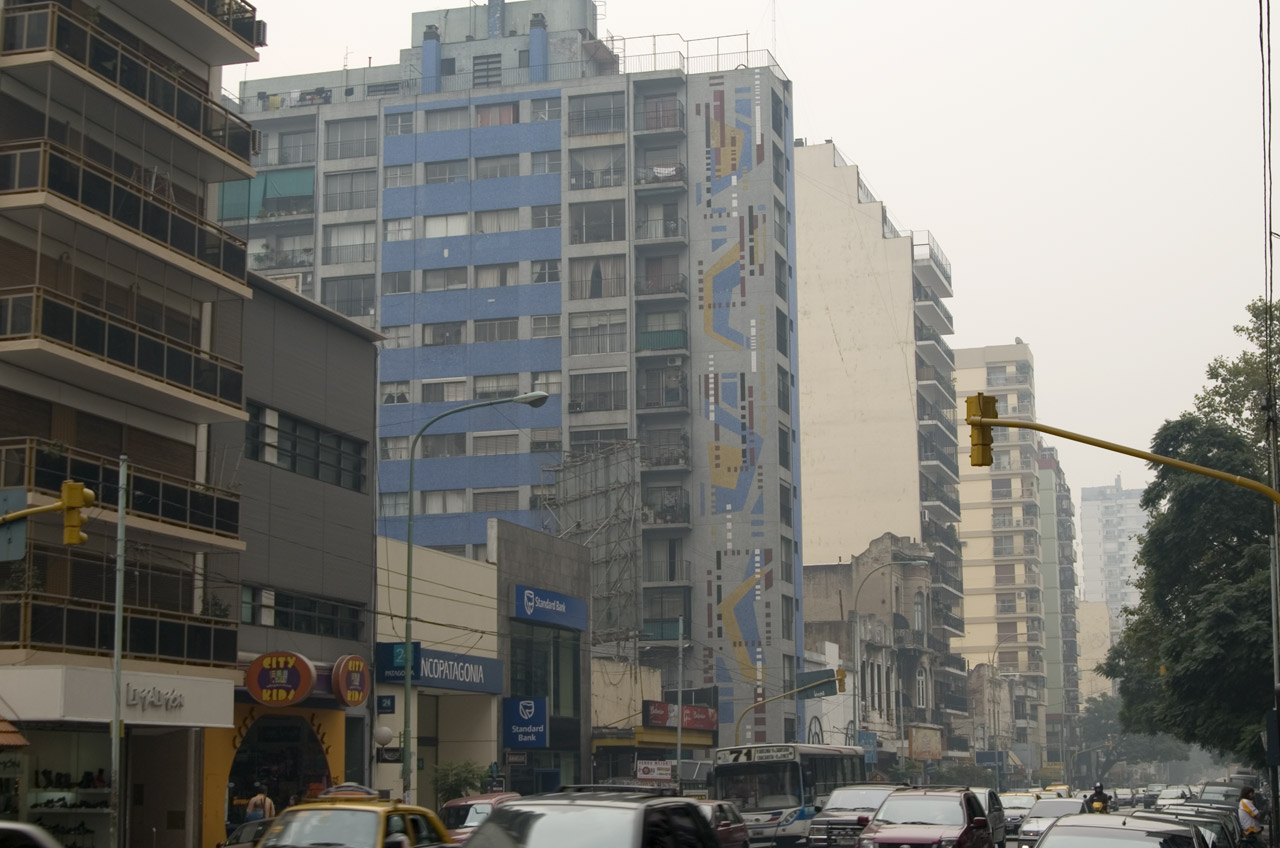
The Villa Crespo section of the avenue

Further down Corrientes is Almagro, a calm residential neighborhood inhabited by apartment-dwellers, with the centre of activity at the intersection of Medrano and Rivadavia Avenues.

=== Villa Crespo ===
Villa Crespo is another traditionally Jewish neighborhood traversed by Corrientes Avenue. Unleavened bread is available for passover, as are other seasonal specialties. It is in this area (formerly called "Triunvirato") that the greater part of the 1948 Leopoldo Marechal novel, Adán Buenosayres, takes place; Marechal also wrote Historia de la Calle Corrientes in 1937. The neighborhood is home to the Atlanta football club. The barrio was home to tango great Osvaldo Pugliese.

=== Chacarita ===
Corrientes ends at the Estación Federico Lacroze train station next to Parque Los Andes, where fairs were held until September 2005. Just west of the park is La Chacarita Cemetery; the largest in Argentina. The cemetery is at times referred to colloquially and in tango lyrics as La Quinta del Ñato (a lunfardo term referring to a person's last dwelling).

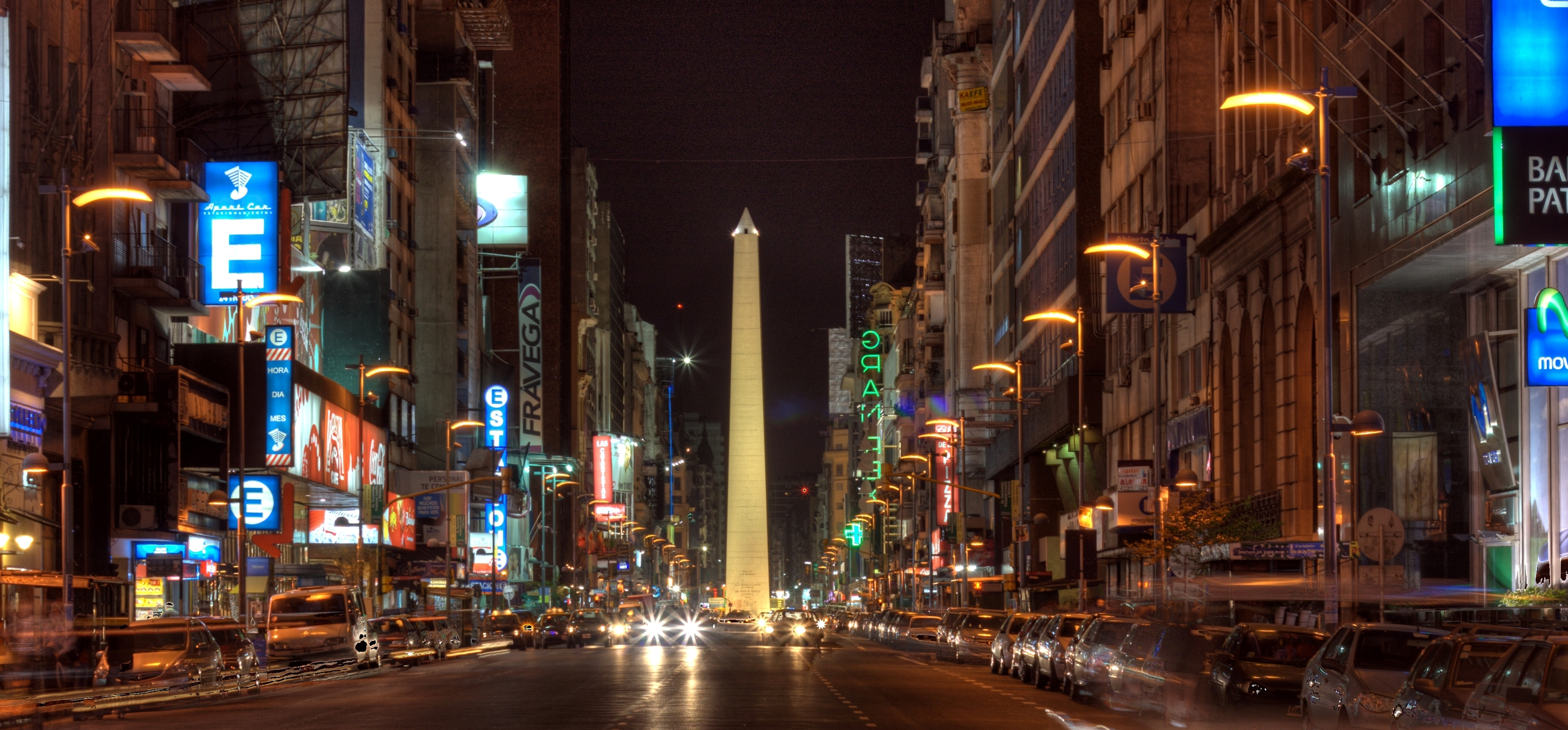
Corrientes Avenue at night

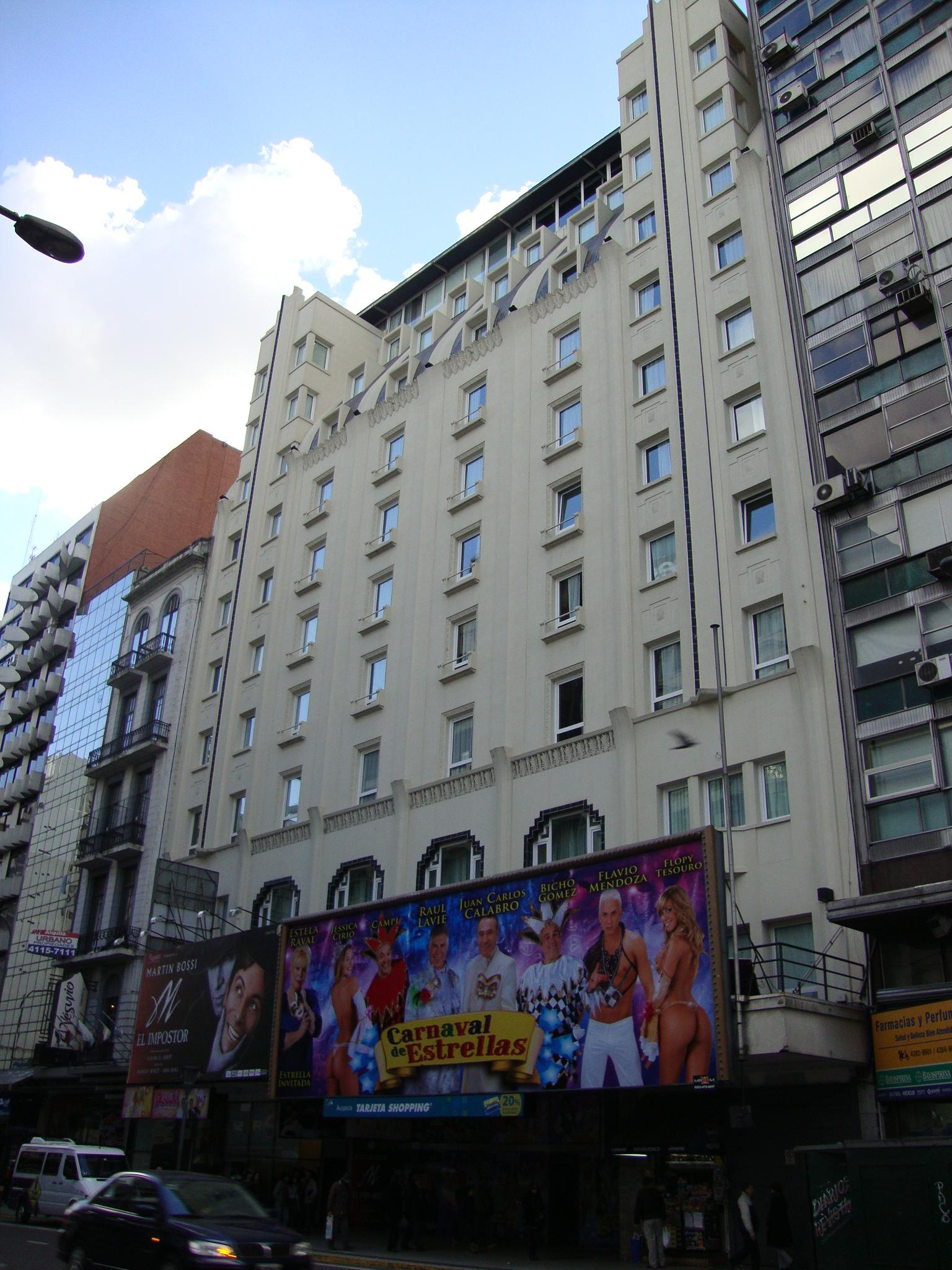
The Broadway Theatre. Corrientes Avenue has long been Buenos Aires' Broadway.

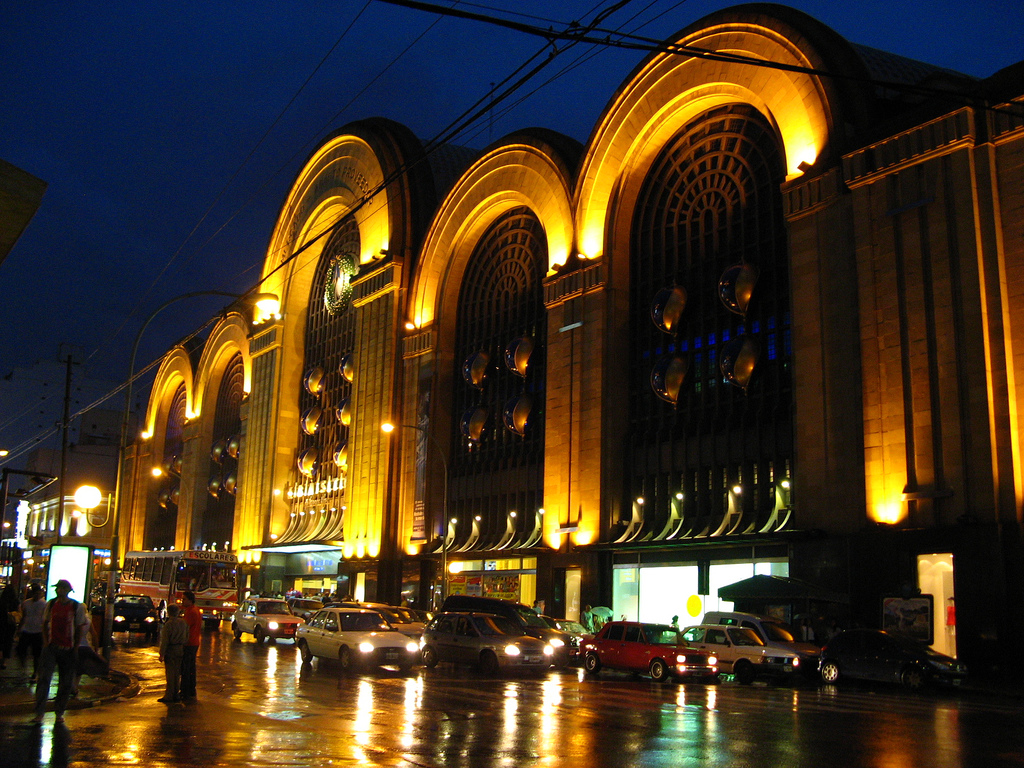
Abasto shopping center. The city's wholesale market until 1984, investor George Soros had it converted in 1998.

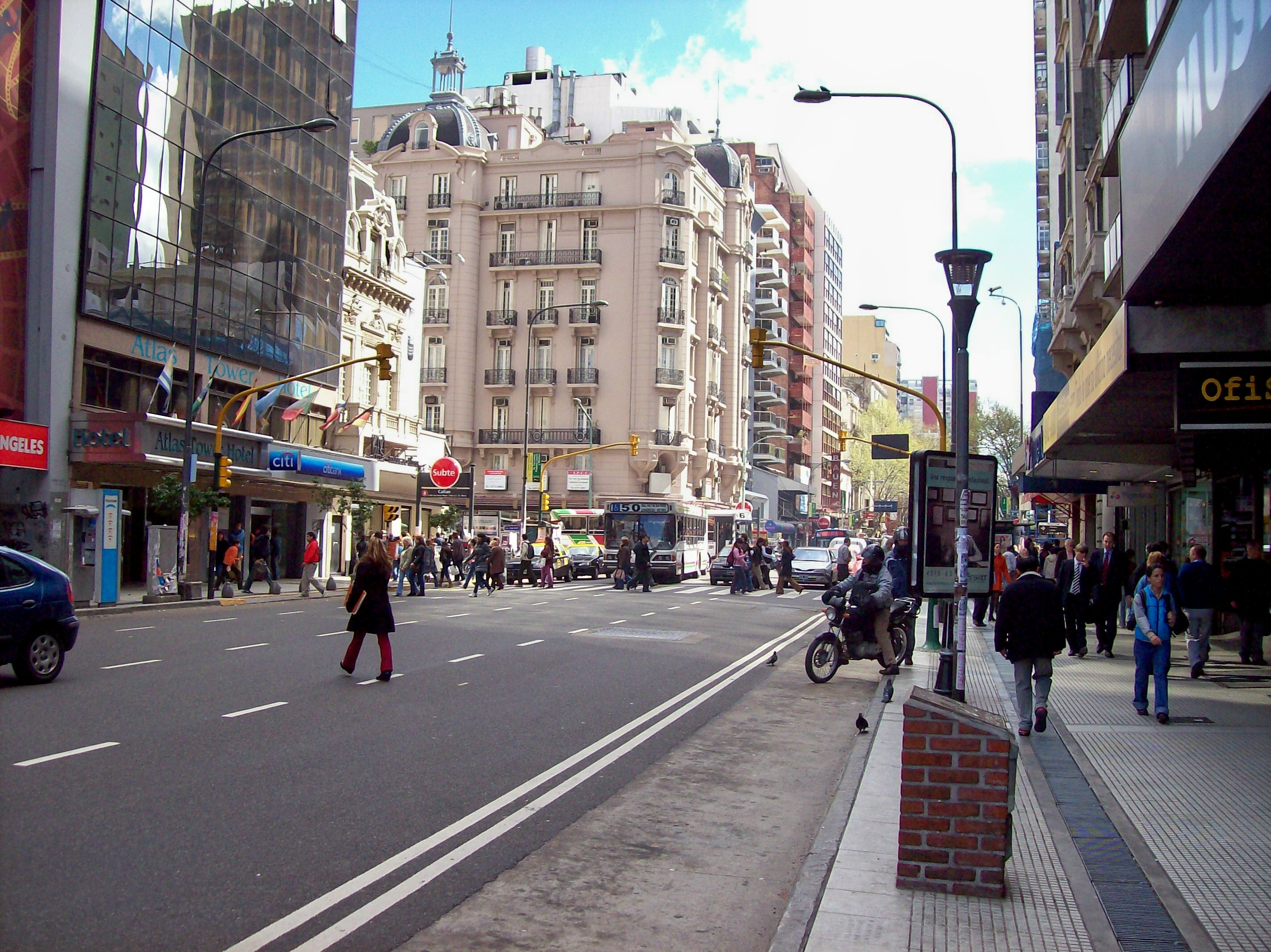
Intersection with upscale Callao Avenue

== Corrientes in tango music ==
Corrientes Avenue is featured in several tango lyrics, notably:

- "A media luz" by Carlos Lenzi and Edgardo Donatto
- "Calle Corrientes" by Alberto Vaccarezza and Enrique Delfino
- "Corrientes angosta" by Ángel "Pocho" Gatti
- "Corrientes y Esmeralda" by Celedonio Flores and Francisco Pracánico
- "Tristezas de la calle Corrientes" by Homero Expósito and Domingo Federico, 1942
- "Pucherito de gallina"
- "Café Dominguez"

== See also ==
- Hotel Jousten
