= Avenida Roque Sáenz Peña =

Street in Buenos Aires, Argentina

Coordinates: 34.60514°S 58.37899°W

Diagonal Norte from Plaza de Mayo.

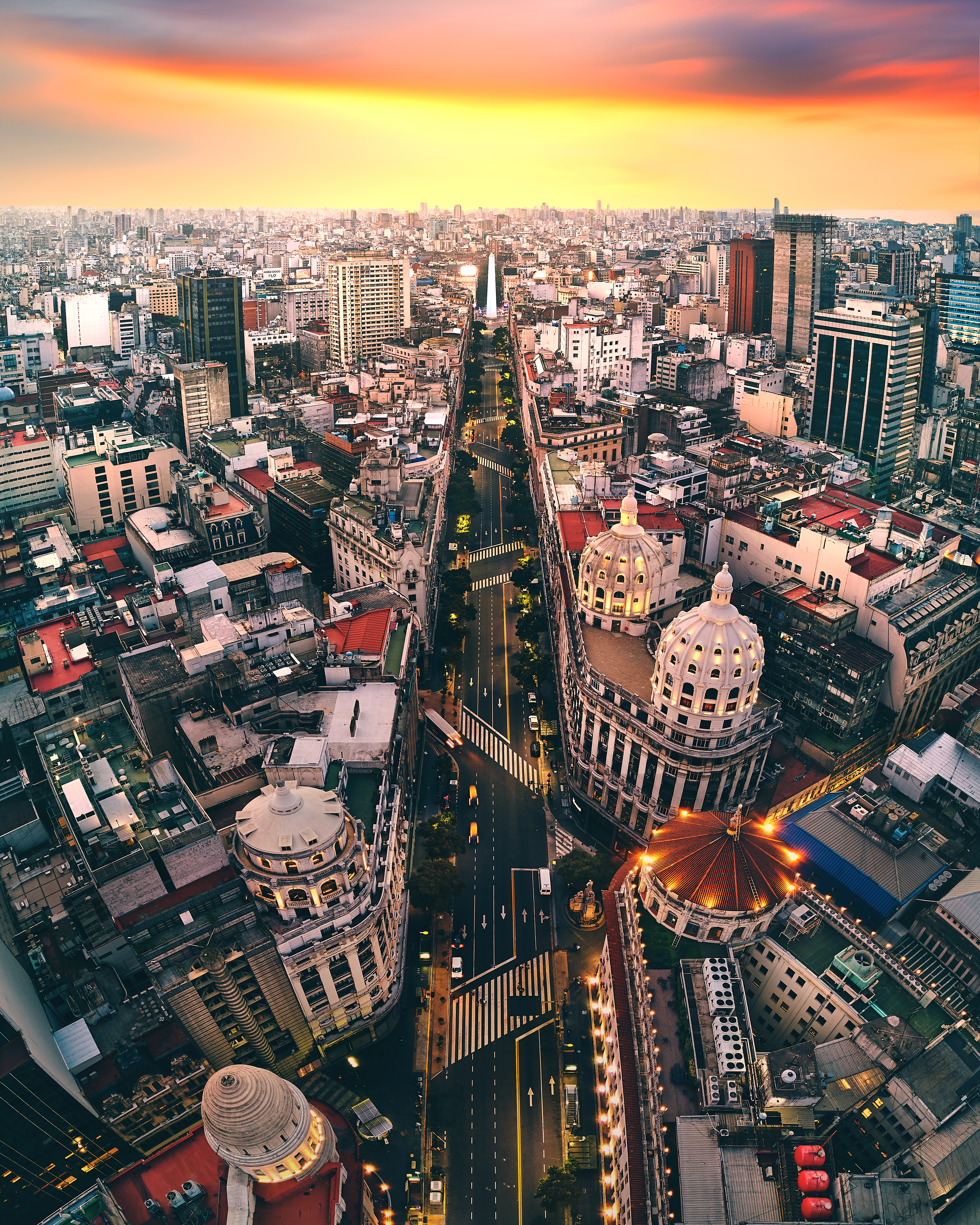
Diagonal Norte from the air.

Avenida Roque Sáenz Peña, better known as Diagonal Norte (Spanish for "North Diagonal", the counterpart to Diagonal Sur), is an important avenue in the San Nicolás neighborhood of Buenos Aires, Argentina. It is oriented south-east/north-west, diagonally bisecting the city blocks (manzanas) which give the city centre a checkerboard plan. It is named after President Roque Sáenz Peña, who held power from 1910 to 1914 and passed the law which established universal suffrage, secret ballot and an electoral register.

== Connections ==
The north-west corner of Plaza de Mayo is the start of Avenida Presidente Roque Sáenz Peña (i.e. the corner of Avenida Rivadavia and San Martín street), just to the north of the city hall. It runs directly to the northwest and diagonally crosses the following streets: Bartolomé Mitre, Juan Domingo Perón and Sarmiento, and calle Florida, Maipú, Esmeralda, Suipacha and the Carabelas passage, before arriving at Plaza de la República, location of the Obelisk of Buenos Aires, where Avenida 9 de julio meets Avenida Corrientes. Still in a straight diagonal line, it crosses this intersection and continues to the next crossroads, the junction of Lavalle and Libertad in Plaza Lavalle, opposite the Courts of Justice.

== Underground ==
Below the entire length of the avenue runs line of the Buenos Aires Underground, which has two stations along the Diagonal (stations Catedral and 9 de julio) and a third station (Tribunales) near its western end. Line of the Buenos Aires Underground also has one station: Diagonal Norte.

== Points of interest ==
Avenida Roque Sáenz Peña (Diagonal Norte)

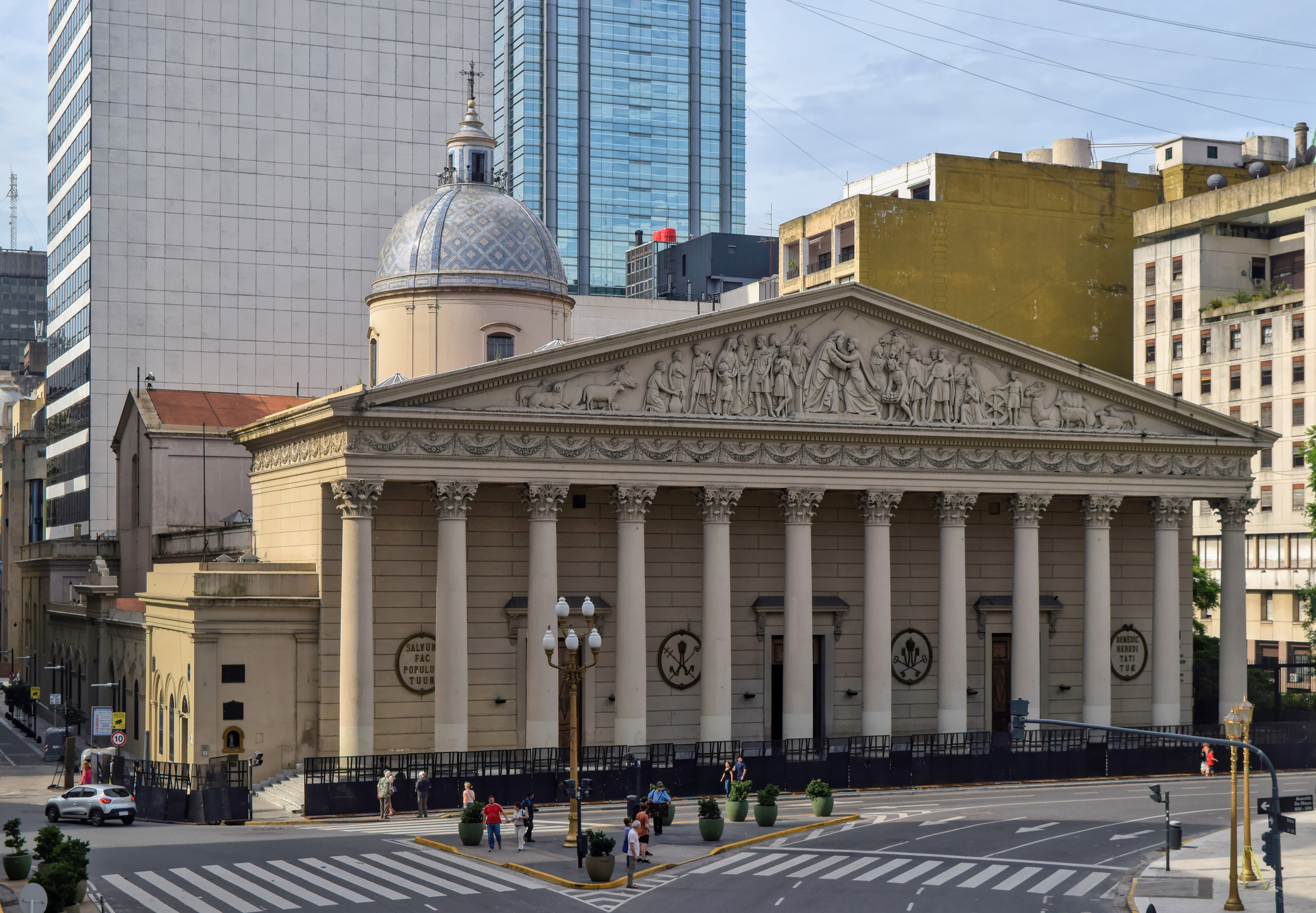
Buenos Aires Metropolitan Cathedral

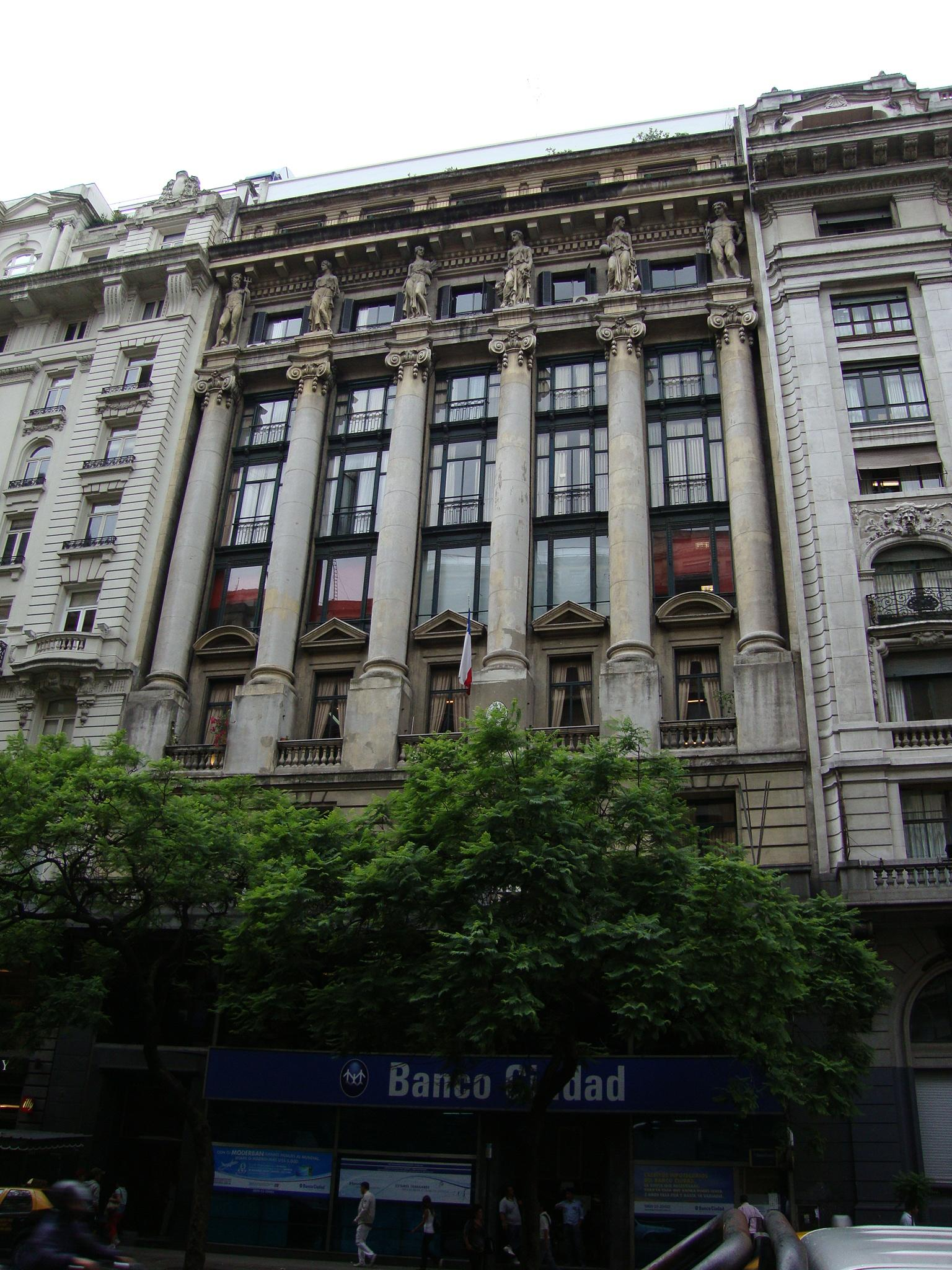
Menéndez Behety building

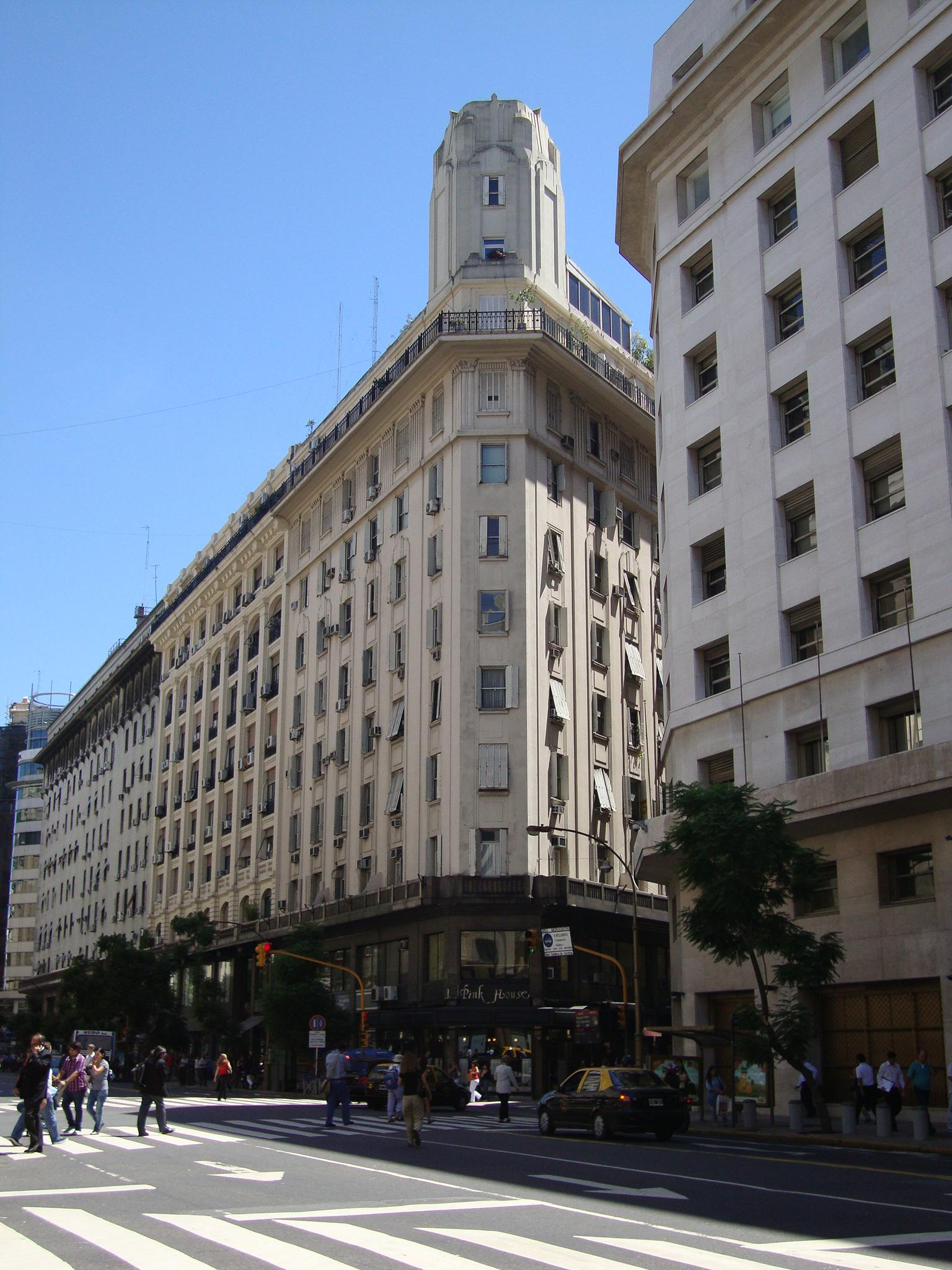
La Unión building

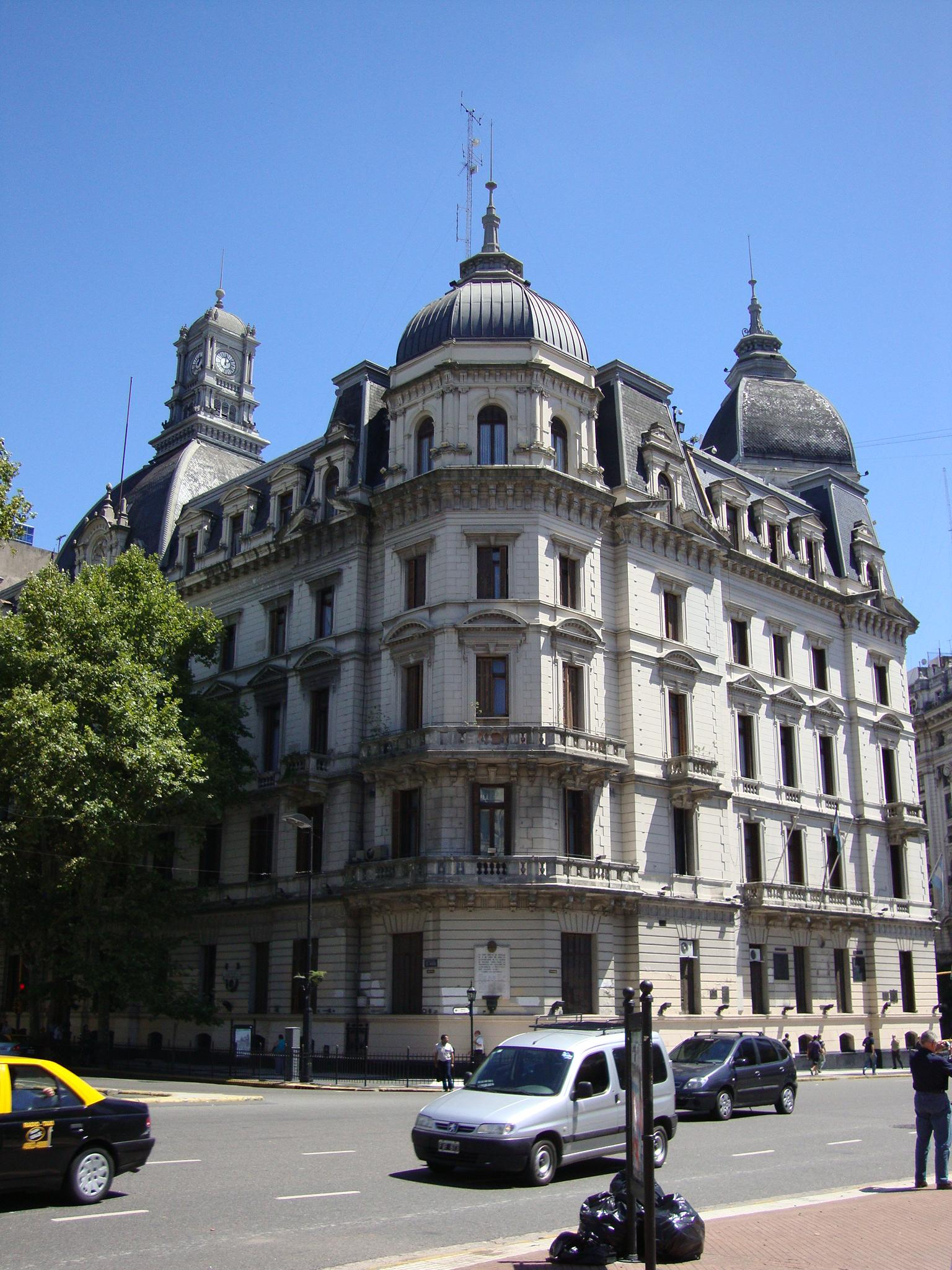
Buenos Aires City Hall

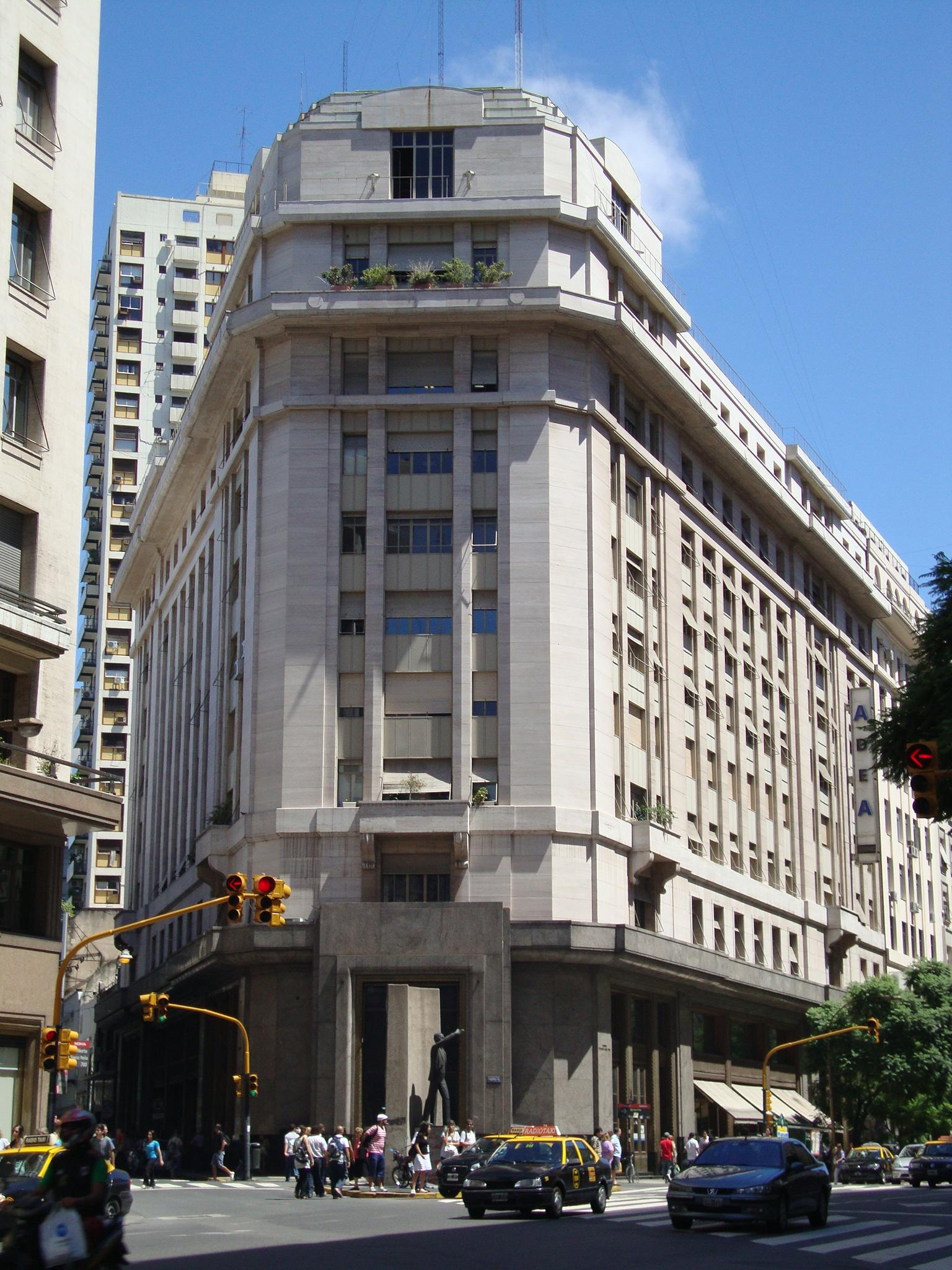
Volta building

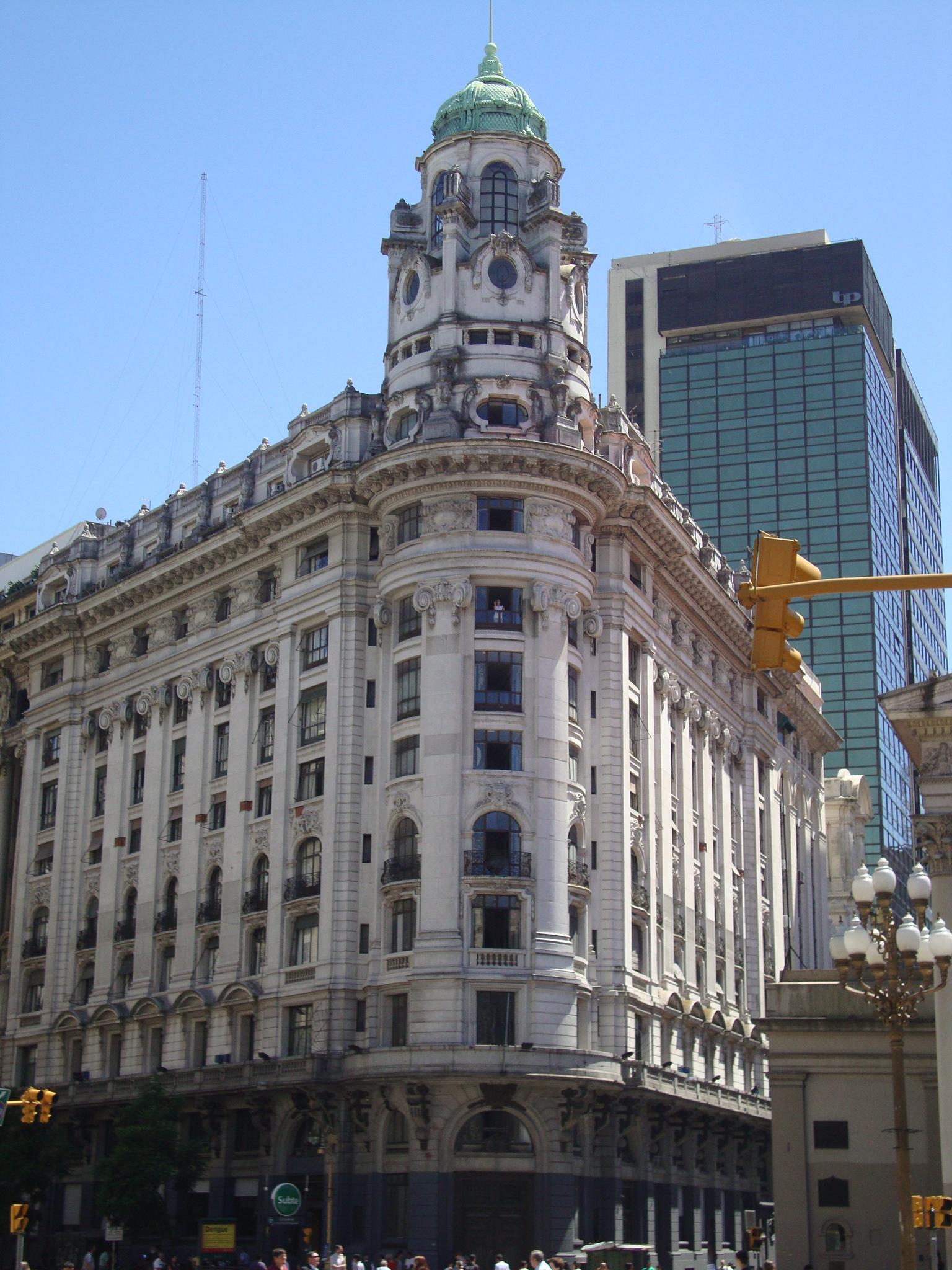
Argentine Uruguayan Bank Building

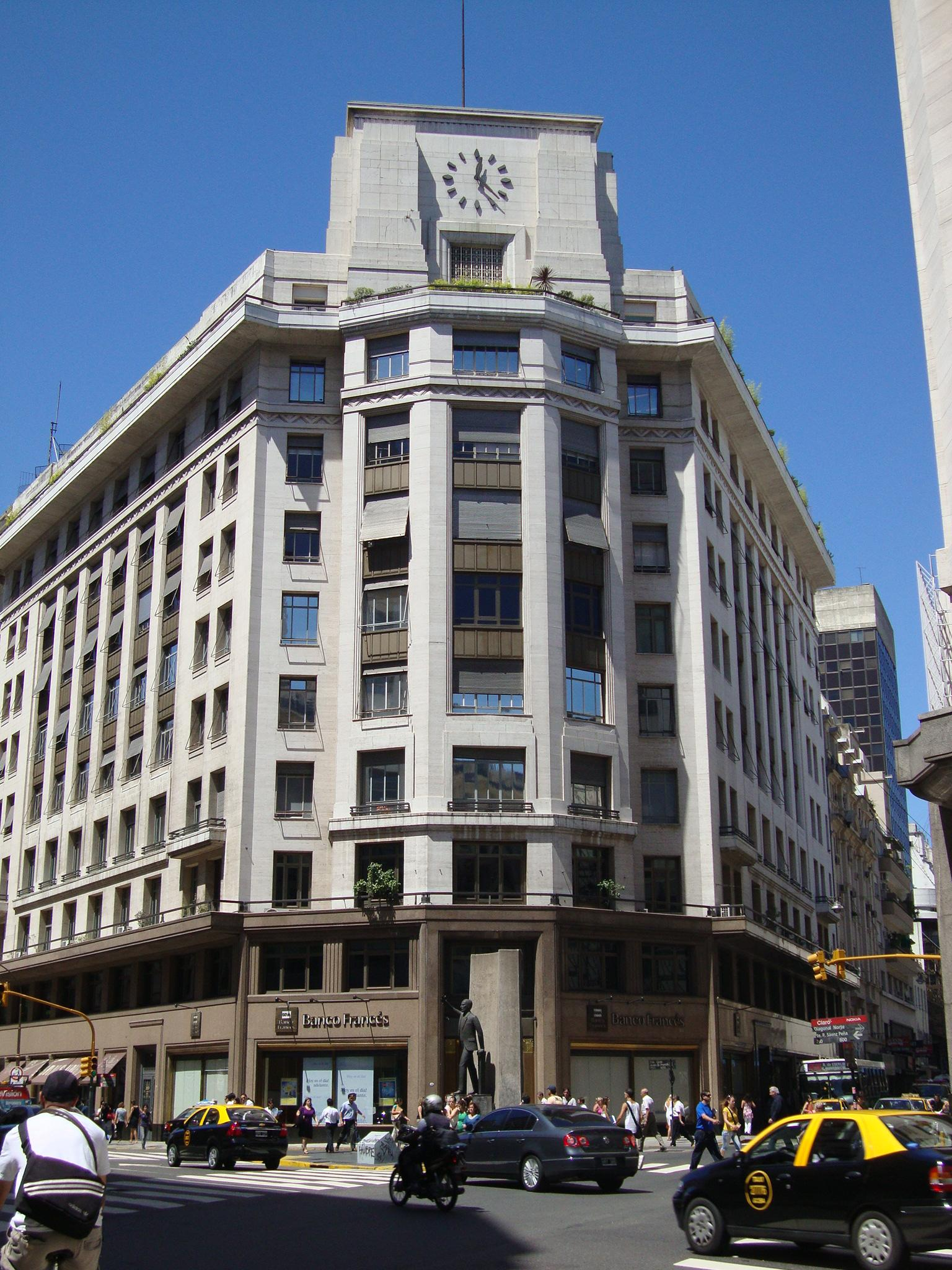
Shell Mex building

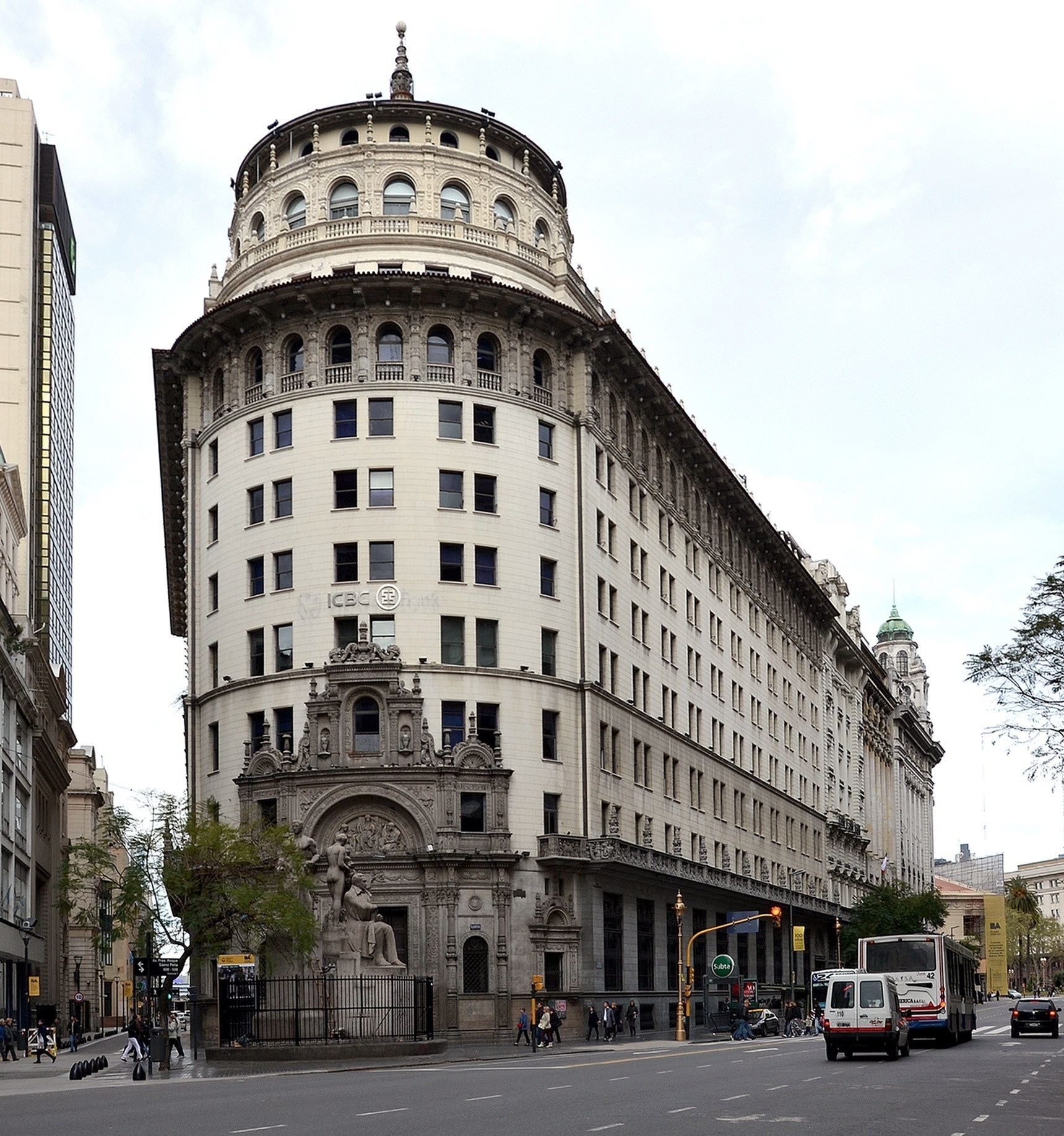
Banco de Boston Building

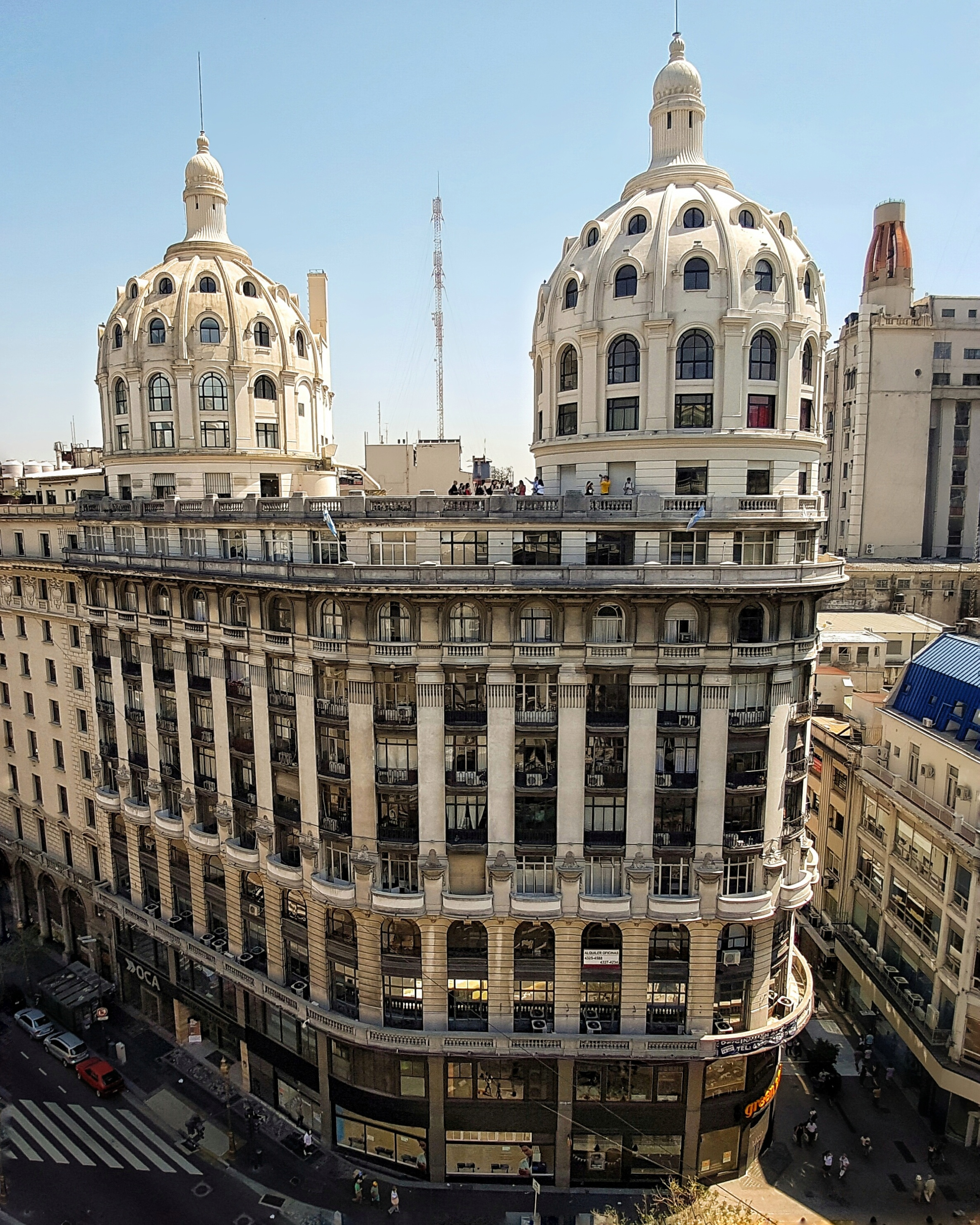
Bencich Building

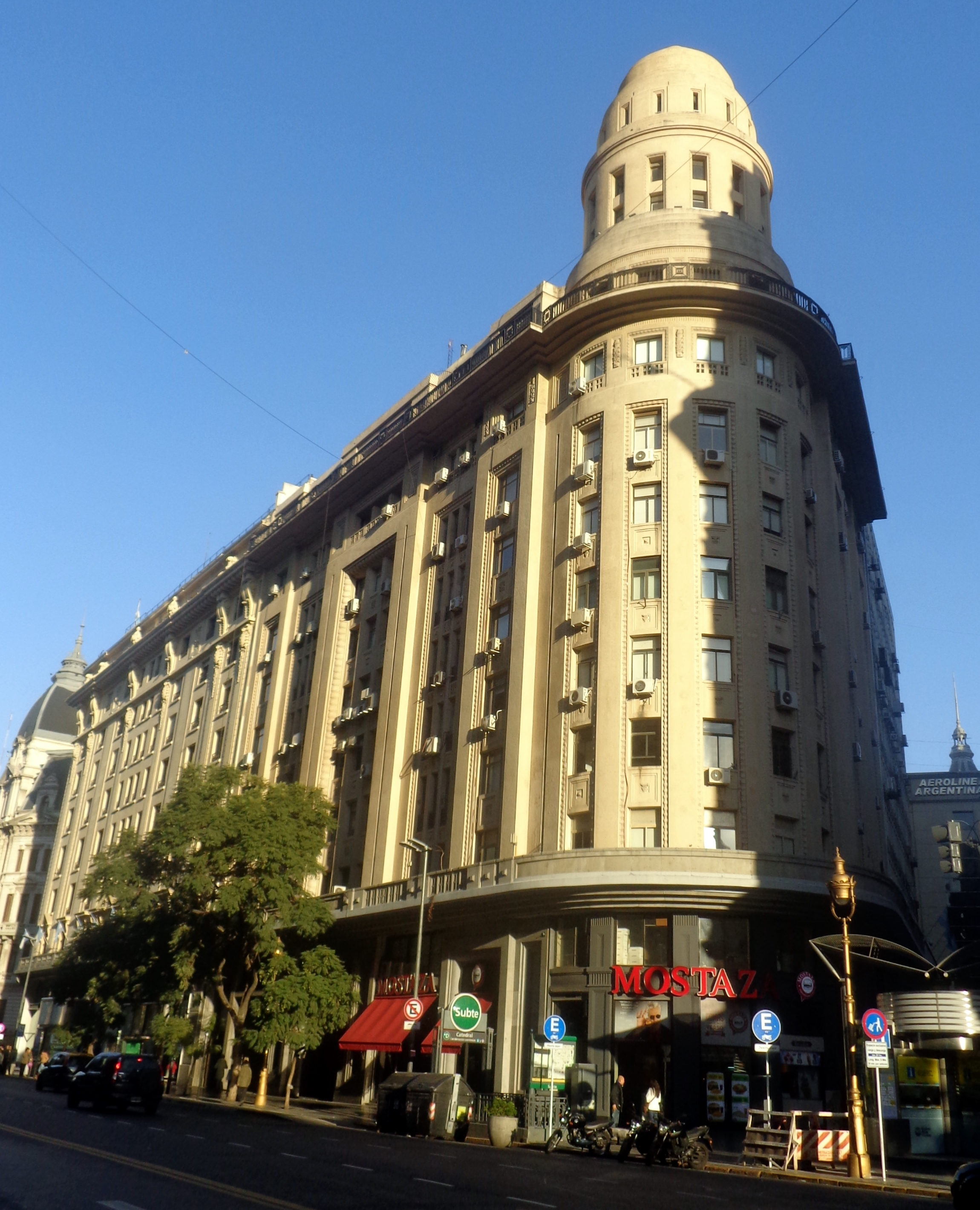
La Equitativa del Plata Building
