= Presidente Roque Sáenz Peña =

Neighbourhood of Saavedra, Buenos Aires, Argentina

Presidente Roque Sáenz Peña is a neighbourhood of the barrio of Saavedra, in the city of Buenos Aires, Argentina, named after President of Argentina, Roque Sáenz Peña.

It is located around Valdenegro street with many single-storey houses.

There is also a town called Presidencia Roque Sáenz Peña in Chaco Province, and a Presidente Roque Sáenz Peña Department in Córdoba Province. There is also a Sáenz Peña, a Buenos Aires suburb named after Luis Sáenz Peña.

Newcastle United F.C winger Jonas Gutierrez was born in Roque Saenz Peña.
