= Ghulam =

Ghulam (Arabic: غلام, ALA-LC: ghulām) is an Arabic word meaning servant, assistant, boy, or youth. It is used to describe young servants in Jannah. It is also used to refer to slave-soldiers in the Abbasid, Ottoman, Safavid and to a lesser extent, Mughal Empires, though more commonly with the word Ghilman, which is the plural form of ghulam.

It is traditionally used as the first element of compounded Muslim male given names, meaning servant of ..., mostly in Persian (where it is pronounced Gholâm) and in Urdu. In both Persian and Urdu, the particle al- is not used with ghulam (unlike compounds formed with ʿabd; e.g. Gholammohammad, Gholamhoseyn, Gholamali... and Abd al-Muhammad, Abd al-Husayn, Abd al-Ali...). Since the 20th century, Ghulam has also been used as an independent given name and surname.

== People with the given name (not in compound) ==
- Mohammad Golam Shahi Alam (born 1952), Bangladeshi academic and surgeon
- Golam Ambia (born 1966), Bangladeshi sprinter
- Ghulam Bombaywala, Pakistani-American restaurateur
- Golam Mabud Chowdhury (born 1984), Bangladeshi cricketer
- Golam Wahed Choudhury (1926–1997), Bangladeshi diplomat and political scientist
- Golam Habib Dulal (born 1943), Bangladeshi politician
- Mirza Ghulam Hafiz (1920–2000), Bangladeshi statesman and philanthropist
- Golam Hasnayen (1929–2021), Bangladeshi lawyer and activist
- Golam Kabir (academic), vice-chancellor of Sheikh Hasina University
- Golam Helal Morshed Khan (born 1948), Bangladeshi major general
- R. A. M. Golam Muktadir (died 2020), former Director General of Bangladesh Rifles
- Ghulam Murshid (1940–2024), Bangladeshi author, scholar and journalist
- A. F. Golam Osmani (1933–2009), Indo-Bengali politician
- Mia Golam Parwar (born 1959), Bangladeshi politician
- Arbab Ghulam Rahim (born 1957), Pakistani politician
- Ghulam Raziq (1932–1989), Pakistani hurdler
- Golam Shabbir Sattar (born 1962), Bangladeshi vice-chancellor of the University of Rajshahi
- Ghulam Arieff Tipoo (1931–2024), Chief Prosecutor of the International Crimes Tribunal
- Golam Sabur Tulu (1953–2013), Bangladeshi politician
- Ghulam Yazdani (1885–1962), Hyderabadi archaeologist
- Golam Yazdani (1917–2009), former cabinet minister of West Bengal

== People with the surname ==
- Nabil Gholam (born 1962), Lebanese architect
- Jassim Ghulam Al-Hamd (born 1979), Iraqi footballer
- Ali Gholam (born 1981), Iranian footballer
- Saleem Golam, Mauritian jockey
- Kamran Ghulam, Pakistani cricketer

== List of compounded given names with first part Ghulam ==
- Ghulam Abbas
- Ghulam Ahmad, also Ghulam Ahmed
- Ghulam Akbar
- Ghulam Ali
- Ghulam Azam (1922–2014), Bangladeshi politician
- Ghulam Dastagir
- Ghulam Farid
- Ghulam Faruq
- Ghulam Ghawth
- Ghulam Hassan
- Ghulam Haider
- Ghulam Hussain also Gholam Hossein etc.
- Ghulam Ishaq, notably borne by
  - Ghulam Ishaq Khan (1915–2006), President of Pakistan
- Ghulam Jilani
- Ghulam Kibria
- Ghulam Mansur, notably borne by
  - Ghulam Mansoor (1812-??), Subedar-Major at Bhopal State in 1867
- Ghulam Mohammad, also Ghulam Mohammed, Ghulam Muhammad etc., notably borne by
  - Ghulam Mohammad Baksh Butt (1878–1960), Pakistani wrestler known as "The Great Gama"
- Ghulam Masih, notably borne by
  - Golam Moshi, Bangladeshi diplomat
- Ghulam Mawla
- Ghulam Mohiuddin, also other spellings
- Ghulam Murtaza
- Ghulam Murshid
- Ghulam Mustafa
- Ghulam Nabi, notably borne by
  - Ghulam Nabi Azad (born 1949) Indian politician
- Ghulam Qadir
- Ghulam Rabbani
- Ghulam Rahman
- Ghulam Rasul, also Ghulam Rasool
- Gholam Reza, notably borne by
  - Gholam Reza Pahlavi
- Ghulam Samdani
- Ghulam Sadiq
- Ghulam Sarwar

== See also ==
- Ghilman, young servants in paradise or slave-soldiers in the Abbasid, Ottoman, Safavid and to a lesser extent, Mughal empires
- Ghulam Khan, town in North Waziristan, Pakistan
- Bauria Golam Khalek Academy, secondary school in Sandwip, Bangladesh
- Abd (Arabic)
- Qul (Turkic)
