= Ghulam Ali =

Ghulam Ali (Arabic: غلام علی, Persian: غلام‌علی) is a Muslim male given name. In Persian, it is transliterated as Gholam Ali. It may refer to:

== People ==
- Shah Ghulam Ali Dehlavi (1743–1824), Sufi Shaykh in Delhi
- Gholam Ali-khan (1783–1784), khan of the Erivan khanate
- Golam Ali Chowdhury (1824–1888), Bengali landlord and philanthropist
- Ahmed Ghulamali Chagla (1902–1953), Pakistani musical composer
- Bade Ghulam Ali Khan (1902–1968), Indian classical singer who belonged to the Patiala Gharana
- Gholam Ali Oveisi (1918–1984), Iranian general
- Ghulam Ali (singer) (born 1940), Pakistani ghazal singer of the Patiala gharana
- Gholam-Ali Haddad-Adel (born 1945), Iranian philosopher and politician
- Ghulam Ali (cricketer) (born 1966), Pakistani cricketer
- Ghulam Ali Allana (1906–1985), friend and biographer of Muhammad Ali Jinnah, founder of Pakistan
- Mir Ghulam Ali (1758–1863), official of the Tippu Sultanate

== Places ==
- Gholamali, Hamadan, village in Razan County, Hamadan Province, Iran
- Gholamali, Khuzestan, village in Andika County, Khuzestan Province, Iran
- Gholamali, Kurdistan, village in Saqqez County, Kurdistan Province, Iran
- Gholam Ali, Sistan and Baluchestan, village in Hirmand County, Sistan and Baluchestan Province, Iran
- Porzinastan, also known as Gholamali, Shushtar County, Khuzestan Province, Iran
- Kas Ali Mirzayi, also known as Gholam Ali, Kuhdasht County, Lorestan Province, Iran

== See also ==
- Ghulam (disambiguation)
- Ali (disambiguation)
