= Gholam Reza =

Gholam Reza or Gholamreza (Persian: غلام رضا) is a masculine given name and surname of Arabic origin. Notable people with the name include:

== Given name ==
- Gholamreza Aavani (born 1943), Iranian philosopher
- Gholam Reza Afkhami (1936–2024), Iranian politician anad historian, now resideant in USA
- Gholam Reza Aghazadeh (born 1949), Iranian politician
- Gholamreza Ansari (born 1956), Iranian politician
- Gholamreza Khan Arkawazi (1770–1839), Kurdish poet
- Gholam Reza Azhari (1917–2001), military leader and Prime Minister of Iran
- Gholamreza Baghabadi (born 1958), Iranian footballer
- Gholamreza Emrani (born 1947), Iranian linguist
- Gholamreza Enayati or Reza Enayati (born 1976), Iranian footballer
- Gholamreza Farrokhi (born 2002), Iranian Greco-Roman wrestler
- Gholamreza Fathabadi (born 1957), Iranian footballer
- Gholamreza Forouzesh (born 1955), Iranian engineer and politician
- Gholamreza Ghassab (born 1956), Iranian wrestler
- Gholamreza Nouri Ghezeljeh (born 1970), Iranian politician
- Gholamreza Ghodsi (1925–1989), Iranian belletrist and poet
- Gholamreza Hassani (1927–2018), Iranian conservative imam
- Gholamreza Heydari (born 1955), Iranian engineer and politician
- Gholamreza Sabet Imani (born 2000), Iranian footballer
- Gholamreza Jalali (born 1955), Iranian brigadier general
- Gholamreza Kianpour (1929–1979), Iranian politician
- Gholamreza Khosroo Kurdieh (1965–1997), Iranian serial killer and rapist
- Gholamreza Mehrabi (1961–2025), Iranian Brigadier General
- Gholamreza Mesri (born 1940), Iranian-American engineer
- Gholam Reza Minbashian (1861–1935), Iranian composer
- Gholamreza Mesbahi-Moghaddam (born 1951), Iranian politician
- Gholamreza Mohammadi (born 1970), Iranian freestyle wrestler
- Gholamreza Naalchegar or Reza Naalchegar (born 1958), Iranian footballer
- Gholamreza Nikpey (1927–1979), executed Iranian politician
- Gholamreza Pahlavi (1923–2017), Iranian prince of the Pahlavi dynasty
- Gholam-Reza Pourmand, Iranian urologist
- Gholamreza Rahimi (born 1978), Iranian Paralympic archer
- Gholamreza Rezaei (born 1984), Iranian footballer
- Gholamreza Rezaian (died 2026), Iranian brigadier general
- Gholamreza Rezvani (1922–2013), Iranian Ayatollah
- Gholamreza Rouhani (1897–1985), Iranian humorous poet
- Gholamreza Khosravi Savadjani (1965–2014), executed political prisoner
- Gholamreza Shafeei (born 1951), Iranian politician
- Gholamreza Shariati (born 1972), Iranian politician
- Gholam Reza Sinambari, Iranian engineer
- Gholamreza Soleimani (1964–2026), Iranian military officer
- Gholamreza Tajgardoon (born 1966), Iranian reformist politician
- Gholamreza Takhti (1930–1968), Iranian Olympic Gold-Medalist wrestler
- Gholamreza Rashid Yasemi (1895–1951), Iranian poet and translator

== Surname ==
- HM Golam Reza, Bangladeshi politician

== Places in Iran ==
- Hajji Gholamreza, a village in North Khorasan Province
- Gholamreza, Khuzestan, a village in Khuzestan Province
- Chichali Gholamreza, a village in Khuzestan Province
