= Ghulam Jilani =

Ghulam Jilani or Golam Jilani, meaning "Servant of Jilani", is a male Muslim given name. Notable people with the name include:

- Hakim Ghulam Jilani (1873–1926), Indian physician
- Ghulam Jilani Barq (1901–1985), Pakistani Islamic scholar
- A.K. Golam Jilani (1904–1932), Bengali revolutionary
- Mian Ghulam Jilani (1913–2004), Pakistani soldier and politician
- Golam Jilani Chowdhury (born 1922), Bangladeshi politician
- Ghulam Jilani Khan (1924–1999), 21st Governor of Punjab, Pakistan
- Ghulam Jilani Popal (born 1955), Afghan minister

== See also ==
- Ghulam (disambiguation)
