= Ghulam Faruq =

Ghulam Faruq (Persian: غلام فاروق; transliterations vary), meaning "Servant of Farooq", is a male Muslim given name popular in Afghanistan, Bangladesh and Pakistan. Notable bearers of the name include:

- Ghulam Faruque Khan (1899–1992), Pakistani economist, bureaucrat, politician and industrialist
- Ghulam Faruq Yaqubi (born 1938), Afghan politician and Army General
- Syed Gulam Farooq Mirranay (born 1950), Member of the Afghan National Parliament
- Ghulam Faroq Nijrabi (born 1954), medical doctor who stood for President of Afghanistan in 2009
- Ghulam Farooq Wardak (born 1959), Afghan Minister of Education
- Ghulam Farooq Awan (born 1961), Pakistani lawyer and politician
- Khandker Golam Faruq (born 1964), 34th Police Commissioner of Dhaka Metropolitan Police, Bangladesh
- Golam Faruk Khandakar Prince (born 1969), Bangladeshi politician
- Golam Faruq Suru, Bangladeshi cricketer
- Golam Faruque Ovi, Bangladeshi politician
- Mohammed Golam Faruque Pinku, Bangladeshi politician
- Ghulam Farooq (detainee), Afghan held in Bagram

== See also ==
- Ghulam
