= Ghulam Qadir (disambiguation) =

Ghulam Qadir (Persian: غلام قادر, transliterations vary, 'Servant of the Competent') may refer to:

- Ghulam Qadir (Ghulam Abd al Qadir Ahmed Khan, died 1789), Indo-Afghan commander
- Gulam Kadir Navalar (1833–1908), Tamil poet
- Jam Ghulam Qadir Khan (1920–1988), chief minister of Balochistan
- Ghulam Qadir Wani (politician, born 1926), Kashmiri politician
- Ghulam Qadir Ganipuri (1937–2015), Indian Muslim scholar
- Ghulam Qadir Wani (1953–1998), Kashmiri diplomat and scholar
- Ghulam Qadir Wani (politician, born 1942), Kashmiri politician
- Ghulam Qadir Chandio (born 1959), Pakistani politician
- Ghulam Qadir Khan Bhittani (born 1968), Pakistani advocate
- Ghulam Qadir Jatoi (fl. 1996), Pakistani advocate
- Golam Kader, Bangladeshi army officer 1961–1996

== See also ==
- Ghulam
