= Ghulam Nabi =

Ghulam Nabi (Arabic: غلام نبی) is a male Muslim given name. It is the name of:

- Mian Ghulam Nabi Shori (1742–1792), Indian composer of Hindustani classical music
- Khan Bahadur Ghulam Nabi Kazi (1884–1955), educationist in British India
- Aftab Ghulam Nabi Kazi (1919–2016), Pakistani politician
- Bashir Ghulam Nabi Kazi (1921–1986), Pakistani judge
- Ghulam Nabi Firaq (born 1922), Kashmiri poet, writer and an educationist
- Ghulam Nabi Azad (born 1949), Indian politician
- Ghulam Nabi Khan (died 1932), Afghan ambassador
- Syed Ghulam Nabi Fai (born 1949), American citizen of Kashmiri origin, imprisoned for conspiracy and tax evasion
- Ghulam Nabi Bhat, also called Fareed Parbati (1961–2011), Urdu language poet and writer from Kashmir
- Ghulam Nabi Sheikh (died 2003), Indian singer and composer
- Ghulam Nabi (died 2007), the victim of the beheading of Ghulam Nabi

== See also ==
- Ghulam Nabi Kelay, village in Helmand Province, Afghanistan
- Chah-e Haji Qolamnabi, village in Sistan and Baluchestan Province, Iran
