= Arrest of Mehraj Malik =

Arrest of Indian Politician Mehraj Malik

- Court: High Court of Jammu & Kashmir and Ladakh
- Full case name: Mehraj Din Malik Th. Father Shamas Din v. Union Territory of Jammu & Kashmir & Others
- Decided: Bailed (order quashed: 27 April 2026;)
- Citation: HCP No. 139/2025

Case history
- Prior actions: Detention Order No. 05 of 2025 dated 08 September 2025 issued by District Magistrate, Doda under J&K Public Safety Act, 1978

Court membership
- Judges sitting: Justice Vinod Chatterji Koul; Justice Sanjay Dhar; Justice Rajnesh Oswal; Justice Mohd Yousuf Wani; Justice Rajesh Sekhri

Keywords
- Public Safety Act; Habeas corpus; Preventive detention; Article 21; Article 22; Jammu and Kashmir (union territory); Mehraj Malik

On September 8, 2025, Mehraj Malik was placed under preventive detention under the Jammu and Kashmir Public Safety Act, 1978 (PSA). Malik, the sole Member of the Legislative Assembly (MLA) from the Aam Aadmi Party (AAP) in Jammu and Kashmir, representing the Doda East assembly constituency, was arrested on grounds of activities prejudicial to public order. The detention, the first of a sitting MLA under the PSA in the Union Territory, sparked protests, internet suspensions, and political controversy. Malik challenged the order via a habeas corpus petition in the High Court of Jammu and Kashmir and Ladakh, seeking quashing of the detention and ₹5 crore in compensation.

== Background ==
Mehraj Malik, born in 1988, is a social worker and politician from Doda district in Jammu and Kashmir. He joined the AAP in 2013 and contested independently in the 2014 assembly elections. In 2020, he won the District Development Council election from Kahara. Malik was appointed AAP's Jammu and Kashmir state president on March 21, 2025. He secured victory in the 2024 Jammu and Kashmir Legislative Assembly election from Doda, defeating the BJP candidate by 4,538 votes, becoming the party's first and only MLA in the region.

Prior to his arrest, Malik had a history of legal issues, including 18 First Information Reports (FIRs) and 16 Daily Diary Reports (DDRs) between 2014 and 2025. These involved allegations of assaulting public servants, unlawful assembly, intimidation, hate speech, and violation of prohibitory orders. In May 2025, he allegedly threatened doctors at Government Medical College, Doda, leading to a strike and an FIR.

The immediate trigger was a viral video from early September 2025, where Malik allegedly used abusive language against Doda Deputy Commissioner Harvinder Singh during a dispute over pending dues for relief workers amid floods and heavy rains in the region. On September 5, tensions escalated over the shifting of a primary health sub-centre in Kencha village in Malik's constituency, which Malik had relocated to a building allegedly owned by one of his supporters; Malik argued that the structure was safer and more accessible for villagers.

== Arrest and Detention Order ==
On September 8, 2025, Doda District Magistrate Harvinder Singh issued Detention Order No. 05 of 2025 under Section 8 of the PSA, authorizing Malik's preventive detention for up to one year without trial. The order cited Malik's "continual unlawful conduct" as a "grave threat" to public order, referencing his history of FIRs and recent inflammatory remarks. Malik was arrested at Dak Bungalow, Doda, while en route to flood-affected areas, and initially lodged in Bhaderwah Jail before transfer to Kathua District Jail.

The PSA, enacted in 1978, permits detention without charges if deemed necessary for state security or public order. Critics, including Amnesty International, have labeled it "draconian."

== Protests and Public Reaction ==
Malik's arrest triggered immediate protests in Doda, Thathri, Bhalessa, and Jammu, with demonstrators demanding revocation of the PSA and his release. Clashes with security forces led to injuries, over 200 detentions, and 15 FIRs against protesters. Authorities imposed Section 144 restrictions, suspended internet services, and deployed additional forces.

Political reactions were swift. Jammu and Kashmir Chief Minister Omar Abdullah condemned the arrest as an "attack on democracy." AAP national convenor Arvind Kejriwal called it a "grave crime" for demanding healthcare facilities. National Conference leaders Farooq and Omar Abdullah, Congress's G.A. Mir, and PDP's Mehbooba Mufti criticized the move as undemocratic. AAP demanded a special assembly session and urged Chief Minister Omar Abdullah to visit Malik in jail.

An online petition on Change.org titled "Release Mehraj Malik and Repeal PSA from Jammu and Kashmir" garnered significant support. Senior advocate Nirmal K. Kotwal withdrew from AAP's legal team on September 18, citing objectionable videos of Malik.

== Legal Proceedings ==
On September 24, 2025, Malik filed Habeas Corpus Petition (HCP) No. 139/2025 in the High Court of Jammu and Kashmir and Ladakh at Jammu, challenging the detention as "arbitrary and mala fide" and seeking immediate release and ₹5 crore compensation for rights violations under Articles 21 and 22 of the Indian Constitution. The petition alleged bias by the District Magistrate.

Justice Vinod Chatterji Koul admitted the petition and issued notices to respondents, including the Principal Secretary (Home), Doda DM, SSP Doda, and Kathua Jail Superintendent, directing responses by October 14. Senior Additional Advocate General Monika Kohli accepted notices in court.

Subsequent hearings:

- October 14, 2025: Before Justice Sanjay Dhar; adjourned for responses by November 7, with interim plea for assembly participation and Rajya Sabha voting.
- November 7, 2025: Before Justice Rajnesh Oswal; fixed for final hearing on November 20.
- November 20, 2025: Before Justice Mohd Yousuf Wani; arguments heard for over an hour; adjourned to December 4, with detention records ordered.
- December 4, 2025: Marked part-heard before Justice Mohd Yousuf Wani; final arguments scheduled for December 18.
- December 27, 2025: Before Justice Mohd Yousuf Wani; matter heard at length and listed as item No. 1 for January 29, 2026.
- February 5, 2026: Listed for final hearing before Justice Rajesh Sekhri on the single bench.
- February 23, 2026: Before Justice Mohammad Yousuf Wani via virtual mode; arguments from both sides completed and order reserved. Both parties granted one week to file written synopses.

Malik's counsel, led by Senior Advocate Rahul Pant (assisted by Sheikh Shakeel Ahmed, Appu Singh Slathia, M. Zulkarnain Chowdhary, and others), argues the detention lacks evidence and stems from bias. The government maintains the action was necessary for public safety.

In a related case, on October 23, 2025, Justice Vinod Chatterji Koul quashed the PSA detention of Malik's aide, Mohammad Rafi alias Pinka, citing vague grounds.

== Impact ==
The arrest prevented Malik from attending the assembly session and Rajya Sabha polls; he voted via postal ballot. AAP formed a 10-member legal team on September 14 to challenge the detention. The case has fueled debates on PSA's misuse against elected officials post-Article 370 abrogation.

As of March 2026, Malik remains in custody. The High Court reserved its order on February 23, 2026, following completion of arguments from both sides before Justice Mohammad Yousuf Wani. J&K Deputy Chief Minister Surinder Chaudhary publicly expressed hope that the judiciary would deliver justice in Malik's case, drawing a parallel with the detention of climate activist Sonam Wangchuk.

== See also ==
- Mehraj Malik
- Doda Assembly constituency
