= Ghulam Hussain =

Ghulam Hussain (Arabic: غلام حسین) is a male Muslim given name. In Persian-language use it is usually transliterated as Gholam Hossein. It may refer to:

== People ==
- Ghulam Husain Salim (died 1817), Indian historian of Bengal
- Ghulam Hussain Khan (1727/28–1797/98), Indian historian during the Mughal era and author of Seir Mutaqherin, (also rendered Siyar-ul-Mutakherin)
- Ghulam Hussain Khan of Malerkotla, ruler of the Indian princely state of Malerkotla
- Badruddin Ghulam Hussain Miya Khan Saheb, founder of the Atba-e-Malak Badar branch of Mustaali Ismaili Shi'a Islam
- Gholamhossein Gheybparvar (1962–2025), Iranian military officer
- Ghulam Hussain Hidayatullah (1879–1948), politician from Sindh, Pakistan
- Maharaj Ghulam Hussain Kathak (1905–2001), Pakistani classical dancer
- Gholam-Hossein Naghshineh (1908–1996), Iranian actor
- Gholamhossein Mosaheb (1910–1979), Iranian mathematician
- Gholam-Hossein Banan (1911–1986), Iranian musician
- Gholam Hossein Sadighi (1905–1992), Iranian politician
- Qolamhossein Bigjekhani (1918–1987), Iranian musician and tar player
- Gholamhossein Bigdeli (1919–1998), Iranian political and literary figure
- Gholam Hossein Jahanshahi (1920–2005), Iranian politician
- Ghulam Hussain Chaudry (1926–1971), Pakistan Army officer
- Gholamhossein Ebrahimi Dinani (born 1934), Iranian philosopher
- Gholam-Hossein Sa'edi (1936–1985), Iranian writer
- Ghulam Hussain (politician) (born 1936), Pakistani medical practitioner and politician
- Gholam Hossein Amirkhani (born 1939), Iranian calligrapher
- Gholamhossein Farzami (1945–2025), Iranian footballer
- Gholamhussein Lotfi (born 1949), Iranian actor, film director and screenwriter
- Gholam Hossein Mazloumi (1950–2014), Iranian footballer
- Gholamhossein Karbaschi (born 1954), Iranian politician
- Gholam-Hossein Nozari (born 1954), Iranian politician
- Gholam Hossein Nuri (born 1954), Iranian painter and director
- Gholam Hossein Peyrovani (born 1955), Iranian footballer
- Gholam-Hossein Mohseni-Eje'i (born 1956), Iranian lawyer and politician
- Gholam-Hossein Elham (born 1959), Iranian politician
- Golam Hossain (Bangladeshi politician)

== Places ==
- Gholam Hoseyn Kandi, village in Ardabil Province
- Mowtowr-e Gholam Hoseyn Kuhestani, village in Kerman Province
- Chah-e Gholamhoseyn, village in Kerman Province
- Gholam Hoseyn-e Hafezi, village in Khuzestan Province
- Chegarman-e Gholamhoseyn, village in Khuzestan Province
- Kalateh-ye Molla Gholamhoseyn, village in North Khorasan Province
