= Ghulam Murtaza =

Ghulam Murtaza (Arabic: غلام مرتضى) is a male Muslim given name. It may refer to

- Ghulam Murtaza Shah Syed, known as G. M. Syed (1904–1995), Pakistani political leader who pioneered the Jeay Sindh movement
- Ghulam Murtaza (cricketer) (born 1980), Pakistani cricketer
- Ghulam Murtaza (physicist) (born 1939), Pakistani plasma physicist and mathematician
- Golam Mortaza (cricketer) (born 1980), Bangladeshi cricketer
- Hafiz Ghulam Murtaza, 17th-century Indian scholar and Sufi saint
- Mirza Ghulam Murtaza (died 1876), Indian nobleman, military man and father of Mirza Ghulam Ahmad
- Ghulam Murtaza Khan (1760–1840), Indian painter

== See also ==
- Ghulam (disambiguation)
- Ghulam, Arabic male given name
- Murtaza, Arabic male given name
