= Samdani =

Samdani is a Muslim surname of Arabic origin that is found in Afghanistan, Bangladesh and Pakistan.

Notable people with the name include:

- Abdur Rahman Samdani (1886–1925), Kashmiri diplomat and journalist
- Rajeeb Samdani (born 1974), Bangladeshi industrialist and founder of Samdani Art Foundation
- Khwaja Muhammad Ahmad Samdani (1932–2013), Pakistani judge
- Shakeel Ahmed Samdani (1961–2012), Indian academic
- Nurunnabi Samdani, Bangladeshi Islamic scholar and politician

== Ghulam Samdani ==
- Golam Samdani Quraishy (1929–1991), Bangladeshi poet and scholar
- Golam Samdani Fakir (born 1952), vice-chancellor of the Green University of Bangladesh

== See also ==
- Ghulam
