= Ghulam Murshid (disambiguation) =

Ghulam Murshid (Bengali: গোলাম মোর্শেদ; transliterations vary), meaning "Servant of the Murshid", is a Bengali masculine given name of Arabic origin. Notable bearers of the name include;

- Golam Morshed Farooqi (1930–2014), politician and journalist
- Ghulam Murshid (born 1940), author
- Kazi Golam Morshed, politician

== See also ==
- Ghulam
- Golam Helal Morshed Khan, Bangladeshi major general
