= Dastgir =

Dastgir (pronounced dɑʂt-ģir, Persian pronunciation: [ˈdɑst.ɡiːɾ]) from Persian, literally 'Holder of the Hand') is a name common in South Asia and the Middle East. In Arabic, it is used as a first name and means 'helper' or 'supporter'. In Pashto and Persian, it means 'saint' or 'the saint of saints' and can be used as a title, a name, or an ethnic surname. The suffix zâda or zâdeh (Persian for 'son of') is sometimes added in the Persian and Pashto variations to denote 'son or descendant of a saint'.

It was popularly used to refer to one saint in particular from the region, Shaykh Abdul Qadir Gillani, founder of the Qadiri Sufi order. It is often said the term itself arose with him, since he had the title al-Gauth al Azam (the 'Supreme Helper'), and the root of Dastgir literally denotes a helper or helping hand.

In Afghanistan and Pakistan, Dastgir is common amongst the Pashtuns. As a surname it is often mated to Ghulam or Amir as first names. Ghulam Dastgir meaning 'servant of the saint(s)' and Amir Dastgir meaning 'command of the saints' or 'commander of the saints' (the latter just emphasizing the original meaning, 'saint of saints') or simply 'princely saint'. The former is most likely popular in South Asia due to the cultural importance that saints such as Sufis and other Islamic scholars and/or mystics had in society. Concordantly, Dastgir is usually encountered as an ethnic surname passed down through generations that had some link to a saint. Its use as a title or even first name (barring the Arabic version) has diminished with the cultural shift away from an age where saints were prominent. Its usage in Iran probably follows a similar history, since many of the Sufi saints of renown in the region were initially from Iran. In Punjab, Pir Dastgir and Ghaus ul Azam are synonymous with Shaikh Abdul Qadir Jilani and the name Ghulam Dastgir and Ghulam Ghaus in Punjabi Muslim's context means 'servant/follower of Shaikh Abdul Qadir Jilani', the reason for this is that most of Punjabi Muslim sufi saints belonged to the Qadri branch of Sufis.

== Sikh scripture ==
The term is used quite a bit in Sikh scripture to describe Allah, the Creator, God, etc. as the one who holds the hand of the devotee.

From Sri Guru Granth Sahib:

ਦਸ੍ਤਗੀਰੀ ਦੇਹਿ ਦਿਲਾਵਰ ਤੂਹੀ ਤੂਹੀ ਏਕ ॥

dhastageeree dheh dhilaavar toohee toohee ek ||

دستگیِریِ دےه دلاور تُوهیِ تُوهیِ اےک ۔۔

दस्तगीरी देहि दिलावर तूही तूही एक ॥

Give me Your help, O brave and generous One; You are the One, You are the Only One.

From Sri Dasam Granth Sahib:

ਅਮਾਬਖ਼ਸ਼ੋਬਖ਼ਸ਼ਿੰਦਓਦਸਤਗੀਰ॥

amaa bakhhasho bakhhashi(n)dh o dhastageer ||

اما بخشو بخشںد او دستگیِر ۔۔

अमा बख़शो बख़शिंद ओ दसतगीर ॥

He is the Protector and Helper.

== Sources and references ==
- Persian: http://www.babynamesworld.com/meaning_of_Dastgir.html
- Arabic: http://www.weddingvendors.com/baby-names/meaning/dastgir/
