= Ghulam Dastagir =

Ghulam Dastagir (Persian: غلام دستگیر; transliterations vary), meaning "Servant of Dastgir", is a male Muslim given name popular in Afghanistan, Bangladesh and Pakistan. Notable bearers of the name include;

- Ghulam Dastagir Shaida (1916–1970), Afghan singer and musician
- Quazi Golam Dastgir (1932–2008), Bangladesh army officer and diplomat
- Ghulam Dastagir Alam (born 1933), Pakistani theoretical physicist
- Ghulam Dastagir Birajdar (1924–2021), Indian Sanskrit scholar
- Ghulam Dastagir Panjsheri (born 1933), Afghan politician
- Ghulam Dastagir (wrestler) (born 1945), Afghan wrestler
- Golam Dastagir Gazi (born 1948), Bangladeshi industrialist and minister
- Ghulam Dastagir Azad, Afghan politician
- Ghulam Dustgir Khan (born 1986), British-Pakistani comedian
- Ghulam Dastagir (died 2003), Indian railway official who saved many lives in Bhopal disaster on 3 December 1984

== See also ==
- Ghulam
