= Ghulam Ghawth =

Ghulam Ghawth (transliterations vary) is a Muslim masculine given name.

Notable people with the name include:

- Ghulam Ghaus Hazarvi (1896–1981), Pakistani Islamic scholar and politician
- Golam Gauss (born 1969), Bangladeshi footballer
- Ghulam Ghaus Khan (died 2005), Pakistani freedom fighter
- Ghulam Ghous, Pakistani academic
- Ghulam Ghaus (Afghan politician), Afghan politician
- Ghulam Ghaus, Indian politician

== See also ==
- Ghulam
