= Ghulam Mawla =

Ghulam Mawla (Bengali: গোলাম মওলা; transliterations vary), meaning "Servant of the Master", is a Bengali masculine given name of Arabic origin. Notable bearers of the name include;

- Golam Moula (1920–1967), doctor and activist
- Golam Maula Rony (born 1967), politician and businessman
- Golam Mawla, politician

== See also ==
- Ghulam
- Mawla
- Abd al-Mawla Naqi
