= Ghulami (disambiguation) =

Ghulami is a 1985 Indian Hindi-language action-drama film directed by J.P. Dutta, starring Dharmendra, Mithun Chakraborty and Naseeruddin Shah.

Ghulami may also refer to:

== Films ==
- Ghulami (1945 film), an Indian drama film of 1945 by Mohan Wadhwani, starring David Abraham, Mumtaz Begum and Renuka Devi
- Ghulami (1985 Punjabi film), a British-Pakistani Punjabi-language drama film by Hasnain
- Ghulami (2015 film), a 2015 Indian Bhojpuri -language action film by Tinnu Verma, starring Dinesh Lal Yadav and Madhu Sharma

== People ==
- Najieh Ghulami, a presenter for BBC Persian Television

== See also ==
- Ghulam (disambiguation)
- Gholami (disambiguation)
