= 1997 elections in India =

Elections in India
← 1996	1997	1998 →

Elections in the Republic of India in 1997 included, the 1997 Punjab Legislative Assembly election, elections to seats in the Rajya Sabha and the elections to the posts of President and vice president.

== Legislative Assembly elections ==
Date(s)	State	Government before election	Chief Minister before election	Government after election	Chief Minister after election	Maps
7 February 1997	Punjab	Indian National Congress	Rajinder Kaur Bhattal	Shiromani Akali Dal	Parkash Singh Badal	
7 February 1997	Punjab	Indian National Congress	Rajinder Kaur Bhattal	Bharatiya Janata Party	Parkash Singh Badal	

=== Punjab ===
Summary of results of the Punjab Legislative Assembly election, 1997
Political Party	No. of Candidates	Seats won	Number of Votes	% of Votes
Shiromani Akali Dal	92	75	38,73,099	37.64%
Bharatiya Janata Party	22	18	8,57,219	8.33%
Indian National Congress	105	14	27,36,346	26.38%
Communist Party of India	15	2	3,07,023	2.86%
Bahujan Samaj Party	67	1	7,69,675	6.37%
Shiromani Akali Dal (M)	30	1	3,19,111	3.10%
Independents	244	6	11,18,348	10.87%
Total	693	117	1,02,89,814	

== Legislative Assembly By-elections ==
=== Jammu and Kashmir ===
Winner, runner-up, voter turnout, and victory margin in every constituency
Assembly Constituency		Turnout	Winner				Runner Up				Margin
#k	Names	%	Candidate	Party	Votes	%	Candidate	Party	Votes	%	Margin
1	Doda	66.08%	Khalid Najeeb	JKNC	23,564	74.36%	Ajay Kumar	BJP	7,789	24.58%	15,775

== President ==
States	No. of MLA/MPs	Value of each Vote	K. R. Narayanan (Votes)	K. R. Narayanan (Values)	T. N. Seshan (Votes)	T. N. Seshan (Values)	Invalid (Votes)	Invalid (Values)
Members of Parliament	776	708	676	478,608	26	18,408	32	22,656
Andhra Pradesh	294	148	254	37,592	9	1,332	17	2,516
Arunachal Pradesh	60	8	56	448	0	0	3	24
Assam	126	116	110	12,760	5	580	1	116
Bihar	324	174	285	49,590	8	1,392	15	2,610
Goa	40	20	35	700	2	40	3	60
Gujarat	182	147	156	22,932	11	1,617	7	1,029
Haryana	90	112	77	8,624	3	336	6	672
Himachal Pradesh	68	51	63	3,213	0	0	2	102
Jammu and Kashmir	87	72	74	5,328	1	72	4	288
Karnataka	224	131	191	25,021	13	1,703	11	1,441
Kerala	140	152	135	20,520	0	0	2	304
Madhya Pradesh	320	130	296	38,480	9	1,170	13	1,690
Maharashtra	288	175	173	30,275	96	16,800	1	175
Manipur	60	18	52	936	4	72	0	0
Meghalaya	60	17	43	731	10	170	4	68
Mizoram	40	8	34	272	2	16	0	0
Nagaland	60	9	55	495	2	18	0	0
Orissa	147	149	132	19,668	0	0	9	1,341
Punjab	117	116	106	12,296	1	116	7	812
Rajasthan	200	129	174	22,446	4	516	12	1,548
Sikkim	32	7	31	217	0	0	0	0
Tamil Nadu	234	176	229	40304	2	352	2	352
Tripura	60	26	59	1534	0	0	0	0
Uttar Pradesh	425	208	377	78,416	24	4,992	7	1,456
West Bengal	294	151	272	41,072	5	755	4	604
Delhi	70	58	58	3,364	3	174	8	464
Pondicherry	30	16	28	448	0	0	1	16
TOTAL	4,848	3,232	4,231	956,290	240	50,631	171	22,656
Source: Election Commission of India.

== Vice president ==
Result of the Indian vice-presidential election, 1997
Candidate	Party	Electoral Votes	% of Votes
Krishan Kant	Janata Dal	441	61.76
Surjit Singh Barnala	SAD	273	38.24
Total		714	100.00
Valid Votes		714	93.95
Invalid Votes		46	6.05
Turnout		760	96.20
Abstentions		30	3.80
Electors		790	
