= Ghulam Sarwar =

Ghulam Sarwar (Persian: غلام سرور; transliterations vary) is a masculine given name of Persian and Arabic origin. Notable people with the name include:

== Given name ==
=== Gholam Sarwar ===
- Ghulam Sarwar Hussaini, Pakistani Sufi and politician

=== Ghulam Sarwar ===
- Ghulam Sarwar (AIMIM politician), Indian politician
- Ghulam Sarwar Teddy (born 1962), Pakistani footballer
- Ghulam Sarwar (writer) (born 1945), British-Bangladeshi writer
- Ghulam Sarwar Cheema, Pakistani politician and military officer
- Ghulam Sarwar Khan (born 1952), Pakistani politician
- Ghulam Sarwar Sr. (1954–2024), Pakistani footballer
- Ghulam-Sarwar Yousof (1939–2022), Malaysian-Punjabi academic and writer

=== Golam Sarwar ===
- Golam Sarwar (1943–2018), Bangladeshi journalist and writer
- Golam Sarwar Hiru (1949–2026), Bangladeshi politician
- Golam Sarwar Milon (1957–2026), Bangladeshi politician
- Golam Sarwar Tipu (born 1945), Bangladeshi footballer
- Golam Sarwar Tuku (born 1970), Bangladeshi politician
- Md. Golam Sarwar, Bangladesh diplomat and secretary general

== See also ==
- Ghulam
- Sarwar
