= Mehraj Malik =

Indian politician (born 1988)

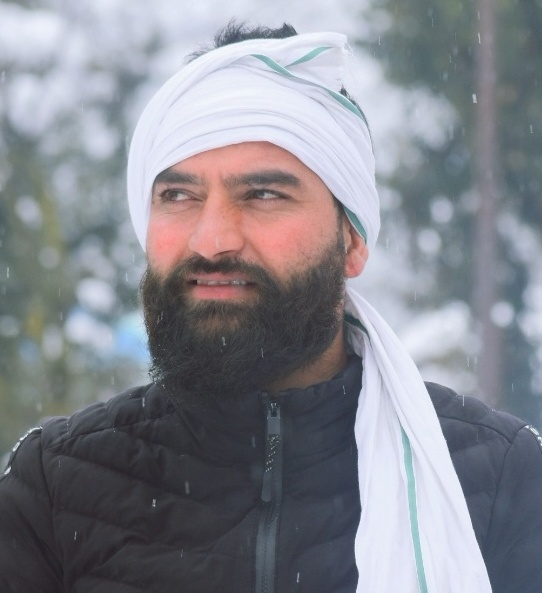
- Mehraj Malik

Member of the Jammu and Kashmir Legislative Assembly
- Incumbent
- Assumed office 8 October 2024
- Chief Minister: Omar Abdullah
- Preceded by: Shakti Raj
- Constituency: Doda

Doda District Development Council councillor
- In office 24 December 2020 – 8 October 2024
- Constituency: Kahara Constituency

Co-chairman of J&K State Coordination Committee Aam Aadmi Party
- In office 17 October 2022 – 21 March 2025
- Preceded by: Post established

State President of Jammu and Kashmir for Aam Aadmi Party
- Incumbent
- Assumed office 21 March 2025
- Preceded by: Post established

Personal details
- Born: Mehraj Din Malik; 1988 (age 37–38) Bhalessa, Jammu and Kashmir
- Party: Aam Aadmi Party
- Education: University of Jammu (M.A in political science), University of Jammu (B.ed)
- Occupation: Politician, social worker
- Profession: Public servant

Mehraj Malik (born in 1988) is an Indian politician and social worker from Jammu and Kashmir. He was elected as a member of legislative assembly (MLA) for the Doda Assembly constituency in October 2024. He was the Aam Aadmi Party's first and only winning MLA candidate in J&K as of 2024. On 17 October 2022, the Aam Aadmi Party appointed him as co-chairman of the J&K State Coordination Committee. On 21 March 2025, Malik was appointed as State President for Aam Aadmi Party in J&K. On 8 September 2025, Malik was arrested under Public Safety Act.

== Political career ==
Mehraj Malik began his political career after joining the AAP in 2013 and ran as an independent candidate in the 2014 Assembly elections. In 2020, he was elected to the Doda District Development Council as an independent candidate with the margin of 3511 votes in Kahara.

After protest against a land eviction drive in Jammu, Mehraj Malik was taken into custody for questioning. The authorities detained Malik due to allegations that he delivered a speech at the location where a violent incident occurred. On 10 February 2023, he was released on bail.

=== Member of the Jammu and Kashmir Legislative Assembly ===
In October 2024, Mehraj Malik became the first member of the Jammu and Kashmir Legislative Assembly from the Aam Aadmi Party (AAP), representing the Doda Assembly constituency. Malik's victory, with a margin of over 4,000 votes, defeating BJP candidate Gajay Singh Rana, marked a breakthrough for AAP in a region historically dominated by the National Conference and BJP.

=== Public Safety Act detention ===
On 8 September 2025, Malik, the sole Aam Aadmi Party (AAP) member of the Jammu and Kashmir Legislative Assembly, was detained under the Public Safety Act (PSA) for a period of one year on grounds of disturbing public order. The detention order (No. 05 of 2025) was issued by the District Magistrate of Doda, Harvinder Singh, who cited Malik's involvement in 18 FIRs and 16 daily diary reports between 2014 and 2025, as well as a recent public confrontation with the Deputy Commissioner over the relocation of a health sub-centre and pending flood-relief payments. Malik was initially lodged in Bhaderwah Jail and later transferred to Kathua District Jail. The detention marked the first instance of a sitting legislator being booked under the PSA in Jammu and Kashmir, prompting criticism from Chief Minister Omar Abdullah, AAP leader Arvind Kejriwal, and several other political figures who described it as an attack on democratic norms.

Malik challenged the detention by filing a habeas corpus petition (HCP No. 139/2025) in the High Court of Jammu and Kashmir and Ladakh at Jammu on 24 September 2025, seeking quashing of the PSA order and ₹5 crore in compensation for alleged violation of fundamental rights. The petition was heard by multiple benches; after partial arguments on 20 November 2025 and 4 December 2025 before Justice Mohd Yousuf Wani, the court marked the case as “part-heard” and scheduled final hearing for 18 December 2025.

On April 27, 2026: In a significant legal development, the Jammu & Kashmir and Ladakh High Court on Monday quashed the preventive detention of Aam Aadmi Party (AAP) MLA Mehraj Malik, who had been detained under the stringent Public Safety Act (PSA), 1978.

The court allowed Malik’s habeas corpus petition, ruling that the detention order issued by the District Magistrate, Doda, could not be sustained in law. The bench observed that the allegations against the MLA at best related to “law and order” issues and did not meet the higher threshold required for invoking “public order” under the PSA.

The matter was heard over several months, and after completion of arguments, the court had reserved its judgment in February 2026.

High Court's Decision

Delivering its verdict on 27 April 2026, the High Court

• Quashed the PSA detention order

• Held that the grounds of detention were legally unsustainable

• Found no sufficient material to justify preventive detention under PSA

• Directed immediate release of the MLA, subject to legal formalities
