= Ghulam Qadir Wani (politician, born 1942) =

Member of Legislative Assembly
- In office 1977–1987
- Preceded by: Hans Raj Dogra
- Succeeded by: Attaullah Suharwardy
- Constituency: Doda

Personal details
- Born: 1942 (age 83–84) Ghat, Doda district
- Party: Janata Party

Ghulam Qadir Wani (born 1942) was a Member of the Legislative Assembly in the then state of Jammu and Kashmir, representing the Doda Assembly constituency.

== Early life and career ==
Ghulam Qadir Wani was the son of Lassa Wani, who previously held the position of MLA for Doda from 1962 to 1972. Ghulam Qadir Wani hailed from Ghat village in Doda district.

Wani succeeded Hans Raj Dogra as a Member of the Legislative Assembly in 1977 and served in this role until 1987 when he was succeeded by Attaullah Suharwardy.

== See also ==
- Doda Assembly constituency
- Jammu and Kashmir Legislative Assembly
