= Ghulam Hassan =

Ghulam Hassan (Arabic: غلام حسن) is a male Muslim given name. It may refer to

- Ghulam Hassan Safi (1902–1984), Afghan politician and diplomat
- Ghulam Hassan Shaggan (born 1928), Pakistani classical singer of the Gwalior Gharana
- Ghulam Hassan Sofi (1932–2009), singer and harmonium player of traditional music of Kashmir
- Ghulam Hassan Khan (born 1936), Indian politician, Jammu and Kashmir
- Ghulam Hassan Pinglana (1939–1998), Indian politician, Jammu and Kashmir
- Ghulam Hassan Lobsang, promoter of Balti language and Balti culture
- Ghulam Hasan, Indian judge
