= Golam Kabir (academic) =

Vice-chancellor of Sheikh Hasina University
- In office 2022 – 14 August 2024
- Preceded by: Rafique Ullah Khan

Personal details
- Education: University of Rajshahi; Banaras Hindu University

Golam Kabir is a Bangladeshi academic and a former vice-chancellor of Netrokona University. He is a former dean of Life and Earth Science Faculty at the University of Rajshahi.

== Early life ==
Kabir did his bachelor's degree and masters at the University of Rajshahi. He did his PhD at the Banaras Hindu University.

== Career ==
Kabir, dean of Life and Earth Science Faculty at the University of Rajshahi, was tasked to investigate violence between Bangladesh Chhatra League and Islami Chhatra Shibir that led to several injuries and death of one Bangladesh Chhatra League activist on campus in February 2010.

On 1 September 2022, Kabir was appointed the vice-chancellor of Sheikh Hasina University. He replaced Subrata Kumar Aditya, treasurer of the university, who had been serving as temporary vice-chancellor of Sheikh Hasina University following the retirement of Rafique Ullah Khan. Since his appointment Kabir has been trying to establish facilities as the current ones are inadequate for the student body for years after the university was established.
