= Ghulam Sadiq =

Ghulam Sadiq (Persian: غلام صادق; transliterations vary) is a Muslim masculine given name.

Notable people with the name include:

- Golam Sadeq, Bangladeshi admiral
- Ghulam Sediq Wardak, Afghan inventor

== See also ==
- Ghulam
- Sadiq
