= Ghulam Akbar =

Ghulam Akbar (Persian: غلام اکبر; transliterations vary) is a Muslim masculine given name.

Notable people with the name include:

- Golam Akbar Khandaker, Bangladeshi politician
- Ghulam Akbar Khan Niazi (born 1937), Pakistani physician
- Ghulam Akbar Lasi (died 2017), Pakistani politician

== See also ==
- Ghulam
- Sadiq
