= Gholami =

Gholami may refer to:

== People ==
- Majid Gholami, Iranian footballer
- Mohammad Gholami, Iranian footballer

== Places ==
- Gholami, Iran, a village in Mazandaran Province, Iran

== See also ==
- Ghulami (disambiguation)
