= Ghulam Haider =

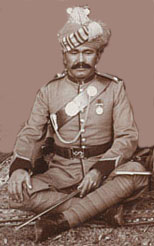
Ghulam Haider

Ghulam Haider (Arabic: غلام حیدر) is a male Muslim given name. Notable people with the name include:

- Bakshi Ghulam Haider (died 1828), Indian soldier
- Ghulam Haider (composer) (1908–1953), Indian/Pakistani composer and music director
- Ghulam Haider Gagroo (1912–1975), Kashmiri poet
- Ghulam Haidar Rasuli (1919–1978), Afghan officer
- Ghulam Haider Hamidi (1945–2011), Afghan politician
- Ghulam Haider Wyne (1950–1993), Pakistani politician
- Ghulam Haider (cricketer) (born 1997), Pakistani cricketer

== See also ==
- Ghulam Haider Khan High School, school in Kabul, Afghanistan
