= Netrokona University =

Public university in Bangladesh

- নেত্রকোনা বিশ্ববিদ্যালয়
- Former name: Sheikh Hasina University (2018-2025)
- Type: Public
- Established: 11 February 2018
- Chancellor: President Mirza Fakhrul Islam Alamgir
- Vice-Chancellor: Professor Dr. Md.Khaleduzzaman
- Faculty: 56 (August 2026)
- Students: 1150 (August 2026)
- Location: Netrokona District, Mymensingh Division, Bangladesh; 24.8956°N 90.7589°E
- Campus: 500 acres (200 ha); Suburban
- Language: Bangla and English
- Website: www.neu.ac.bd

Netrokona University is a public university in Netrokona, Bangladesh. On 30 January 2017, a cabinet meeting chaired by Sheikh Hasina agreed in principle to the acts for the Netrokona University in Netrokona District. The initial plan was to set up a science and technology university in Netrokona, but it was later revised to a general university, offering courses in arts and commerce other than science.

== History ==
After the fall of the Sheikh Hasina-led Awami League government, Sheikh Hasina University was renamed to Netrokona University in February 2025.

== List of vice-chancellors ==
- Rafique Ullah Khan (2018–2022)
- Shubrta Kumer Aditya (In Charge)
- Golam Kabir (2022–14 August 2024)

== Academics ==
=== Faculties and departments ===
The university's 9 departments are organised into 4 faculties.

Faculty	Department
Faculty of Arts	Bangla
Faculty of Arts	English
Faculty of Arts	History and Archeology
Faculty of Social Science	Economics
Faculty of Social Science	International Relations
Faculty of Social Science	Development Studies
Faculty of Engineering & Technology	Computer Science and Engineering
Faculty of Engineering & Technology	Electrical and Electronic Engineering
Faculty of Business Administration	Accounting and Information System
