= Masood Khadarpoosh =

Pakistani activist

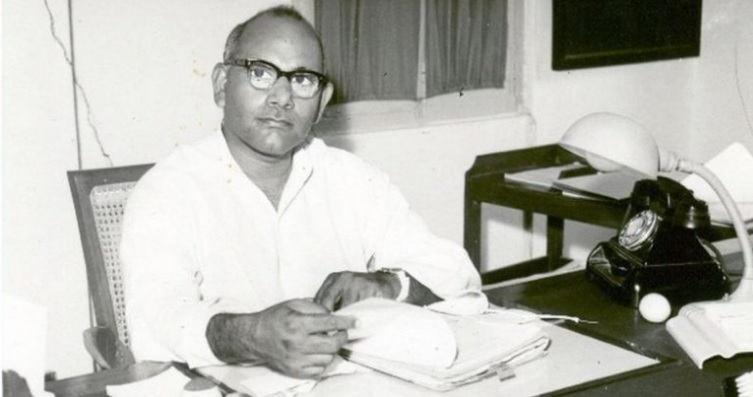
Masood Khadarposh as Deputy Commissioner, Nawabshah (Sindh)

Masood Khaddarposh (25 June 1916, Lahore - 1985) was a Pakistani civil servant, bureaucrat, Pakistan Movement activist, agricultural reformist, Punjabi language promoter. Khadarpoosh joined the Indian Civil Service (later Pakistan civil service) in 1941 and served at various positions before retiring in 1972. He is still remembered as one of the pioneers of agricultural reforms in Pakistan and was a role model for young civil servants due to his uprightness. He was appointed in Sindh. He always wore Khadar – a local simple cotton cloth; consequently, Fatima Jinnah gave him the name Khadar posh, which means a person wearing Khadar.

== Pakistan Movement ==
Khadarpoosh was transferred to Nawabshah as Deputy Commissioner in 1946. His role in the independence struggle was greatly acknowledged when he accompanied Quaid-e-Azam Mohammad Ali Jinnah to Quetta and eventually persuaded the tribal chiefs and the people of Baluchistan to join in with the creation of Pakistan. In 1947, at the time of partition, M. Masud opted for Pakistan and continued at the same post in Nawabshah district of Sindh. Later, he served as deputy commissioner in Muzaffargarh and in board of Revenue, Punjab government, Pakistan.

He was secretary to government of Pakistan at the time of negotiations for Indus Waters Treaty around 1960. He opposed the treaty before signing it. The then President of Pakistan Ayub Khan warned him in a meeting that if he did not shut his mouth, Ayub Khan will push him to the wall and shoot him personally. The controversial IWT was finally signed in Karachi by Ayub Khan and Indian Prime Minister Jawahar Lal Nehru.

== Sindh Hari Committee Report ==
Before 1947, the Sindh government formed a committee, with Sir Roger Thomas as its chairman. Other members included Noordeen Siddique, Masood Khadarposh and Agha Shahi was secretary of committee. Because Masood Khadarpoosh considered the report to be misleading and did not agree with the contents, he wrote a disagreement note. Due to his note and pressure from public, the Pakistan government made land reforms.

== See also ==
- Hakim Ghulam Jilani
