= Kibria =

Kibria (Arabic: كبرياء,; transliterations vary) is a masculine given name of Arabic origin meaning "pride".

Notable people with the name include:

- Mohammad Kibria (1929–2011), artist
- Shah Abu Muhammad Shamsul Kibria (1931–2005), former Finance Minister of Bangladesh
- Amatul Kibria Keya Chowdhury, female politician

== Ghulam Kibria ==
- A. B. Mohammad Ghulam Kibria (died 2014), police officer and government adviser
- Gholam Kibria (1932–2011), former Comptroller and Auditor General of Bangladesh
- Mohammad Golam Kibria (died 1974), politician
- Syed Golam Kibria (1933–1996), journalist and politician
- Golam Kibria Tipu (born 1953), politician
- Golam Kibria (born 1989), cricketer

== See also ==
- Ghulam
