= Sayed Yousuf Mirranay =

Personal details
- Born: 1947 Nangarhar, Afghanistan
- Died: 1979 (aged 31–32) Missing, Afghanistan
- Party: Afghan Social Democratic Party (Afghan Mellat)

Sayed Yousuf Mirranay (Pashto: سيد يوسف ميړنی), was an Afghan political figure and writer. A prominent member of the Afghan Social Democratic Party (Afghan Mellat), he was born in 1947 (1326 Hijra) in the Khogiani district of the Nangarhar province at the foothills of the Spin Ghar Mountains. His father Haji Sayed Jalal belonged to a known family of the Ahmad Khil village in eastern Afghanistan. His vision was the creation of a united, prosperous and a democratically elected government in Afghanistan. He wanted to eradicate division among different class groups and ethnicities. He fought for political freedom and social justice. After the 1978 Saur Revolution, also called the April Revolution or April Coup, Afghan President Mohammed Daoud Khan and most of his family were killed at the presidential palace. In August 1978 Mirranay was also arrested under the communist regime, and was never to be seen again.

== Early life ==
Mirranay, after the completion of his studies in Kaga Primary School, was recognized for his intellect and handpicked to go to Kabul. He pursued his education in Ibn-I- Sina High School and graduated from the Kabul Technical High School in 1965 (1344 Hijri). Soon after graduation, he got a job with Ariana Afghan Airlines and started work in the Kandahar International Airport.

In 1965 the Afghan Social Democratic Party (Afghan Mellat) was established. Yousuf Mirranay was among the first to join. Mirranay, although very young, started his political life by fighting for the realization of his party's ideals. He worked as a public servant in various government departments at the time. He spoke out against corruption and favoritism in the public sector.

Mirranay's struggle for the creation of a just and democratic society in Afghanistan brought him face to face with the regimes of the time in Afghanistan. Mirranay became an unwanted person for the government. He was transferred from one department to another as he himself once wrote, "Apart from the Ministry of Foreign affairs, which was not meant to be for the people like me, I practically served in almost every Department of the Government". He lived a simple life. Although Mirranay was Kabul educated and spent his working life there, he was not impressed by flashy expressions of wealth. He was a modest man. He won the hearts and minds of many Afghans at the time.

== Education ==
Mirranay joined the Institute of Industrial Management and completed his studies. In 1966 he went to Kabul University and studied economics. He remained passionate about writing and literature throughout his life.

== Works ==
Yousuf Mirranay is also known for his academic work. He was fluent in Pashto, Dari and English and has been the author of numerous books and articles on aspects of nationalism, history, literature and culture of the Afghans. From among many of his academic works, only two booklets entitled Nation and Nationality and Culture have been published.

During the late 1960s and throughout the 1970s Mirranay wrote for a number of publications, including the Afghan national newspapers Afghan and Afghan Nation (Afghan Melat). The then-president of Afghanistan, Mohammed Daoud Khan, admired Mirranay's writing. He told the chief newspaper editor of Afghan at the time, Hassan Wolasmal, that he should encourage Mirranay to keep writing and fighting for his ideals.

In 2014, his body of literary work was collated by Yakeen Yousufzai and published in Pashto in a book entitled, The Well of the Hero: Mirranay’s political, social and economic articles.

== Imprisonment and death ==
Mirranay like numerous other members of his party and other supporters of nationalistic and democratic values in Afghanistan was considered a threat to the Communist Government of Afghanistan established after the coup of April 1978. He was imprisoned soon after the coup but was released after a short period. In August 1978 he was imprisoned for the second time, never to be seen again.

== Political legacy ==
Mirranay's writing was based on his understanding of his society, his people and the Afghan culture Mirranay believed that a lack of a truly democratic and strong central government in Afghanistan could jeopardize the independence and sovereignty of the country. To achieve such a goal, he believed that he had to fight what he saw as the reactionary and autocratic regimes of the time inside Afghanistan.

Mirranay even in his young age envisaged the dangers of imported ideologies for the country and warned about international conspiracies. He travelled to every province, many villages and mosques and warned the people not to remain indifferent to what was happening in their country. Mirranay was strongly of the opinion that creation of a united, strong and prosperous Afghanistan is possible only if people of all ethnic backgrounds in the country are given the opportunity of participating in the social, political and economic life of the Afghan society

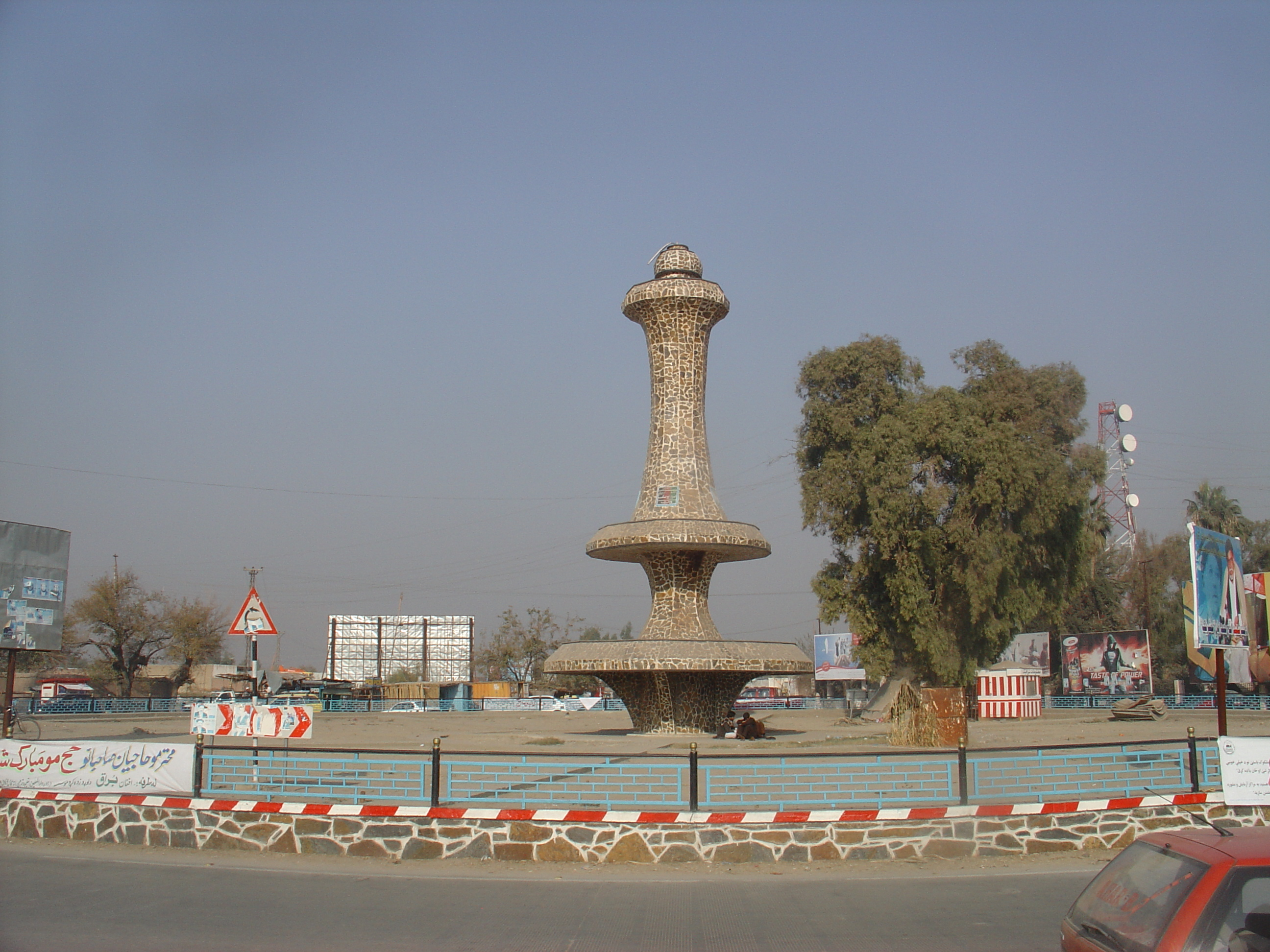
Named in his honour a traffic intersection, Sayed Yousuf Mirranay Choke, Jalalabad, Afghanistan, commissioned by the Government of Afghanistan in Jan 2010

In January 2010, Afghanistan's Government honoured him as a national hero, with a memorial at the main traffic intersection in Jalalabad. It is known as the Shaheed Sayed Yousuf Mirranay Choke in Jalalabad city, Afghanistan. The ceremony was attended by senior government officials.

In 2013, a new foundation was opened in Mirranay's honour. The foundation called the Shaheed Mirranay Foundation runs a school. It teaches girls and boys English and computer literacy, and also provides humanitarian aid to the war-torn communities in Afghanistan.

In 2014, in the book The Well of the Hero a tribute to Mirranay was written by scholar and historian, Professor Habibullah Rafi in which he noted Mirranay's struggle for social justice and ethnic diversity under one unified democratic government. Professor Rafi also recounted how he and Mirranay set up an education foundation called Afghan Youth. Rafi said his last encounter shortly before Mirranay was arrested and disappeared in a bookshop in August 1978.

In the same book, another tribute was given by Mohammad Sediq Patman, former Afghan Deputy Education Minister under Karzai government. The tribute was based on a speech that Patman delivered on 8, May 2014 in Jalalabad. He described Mirranay as a leader of the Afghan Mellat movement who sacrificed his life for the cause, a true patriot and honest leader. Patman said Mirranay was his role model both politically and personally. “He was my teacher and role model. My sincere advice is for everyone to treat Mirranay as their role model and a symbol for unity and democratic values in Afghanistan.”

== Personal life ==
After Mirranay was arrested and believed to be killed, his family were among the first refugees to flee to Pakistan in the 1980s. His brother Syed Gulam Farooq Mirranay is an Afghan political and social reformer and politician, who was an elected member of the House of the People or Wolesi Jirga in 2005 and is the official spokesperson for the Afghan Social Democratic Party (Afghan Mellat).

Sayed Yousuf Mirranay had another brother, Sayed Sheerin Mirranay, who was also imprisoned in 1978 and also disappeared whilst incarcerated.

Sayed Yousuf Mirranay's wife and four children moved to Australia in 1991. They have resided in Australia since the early 1990s. His eldest son, Said Khushal Mirranay, is a physician and a well-known and respected figure in the Afghan Australian community.
