= Doda Assembly constituency =

Constituency of the Jammu and Kashmir Legislative Assembly

Coordinates: 33.145°N 75.545°E

Doda
- Constituency No. 52 for the Jammu and Kashmir Legislative Assembly

Constituency details
- Country: India
- State: Jammu and Kashmir
- District: Doda
- Lok Sabha constituency: Udhampur
- Established: 1962
- Total electors: 98,582
- Reservation: None

Member of Legislative Assembly
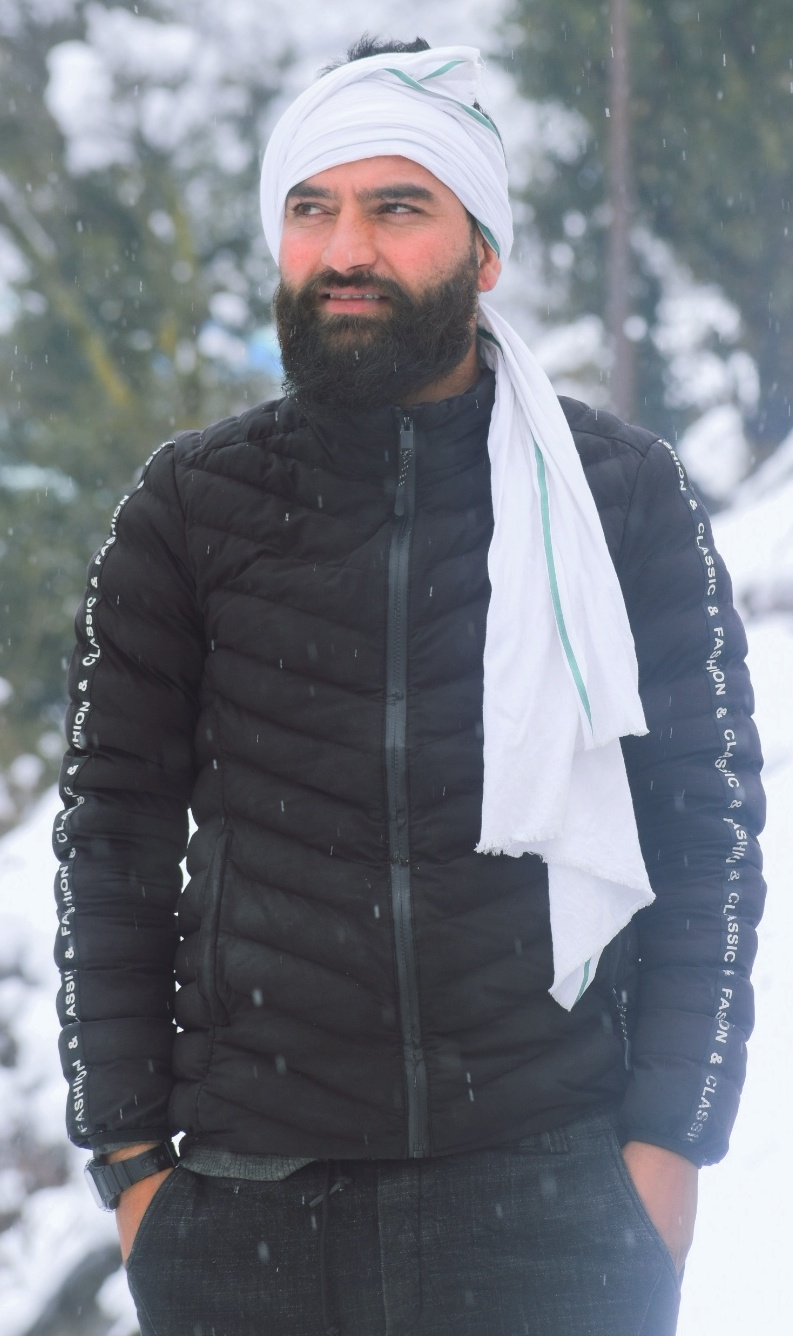
- Incumbent Mehraj Malik
- Party: AAP
- Elected year: 2024

Doda Assembly constituency is one of the 90 constituencies in the Jammu and Kashmir Legislative Assembly of Jammu and Kashmir a north state of India. Doda is also part of Udhampur Lok Sabha constituency.

Most Successful parties from Doda Vidhan Sabha
1. Indian National Congress (3 Times) (52.0%)
2. Jammu &Kashmir National Conference (3 Times) (30.0%)
3. Janata Party (1 Time) (6.00%)
4. Bharatiya Janata Party (1 Time) (6.00%)
5. Aam Aadmi Party (1 Time) (6.00%)
6. 0.00%
7. 0.00%
8. 0.00%

== Members of the Legislative Assembly ==
Election	Member	Party
1962	Lassa Wani	Jammu & Kashmir National Conference
1967	Lassa Wani	Indian National Congress
1972	Hans Raj Dogra	Indian National Congress
1977	Ghulam Qadir Wani	Janata Party
1983	Result with held by Jammu and Kashmir High Court	
1987	Attaullah Sohrawardi	Jammu & Kashmir National Conference
1996	Maulana Attaullah Suharwardy	Jammu & Kashmir National Conference
1997 By-election	Khalid Najeeb	Jammu & Kashmir National Conference
2002	Abdul Majid Wani	Independent
2008	Abdul Majid Wani	Indian National Congress
2014	Shakti Raj Parihar	Bharatiya Janata Party
2024	Mehraj Malik	Aam Aadmi Party

== Election results ==
=== Assembly Election 2024 ===
2024 Jammu and Kashmir Legislative Assembly election : Doda
Party	Candidate	Votes	%	±%
AAP	Mehraj Malik	23,228	31.83%	New
BJP	Gajay Singh Rana	18,690	25.61%	▼11.02
JKNC	Khalid Najib Suharwardy	13,334	18.27%	▼6.2
DPAP	Abdul Majid Wani	10,027	13.74%	New
INC	Sheikh Riaz Ahmed	4,170	5.71%	▼24.89
JKPDP	Mansoor Ahmed Batt	1,359	1.86%	▼1.42
Independent	Bilal Khan	618	0.85%	New
NOTA	None of the Above	822	1.13%	▲0.03
Margin of victory		4,538	6.22%	▲0.20
Turnout		72,980	74.03%	▼5.31
Registered electors		98,582		▲16.60
AAP gain from BJP		Swing	▼4.80	

=== Assembly Election 2014 ===
2014 Jammu and Kashmir Legislative Assembly election : Doda
Party	Candidate	Votes	%	±%
BJP	Shakti Raj Parihar	24,572	36.63%	▲31.35
INC	Abdul Majid Wani	20,532	30.61%	▼13.94
JKNC	Khalid Najib Suharwardy	16,416	24.47%	▼6.38
JKPDP	Shahab Ul Haq	2,201	3.28%	▲0.77
Independent	Nuzhat Iqbal Zargar	803	1.20%	New
Independent	Daya Krishan	410	0.61%	New
NOTA	None of the Above	735	1.10%	New
Margin of victory		4,040	6.02%	▼7.68
Turnout		67,084	79.34%	▲6.30
Registered electors		84,548		▲18.32
BJP gain from INC		Swing	▼7.92	

=== Assembly Election 2008 ===
2008 Jammu and Kashmir Legislative Assembly election : Doda
Party	Candidate	Votes	%	±%
INC	Abdul Majid Wani	23,254	44.55%	▲43.39
JKNC	Khalid Najib Suharwardy	16,102	30.85%	▼2.89
BJP	Ishtiaq Ahmed Wani	2,756	5.28%	▼5.69
Independent	Mohammed Ali Shokeen	2,322	4.45%	New
SP	Ghulam Qadir Wani	2,142	4.10%	New
JKPDP	Attaullah Khan	1,310	2.51%	▼12.20
Independent	Chuni Lal Thakur	903	1.73%	New
Margin of victory		7,152	13.70%	▲12.15
Turnout		52,196	73.05%	▲17.51
Registered electors		71,457		▲1.48
INC gain from Independent		Swing	▲9.26	

=== Assembly Election 2002 ===
2002 Jammu and Kashmir Legislative Assembly election : Doda
Party	Candidate	Votes	%	±%
Independent	Abdul Majid Wani	13,799	35.29%	New
JKNC	Khalid Najib Soharawardy	13,192	33.74%	▼40.62
JKPDP	Ghulam Qadir Wani	5,753	14.71%	New
BJP	Swami Raj	4,289	10.97%	New
JD(U)	Nazir Ahmed Mir	598	1.53%	New
INC	Mukand Ram	456	1.17%	New
Independent	Kesri Shashi Kumar	371	0.95%	New
Margin of victory		607	1.55%	▼48.23
Turnout		39,104	55.54%	▼10.54
Registered electors		70,413		▲46.83
Independent gain from JKNC		Swing	▼39.07	

=== Assembly By-election 1997 ===
1997 Jammu and Kashmir Legislative Assembly by-election : Doda
Party	Candidate	Votes	%	±%
JKNC	Khalid Najeeb	23,564	74.36%	▲30.62
BJP	Ajay Kumar	7,789	24.58%	New
Margin of victory		15,775	49.78%	▲32.70
Turnout		31,689	66.08%	▲3.01
Registered electors		47,956		▲0.00
JKNC hold		Swing		

=== Assembly Election 1996 ===
1996 Jammu and Kashmir Legislative Assembly election : Doda
Party	Candidate	Votes	%	±%
JKNC	Maulana Attaullah Suharwardy	13,230	43.74%	▼48.72
JD	Ghulam Qadir Wani	8,065	26.66%	New
BJP	Kulbushan	7,152	23.65%	▲22.23
INC	Muzaffer Hussain Baig	1,185	3.92%	New
Independent	Shashi Kumar	362	1.20%	New
Margin of victory		5,165	17.08%	▼70.97
Turnout		30,246	64.50%	▼14.61
Registered electors		47,956		▲17.84
JKNC hold		Swing	▼48.72	

=== Assembly Election 1987 ===
1987 Jammu and Kashmir Legislative Assembly election : Doda
Party	Candidate	Votes	%	±%
JKNC	Attaullah Sohrawardi	29,232	92.46%	New
LKD	Chuni Lal	1,395	4.41%	New
BJP	Parmanand	447	1.41%	New
Margin of victory		27,837	88.05%	
Turnout		31,615	78.05%	▲77.68
Registered electors		40,697		▲
JKNC gain from Independent		Swing		

=== Assembly Election 1983 ===
1983 Jammu and Kashmir Legislative Assembly election : Doda
Party	Candidate	Votes	%	±%
Independent	Result with heal by Jammu and Kashmir High Court	Unopposed		
Registered electors		1		▼100.00
Independent gain from JP		Swing		

=== Assembly Election 1977 ===
1977 Jammu and Kashmir Legislative Assembly election : Doda
Party	Candidate	Votes	%	±%
JP	Ghulam Qadir Wani	5,342	39.02%	New
JKNC	Attaullah Sohrawardi	4,384	32.02%	New
INC	Mohammed Akbar Kichloo	1,202	8.78%	▼31.09
Independent	Lal Chand	763	5.57%	New
Independent	Himat Singh	752	5.49%	New
JI	Saidullah Tantray	694	5.07%	▼7.95
Independent	Ghulam Mohammed	439	3.21%	New
Margin of victory		958	7.00%	▼1.05
Turnout		13,691	48.42%	▲1.86
Registered electors		29,026		▲8.51
JP gain from INC		Swing	▼0.85	

=== Assembly Election 1972 ===
1972 Jammu and Kashmir Legislative Assembly election : Doda
Party	Candidate	Votes	%	±%
INC	Hans Raj Dogra	4,833	39.87%	▼13.39
Independent	Ghulam Qadir Wani	3,857	31.82%	New
JI	Saidullah Tantray	1,578	13.02%	New
Independent	Amina Begum	979	8.08%	New
ABJS	Swami Raj	777	6.41%	▼9.08
Independent	Jaswant Singh	97	0.80%	New
Margin of victory		976	8.05%	▼13.96
Turnout		12,121	46.50%	▲3.32
Registered electors		26,750		▲8.84
INC hold		Swing	▼13.39	

=== Assembly Election 1967 ===
1967 Jammu and Kashmir Legislative Assembly election : Doda
Party	Candidate	Votes	%	±%
INC	Lassa Wani	5,497	53.26%	New
JKNC	Mohammed Akbar Kichloo	3,225	31.25%	▼58.12
ABJS	A. R. Sheikh	1,599	15.49%	New
Margin of victory		2,272	22.01%	▼56.72
Turnout		10,321	43.19%	▼26.96
Registered electors		24,578		▼6.20
INC gain from JKNC		Swing	▼36.11	

=== Assembly Election 1962 ===
1962 Jammu and Kashmir Legislative Assembly election : Doda
Party	Candidate	Votes	%	±%
JKNC	Lassa Wani	16,146	89.37%	New
Independent	Abdul Rehman	1,921	10.63%	New
Margin of victory		14,225	78.73%	
Turnout		18,067	70.78%	
Registered electors		26,202		
JKNC win (new seat)				

== See also ==
- Doda
- Doda West
- List of constituencies of the Jammu and Kashmir Legislative Assembly
