= Kas Ali Mirzayi =

Kas Ali Mirzayi کسعلی میرزایی
- Village
- Country: Iran
- Province: Lorestan
- County: Kuhdasht
- Bakhsh: Central
- Rural District: Kuhdasht-e Shomali

Population (2006)
  - Total: 54
- Time zone: UTC+3:30 (IRST)
  - Summer (DST): UTC+4:30 (IRDT)

Kas Ali Mirzayi (Persian: کسعلی میرزایی, also Romanized as Kas ʿAlī Mīrzāyī; also known as Gholām ʿAli) is a village in Kuhdasht-e Shomali Rural District, in the Central District of Kuhdasht County, Lorestan Province, Iran. At the 2006 census, its population was 54, in 10 families.
