= Ghulam Nabi Kelay =

Village in Helmand Province, Afghanistan

Ghulām Nabī Kêlay غلام نبی کلی
- Village
- Interactive map of Ghulām Nabī Kêlay
- Coordinates: 30°44′33″N 64°7′9″E
- Country: Afghanistan
- Province: Helmand Province
- Time zone: + 4.30

Ghulām Nabī Kêlay (Persian: غلام نبی کلی) is a village in Helmand Province, in southwestern Afghanistan.

== See also ==
- Helmand Province
