= Gholamreza Khoshroo Kurdieh =

Iranian serial killer (1965-1997)

- Born: Gholamreza Khoshroo Kuran Kurdieh غلامرضا خوشرو کوران کردیه; 1 December 1965; Faruj, North Khorasan, Iran
- Died: 22 August 1997 (aged 31); Tehran, Iran
- Cause of death: Execution by hanging
- Other names: "The Night Bat" "Tehran Vampire"
- Conviction: Murder x9
- Penalty: Death

Details
- Victims: 9
- Span of crimes: April – June 1997
- Country: Iran
- Date apprehended: 22 July 1997

Gholamreza Khoshroo Kuran Kurdieh (Persian: غلامرضا خوشرو کوران کردیه; 1 December 1965 – 22 August 1997) was an Iranian serial killer known as the Night Bat.

He began his crime spree with thefts and rapes in Tehran in 1992. He was arrested, but escaped, before being arrested again in 1997 and executed for nine murders. In court, he only confessed to a single case of car theft and stolen property.

== Biography ==
On 1 December 1965, Kurdieh was born in Faruj a city in Khorasan north Iran. He got married in Tehran, but following a disturbance, separated from his wife and returned to North Khorasan. He was arrested in 1982 on robbery charges in Nishapur, and was subsequently detained for allegedly spying on behalf of the Soviet Union.

Kurdieh eventually returned to Tehran, and began his murder spree. While wearing all-black, he stole a taxi. After picking up young girls and women, he would drag them into the wilderness, where he would rape, assault and eventually kill them, burning the bodies afterwards.

He was arrested several times, but repeatedly deceived the authorities by giving them different names. In 1992, after several young girls complained that two men stole their money and raped them, the police launched an extensive investigation. After several days of pursuit, they arrested the perpetrators after an armed conflict. The two perpetrators, Ali Karimi and Gholamreza Kurdieh, who identified himself as "Murad Naderi", confessed to multiple cases of rape and armed robbery in interrogations.

Gholamreza Kurdieh fled the same year he went to court. His accomplice Ali Karimi was hanged in March of that year.

== Murders ==
- On 13 April 1997, with the discovery of a 54-year-old woman in front of Chitgar Park in Tehran, the police began their criminal investigation to discover the killer.
- On 16 April 1997, a burning corpse was discovered in a garden in Karaj. The coroner diagnosed the cause of death to be knife blows to the neck and chest, and that the burning was caused after death. The body belonged to a woman named A'diah.
- On 31 April 1997, the burning body of a 43-year-old woman was discovered on the road of a construction site in Tehran's Farahzad. Forensics determined the death was the result of a neck rupture.
- On 2 June 1997, a burnt body was discovered in Tehran's Evin District. The cause of death according to the coroners were knife blows to the chest and neck. The victim was 24-year-old Elaha Hematinejad, who went to a hospital in Chamran to see her sister and died the same night she returned home.
- In May 1997, Tehran policemen discovered two burned bodies on the Bakeri Expressway. According to the coroner, the victims were killed prior to being burned. The older victim, Azam Sabtnzhad, was stabbed 27 times, while her 10-year-old daughter, Munira Kafchi, had been strangled.
- On 14 June 1997, the burned corpse of a female student was discovered in West Tehran. The hands and feet of the victim were broken and the cause of death was burning. The victim was a fifth-year student at the Hamadan Dental School.
- On 10 June 1997, the burnt corpse of a 55-year-old woman was discovered on a highway near a construction site in West Tehran.

== Arrest ==
Gholamreza Khoshroo Kuran Kurdieh was arrested in the Punak area of West Tehran's 10th district on 22 July 1997. After his transfer, it was revealed that he had killed the girls and young women.

At first, the true identity of Kurdieh was unclear, and because of this, he was referred to by his nickname in the press. On a television broadcast, the police chief of Tehran falsely claimed that the killer was an Afghan citizen. However, when Kurdieh's picture was published in the newspapers, Gholamreza Khoshro, a relative of his, provided a birth certificate to the Iranian newspaper, identifying his relative Kurdieh.

Kurdieh never confessed to the murders. He claimed that his accomplice, Hamid Rasuli, killed the women.

Meanwhile, Hamid Rasuli, the Interior Ministry's intelligence chief, was sentenced to death for serial murder and issuing orders for two executions, those of Mr. Dariush Forouhar and Ms. Majdas Kandari. It is possible that Rasuli was the Night Bat's accomplice.

== Trial ==
Kurdieh was tried by the Tehran General Court in two trial sessions at Imam Khomeini's Judiciary Complex. His trial was one of the most controversial lawsuits in Iran's history, which severely affected the people. He was charged with nine murders, attempted murder of his youngest niece by placing her in a drawer, escape from the authorities, theft and rape. All stages of the trial, except for the consideration of his actions, were held publicly.

== Execution ==
On 22 August 1997, Kurdieh walked down the canopy while writing on paper: "I am not indebted to anyone, and I am not a creditor and I ask forgiveness for all". After he received 214 lashes, Kurdieh was hanged in a warehouse near the Azadi Stadium.

== See also ==
- List of serial killers by country
