= Gholam Reza Sinambari =

Iranian academic

- Born: Birjand, Iran
- Occupation: University professor

Gholam Reza Sinambari (Persian: غلامرضا سینمبری, born in Birjand, Iran) is an Iranian engineer and university professor.

He moved to Germany and studied there. He is a professor at the Department of Environmental Engineering at the Fachhochschule Bingen (Germany) - University of Applied Sciences.
