= Mir Ghulam Ali =

Mir Ghulam Ali Khan
- Born: Ghulam Ali Khan; 1758; Srirangapatnam, Mysore
- Died: 1863 (aged 105); Krishnagiri, Tamilnadu
- Occupations: Vakil and Ambassador of Tipu Sultan
- Known for: Leading Tipu Sultan's envoy to Ottoman Sultan Salim II and France
- Notable work: Custodians of Tipu Sultan's son

Mir Ghulam Ali Khan was an official and Vakil of Tipu Sultan who was made custodian of Tipu's sons to be handed over to Britishers as ransome for 3 years till the financial terms were fulfilled.

Mir Ghulam Ali khan was the Home Minister of Tippu Sultan. He is said to have led a delegation to Constantinople to the Ottoman Empire, and had also visited France.

After the fall of Tippu Sultan in 1799, Ghulam Ali was arguably pensioned off by the British. According to John Thomas, Mir Ghulam Ali khan was a senior army commander ( Ameer ul Behar) of Mysore, who lived between 1758 and 1863. He died in 1863 at the age of 105 at sanatorium. His body was buried in Shahi Masjid Krishnagiri District, State of Tamil Nadu.

Ghulam Ali Khan was a seasoned diplomat who was the leader of the Mysorean embassy to Turkey and from there on to France and England in 1785 – 1786. He was lame on account of sciatica and a letter from Tipu exists where he sends some oil to apply onto Noor Khan's legs. Even in today's Mysore, Ghulam Ali Khan is called 'power of tippu' or 'The lame Ghulam Ali Khan'.
