= Ghulam Ghous =

Vice Chancellor of the University of Kotli Azad Kashmir

Dr. Ghulam Ghous was the vice chancellor of the University of Kotli Azad Kashmir in the state of Azad Jammu and Kashmir, Pakistan. He got his MBA degree from Quaid e Azam University Islamabad and was a lecturer in Kotli University during 1980's. He had MA Economics degree from Multan University, Pakistan.He went to the UK for a second MS, from Salford University England on Presidential Scholarship. He again went to the UK to obtain his PhD from the University of Hull England in Business Administration & Marketing. He joined Kotli University as chairman from 1996-2000, then he was given responsibility to lead the kotli university campus as a dean from 1999-2004.

In 2004 he got promoted to director of finance and planning of AJK University on 20th grade, served that seat for 10 years (more than anybody in the history of University of (AJ&K). When he assumed the charge of Director Finance & Planning total University budget was Rs. 568.463 million and within some years it was doubled and now university is in sound financial position.

In 2009 he was promoted to grade 22 and on 20 May 2014 he assumed the charge of university of Kotli AJK, Pakistan as founding vice chancellor. He was promoted to professor emeritus on 19 May 2017 by the university senate. He has published more than 30 papers in international journals, which are now used as course work in European universities.

== Research publications ==
- Ghous G. (1997), “Multinational Corporations and Their Role in Developing Countries”, Journal of Islamic Banking and Finance, July –September 1998, pp. 40–51.
- Ghous, G. (1997),”Multinational Vs. Global Corporations”, Politics and Business, August September, Volume III, No. 115, pp. 59–61.
- Ghous, G.(1997), “Standardisation of Marketing Strategies and Economies of Scale”, Politics and Business, December, Volume IV, No. 118 pp.
- Ghous, G.(1997), “Performance Related Pay Schemes: Some Plus Points to consider”, Politics and Business, November, Volume III, No.117, pp 53–55.
- Ghous, G.(1998), “Performance Related Pay (PRP)”, Journal of Islamic Banking and Finance, January–March, Volume 15, No. 1 pp. 7–13.
- Ghous, G. (1998). “Pricing in International Markets: A challenging Job”. Pakistan Economic and Social Review, 36(1), 99–110. Accessed 14 May 2024.
- Ghous, G. (1998), “ Is Standardisation of Marketing Strategies Feasible?”, Marketing Review, January- March, Volume 18, No. 1, pp. 23–25, 58.
- Ghous, G. and Ghayyour, A. A. (1999), “Money and Motivation”, Journal of Islamic Banking and Finance, April–June, Volume 16.
- Ghous, G. (1999), “Issues in Standardisation of Marketing Strategies”, Journal of Social Sciences and Humanities, Allama Iqbal Open University, Autumn.
- Ghous, G. (2001), “Why are products Adapted in foreign Markets?”, Journal of Social Sciences and Humanities, AIOU, Vol. VIII, No. 1 Spring, pp. 121–34.
- Ghous, G. (2002), “Promotional Strategies in Foreign Markets”, Marketing Review, January–March, Volume 22, No.1.
- Ghous, G. (2002), “Distribution Strategies in Foreign Markets”, Pakistan Management Review, Vol.XL.No. 1, First Quarter, pp. 29–37.
- Ghous, G. (2003), “Advertising Strategies and Standardization of Marketing”, Management Scenario, pp. 8–12.

In August 2017, he has completed his tenure as the vice chancellor of Kotli University AJK, Pakistan. Currently he is designated as professor emeritus at University of Kotli AJK, Pakistan.
