= Ghulam Jilani Barq =

Islamic scholar and writer

- Title: Doctor, Allamah

Personal life
- Born: Ghulam Jilani Barq; October 26, 1901 Basal, Attock; Pakistan (1947-till death)
- Died: March 12, 1985 (aged 83–84) Attock
- Home town: Attock
- Occupation: Islamic scholar, theologian, author and translator

Religious life
- Religion: Islam

G̲h̲ulām Jīlānī Barq (Urdu: غلام جیلانی برق; 26 October 1901, Basal, Attock District - 12 March 1985, Attock) was a 20th Century Pakistani Islamic scholar, theologian, educator, scholar, author and translator.

== Early life and education ==
Ghulam Jilani Barq was born on 26 October 1901 in Attock District to Muhammad Qasim Shah. Barq completed his education in his hometown, Attock where he was living with his uncle, his father used to live out of the town due to his official work. From Madrassas to universities, he won gold medal in Arabic language. Barq wrote his thesis on Ibn Taymiyyah in English, which was ratified in 1940 by universities such as Harvard and Oxford. According to Pakistani journalist Javed Chaudhry, Barq was one of the twenty scholars who had Ph.D degree in 1940 before the creation of Pakistan.

== Works ==
Ghulam Jilani Barq has written several books including:

- Imām Ibn-i Taymiyyah (Book on Ibn Taymiyyah)
- Dānish-i Rūmī o Saʻdī (Rumi and Saadi)
- Merī dāstān-i ḥayāt (My life story)
- Yūrap par Islām ke iḥsān (The blessings of Islam on Europe)
- Falsafiyān-i Islām (Philosophy of Islam)
- Ḍākṭar G̲h̲ulām̲ Jīlānī Barq ke k̲h̲ut̤ūt̤ (Letters from Dr. Ghulam Jilani Barq)
- Barq-i betāb: Ḍākṭar G̲h̲ulām̲ Jīlānī Barq kā kalām
- Maz̤āmīn-i Barq: 1926 tā qayām-i Pākistān
- Do Islam
- Do Qurʼān
- Islam, the Religion of Humanity
- Mann Ki Duniya

== Death ==
Barq died on 12 March 1985 in Attock.

== Bibliography ==
- Mājid, Rāja F. M. (1962). Ghulām Jīlānī Barq: a study in Muslim "nationalism" (Ph.D thesis). Canada: McGill University.
- Barq, G̲h̲ulām Jīlānī (1982). My life story (in Urdu). Shaiḵh̲ G̲h̲ulām ʻAlī ainḍ Sanz.
- Barq, Dr. Ghulam Jilani (2011). Imam Ibn Taymiyyah. Lahore: Al-Faisal Nasran. pp. 9–10. ISBN 978-969-503-812-3.
