= Syed Gulam Farooq Mirranay =

Dr. Syed Ghulam Farooq Mirranay
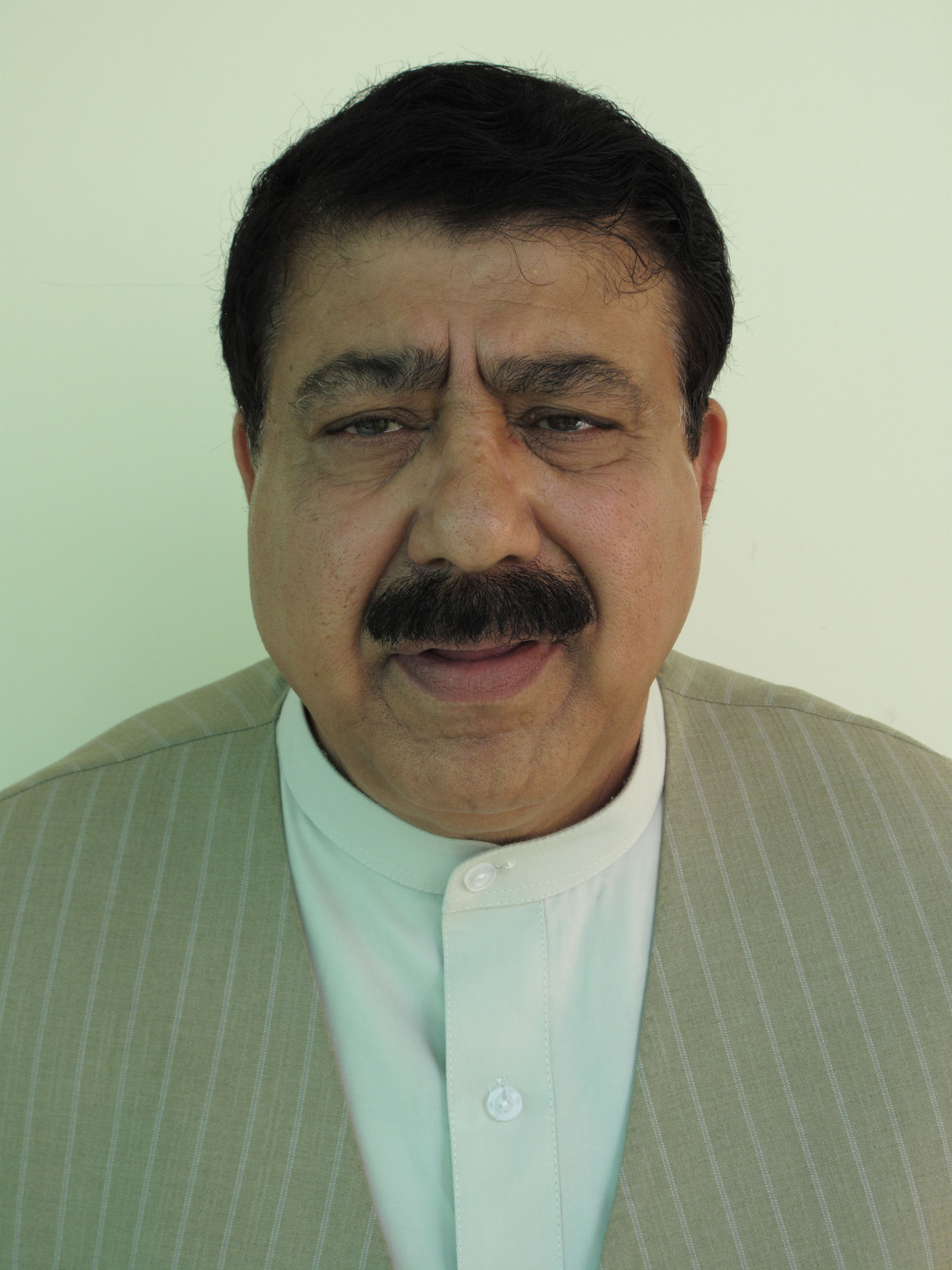

Personal details
- Born: 1950 (age 75–76) Nangarhar, Afghanistan
- Party: Afghan Social Democratic Party (Afghan Mellat)

Dr. Syed Ghulam Farooq Mirranay was born in Nangarhar Province, Afghanistan in 1950. He is a senior member of the Afghan Social Democratic Party (Afghan Mellat) and was an elected member of the House of the People from 2005 to 2010. Mirranay is the official spokesperson for the Afghan Mellat Party and speaks both official Afghanistan languages, Pashto and Dari, as well as English.

Hiss brother, Sayed Yousuf Mirranay, was an Afghan patriot and prominent member of the Afghan Social Democratic Party who disappeared in August 1978 whilst imprisoned by Taraki's communist government.

== Education ==
Dr. Mirranay graduated from Nangarhar Medical School, Kabul University in 1976 and worked as a medical officer in Kunar Province until the 1978 communist coup.

== The Saur Revolution ==
Following the Saur Revolution on 28 April 1978, Dr. Mirranay was imprisoned by Taraki's communist government. Upon his release in 1980, Dr. Mirranay fled Afghanistan to a refugee camp in Peshawar, Pakistan. Dr. Mirranay's two brothers, Sayed Yousuf Mirranay and Sayed Sheerin Mirranay were also imprisoned in 1978, and both disappeared whilst incarcerated.

== Life in Pakistan ==
Dr. Mirranay worked as a medical officer in Afghani refugee camps in Pakistan from 1980 to 1986 for the United Nations, providing humanitarian assistance to Afghan refugees, particularly in the fields of health care and medical education. He provided medical training to the Afghan mujahedeen fighting the former Soviet Union and former Afghan communist government. In 1980, he was a founding member of the Afghan Doctors and Health Personal Association in Peshawar.

Dr. Mirranay chaired the Afghan Aid Association non-governmental organization from 1986 to 1991. Based in Peshawar, Pakistan, it was funded by international aid agencies including the UNDP, FAO, UNICEF, UNHCR, WHO, UNFPA and the UN Development Front for Women. The projects included services for Afghan refugee camps and reconstruction of Afghanistan to delivering public health programs, medical, and gender/children services. This includes female and male medical and health support for public/community health, midwifery, nursing and child services. The Afghan Aid Association was regarded by the UN as one of the most credible and transparent Afghan organisations involved in the delivery of aid for the country.

== Life in Australia ==
In 1991 Dr. Mirranay took political asylum and migrated to Australia, after assassination attempts and threats to his family from extremist groups.

In Australia, Dr. Mirranay established and chaired the Afghan Australian Welfare Association from 1994 to 2001, and worked tirelessly to assist newly arrived Afghan refugees to resettle in Australia. In recognition of his humanitarian services, Dr. Mirranay was awarded the Centenary Medal by the Australian Government.

== After the fall of the Taliban ==
After the fall of the Afghan Taliban regime in October 2001 and collapse of the Islamic Emirate of Afghanistan, Dr. Mirranay returned to Afghanistan to assist in the reconstruction of Afghanistan, participating in the Bonn and Rome conferences.

In 2005 Dr. Mirranay was elected as a member of the House of the People. He was an active member of the Parliamentary Committee for Compliance and Petation. He has headed a number of delegations and participated in conferences with neighbouring countries on behalf of the Afghanistan Government. He also participated in various international conferences, including NATO forums for the reconstruction of Afghanistan.

== Career highlights ==
- Prominent and leading member of the Afghan Social Democratic Party, Afghan Mellat 1966
- Graduated from Nanagarhar Medical Faculty, Kabul University 1976
- Imprisoned for 18 months by the Afghan Communist Government 1978
- Established Afghan Doctors and Health Personal Association in Peshawar 1980
- Worked as a Medical Officer for the United Nations in Afghan refugee camps in Peshawar 80-86
- Chaired the NGO, Afghan Aid Association 1986-1991
- Chaired of the Afghan Australian Welfare Association 1994-2001
- Re-established the Afghan Mellat Party Newspaper 2003 after the fall of the Taliban regime
- Elected as a member of Afghanistan Parliament or Wolesi Jirga in 2005-2010
- Head of the Afghan Mellat Parliamentary group in Walsai Jirga 2005-2010
- Official Spokesman for the Afghan Mellat Party
- Participated in numerous conferences and workshops around the world on behalf of the Afghan Parliament and Afghan Mellat political party
- Outspoken politician in Afghan and the international media on Afghan political affairs

== Personal life ==
Dr. Mirranay is married and has three sons and three daughters. His family reside in Melbourne, Australia where he is a member of the Australian Afghan community.
