= Chegarman-e Gholamhoseyn =

Chegarman-e Gholamhoseyn چگارمان غلامحسين
- Village
- Location within Iran
- Coordinates: 32°12′13″N 49°29′56″E
- Country: Iran
- Province: Khuzestan
- County: Andika
- Bakhsh: Central
- Rural District: Qaleh-ye Khvajeh

Population (2006)
  - Total: 240
- Time zone: UTC+3:30 (IRST)
  - Summer (DST): UTC+4:30 (IRDT)

Chegarman-e Gholamhoseyn (Persian: چگارمان غلامحسين, also Romanized as Chegārmān-e Gholāmḩoseyn; also known as Gholāmḩoseynābād) is a village in Qaleh-ye Khvajeh Rural District, in the Central District of Andika County, Khuzestan Province, Iran. At the 2006 census, its population was 240, in 41 families.
