= Khwaja MA Samdani =

Pakistani judge (1932–2013)

Khwaja Muhammad Ahmad Samdani
- خواجہ محمد احمد صمدانی

Justice, Lahore High Court
- In office 1971–1977

Joint Secretary in the Ministry of Law and Justice
- In office 1977–1981

Personal details
- Born: 1932 Kareem Nagar, Hyderabad (Deccan), Hyderabad State
- Died: 11 April 2013 (aged 80–81)
- Education: Islamia College Peshawar, Yale University (LLM)

Khwaja Muhammad Ahmad Samdani (13 May 1932 – 11 April 2013) was a Pakistani judge who served on the Lahore High Court bench.

== Early life and education ==
Samdani was born in 1932 in Kareem Nagar, Hyderabad Deccan. His family migrated to Pakistan after the Partition of India in 1947. After completing his education, Samdani taught at Islamia College Peshawar before joining the civil service and later transitioning to the judiciary. He also pursued an LLM at Yale University on a scholarship.

== Career ==
In 1972, Samdani was appointed as an additional judge at the Lahore High Court.

In 1974, during Zulfikar Ali Bhutto's tenure as prime minister, anti-Ahmadiyya violence erupted in Pakistan. Samdani chaired the Rabwah Tribunal, which investigated the violence that took place on 29 May 1974. Although the full report of the tribunal was not made public, it is noted that Justice Samdani considered the Second Constitutional Amendment, which declared Ahmadis as non-Muslims, to be a form of persecution against a vulnerable minority.

In the Nawab Muhammad Ahmed Khan Kasuri murder case against Zulfikar Ali Bhutto, he granted bail to Bhutto despite pressure from the military government led by Muhammad Zia-ul-Haq. Samdani's decision was seen as a display of judicial independence and impartiality.

In April 1980, while serving as the federal law secretary, Samdani had a confrontation with Zia-ul-Haq over remarks the general had made about secretaries. Samdani stood his ground and refused to apologise, believing in the correctness of his actions.

In 1981, Samdani was presented with a new oath containing clauses he deemed unconstitutional. Rather than comply with these clauses, he chose to retire from his position.
