= Hakim Ghulam Jilani =

Indian physician (1873–1926)

Hakim, Khan Sahib, Shams al-Atibba Hakim Ghulam Jilani
- Born: 15 May 1873; Lahore, Punjab Province, British India
- Died: 23 February 1926 (aged 52); Lahore, British India
- Education: Lahore Medical College (L.M.S.)
- Occupations: Physician, Hakim, Writer
- Known for: Author of Makhzan-e-Hikmat
- Awards: Shams al-Atibba (Qajar Iran), Khan Sahib (British India), Order of the Lion and the Sun (Qajar Iran)

Ghulam Jilani Ansari K.L.S. (15 May 1873 – 23 February 1926) was an Indian physician and hakim (practitioner of herbal medicine), known for his contributions to Urdu medical literature. For his services in the field of medicine, he received the honorary title Shams-ul-Attiba from the Government of Qajar Iran and the title Khan Sahib by the Government of British India.

== Early life and education ==
Jilani was born on 15 May 1873 in Lahore, Punjab Province (British India) into a noble Ansari family with scholarly traditions. His ancestors had migrated from Persia to Indian subcontinent. He completed his early education at home, where he studied Arabic, Persian and English, later passing the middle school from Normal Middle School, Lahore.

His father, Sultan Mahmood Ansari, was a religious scholar and hakīm (Unani physician) of his time, running a successful medical practice in Lahore. Inspired by his father's legacy, Jilani studied traditional Unani medicine under his father and other renowned hakims. He later enrolled in the Lahore Medical College, where he pursued modern medical studies. At the time, Western medical education in India was limited to diploma-level training, and in 1895, he earned a Licentiate in Medicine and Surgery (L.M.S.). That same year, he entered government service.

== Career ==
Jilani's scholarly abilities earned him an posting in Persian empire (now Iran), after serving in several frontier regions of Punjab. He began his career as the consular physician for the British Government in the areas of Qaenat and Kerman before being advanced to British agent in Birjand and later Tehran. He received professional acclaim for his medical skills for personal medical adviser to Ebrahim Alam (Shokat-ul-Mulk II), the ruler of Qaenat and Sistan. In 1901, he was appointed Medical Officer to the British consulate in Sistan.

Notable British dignitaries, including Sir Henry McMahon and Lord Ronaldshay, sought treatment from him during their travels in Iran around 1900 and praised his expertise. In recognition of his services, the Government of British India conferred upon him the honorary title of Khan Sahib in 1904. Earlier, in 1902, the Government of Qajar Iran awarded him the title Shams ul-Atibba (the sun of the physicians), and in 1903, Shah of Iran Mozaffar ad-Din bestowed upon him the prestigious Order of the Lion and the Sun. In 1904, he was also elected as a member of The Imperial Persian Sanitary Council.

In 1906, Jilani returned to Lahore on leave and resigned from the government service in 1907 for personal reasons. He then resumed private medical practice in Lahore but devoted much of his time to scholarly writing and research in medicine. His articles were published in The Indian Medical Record, a notable English-language journal based in Calcutta. Twice, he received award and certificates of merit for prize-winning contributions to the journal.

== Works ==
Jilani was known for his scholarly articles and discussions published in Urdu journals and periodicals. His writings were published in some prominent newspapers like Paisā Akhbār, Watan, and Vakil. In addition, his research-based and analytical articles were regularly published in well-regarded Unani medical journals, including Mujalla Ṭibbiyya (Delhi), Akhbār-i-Ḥikmat (Lahore), and particularly Rafīq ul-Aṭibbāʾ. The medical books, written by Jilani, were immensely popular during his lifetime. The best-known Makhzan-i-Hikmat or Ghar ka Hakim o Doctor (the Home physician) was widely read and appreciated by laymen and experts. The enduring popularity of the book is evident from the numerous editions published of its two volumes.

His writings were held in such high esteem in scholarly circles that copies of his books were included in the official collections of the India Office Library and the British Museum in London.

== Death ==
He died on 23 February 1926 and was buried in Lahore beside his brother, Hakim Ghulam Muhiyuddin Among his children, Masood Khadarpoosh and Hakim Mohammad Mahmood Ansari achieved distinction; the latter also served as custodian of his father's library.
