= Ghulam Murshid =

Bangladeshi litterateur and researcher (1940–2024)

- গোলাম মুরশিদ
- Born: 8 April 1939; Backergunge District, Bengal Province, British India
- Died: 22 August 2024 (aged 84); London, England
- Education: University of Dhaka
- Occupations: Author; scholar; journalist
- Employer(s): School of Oriental and African Studies, University of London
- Spouse: Eliza Murshid

Ghulam Murshid (8 April 1940 – 22 August 2024) was a Bangladeshi author, scholar and journalist based in London. He won a number of awards, including the Bangla Academy Literary Award in 1982 for his contribution to research; the Prothom Alo Book Award in 2007; the IFIC literary prize 2018; and the Ekushey Padak for language and literature in 2021

== Life and career ==
Murshid was born on 8 April 1940 at Dhamura village of Barisal district. Besides being a prolific author, he was also a distinguished lexicographer. Murshid edited a three-volume Bengali dictionary, called 'Bibartonmulak Bangla Abhidhan', published in 2013–2014. Two hundred years' of history of Bengali dictionaries, it is the first to be based on historical principles. It provides the evolution of the form and meaning of every word and traces the first use thereof in written Bengali.

Murshid died in London on 22 August 2024, at the age of 84.

== Selected research and publications ==
Books in English

- Reluctant Debutante: Response of Bengali Women to Modernization, 1849–1905
- Lured by Hope: A Biography of Michael Madhusudan Dutt.
- The Heart of a Rebel Poet: Letters of Michael Madhusudan Dutt.
- Bengali Culture Over A Thousand Years

Books in Bengali

- Vaishnava Padavali Prabeshak [An Introduction to Medieval Vaishnava Songs]
- Vidyasagar [Ishwar Chandra Vidyasagar: 150th Anniversary Commemoration Volume].
- Bangladesher Swadhinata Sangramer Samskritik Patabhumi [The Cultural Background of the War of Liberation in Bangladesh]
- Rabindraviswe Purba-Banga Purba-Bange Rabindracharcha (Based on the Vidyadagar Endowment Lectures given at Calcutta University)
- Samaj Samskar Andolan O Bangla Natak, 1865-76
- Bangla Mudran O Prakashanar Adi-Parba
- Samkocher Bivhabalata: Adhunikatar Abhighate Banga-Ramanir Pratikriya
- Bengali English Bengali Dictionary
- Kalantare Bangla Gadya
- Jakhan Palatak
- Rasasundari theke Rokeya: Nariprogatir Eksho Bachhar
- Ashar Chhalaner Bhuli
- Ujan Srote Bangladesh
- Hazar Bachhorer Bangali Samskriti
- Nari Dharmo Ityadi
- Madhur Khonje
- Kalapanir Hatchhani: Bilete Bangalir Itihas
- Atharo Shataker Bangla Gadya: Itiahs O Sankalan
- Chhoto-barho Sobar Michael
- Muktijuddha O tarpor: Ekti Nirdaliya Itihas
- Bangla Academy Bibartanmulak Abhidhan, 3 Vols, Editor
- Renaissance Banglar Renaissance
- Alokita Mukhocchabi
- Bidrohi Ranaklanta: Nazrul Jibani
- Rabindranather Nari-bhabna
- Bangla Ganer Itihas
