= Ghulam Dastagir Birajdar =

Indian Muslim pandit and Sanskrit scholar

Ghulam Dastagir Birajdar was a prominent Indian Muslim pandit and Sanskrit scholar. He was one of a half-dozen Muslim pandits in the country whose understanding of Sanskrit garnered him acclaim. He was well known for his struggle against communalism and promotion of communal harmony.
