= Ghulam Ahmad =

Ghulam Ahmad or Ghulam Ahmed may refer to:

- Mirza Ghulam Ahmad (1835–1908), Indian religious figure, founder of the Ahmadiyya movement
- Ghulam Ahmad Faroghi (1861–1919), scholar of Arabic and Persian language at Bhopal state
- Peerzada Ghulam Ahmad, known as Mahjoor (1885–1952), Kashmiri poet
- Ghulam Ahmed Perwez (1903–1985), Pakistani Islamic scholar
- Ghulam Ahmed Chishti (1905–1994), Indian/Pakistani music composer, one of the founders of Pakistani film music
- Ghulam Ahmed (cricketer) (1922–1998), Indian cricketer
- Ghulam Ahmad (forester) (1923–2003), Pakistani forestry official, later managing director of chrome mining company
- Ghulam Ahmad Bilour (born 1939), Pakistani politician
- Ghulam Ahmed Hasan Mohammed Parkar, known as Ghulam Parkar (born 1955), Indian cricketer
- Ghulam Ahmad Ashai, Kashmiri bureaucrat and political leader
