= Ghulam Haider Gagroo =

Kh Ghulam Haider Gagroo
- Born: February 1912
- Died: 11 November 1975 (aged 63); Kishtwar
- Resting place: Kishtwar
- Education: High School Kishtwar; Saint High School Kishtwar; Sri Pratap College; Prince Wales College Jammu (B.A.)
- Occupations: Magistrate and poet
- Relatives: Kh Abdul Ghani Gagroo and Khurshid Beghum
- Writing career
- Pen name: Qaiser Kishtwari
- Language: Kashmiri and Urdu
- Genre: Poetry
- Subject: Islam

Kh Ghulam Haider Gagroo (February 1912 – 11 November 1975), also known as Qaiser Kishtwari, was a Kashmiri magistrate who composed poetry in the Kashmiri and Urdu languages. Dr Zaheer Uddin describes Qaiser Kishtwari as "a popular Kashmiri and Urdu poet; he wrote a number of poems and articles, including Islamic books."

== Education ==
Kh Ghulam Haider Gagroo completed his basic education from High school Kishtwar, Interence from Saint High School Kishtwar, FA from Sri Pratap College (SP college), and BA from Prince Wales College Jammu. After graduation he joined Alighar Muslim University and completed an LL.B. in law. He was the first Muslim student among the 40,000 Muslim inhabitants of Udhampur, Jammu and Kashmir who achieved this degree.

== Judicial career ==
He started law practice in Kishtwar. His success as an attorney attracted the attention of the Government and was appointed as a prosecutor at Kishtwar, Jammu & Kashmir. His hard work and hard struggle made him the first registrar and then Munsif. He was transferred to Mirpur Jammu and Kashmir where he was working and the promoted as Magistrate to Mirpur where he remain until partition. During the partition in 1947 as he was with his family in Mirpur now known as Azad Kashmir, he did his duty in different areas of Asad Kashmir as a Magistrate until his force retirement in 1958 due to his honesty, integrity, and uprightnous. After his retirement he was also appointed as a Settlement deputy Commissioner at Okara Pakistan for a few months and again started law practise at Muzaffrarabad, the capital of Azad Kashmir. When in 1935 the Anjuman-Adab Kishtwar was formed, Kh Ghulum Haider Gagroo became the first nominated president of this Anjuman.

== Family life ==
The Gagroo Dynasty came from Srinagar to Kishtwar. One of the family members went with their family to Bhaderwah Tehsil Jammu kashmir and the other members came to Kishtwar. It was preliminary under Sikhism Rule. At this time, Hazoor Joo Gagroo was very famous in his dynasty and Kh Ghulam Haider Gagroo (also known as Qaisar Kishtwari) is the fourth generation in this family. His father was a great business person who through a lot of effort educated his son. Ghulam Haider Gagroo was born in 1912 to Kh Abdul Ghani Gagroo and Khurshid Beghum. In November 1975 when he went to visit his family in Kishtwar, he suffered a heart attack after only two days and died on 11 November 1975. He is buried in Kishtwar. He left behind twelve children, four of them died, others are in Pakistan. The detail of his children and grandchildren is as follows:

- Son, Mr. Yousaf Haroon Kishtawari; with a daughter Sorayya Kanal Kishtawari who works as a freelance journalist and a son Ayaz settled in London along with his sister Mrs. Saleema Akhtar (late) having three sons; Nadeem Iqbal, Javed Iqbal and Naeem Iqbal.

- Mrs. Nasim Firdous (Late) being his eldest daughter who died in 2004 leaving behind four sons and a daughter; Mr. Tariq Siddique (Late), Mr. Khalid Siddique, Brig. (R) Tahir Siddique, Mr. Basil Siddique and Mrs. Juveria Rafique.

- Mrs. Rukhsana Parveen Akhtar, settled in Lahore with four children; Mr. Waqas Ali Mehmood, Mr. Omar Ali Mehmood, Mrs. Shaffaq Zia and Mrs. Amber Basil.

- Mr. Nisar Haider and Mr. Farooq Haider, both sons now retired from Civil Service of the AJK.

- Dr. Waqar Haider, renowned cardiologist of the Azad State.

== See also ==
- List of Kashmiri people
- Ethnic groups of Azad Kashmir
- List of people from Jammu and Kashmir
