= Gholamali, Kurdistan =

Gholamali غلام‌علی
- Village
- Location within Iran
- Coordinates: 36°24′05″N 45°59′55″E
- Country: Iran
- Province: Kurdistan
- County: Saqqez
- Bakhsh: Central
- Rural District: Torjan

Population (2006)
  - Total: 116
- Time zone: UTC+3:30 (IRST)
  - Summer (DST): UTC+4:30 (IRDT)

Gholamali (Persian: غلام‌علی, also Romanized as Gholām‘alī) is a village in Torjan Rural District, in the Central District of Saqqez County, Kurdistan Province, Iran. At the 2006 census, its population was 116, in 25 families. The village is populated by Kurds.
