= Ghulam (disambiguation) =

Ghulam is an Arabic name.

Ghulam or Gholam may also refer to:

- Gholam Ali, Sistan and Baluchestan, a village in Iran
- Ghulam (film), a 1998 Hindi film
- Ghulam, or Ghilman, slave soldiers
- Golam, a 2001 Bangladeshi film
- Golam, a 2024 Malayalam police procedural thriller film
- Gulam, an Indian practitioner of pehlwani

== See also ==
- Ghulami (disambiguation)
