= Ghulam Qadir Jatoi =

Ghulam Qadir Jatoi is a senior advocate of Supreme Court of Pakistan and President of the Islamic Lawyers Forum (ILF). He has authored several books on law and legal principles of Islam. Sood ki Nahusat ("The filth of interest") is one of his recent books. He has more than 50 years of experience in the field of law. There are great number of reported cases of High Court and Supreme Court that are published in different law journals of Pakistan. He is known to be an associate of A.K. Brohi. In his early years of practice, he worked as an advocate in A.K. Brohi's company. A.K. Brohi used to ask him about Jatoi's opinion in the cases that were brought to A.K. Brohi. Jatoi became the advocate of Supreme Court in the year 1996. Also, he has established his own law firm by the name Ghulam Qadir Jatoi & Co. in which his daughter Fatima Jameela Jatoi, who is also an advocate of High Court Sindh, works along with other associates. Currently, Ghulam Qadir Jatoi is working as an Advocate on Record in the Supreme Court of Pakistan.
