= Beheading of Ghulam Nabi =

Filmed beheading in 2007

Ghulam Nabi غلام نبی

Ghulam Nabi was a Pakistani militant involved with the Taliban and had fought against the pro-American Northern Alliance in Afghanistan during the US-led war in Afghanistan.

A video obtained by the Associated Press on 20 April 2007 shows a young boy, looking to be around 12 years of age, beheading a man identified as Nabi. According to the AP report, "A continuous 2½-minute shot then shows the victim lying on his side on a patch of rubble-strewn ground. A man holds Nabi by his beard while the boy, wearing a camouflage military jacket and oversized white sneakers, cuts into the throat. Other men and boys call out "Allahu akbar!" — "God is great!" — as blood spurts from the wound. The film, overlain with nasheeds, then shows the boy hacking and slashing at the man's neck until the head is severed."

The beheading was condemned and called a "new low" by Sam Zarifi of Human Rights Watch, and also condemned by the Human Rights Commission of Pakistan.
