= Ghulam Hassan Pinglana =

Indian politician

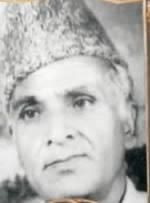

Ghulam Hassan Pinglana (d. 9 April 1996) was an Indian politician who was assassinated by an unknown gunman in his home village of Pinglana, Pulwama district, Jammu and Kashmir.

Born in Pinglana (1939), he started his career as a leader of Shahoora agitation saying the government neglected Shahoora. He was later on elected to the Jammu and Kashmir Legislative Council under an agreement reached between the Shahoora agitation committee and then prime minister Bakshi Ghulam Mohammad. In 1980 he was elected District President of the Jammu and Kashmir Pradesh Congress Committee (JKPCC). He was later promoted and remained vice President of the JKPCC. In 1989 he resigned from congress and was believed to have come closer to pro freedom Jamat Islami. From 1990 to 1995 he was arrested twice by Indian security forces for his alleged links with Jamat Islami. He served as a Member of the Legislative Council (MLC) and as a parliamentarian in the Indian National Congress.

He was assassinated at his home in a wave of pre-election violence by an unknown gunman. Amnesty International reported that he was killed "allegedly by the Hizbul Mujahideen." Hizbul Mujahideen, like most militants blamed pro-Indian forces.
