= Kalateh-ye Molla Gholamhoseyn =

Kalateh-ye Molla Gholamhoseyn كلاته ملاغلامحسين
- Village
- Location within Iran
- Coordinates: 37°18′08″N 57°13′52″E
- Country: Iran
- Province: North Khorasan
- County: Bojnord
- Bakhsh: Central
- Rural District: Aladagh

Population (2006)
  - Total: 179
- Time zone: UTC+3:30 (IRST)
  - Summer (DST): UTC+4:30 (IRDT)

Kalateh-ye Molla Gholamhoseyn (Persian: كلاته ملاغلامحسين, also Romanized as Kalāteh-ye Mollā Gholāmḩoseyn) is a village in Aladagh Rural District, in the Central District of Bojnord County, North Khorasan Province, Iran. At the 2006 census, its population was 179, in 47 families.
