= Gholamreza Emrani =

غلامرضا عمرانی Gholamreza Emrani
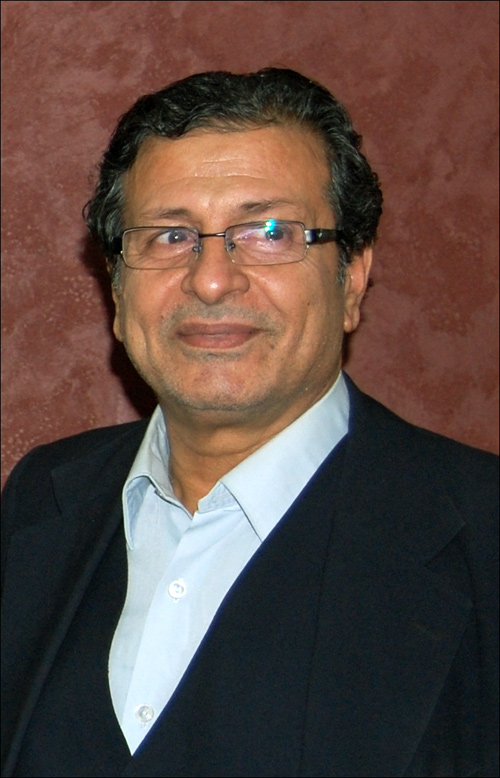
- Born: 1947 (age 78–79); Zabol, Iran
- Occupation: Linguist
- Spouse: married

Gholamreza Emrani (Persian: غلامرضا عمرانی; also Romanized as "Gholāmrezā Emrāni", Persian pronunciation: [ɣolɒːmreˈzɒː emrɒːˈni:]; born 1947 in Zabol, Iran) is an Iranian linguist and an iconic figure in the field of Sistanian studies. He is best known for his extensive contributions to the Iranian Curriculum Development Center as well as publishing a lot of exquisite works generally under the title of the Majmue-ye-Sistan (Sistan Series) with regards to Sistanian dialect documentation.

Apart from his academic career and contributions to the Iranian Ministry of Education, he has also published many books falling into several categories, including Persian history, grammar and literature, and numerous articles in linguistics in national language journals.

== Works and publications ==
=== Books ===
- Gholamreza, Emrani (2018). "Descriptive Grammar of Sistan Dialect: Examining Sentence Structure in Sistan Dialect". In Farhang, Omrani (ed.). The Central Area of Zabul City, Sistan Dialect Book. p. 588. ISBN 978-6-009-09902-3.
- Emrani, Gholamreza (2011). A selection of Masnavi stories. Companion Books. p. 306.
- Emrani, Gholamreza; Hamon, Sabti (2011). Persian Language Book (Teaching-Learning Strategies). Companion Books. p. 154. ISBN 978-964-0-70300-7.

=== Articles ===
- Gholamreza, Emrani. "Hundreds of thousands of hopes of mankind". The growth of Persian language and literature education. 1 (91): 52–53.
- Gholamreza, Emrani (2016). "Note: From the language of the article". Teacher's growth. 1 (213): 213–213.
- Gholamreza, Emrani (2018). "Linguistics from the beginning to the present day". The growth of Persian language and literature education. Noormags.
- Gholamreza, Emrani (2013). "A review on the introduction and criticism of the Persian grammar book". The growth of Persian language and literature education. Noormags.
- Gholamreza, Emrani (2019). "The multi-part memoirs of the sheep of literature and art". The growth of Persian language and literature education. 1 (97): 1.
- Gholamreza, Emrani. "Memories and experiences: Seven-part sentences". The growth of Persian language and literature education. 1 (95): 1.

== Awards and recognition ==
The Sistan Series, his multi-volume set of analytical and descriptive documentation of Sistanian dialect, which is regarded as the best work of its kind in Iran, was appreciated in the Iranian Season's Book Awards ceremony in 2010.
