= Gholam-Reza Pourmand =

Gholam Reza Pourmand is a notable Iranian urologist and medical scientist.

He is currently a full professor of urology and director of the "Renal Transplantation Research Center" of the Tehran University of Medical Sciences.

Prof. Pourmand has published numerous research articles in urology in peer-reviewed international journals. His novel prostate surgery method attracted attention from the international medical community.

== See also ==
- Iranian science
