= Ghulam Abbas =

Ghulam Abbas (Arabic: غلام عباس) is a Muslim given name or surname and may refer to:

- Chaudhry Ghulam Abbas (1904–1967), lawyer and politician of Jammu and Kashmir
- Ghulam Abbas (writer) (1909–1982), Pakistani short-story writer
- Gulam Abbas Moontasir (born 1942), Indian basketball player
- Ghulam Abbas (cricketer) (born 1947), Pakistani cricketer
- Ghulam Abbas Kazmi (born 1955), Indian criminal lawyer
- Ghulam Abbas (hurdler) (born 1966), Pakistani hurdler, competed for Pakistan at the 1992 Summer Olympics
- Gholam-Abbas Ashoubi, also known as Farzad Ashoubi (born 1980), Iranian footballer
- Ghulam Abbas (singer) (born 1955), Pakistani singer
