= Ghulam Farooq (detainee) =

- Detained at: Bagram
- Other name
- ISN: 1442
- Charge(s): no charge, extrajudicial detention

On January 15, 2010, the Department of Defense complied with a court order and published a list of Captives held in the Bagram Theater Internment Facility that included the name Haji Ghulam Farooq.

There were 645 names on the list, which was dated September 22, 2009, and was heavily redacted.

According to historian Andy Worthington, author of The Guantanamo Files, Ghulam Farooq was released on May 15, 2010. Worthington reported that Ghulam was one of the first captives to be released following the newly instituted Detainee Review Board. He was released with nine other men. Their release ceremony was attended by some senior American and Afghan officials, including Lieutenant General John R. Allen. According to reporters from the McClatchy News Service Ghulam told the officials he was innocent, and "he was afraid he was forever tarnished as a suspect who could be scooped up again at any time."
