= Gholamali, Khuzestan =

Gholamali غلامعلی
- Village
- Location within Iran
- Coordinates: 32°08′58″N 49°30′56″E
- Country: Iran
- Province: Khuzestan
- County: Andika
- Bakhsh: Abezhdan
- Rural District: Abezhdan

Population (2006)
  - Total: 32
- Time zone: UTC+3:30 (IRST)
  - Summer (DST): UTC+4:30 (IRDT)

Gholamali (Persian: غلامعلی, also Romanized as Gholāmʿalī; also known as Gholāmʿali Ābād) is a village in Abezhdan Rural District, Abezhdan District, Andika County, Khuzestan Province, Iran. At the 2006 census, its population was 32, in 6 families.
