= Ghulam Jilani Popal =

Ghulam Jelani Popal

Governance Advisor to the President of Afghanistan
- Incumbent
- Assumed office 2012

Personal details
- Born: 9 January 1955 (age 71) Barikot, Kabul, Afghanistan
- Party: Afghan Mellat
- Education: Faculty of Law, Kabul University, 1978

Ghulam Jelani Popal (Pashto: غلام جیلاني پوپل) (born 9 January 1955), commonly known as Jelani Popal, is an Afghan politician and civil servant. He was appointed governance advisor to the President of Afghanistan in 2012. From September 2007 to December 2010 he served as the first Director General of the Independent Directorate of Local Governance (IDLG) in Afghanistan. Between 2003 and 2005, following the collapse of the Taliban regime and the establishment of the new Afghan government, Popal served as deputy minister for customs and revenue in the Ministry of Finance.

== Early life ==
Popal was born in the Barikot neighborhood of Kabul, Afghanistan, where his forefathers settled during the reign of Timur Shah Abdali when the Afghan capital was moved from Kandahar to Kabul. He attended Habibia High School and graduated from the Faculty of Law at Kabul University in 1978.

== Career ==
Between 1982 and 1989, Popal worked in Pakistan as a program officer for the Salvation Army Refugee Assistance Program. In 1990 he founded the Afghan Development Association, which he managed until 2000. He was also one of the seven founding directors of Afghan Health and Development Services (AHDS). Between 1995 and 1999 he represented Afghan civil society at the United Nations.

From 2000 to 2003, Popal worked in the United States as a senior social worker for San Joaquin County, California. After returning to Afghanistan, he served between 2003 and 2005 as deputy minister for customs and revenue in the Ministry of Finance. In September 2007, Popal was appointed the first Director General of the Independent Directorate of Local Governance (IDLG), a post he held until December 2010. In 2012, he was appointed governance advisor to the President of Afghanistan.

Popal has attended management and development courses in Europe and the United States and is fluent in English, Pashto, Dari, and Urdu.

== Political affiliation ==
Popal has been associated with the Afghan Social Democratic Party (Afghan Mellat), in which he has served as a vice president.
