= Ghulam Farid =

Ghulam Farid (Arabic: غُلام فرید) is a male Muslim given name. It may refer to

- Khwaja Ghulam Farid (1845–1901), Indian Sufi poet
- Malik Ghulam Farid (1897–1977), Ahmadiyya missionary
- Ghulam Farid Sabri (1930–1994), Pakistani Qawwali singer
