= Sanjay Dhar =

Indian judge of the High Court of Jammu and Kashmir and Ladakh (born 1965)

Justice Sanjay Dhar
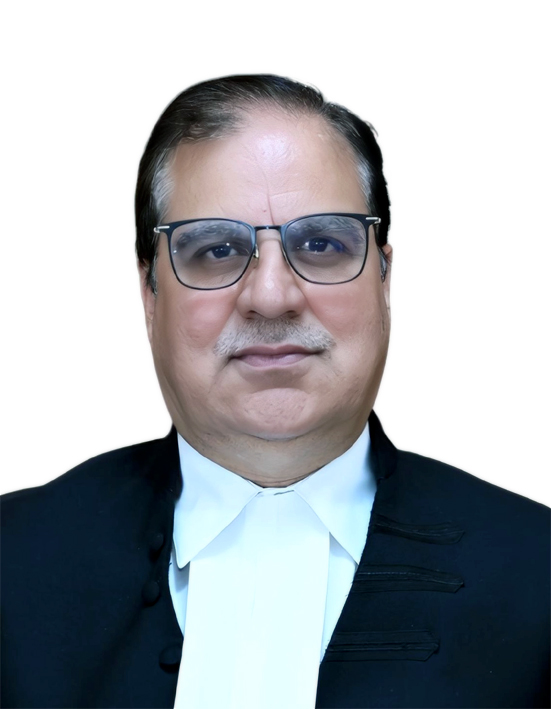
- Justice Dhar in 2026

Judge of the High Court of Jammu and Kashmir and Ladakh
- Incumbent
- Assumed office 7 April 2020
- Nominated by: Sharad Arvind Bobde
- Appointed by: Ram Nath Kovind

Personal details
- Born: 11 May 1965 (age 61) Danow (Bogund), Kulgam, Jammu and Kashmir, India
- Education: Bachelor of Science; Bachelor of Law
- Alma mater: Sri Pratap College; University of Kashmir

Sanjay Dhar (born 11 May 1965) is an Indian judge of the High Court of Jammu and Kashmir and Ladakh, having assumed office on 7 April 2020.

== Early life and career ==
Sanjay Dhar was born in Danow (Bogund) in Kulgam district of Jammu and Kashmir. He completed his early schooling in his native village, earned a degree in Science from S.P. College, Srinagar, and later obtained a Bachelor of Laws from the University of Kashmir. He enrolled as an advocate in 1990 and subsequently practiced at the Delhi High Court. In 1997, he joined the judicial service as a Munsiff. Over the following decades, he held various judicial and administrative postings within the lower courts of Jammu and Kashmir. Immediately prior to his elevation as a High Court judge in April 2020, he served as the Registrar General of the Jammu and Kashmir High Court.

== Appointment to the High Court ==
Justice Dhar was appointed as a judge of the High Court of Jammu and Kashmir and Ladakh through a notification issued by the Government of India on 3 April 2020. He took oath of office on 7 April 2020.

== See also ==
- List of sitting judges of the high courts of India
- High Court of Jammu and Kashmir and Ladakh
