= Dhamura =

Dhamura ধামুরা
- Village
- Location in Bangladesh
- Coordinates: 22°53′N 90°12′E
- Country: Bangladesh
- Division: Barisal Division
- District: Barisal District
- Upazila: Wazirpur Upazila

Government

Area
  - Total: 5.78 km^{2} (2.23 sq mi)

Population (2022)
  - Total: 10,346
  - Density: 1,790/km^{2} (4,640/sq mi)
- Time zone: UTC+6 (Bangladesh Time)
- Postal code: 8221

Dhamura is a small town in Wazirpur Upazila of Barisal District in the Barisal Division of southern-central Bangladesh.

== Demography ==
According to the 2022 Census of Bangladesh, Dhamura had 2,172 households and a population of 10,346. It has a total area of 5.78 km^{2} (2.23 sq mi).

== Notable people ==
2. Geographic Names. National Geospatial-Intelligence Agency. Accessed on 18 January 2011.

3. Bangladesh Bureau of Statistics (2025). Community Report: Barishal. Population and Housing Census 2022. Archived from the original on 28 September 2025.

4. Bangladesh Bureau of Statistics. Small Area Atlas of Bangladesh: Barishal Zila. Bangladesh National Portal. Retrieved on 10 June 2022.

Note: The English spellings of personal names and official designations should ideally be cross-checked against their official records before publication.
