= Ghulam Nabi Sheikh =

Ghulam Nabi Sheikh (Kashmiri: ग़ुलाम नबी शेख़ (Devanagari), غلام نبی شیخ (Nastaleeq)) (died July 13, 2003) was a Kashmiri musician. He is credited with reviving Kashmiri music after Kashmiri Pandits left Kashmir during the political conflict in 1990. He was killed by the Punjab Police in 2003.

== Music career ==
Sheikh started his music career at the age of 14. He gained widespread popularity in Kashmir and India, and became known as the "Mehdi Hassan of Kashmir". He received many national and international awards, including the one from the Chief Minister of Jammu and Kashmir, for his contributions to Kashmiri music and art.

== Death and aftermath ==
Sheikh was killed by the Punjab Police when he was travelling on a train with his daughter and a Kashmiri Pandit friend on the night of 13 July 2003. The Punjab police cremated his body within hours of his death to destroy evidence. Sheikh's death caused an outpouring of grief in Kashmir and India.

In 2003, the Punjab and Chandigarh High Court started trial for Sheikh's murder and hurried cremation, handed later the investigation to the Central Bureau of Investigation (CBI). No justice was served.

== Legacy ==
Sheikh was survived by his wife, two daughters and a son.

On July 13 every year, he is remembered by his fans and friends. An annual prize established in his memory is awarded to young musicians of Kashmir.

== See also ==
- Music of Kashmir
