= Gholamreza, Khuzestan =

Gholamreza غلامرضا
- Village
- Location within Iran
- Coordinates: 32°14′00″N 49°25′00″E
- Country: Iran
- Province: Khuzestan
- County: Andika
- Bakhsh: Central
- Rural District: Qaleh-ye Khvajeh

Population (2006)
  - Total: 25
- Time zone: UTC+3:30 (IRST)
  - Summer (DST): UTC+4:30 (IRDT)

Gholamreza (Persian: غلامرضا, also Romanized as Gholāmreẕā; also known as Gholāmreẕāābād) is a village in Qaleh-ye Khvajeh Rural District, in the Central District of Andika County, Khuzestan Province, Iran. At the 2006 census, its population was 25, in 4 families.
