= Gholam Ali, Sistan and Baluchestan =

Gholam Ali غلامعلی
- Village
- Location within Iran
- Coordinates: 31°05′38″N 61°29′37″E
- Country: Iran
- Province: Sistan and Baluchestan
- County: Hirmand
- Bakhsh: Central
- Rural District: Dust Mohammad

Population (2006)
  - Total: 423
- Time zone: UTC+3:30 (IRST)
  - Summer (DST): UTC+4:30 (IRDT)

Gholam Ali (Persian: غلامعلی, also Romanized as Gholām ʿAlī and Gholām‘alī; also known as Gholām) is a village in Dust Mohammad Rural District, in the Central District of Hirmand County, Sistan and Baluchestan Province, Iran. At the 2006 census, its population was 423, in 69 families.
