= Rafique Ullah Khan =

Bangladeshi academic

Rafique Ullah Khan is a Bangladeshi academic and the first vice-chancellor of Netrokona University. He is a professor of Bangla at the University of Dhaka.

== Early life Education and Career ==
Rafique Ullah Khan (born 21 January 1957) is a Bangladeshi essayist, researcher and literary critic. His research on Bengali novels and modern poetry is particularly notable. He has also published notable books and articles on Michael Madhusudan Dutt, Rabindranath Tagore, Kazi Nazrul Islam and Hasan Hafizur Rahman. He received the Bangla Academy Literary Award in 2017 for his overall contribution to research. He is actively associated with various educational and research institutions at the national and international levels. Rafique Ullah Khan was born on January 21, 1957, in Char Gobindpur village of Manikganj district. His father's name was AKM Saiful Islam Khan. He was a school teacher and the founding principal and doctor of Homeo College. His mother, Nurunnahar Firoza Khanam, was a teacher and writer at a girls' school. Both of them were literary enthusiasts. Nurunnahar Firoza Khanam's 'Amar Swapna, Amar Sangram' (2015) is an impeccable biography of an educationally inclined rural woman. In 1946, the two of them founded 'Gole-Monir Junior Girls' School' in remote rural areas, West Manikganj, with the aim of expanding women's education.

Rafique Ullah Khan's education began in the village primary school. He passed his secondary school from Daptiyar High School, Nagarpur in 1972. He passed his higher secondary examination from Sherpur Degree College, Bogra in 1976. In 1980, he passed the graduation examination in the Bangla Department of Dhaka University with honors. In 1981, he secured first place in the first class in the MA examination. In 1983–1985, he wrote a research book titled 'Hasan Hafizur Rahman: Life and Literature' as a scholarship researcher of the Bangla Academy. In October 1985, he joined the Bangla Department of Dhaka University as a lecturer. Rafique Ullah Khan started his career in 1983 as a Bangla Academy scholarship researcher. Towards the end of that year, he was appointed to the Bangla Academy's research work. He wrote 'Hasan Hafizur Rahman: Life and Literature'. Before joining the university as a teacher in 1985, he wrote two books titled 'Michael Rabindranath and Others' (1985) and 'Poetry and Society' (1985). The books were published by the Bangla Academy. He gained fame in literary studies and essay writing since his student days. Before joining as a teacher, he wrote more than a hundred articles, both research-based and creative. He obtained his PhD degree in 1995. The research topic: 'Bangladesh Novels: Subject and Artistic Form (1947–1987)'. He is currently the joint editor of the executive committee of the International Society of Bengal Studies and the General Secretary of the Bangladesh Chapter of the International Society of Bengal Studies. He is the director of the Bangladesh Cultural Research Center of Dhaka University (2012–2018).

PUBLISHED BOOKS

1. Poetry & Society,1985, Bangla academy, Dhaka (in Bengali) 2. Michael, Rabindranath & Others, 1985, Bangla academy, Dhaka (in Bengali) 3. Essays On Rabindranath, 1993, Bangla academy, Dhaka (in Bengali) 4. Hasan Hafizur Rahman; Life & Works,1993, Bangla academy, Dhaka (in Bengali) 5. Novels of Bangladesh; Content and Structure,1997, Bangla academy, Dhaka (in Bengali) 6. Novels of Satyen Sen; Speciality of Content & Artistic View, 1999, Afsar Brothers, Dhaka (in Bengali) 7. Bengali Novels of the 20th Century, 2000, Mowla Brothers, Dhaka (in Bengali) 8. Various Contents of the Fiction and Aesthetics, 2002, Ononnya Publishers, Dhaka (in Bengali) 9. Poetry of Bangladesh; Changing Paradigm, 2002 Ekushe Prokashoni, Dhaka (in Bengali) 10. Unconscious and Poetry,2010, Dhrubapad, Dhaka (In Bengali) 11. Narratology and Characterization,2011, Charuipi Prokahon, Dhka
