= Hans Raj Dogra =

Indian politician

Hans Raj Dogra (died August 1999) was an Indian politician and member of the Indian National Congress . Dogra was a member of the Jammu and Kashmir Legislative Assembly from Doda constituency in 1967 and 1972.
