= Arturo Goyeneche =

Argentine politician (1877–1940)

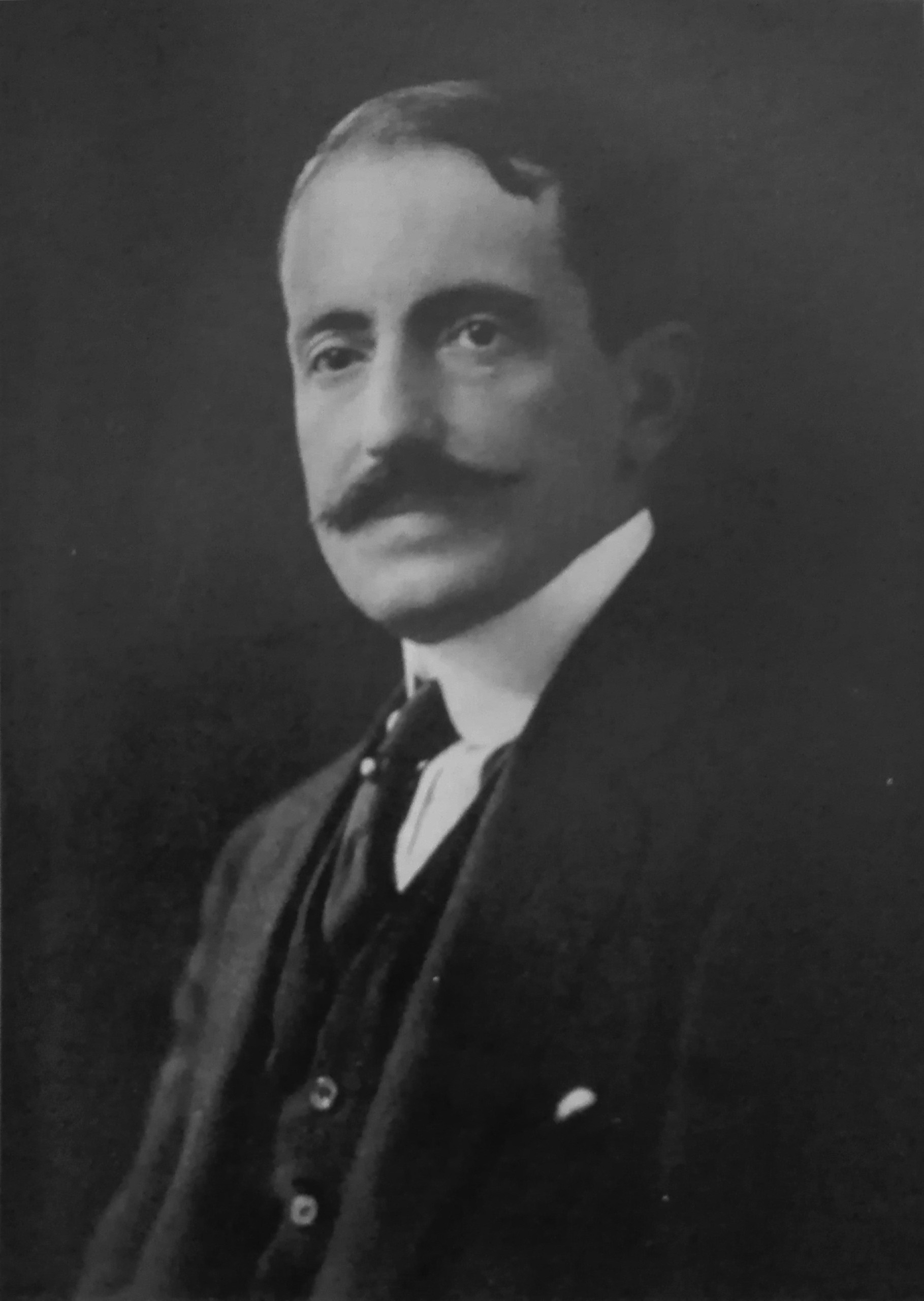
- Goyeneche in 1919

Mayor of Buenos Aires
- In office 19 February 1938 – 26 November 1940
- President: Roberto M. Ortiz
- Preceded by: Mariano de Vedia y Mitre
- Succeeded by: Raúl Savarese

President of the Chamber of Deputies
- In office 25 April 1919 – 25 April 1922
- Preceded by: Fernando Saguier
- Succeeded by: Ricardo Pereyra Rozas

Personal details
- Born: 4 August 1877 Buenos Aires, Argentina
- Died: 29 November 1940 (aged 63) Buenos Aires, Argentina
- Party: Radical Civic Union
- Children: Juan Carlos Goyeneche

Arturo Domingo Goyeneche (4 August 1877 – 29 November 1940) was an Argentine lawyer and politician who served as intendente (mayor) of the City of Buenos Aires from 1938 to 1940, appointed by President Roberto M. Ortiz. A member of the Radical Civic Union (UCR), Goyeneche also served as president of the National Chamber of Deputies, the lower house of Argentina's National Congress.

== Early life ==
Goyeneche was born on 4 August 1877 in Recoleta, Buenos Aires into a family of Basque background.

== Political career ==
During the late 1910s and early 1920s he served as a member of the National Chamber of Deputies, representing the Federal Capital. On 25 April 1919 he was elected by his peers to preside the Chamber, a position he held until 1922.

During the 1930s, he began consolidating political power in southern Buenos Aires through relationships with local ward bosses ("punteros"). His network extended to figures controlling brothels in the portside neighborhood of La Boca, forging an unusual alliance between UCR factions and British company-aligned strike-breaking enforcers. This period marked the development of his controversial political machine that blended formal party politics with underworld connections.

He was a founding member of the Argentine Olympic Committee and served in its first executive board. He provided financial support to Club Atlético Boca Juniors for their landmark acquisition of land on Brandsen Street; this strategic purchase enabled the construction of what would become the iconic Alberto J. Armando Stadium, colloquially known as "La Bombonera", one of world football's most famous venues.

In recognition of this pivotal support during the club's formative years, Boca Juniors granted him honorary membership status.

=== Mayor of Buenos Aires ===
Upon the election of Roberto Marcelino Ortiz as President of Argentina on 18 February 1938, Goyeneche was appointed as Mayor of Buenos Aires, succeeding Mariano de Vedia y Mitre. As mayor, he notably vetoed a proposed ordinance that would have demolished the Obelisco de Buenos Aires, then a newly inaugurated but publicly unpopular monument. His administration acquired new lands in 1939 for hospital expansion, though these were soon sold at less than 10% of their value to private developers. These suspicious transactions prompted investigations into corruption networks involving President Ortiz's circle and Buenos Aires UCR politicians. The land deals became emblematic of the Infamous Decade's commonplace corruption.

He died on 26 November 1940, three days after his resignation as mayor. He was replaced in interim fashion by councilman Raúl Savarese, before the appointment of Carlos Alberto Pueyrredón.

== Personal life ==
Goyeneche was interred in the family mausoleum at La Recoleta Cemetery. His political legacy remains complicated by his son Juan Carlos' later affiliation with Nazi-aligned movements during the 1940s.

Political offices
Preceded by Fernando Saguier	President of the Chamber of Deputies; 1919–1922	Succeeded by Ricardo Pereyra Rozas
Preceded by Mariano de Vedia y Mitre	Mayor of Buenos Aires; 1938–1940	Succeeded by Raúl Savarese
