= Rabbi (disambiguation) =

Rabbi is a Jewish title.

Rabbi or Rabboni may also refer to:

== Places ==
- Rabbi (river), a river in Italy
- Rabbi, Trentino, a municipality in Trentino, Italy

== People ==
- List of people called Rabbi
- Rabbi Shergill (born 1973), Indian musician and singer

== Other uses ==
- Rabbi (album), a 2004 Punjabi-language album by Rabbi Shergill
- Rabbi (date), a palm date cultivar
- Rabbi, a mentor
- Title for a Mandaean priest
- Rabboni (sculpture), a public artwork by Gutzon Borglum
- Rabboni (steam tug)

== See also ==
- The Rabbi (disambiguation)
- Rab (disambiguation)
- Hayyi Rabbi – Transcendental deity of the Mandaeans
