= Rab =

Rab may refer to:

== Places ==
- Rab (island), an island in Croatia
  - Rab (town), on the island
  - Rab concentration camp, an Italian camp on the island during World War II
- Ráb, the Slovak name of Győr, a city in Hungary
- Rąb, a village in Poland

== People ==
- Rab (surname), includes a list of people with the name
- Rab (nickname), a list of people
- Rab Bruce Lockhart (1916–1990), Scottish rugby union player

== Fictional characters ==
- Rab, a character from Dragon Quest XI
- Rab C. Nesbitt, a character from the British sitcom Rab C. Nesbitt

== Other uses ==
- rab, the ISO-639 code for the Camling language, spoken in Nepal
- Rab (company), a United Kingdom mountaineering-clothing and sleeping-bag manufacturer
- Rab (G-protein), a cellular protein in the Ras superfamily
- Rab battalion, a World War II unit of Jewish survivors of Rab concentration camp upon their liberation
- Rab cake, a traditional Croatian cake
- The Rabs, nickname of Scottish football club Kirkintilloch Rob Roy F.C.

== See also ==
- RAB (disambiguation)
- Raab (disambiguation)
- Rabbi (disambiguation)
- Rabban (disambiguation)
- Raban (disambiguation)
- Rabana (disambiguation)
- Rabbani (disambiguation)
