= Rabanal =

Rabanal may refer to:

- Rabanal (surname)
- Rabanal, Cidra, Puerto Rico

== See also ==
- Rabana (disambiguation)
