= Rabanal (surname) =

Rabanal is a surname. Notable people with the surname include:

- Francisco Rabanal (1906–1982), Argentine accountant and politician
- Jesús Rabanal (born 1984), Peruvian footballer
- Raquel Martínez Rabanal (born 1979), Spanish journalist
- Rodolfo Rabanal (1940–2020), Argentine writer and journalist
- Rubén Rabanal (1935–1985), Argentine politician
- Cristian Rabanal (1978- , Argentina Padre, comerciante inventor y cocinero para la familia
