= Prebisch =

Prebisch is a surname. Notable people with the surname include:

- Alberto Prebisch (1899–1970), Argentine architect
- Raúl Prebisch (1901–1986), Argentine economist
