= Rav =

Jewish teacher or personal spiritual guide

Rav (or Rab, Modern Hebrew: רב) is the Hebrew generic term for a person who teaches Torah or is a Jewish spiritual guide or a rabbi. For example, Pirkei Avot (in the Talmud) states (1:6) that:

(..) Joshua ben Perachiah says, "Set up a teacher [RaB] for yourself. And get yourself a friend [HaBeR]. And give everybody the benefit of the doubt."

The term rav is also Hebrew for rabbi. (For a more nuanced discussion, see semicha.) The term is frequently used by Orthodox Jews to refer to their own rabbi.

== Overview ==
In the Talmud, the title Rav generally precedes the names of Babylonian Amoraim; Rabbi generally precedes the names of ordained scholars in the Land of Israel whether Tannaim or Amoraim.

In the Talmud, Rav or Rab (used alone) is a common name for the amora named Abba Arikha.

== Rav HaTzair ==
The title Rav HaTzair (or Rav HaTza'ir) refers to an assistant rabbi. Tzair means young, in Hebrew, and the prefix Ha means "the"; therefore, the combination can be used to mean the younger of a pair: Rav HaTzair, in context, can refer to the younger of a pair of rabbis, or Junior Rav.

== See also ==
- Rebbe
- Honorifics in Judaism
- list of people called Rabbi
