= Ghulam Rabbani (disambiguation) =

Ghulam Rabbani (Persian: غلام ربانی; transliterations vary), meaning "Servant of Rabbani", is a male Muslim given name in reference to Imam Rabbani. Notable bearers of the name include;

- Gulam Rabbani Khan, Indian freedom fighter, Indian National Army soldier
- Gulam Rabbani Taban (1914–1992), Indian lawyer and poet
- Ghulam Rabbani Agro (1933–2010), Pakistani writer
- Haji Ghulam Rabbani (1936–2008), Pakistani businessman and politician
- Ghulam Rabbani (died 2010), Pakistani footballer
- Golam Robbani Choton (born 1968), Bangladeshi footballer
- Golam Rabbani (Joypurhat politician) (died 2011), Bangladeshi politician from Joypurhat
- Golam Rabbani Helal (died 2020), Bangladeshi footballer
- Golam Rabbani (Netrokona politician), Bangladeshi politician
- Md. Golam Rabbani (born 1958), Bangladeshi politician from Chapai Nawabganj
- Ghulam Noor Rabbani Khar, Pakistani politician
- Abdul Al-Rahim Ghulam Rabbani (born c. 1969), Pakistani citizen held by the US military at the Guantanamo camps in Cuba
- Mohammed Ahmad Ghulam Rabbani (born c. 1970), Pakistani citizen held by the US military at the Guantanamo camps in Cuba
- Md. Ghulam Rabbani, Indian politician
- Md Golam Rabbani, Bangladeshi politician

== See also ==
- Ghulam (disambiguation)
  - Ghulam, Arabic male given name
- Rabbani (disambiguation)
