= RAB =

RAB may refer to:

- Aomori Broadcasting Corporation or Radio Aomori Broadcasting, in Japan
- Rabaul Airport, Papua New Guinea, IATA code
- Radio Access Bearers in mobile telephony
- Ramstein Air Base, Germany
- Rapid Action Battalion, elite unit of the Bangladesh police
- Redfern All Blacks, an Australian rugby league team
- Real American Beer, an American brewery
- Religious Affairs Bureau of China, a state body merged into the State Administration of Religious Affairs

== See also ==
- Rab (disambiguation)
