= Rabana =

Rabana may refer to:

- Rebana, a musical instrument from Southeast Asia
- Rabana Chhaya, a form of shadow puppetry from the eastern Indian state of Odisha
- Rapelang Rabana, South African computer scientist and entrepreneur
- Rabana-Merquly, a cluster of archaeological sites in Sulaymaniyah Governorate, Kurdistan Region, Iraq

== See also ==
- Raban (disambiguation)
- Rabanal (disambiguation)
- Rabban (disambiguation)
- Rabbani (disambiguation)
- Rab (disambiguation)
