= Rabban =

Rabban may refer to:

- Rabban, a Hebrew title higher than rabbi
- Rabban, a Syriac term for monk
- Joseph Rabban, 11th century Jewish merchant in India
- Glossu Rabban, a character from Frank Herbert's Dune (1965)

== See also ==
- Raban (disambiguation)
- Rabana (disambiguation)
- Rabbani (disambiguation)
- Rab (disambiguation)
