= Mariano de Vedia y Mitre =

Argentine politician (1880–1958)

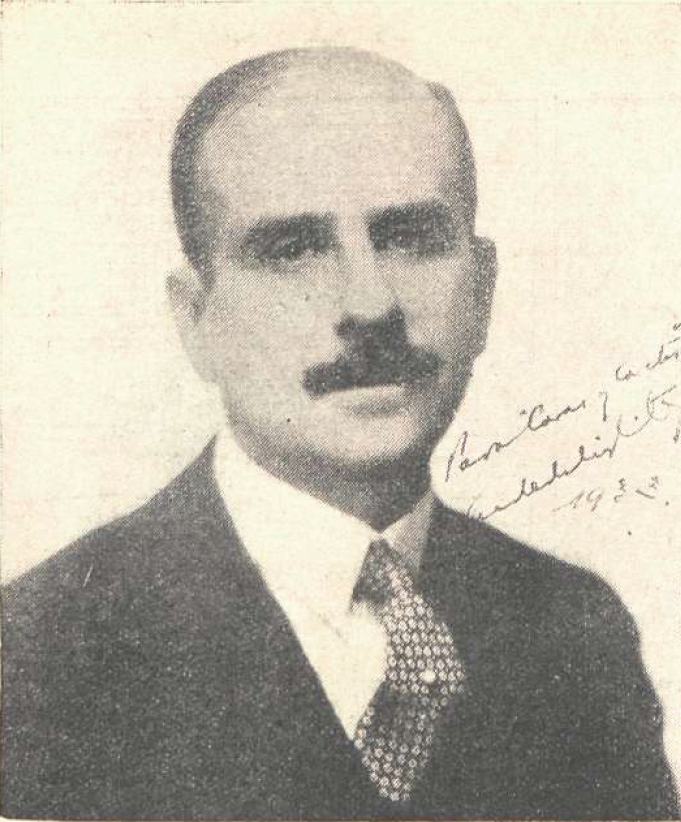
- Vedia y Mitre in 1933

Mayor of Buenos Aires
- In office 19 September 1932 – 19 February 1938
- President: Agustín P. Justo
- Preceded by: Rómulo S. Naón
- Succeeded by: Arturo Goyeneche

Personal details
- Born: 29 December 1880 Buenos Aires, Argentina
- Died: 19 February 1958 (aged 77) Montevideo, Uruguay
- Party: National Democratic Party
- Spouse: Helena Caronti
- Education: University of Buenos Aires

Mariano de Vedia y Mitre (29 December 1880 – 19 February 1958) was an Argentine lawyer, writer, historian, and politician who served as intendente (mayor) of the City of Buenos Aires from 1932 to 1938, appointed by President Agustín P. Justo. His tenure was marked by major public works but also marred by the CHADE Scandal, a corruption case involving fraudulent electricity concessions.

== Early life and career ==
Born on 29 December 1880 into a prominent Buenos Aires family. His father, also named Mariano, was governor of Corrientes and served as a national deputy, while his maternal grandfather, Bartolomé Mitre, was one of the leading figures of Argentina's 19th century history and served as president from 1862 to 1868. On his paternal side he was a descendant of Juan Martín de Pueyrredón, an early leader of Independence-era Argentina.

Vedia y Mitre earned his law degree from the University of Buenos Aires (UBA), where he later taught Constitutional Law and Political Law. He also lectured at the Escuela Superior de Guerra and several secondary schools.

His judicial career included roles as a civil and criminal prosecutor in Buenos Aires, judge, and member of the Court of Appeals. He was affiliated with elite social clubs such as the Jockey Club, Club del Progreso and Círculo de Armas.

== Political career ==
On 19 September 1933, Vedia y Mitre was appointed as Mayor of Buenos Aires by President Agustín P. Justo. Vedia y Mitre's six-year administration oversaw unprecedented urban transformation in Buenos Aires. His most visible legacy remains the radical modernization of the city's infrastructure, beginning with the monumental widening of Avenida Corrientes. This ambitious vision extended to healthcare infrastructure with the construction of Hospital Argerich and the foundational work on Hospital Fernández.

The administration's most enduring symbols emerged along the new Avenida 9 de Julio, where Vedia y Mitre inaugurated the Obelisco in 1936 as a centerpiece of Argentina's quadricentennial celebrations. Nearby, Plaza San Martín underwent significant expansion through the controversial demolition of historic buildings along Alem Avenue cliffside, creating the park's current expansive layout. Simultaneously, major engineering projects progressed, including the enclosure of the Maldonado Stream to create Avenida Juan B. Justo and the initial phases of the Costanera Norte coastal highway.

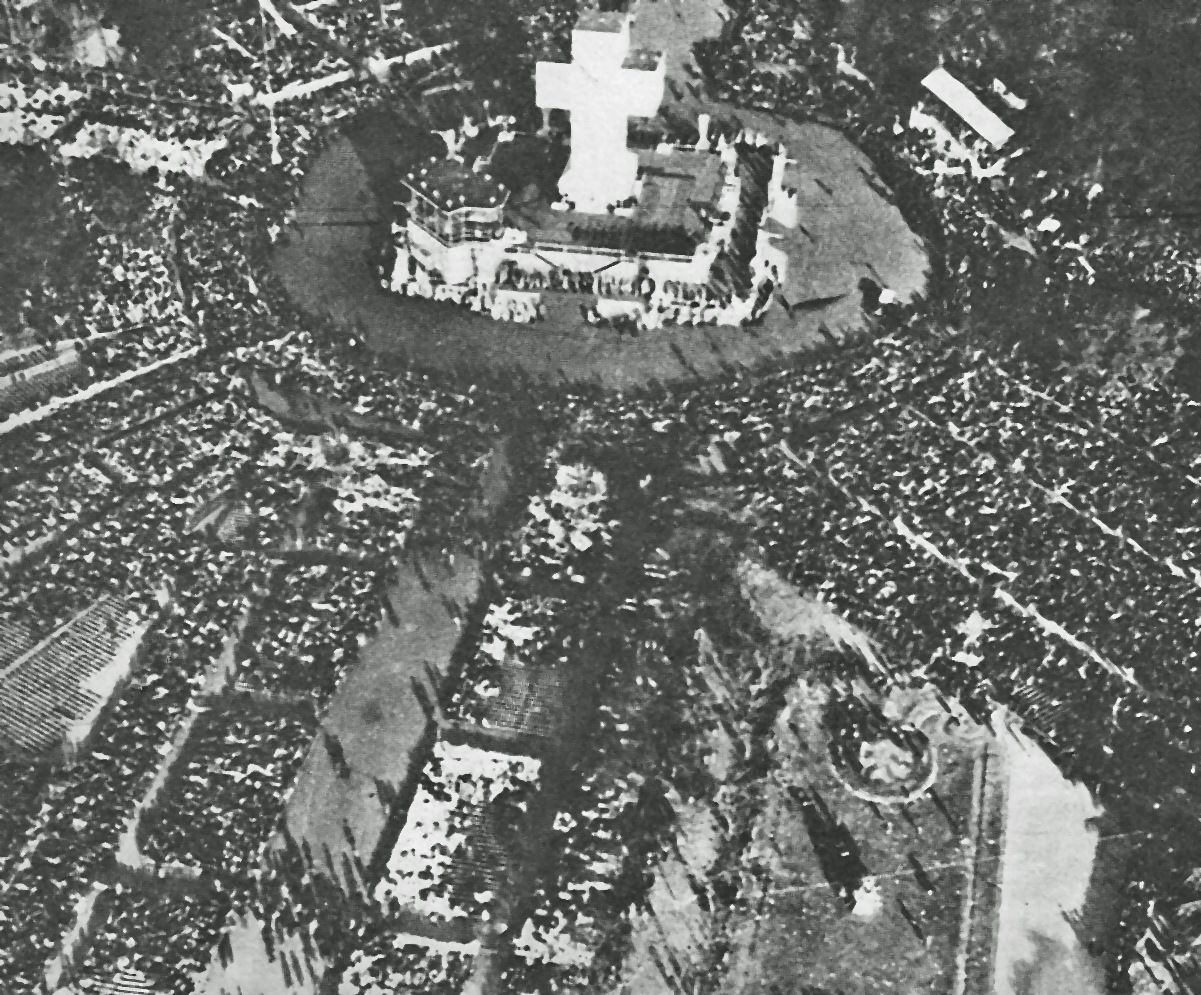
1934 International Eucharistic Congress, held in Buenos Aires during Vedia y Mitre's mayorship

These transformations occurred alongside significant cultural events that defined 1930s Buenos Aires. The city hosted the 1934 International Eucharistic Congress, marked by massive religious processions along Avenida del Libertador and the installation of monumental crosses on the under-construction Kavanagh Building. That same year, the visit of the Graf Zeppelin airship captured global attention, showcasing Buenos Aires as a modern metropolis.

However, this period of progress was overshadowed by the CHADE scandal, where Vedia y Mitre's controversial extension of electricity concessions (effectively granting private companies 90-year monopolies by negating reversion clauses) exposed systemic corruption involving bribes to municipal and national officials. This scandal would later become emblematic of the corporate-political collusion during Argentina's Infamous Decade.

== Later life and death ==
On 19 February 1938, President Justo stepped down and was replaced by Roberto Marcelino Ortiz, who appointed a new mayor for Buenos Aires, Arturo Goyeneche.

Vedia y Mitre died in Montevideo, Uruguay, on 19 February 1958. His remains were interred at La Recoleta Cemetery in the Caronti family mausoleum; in 1972 the entire family were exhumed and moved to Bahía Blanca, where they remain to this day.

Political offices
Preceded by Rómulo Naón	Mayor of Buenos Aires; 1933–1938	Succeeded by Arturo Goyeneche
