= Juan Carlos Goyeneche =

Argentine Catholic nationalist politician

Juan Carlos Goyeneche (6 January 1913 – 16 October 1982) was an Argentine Catholic nationalist politician. Also highly sympathetic to Nazism, during the Second World War Goyeneche travelled to Nazi Germany where he met a number of leading figures. He was the son of Mayor of Buenos Aires Arturo Goyeneche and the grandson of a President of Uruguay.

== Right-wing activity ==
During his time as a colonel in the Argentine Army Juan Peron had Goyeneche as his confidential agent. He was a close collaborator of the Ausland-Sicherheitsdienst, the overseas intelligence service of Nazi Germany. He was a prominent far right journalist, serving as the editor of the Sol y Luna journal as well as a writer for the Cabildo magazine. He was notorious for the anti-Semitism in his writing.

== European trip ==
In April 1942 Goyeneche travelled to Europe as a diplomat, ostensibly to attend a function of the "Hispanic Council", supposedly a cultural group established by Francisco Franco but in fact a front group set up by Enrique Ruiz Guiñazú and Mario Amadeo to send men into Axis territory. Goyeneche went to Madrid where he met with the Argentine ambassador Adrián Escobar and consul Aquilino López and the following the month the three crossed into France where they held a meeting with Pierre Laval, president of the collaborationist Vichy regime. In Paris Goyeneche made contact with Schutzstaffel officer Herbert Knochen who agreed to arrange for Goyeneche to make a trip to Berlin.

Before this could happen however Goyeneche and Escobar went to Rome where they held a meeting with Pope Pius XII. At this meeting they discussed the possibility of an Argentine intervention in Europe in an attempt to negotiatie an end to the war, as well as Escobar's Hispanidad vision of a new Spain-led sphere of influence in Latin America. The plan was not taken seriously anywhere, and met particular derision in Brazil where the press mocked both Argentina's delusions of grandeur and the pro-Nazi agenda of their diplomats.

== In Nazi Germany ==
Goyeneche finally made it to Berlin in October 1942 where he was placed at the Hotel Adlon at the expense of the Nazi state. Accompanied by Gottfried Sandstede, an old friend of Goyeneche who had worked in the German embassy in Buenos Aires before being expelled for his spying activities, he visited the Eastern Front to inspect the men of the Blue Division. Upon his return from Russia Goyeneche met Otto Reinebeck, the chief of the Latin American Bureau at the Nazi Foreign Ministry, and requested for him to arrange meetings with Adolf Hitler and Joachim von Ribbentrop.

On 30 November 1942 Goyeneche met with Ribbentrop at the latter's Westphalian estate, with the Hispanophone Sandstede present as an interpreter. The meeting lasted several hours and Ribbentrop suggested that Germany was favourable to Argentina's three main wishes i.e. closer trade between the two countries following a Nazi war victory, support for Argentina taking the Falkland Islands and encouragement of close links between Argentina and Spain. Despite this Goyeneche found Ribbentrop a wholly dislikable individual, dismissing him as "pedantic and close-minded".

Goyeneche's next meeting was with Walter Schellenberg, the head of the Ausland-Sicherheitsdienst, a group with which Goyeneche was already familiar. Under instructions from Ribbentrop, who hoped that Argentina might be enticed into the war, details of the meetings were allowed to be wired by telegram back to Guiñazú and Amadeo by Goyeneche. The heavily coded messages were nonetheless intercepted and translated by the US War Department.

Whether or not Goyeneche met Hitler during his time in Germany is a matter of some debate. The United States diplomat W. Wendell Blancke claimed that, while in service to General Dwight Eisenhower at the end of the war in Germany, he saw captured Nazi documents that described a meeting between the two taking place on 7 December 1942 at which Hitler reiterated Ribbentrop's pro-Argentina stance. A secret meeting in the Black Forest was also said to have taken place in 1944 amongst Goyeneche's friends. Goyeneche himself claimed that Ribbentrop had given him a letter written by Hitler but that no meeting had ever taken place. Reinebeck meanwhile, under interrogation, denied that there had been any contact between Goyeneche and Hitler whatsoever.

In January 1943 however Goyeneche did meet Heinrich Himmler after Schellenberg took him the eastern headquarters of the Reichsführer-SS. The discussion was largely limited to general ideas, although Himmler expressed similar supportive ideas as Ribbentrop and Goyeneche found him to be much more pleasing company than he had the Foreign Minister.

== Italy and Spain ==
Soon after the Himmler meeting Goyeneche left Germany and briefly returned to Spain to have lunch with Ramón Serrano Súñer. He informed the Spanish Foreign Minister that he intended to return to Rome to host a conference at which Catholic delegates from across Europe would meet to discuss how they could "integrate the Christian order in the New Order".

Returning to Rome he held a series of meetings with Monsignor Giovanni Montini as well as two more with Pius XII before eventually meeting Benito Mussolini. Goyeneche obtained a number of concessions from the Italian dictator, including a pledge to support Argentina's claim to the Falklands and a guarantee that he would obtain the same unequivocal support from Germany and Japan. Mussolini also publicly supported a plan to overthrow President Ramón Castillo and the 1943 Argentine coup d'état followed quickly after this pronouncement. Goyeneche also sought and received a guarantee from Mussolini that the Axis powers had no desire to end Argentine independence or that of any Latin American state, a common claim of Allied propaganda in the region. Mussolini also intimated that whatever shape South America would take after an Axis victory he envisaged Argentina as being the leading power.

Goyeneche spent the final months of the war in Spain and from his base in Cádiz he was in contact with Himmler until near the end. Indeed, it has been claimed that Goyeneche facilitated communication between Himmler and Peron at this stage.

== In Argentina ==
When Peron was overthrown in 1955 Goyeneche initially found himself remaining in favour as his close friend Pierre Daye had him appointed culture and press secretary at the Casa Rosada. Goyeneche and Daye however were soon persona non grata as the new government under Pedro Eugenio Aramburu decided to purge the Nazi sympathisers from public life. Nonetheless he was a strong ideological influence on the activities of the violent Tacuara Nationalist Movement that emerged in the 1960s.

He died in Buenos Aires on 16 October 1982.
