= Rabbani =

Rabbani may refer to:

== People ==
- Rabbani (Sufism), a follower in Sufism
- Ahmad Sirhindi (1564–1624), also known as Imam Rabbani, Indian Islamic scholar, jurist, and Sufi
- Ghulam Rabbani (disambiguation), multiple people
- Burhanuddin Rabbani (1940–2011), President of Afghanistan, leader of the Northern Alliance
- Faraz Rabbani (born 1974), Canadian Muslim scholar
- Hina Rabbani Khar (born 1977), Pakistani politician
- Mehdi Rabbani (died 2025), Iranian brigadier general
- Mohammad Rabbani (1955–2001), Taliban Prime Minister of Afghanistan
- Mouin Rabbani, Palestinian journalist
- Raza Rabbani (born 1953), Pakistani senator, leader of the opposition
- Wahid Baksh Sial Rabbani, Sufi saint

== Groups ==
- Rabbani (band), Malaysian nasyid group
- Jama'at-e Rabbani, Iranian branch of the Assemblies of God

== See also ==
- Rabban (disambiguation)
- Raban (disambiguation)
- Rabana (disambiguation)
- Rab (disambiguation)
