= Raban =

Raban may refer to:

Music and culture

• Raban (drum), a traditional single-headed drum mainly used in Sri Lanka, particularly in ritual ceremonies and Sinhalese folk music

⸻

Toponymy and history

• Raban, the historical name of the city of Araban, located in the present-day province of Gaziantep, Turkey

• Battle of Raban, a military confrontation that took place in the autumn of 958 between the Byzantine Empire and the Hamdanid dynasty, near Araban

• Raban, a village located in Albania

• Raban, an ancient medieval principality in Serbia, attested in medieval historical sources

⸻

Religious and historical figures

• Hrabanus Maurus (c. 780–856), sometimes called Raban, Benedictine monk, theologian and Frankish scholar, Archbishop of Mainz, major figure of the Carolingian Renaissance

• Rabban Bar Sauma (c. 1220–1294), monk, diplomat and traveller of the Eastern Church, famous for his embassy from Yuan China to Europe in the 13th century

• Rabban Hormizd, 7th-century Assyrian monk, saint of the Eastern Church, to whom the monastery of Rabban Hormizd, one of the oldest monastic centres in Mesopotamia, is dedicated (present-day Iraq)

⸻

Arts and literature

• Jonathan Raban (1942–2023), British travel writer, essayist and novelist

• Ze'ev Raban (1890–1970), Israeli artist, illustrator and designer, central figure of the Bezalel School in Jerusalem

⸻

Surname

• Raban, a surname found in various cultural areas, particularly in Europe and the Middle East, possibly derived from the Syriac term rabban (“master”, “teacher”, “monk”), an honorific title common in Eastern Christian traditions and historically attested in Anatolia and Upper Mesopotamia

== See also ==
- Ravan (disambiguation)
- Rabban (disambiguation)
- Rabana (disambiguation)
- Rabbani (disambiguation)
- Rab (disambiguation)
- Paco Rabanne (born 1934), Spanish fashion designer of Basque origin
- Raaban, artistic name of Robbin Söderlund, (born 1987), Swedish DJ and music producer
- Rabanus Maurus (c. 780–856), also known as Hrabanus or Rhabanus, a Frankish Benedictine monk and theologian, archbishop and saint
