= The Rabbi =

The Rabbi can refer to a specific individual

Judaism:

- Rabbi, meaning "teacher" in Hebrew.

Literature:

- The Rabbi (novel), a debut novel by American author Noah Gordon (novelist).
- Rabbi David Small, main protagonist in Harry Kemelman's Rabbi Small novels

Sports:

- Brian Horwitz, nicknamed "The Rabbi", American major league baseball player
- Moe Solomon, nicknamed the "Rabbi of Swat", American major league baseball player

Television:

- The Rabbi, an episode in the long running TV series In the Heat of the Night
