= Rab (nickname) =

Rab is a nickname, in Scotland a diminutive form (hypocorism) of Robert. It may refer to:

== Robert ==
- Rab Douglas (born 1972), Scottish football goalkeeper
- Rab Noakes (born 1947), Scottish singer-songwriter
- Rab Kilgour (born 1956), Scottish former footballer
- Rab Shannon (born 1966), Scottish former footballer
- Rab Smith (born 1950), Scottish former competitive darts player
- Rab Stewart (born 1932), Scottish former footballer
- Rab Stewart (footballer, born 1962) (1962–2016), Scottish footballer

== Other ==
- Rab Butler (1902–1982), British Conservative politician
- Rab Howell (1869–1937), English footballer
