= Rab (surname) =

Rab is a surname. Notable people with the surname include:

- A. S. M. Abdur Rab (born 1945), Bangladeshi politician
- Mohammad Abdur Rab (Bir Uttam) (1919–1975), Bangladeshi army officer
- Tibor Rab (born 1955), Hungarian footballer
