= Rubén Rabanal =

Argentine politician

National Deputy
- In office December 10, 1983 – January 23, 1985
- Constituency: City of Buenos Aires
- In office May 25, 1973 – March 24, 1976
- Constituency: City of Buenos Aires

National Senator
- In office October 12, 1963 – June 28, 1966
- Constituency: City of Buenos Aires

Personal details
- Born: 1935 Buenos Aires, Argentina
- Died: January 23, 1985 Buenos Aires, Argentina
- Party: Radical Civic Union
- Other political affiliations: People's Radical Civic Union
- Occupation: Lawyer

Rubén Rabanal (1935 – January 23, 1985) was an Argentine politician. He was born in Buenos Aires in 1935 and died on January 23, 1985. He belonged to the Radical Civic Union and was a senator and national congressman several times. His father, Francisco Rabanal, was mayor of Buenos Aires between 1963 and 1966.

== Career ==
Rabanal was a member of radicalism in his youth, graduating as a lawyer and then with a Ph.D. in Political Economy from the University of Buenos Aires. Within his party he held various positions. He was elected senator in 1963, practicing until 1966, when there was a military coup. During his years in the Senate he was also secretary to his father, who was, at that time, mayor of the City of Buenos Aires.

In 1973, upon the return to democracy, after the military government of the Argentine Revolution, he was elected local Member of Parliament and as secretary of the Radical Civic Union block in the House. In 1976, after a new military coup, he was again deposed from office. In 1983, with the return to democracy, he was again elected as Member of Parliament, presiding over the Budget Committee.

In 1984, already ill, he voted for the Treaty of Peace and Friendship between Argentina and Chile.

He died on January 23, 1985, at age 49.
