= Francisco Rabanal =

Argentine politician

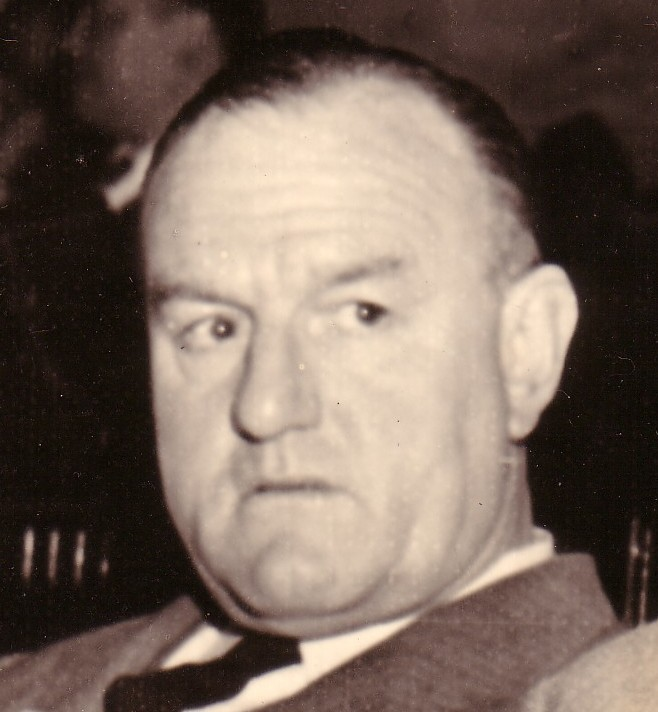

53rd Mayor of Buenos Aires
- In office October 17, 1963 – June 28, 1966
- President: Arturo Umberto Illia
- Preceded by: Alberto Prebisch
- Succeeded by: Eugenio Schettini

National Deputy
- In office May 1, 1960 – March 29, 1962
- Constituency: City of Buenos Aires
- In office June 4, 1948 – September 21, 1955
- Constituency: City of Buenos Aires

Personal details
- Born: August 12, 1906 Buenos Aires, Argentina
- Died: July 22, 1982 (aged 75) Buenos Aires, Argentina
- Party: Radical Civic Union
- Occupation: Public Accountant

Francisco Rabanal (August 12, 1906 – July 22, 1982) was an Argentine accountant and politician. He was born in Buenos Aires. He belonged to the Radical Civic Union and was Mayor of Buenos Aires between 1963 and 1966. He lived much of his life in the neighbourhood of Nueva Pompeya. His son, Ruben Rabanal, also went into politics, being a senator and Congressman on several occasions.

== Career ==
Rabanal became a Certified Public Accountant in 1932 at the University of Buenos Aires. He joined radicalism in his early youth. From a young age he held various internal positions within the party, confronting ideologically, during the infamous decade, with the then party leader, Marcelo Torcuato de Alvear. He was elected Alderman in 1938. He was Congressman in the periods between 1948 and 1955 and between 1960 and 1962. In both cases his term was interrupted by military coups. Upon excision of radicalism in Intransigente UCR (IUCR) and UCR del Pueblo (UCRP), Rabanal acceded to the latter.

When Arturo Umberto Illia became president of the UCRP in 1963, Rabanal was appointed Mayor of the City of Buenos Aires. He functioned in this office until June 28, 1966, the day of a new military coup. During his tenure, he rehabilitated 400 hectares of the old Bañado de Flores (Bathed in Flowers) by transforming them into the Almirante Brown Parque. Urbanization occurred in districts like Lugano I and Lugano II, among other works.

== Recognition ==
After 1966 he was inactive in politics. He died in Buenos Aires in 1982, at age 75, as a result of a long illness. His wake took place at the headquarters of the National Radical Union. Attending it, among others, were radicalism figures like Carlos Raúl Contín (Governor of Entre Rios), Carlos Humberto Perette (Vice President of la Nación between 1963 and 1966), Juan Carlos Pugliese and Anselmo Marini (Governor of Buenos Aires between 1963 and 1966).

The Intendente Francisco Rabanal Avenue, south of the city of Buenos Aires bears his name in tribute.
