= Obelisco de Buenos Aires =

Architectural structure

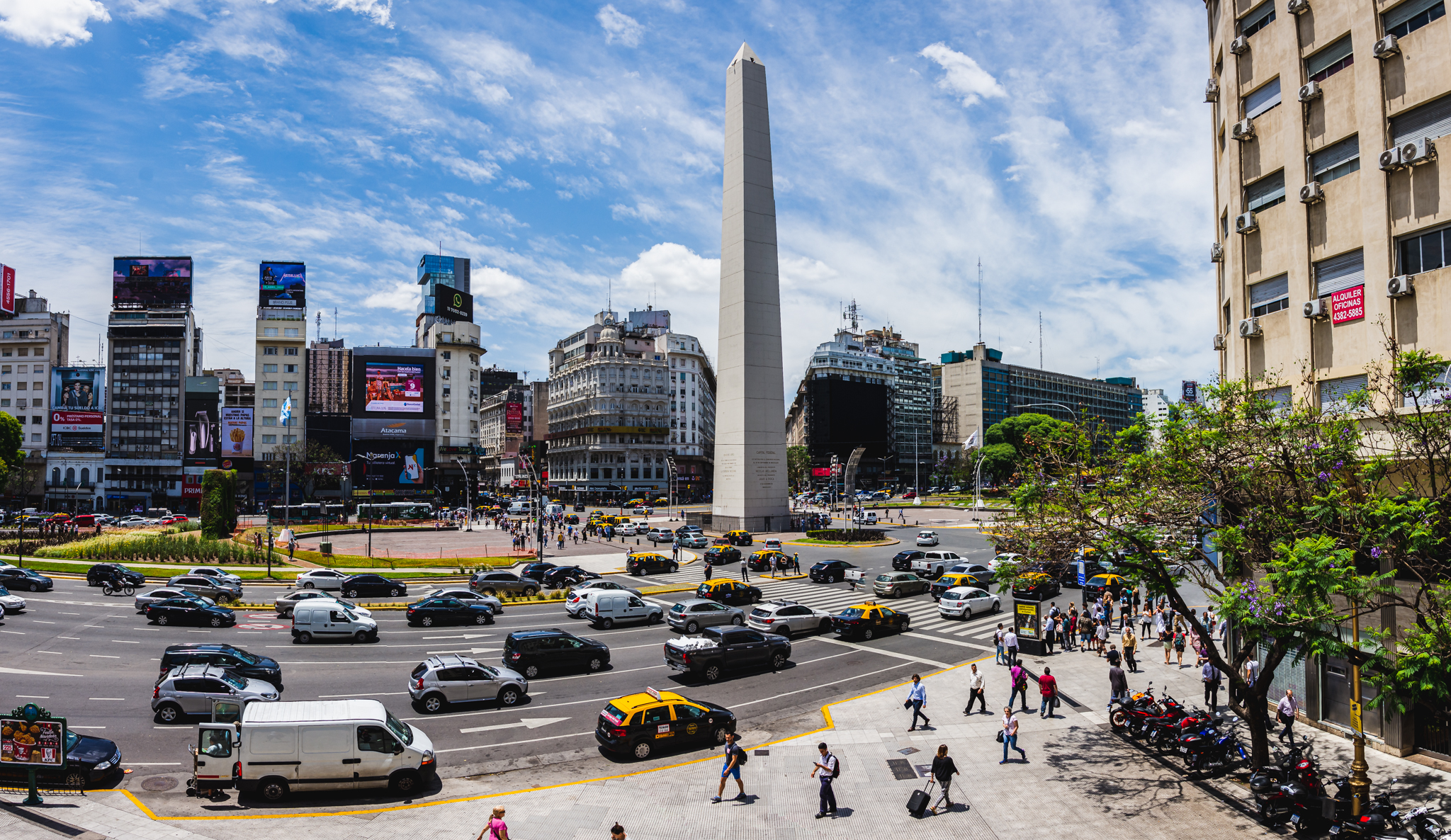

- Location within Buenos Aires
- 34°36′13″S 58°22′54″W
- Location: Av. 9 de Julio and Av. Corrientes, Buenos Aires

History
- Built: May 23, 1936
- Built for: Monument

Site notes
- Height: 71.5 meters (235 ft)
- Architect: Alberto Prebisch
- Restored: 2005

National Historic Monument of Argentina

The Obelisco de Buenos Aires (Obelisk of Buenos Aires) is a national historic monument and icon of Buenos Aires. Located in the Plaza de la República in the intersection of avenues Corrientes and 9 de Julio, the reinforced concrete structure was erected in 1936 to commemorate the quadricentennial of the first foundation of the city.

== History ==
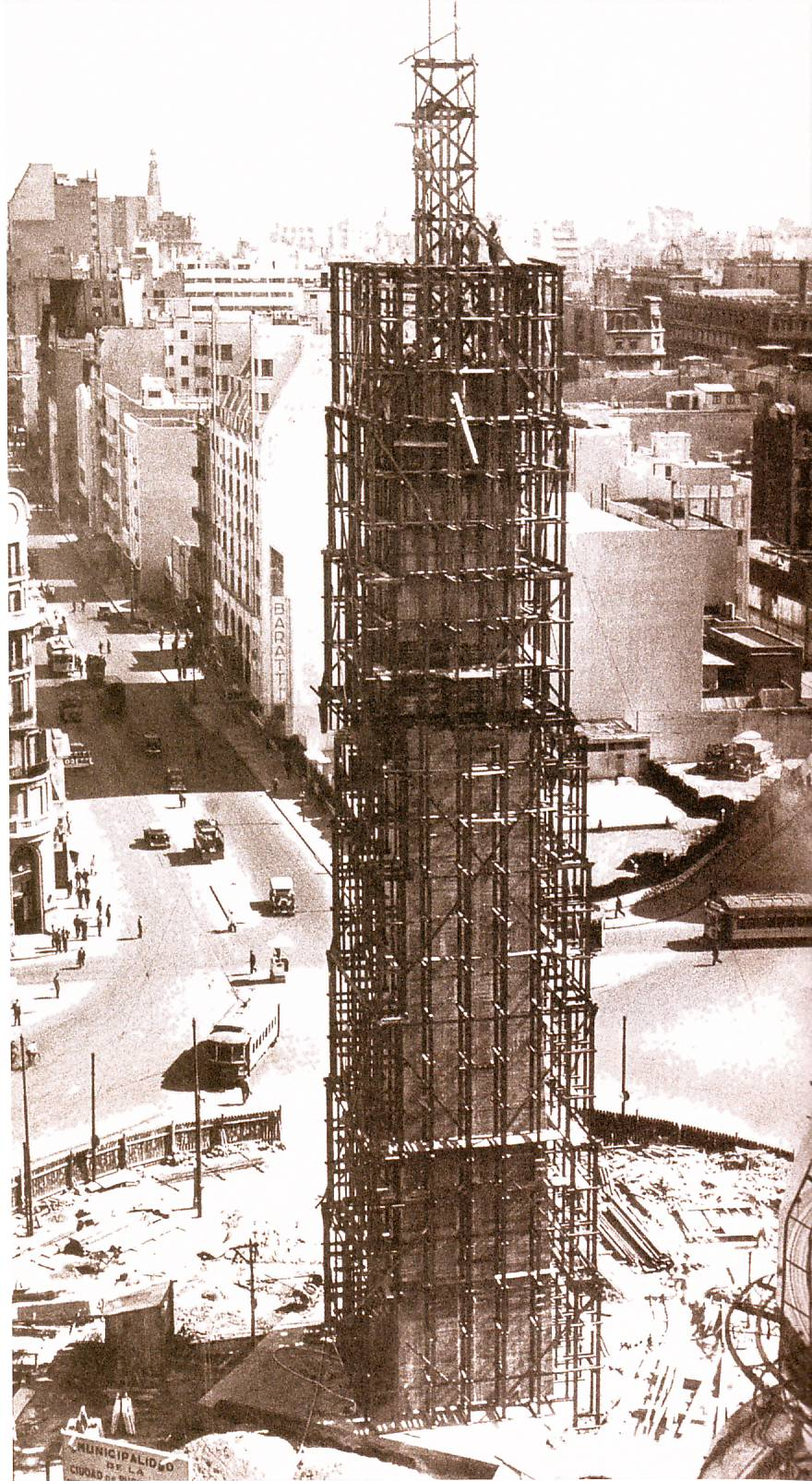
Under construction

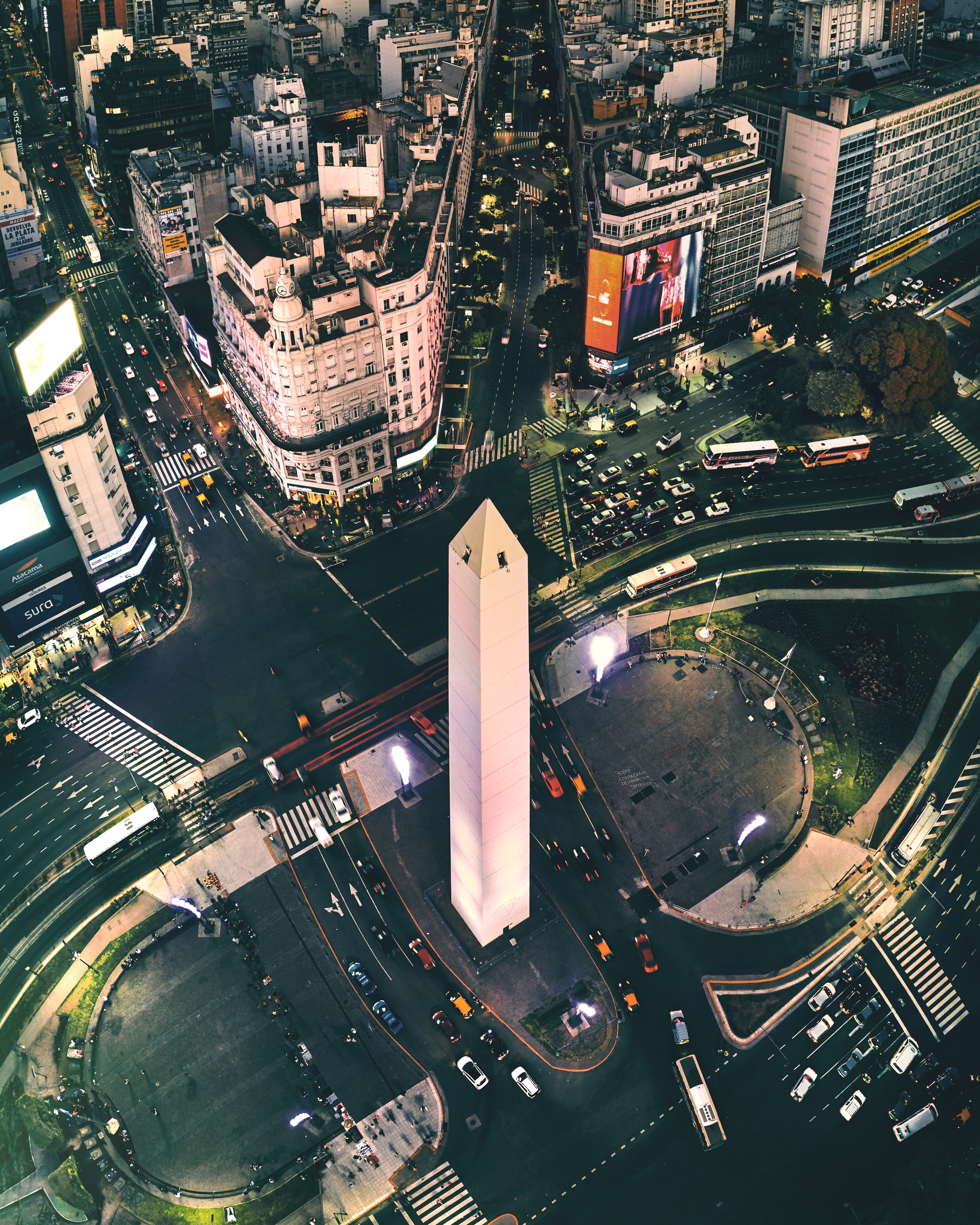
Aerial view of the Obelisco in 2018

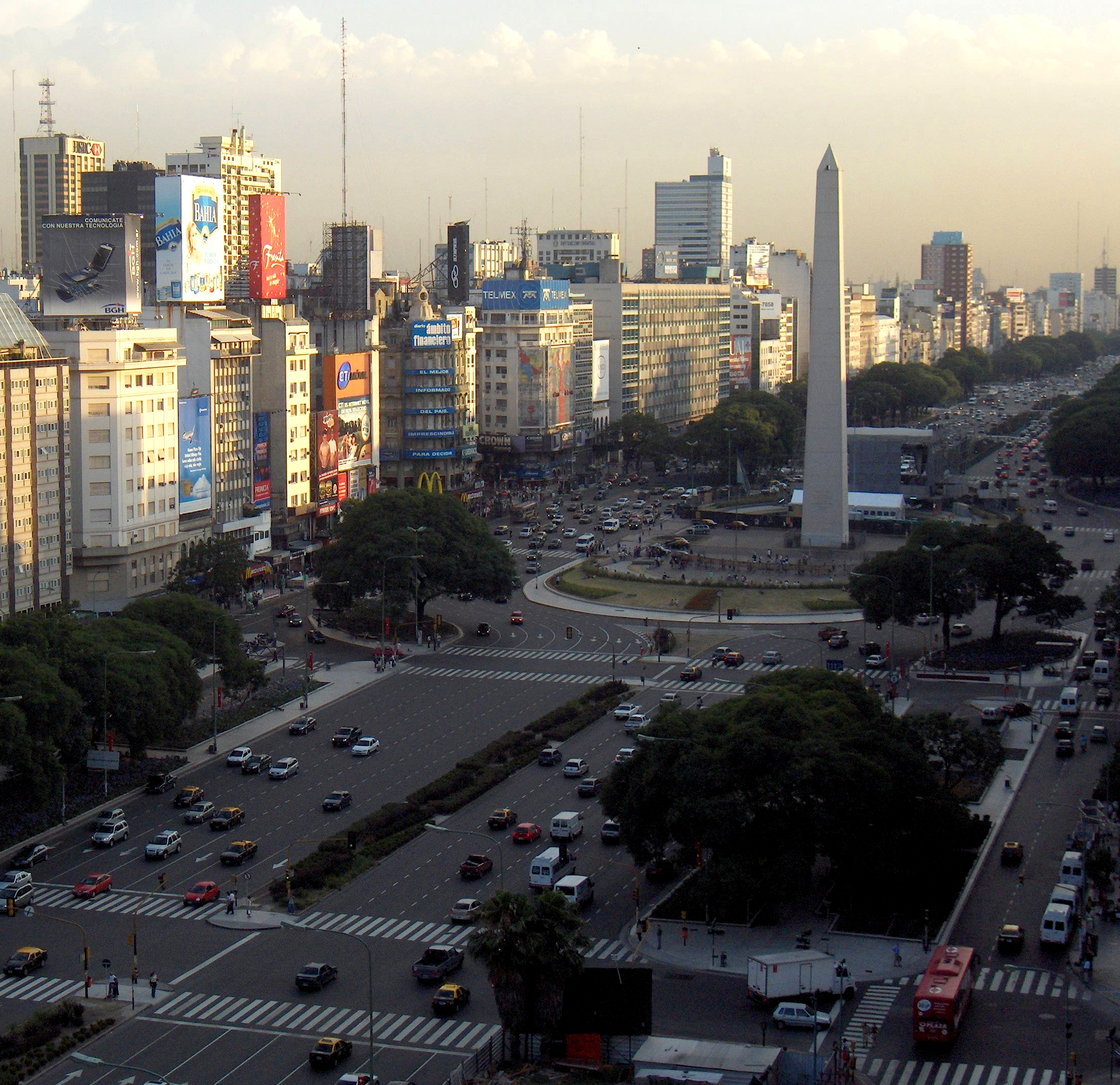
Obelisco de Buenos Aires and 9 de Julio Avenue

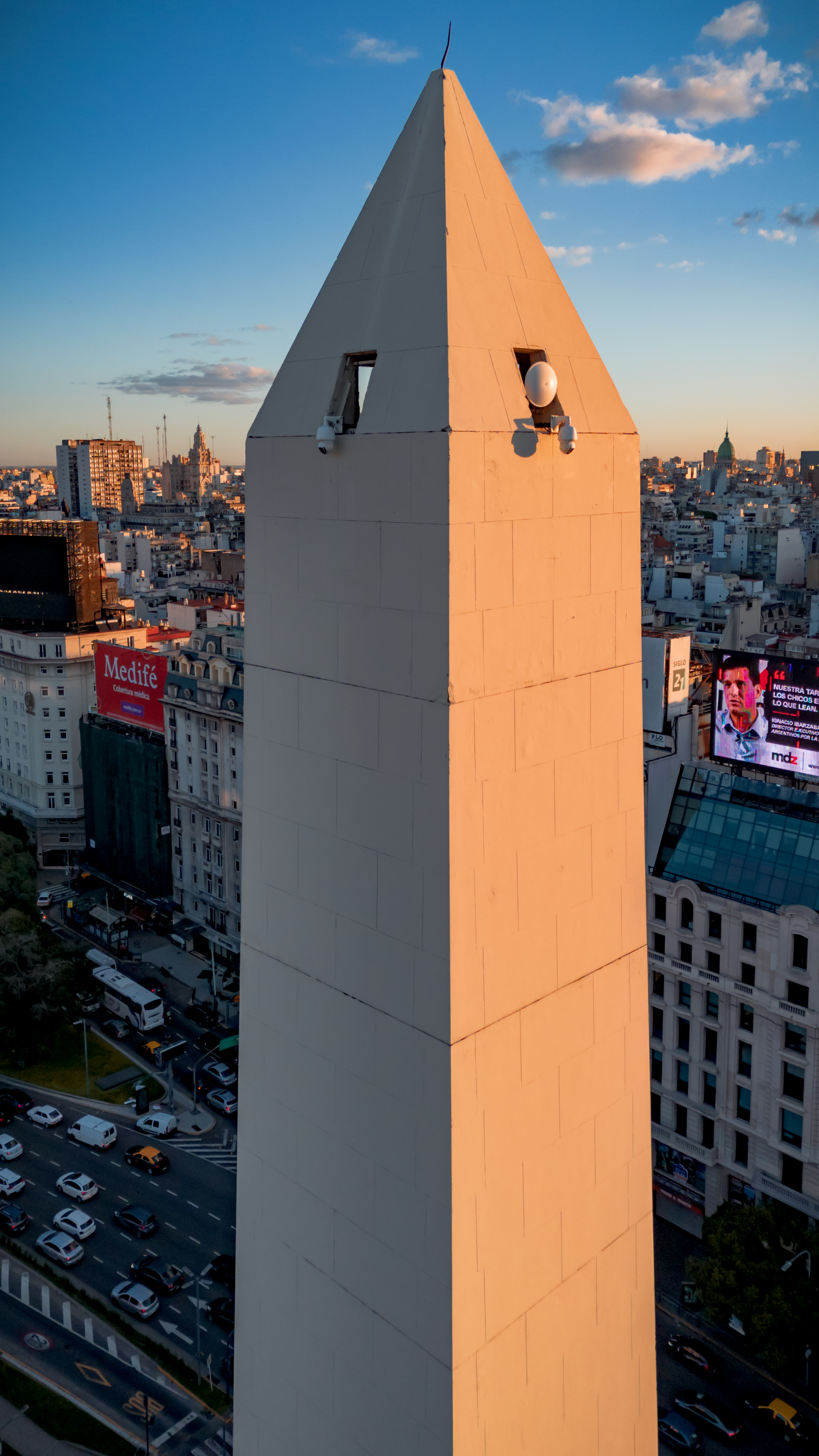
Top of the Obelisk of Buenos Aires

Construction began on March 20, 1936, and it was finished on May 23 of the same year. It was designed by architect Alberto Prebisch (one of the main architects of the Argentine modernism who also designed the Teatro Gran Rex, in Corrientes and Suipacha) at the request of the mayor Mariano de Vedia y Mitre (appointed by president Agustín Pedro Justo). For its construction, which cost 200,000 pesos moneda nacional, 680 cubic meters (24,000 cu ft) of reinforced concrete and 1,360 square meters (14,600 sq ft) of Olaen white stone facing from Córdoba were used.

The Egyptian-style obelisk was built by the German company G.E.O.P.E. - Siemens Bauunion - Grün & Bilfinger, which completed its work in only 31 days, using the labor of 157 workers. Rapid-hardening Incor cement was used and was built in 2 meters (6 ft 7 in) sections to facilitate the dumping of concrete.

Its height is 67.5 metres (221 ft), and 63 metres (207 ft) of these are up to the initiation of the apex, which is 3.5 by 3.5 meters (11 by 11 ft). The tip is blunt, measuring 40 centimeters (16 in) and ends in a lightning rod that cannot be seen because of the height; its cables run through the interior of the obelisk.

It has only one entrance (on its west side) and on its top there are four windows, that can only be reached by a straight staircase of 206 steps with 7 breaks every 6–8 meters (20–26 ft).

On February 20, 1938, Roberto María Ortiz succeeded Justo as president and appointed Arturo Goyeneche as the new mayor of the city. In June 1939, the city council sanctioned the demolition of the Obelisco, citing economic, aesthetic and public safety reasons. However, the ordinance was vetoed by the municipal executive power, characterizing it as an act without merit and juridical content, because it alters the state of things emanated by the executive power, and that it was a monument under the jurisdiction and custody of the Nation and is part of its heritage.

Where the Obelisk stands, there was a church dedicated to St. Nicholas of Bari; it was demolished. In that church the Argentine flag was officially hoisted for the first time in Buenos Aires, in 1812. That fact is noted in one of the inscriptions on the north side of the monument.

As a result of the detachments of sheets of stone covering, which occurred on the night of June 20–21, 1938, the day after a public event with the presence of president Ortiz took place there. It was decided to remove such cladding in 1943 and was replaced by another one made of polished cement, making cracks to simulate the joints of the stones. When the slabs were removed, a legend that said "Its architect was Alberto Prebisch" was also removed.

In 1973, it was decorated as a Christmas tree. In 1975, during the Peronist government of Isabel Perón, a ring-shaped, rotating sign encircled the obelisk with the revolving motto El silencio es salud ("Silence is health"). Putatively addressed to motorists who caused excessive noise, it was widely interpreted by Argentines as equating political acquiescence with safety from state terrorism and assassination.

Throughout its history, the monument has suffered vandalism, especially politically oriented graffiti. In the 1980s, an activist group broke in and spilled paint from the top windows, causing the city government to erect a fence around its base in 1987. This move stirred controversy, but eventually proved effective in reducing the number of defacing incidents.

On 1 November 2005 it was announced that a comprehensive restoration, financed by the Argentine painting and restoration industry association (Ceprara), was finished. The monument was painted with 90-micrometre acrylic paint to a "Paris stone" hue, deemed more pleasant than the previously used white.

On December 1, 2005, the obelisk was covered by a giant pink condom to commemorate the World AIDS Day.

To commemorate the 30th anniversary of the La Noche de los Lápices, the monument was converted into a giant pencil.

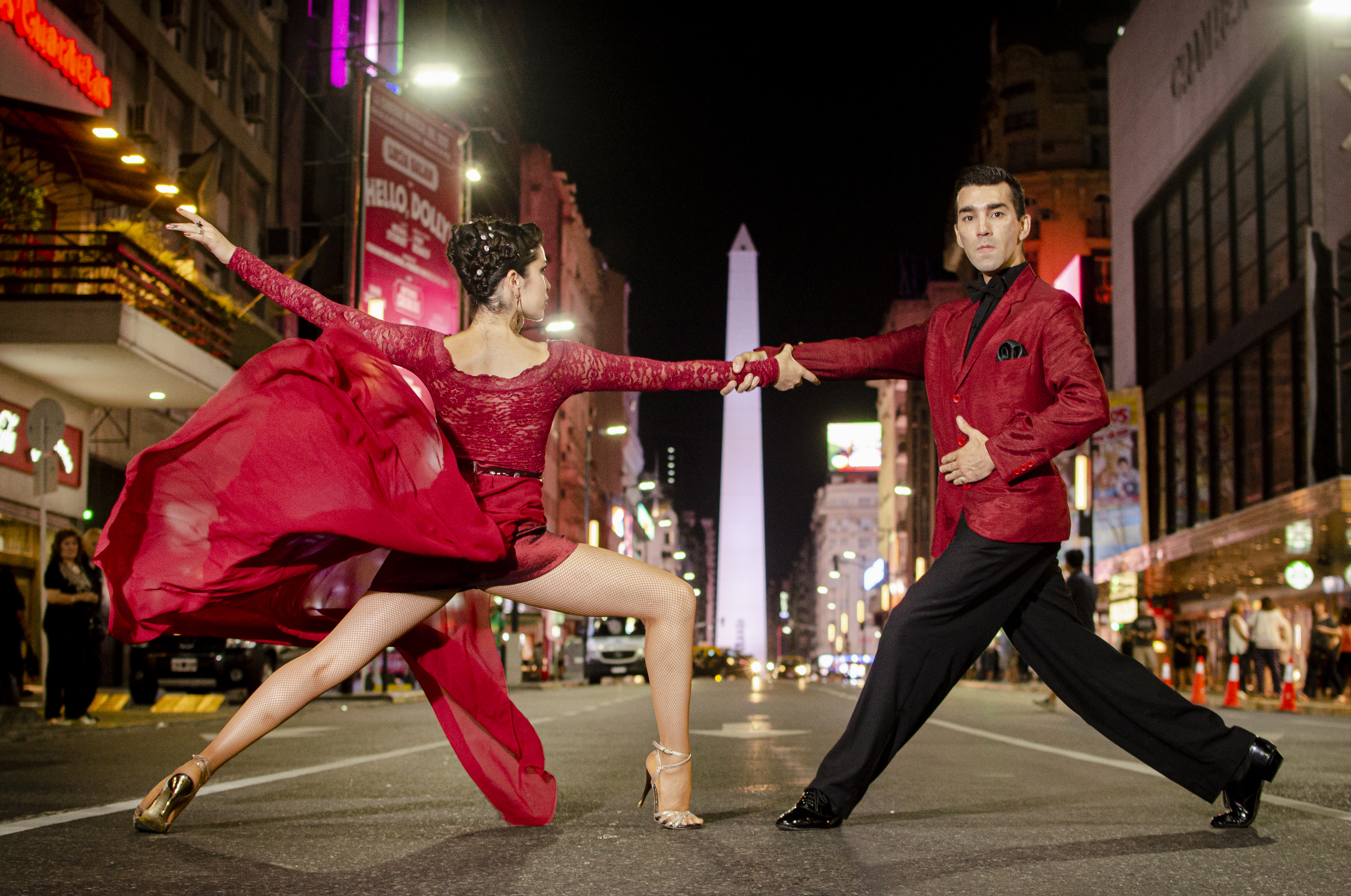
Because of its height, el Obelisco is visible from many parts of the city.

Lines B, C, and D of the Buenos Aires Metro have stations near the monument, and are connected by a number of underground passages with commercial galleries.

The Obelisco hosted the opening ceremony of the 2018 Summer Youth Olympics.

== Inscriptions on its sides ==
North side	West side	South side	East side
North side	West side	South side	East side
Translation: On this site in the St. Nicholas tower the National Flag was hoisted for the first time in the city the XXIII of August of MDCCCXII.	Translation: Federal Capital; Law enacted by the National Congress the XX of September of MDCCCLXXX initiative of the President; Nicolás Avellaneda; Decree of the President Julio A. Roca; VI of December of MDCCCLXXX.	Translation: Second Foundation by Juan de Garay; XI of June of MDLXXX. — Poem by Baldomero Fernández Moreno	Translation: Buenos Aires to the Republic On the IV centenary of the foundation of the city by Don Pedro de Mendoza. II of February of MDXXXVI.

At the base of the south face, in a very small rectangle, this sonnet written by Baldomero Fernández Moreno during a tribute dinner in the Alvear Palace Hotel to Prebisch:

El Obelisco

¿Donde tenía la ciudad guardada
esta espada de plata refulgente
desenvainada repentinamente
y a los cielos azules asestada?

Ahora puede lanzarse la mirada
harta de andar rastrera y penitente
piedra arriba hacia el Sol omnipotente
y descender espiritualizada.

Rayo de luna o desgarrón de viento
en símbolo cuajado y monumento
índice, surtidor, llama, palmera.

La estrella arriba y la centella abajo,
que la idea, el ensueño y el trabajo
giren a tus pies, devanadera.

English version:

The Obelisk

Where did the city keep
this shining silver sword
[that was] suddenly unsheathed
and into the blue skies thrusted?

Now you may take a look
[it] tired of walking low and penitent
stone up towards the omnipotent Sun
and descend spiritualized.

Moonbeam or wind tear
in immobile symbol and monument
index, fountain, flame, palm tree.

The star above and the spark below,
that the idea, the dream and the work
[may] turn at your feet, winder.

== Special occasions ==
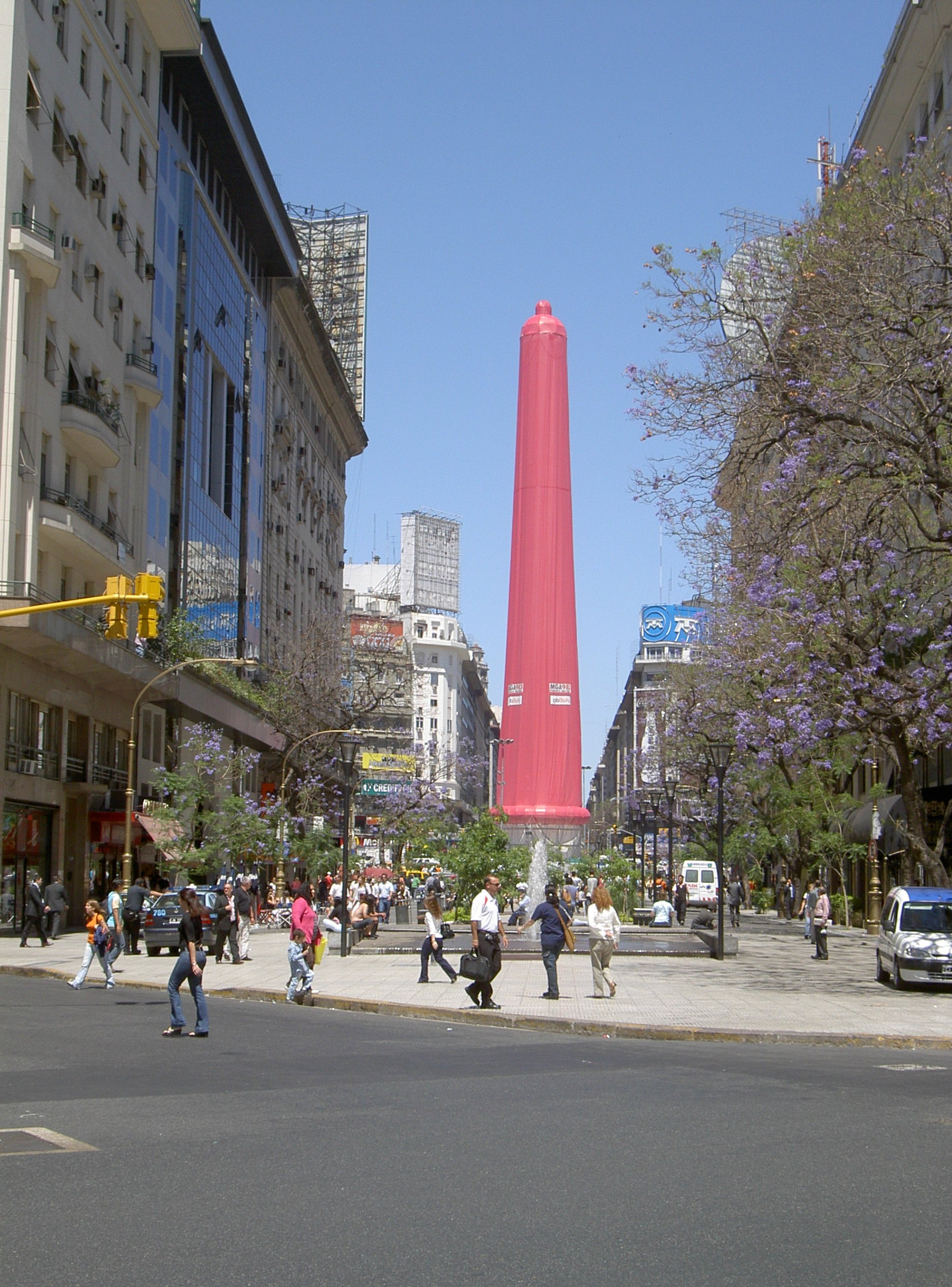
Covered by a condom on December 1, 2005, for World AIDS Day

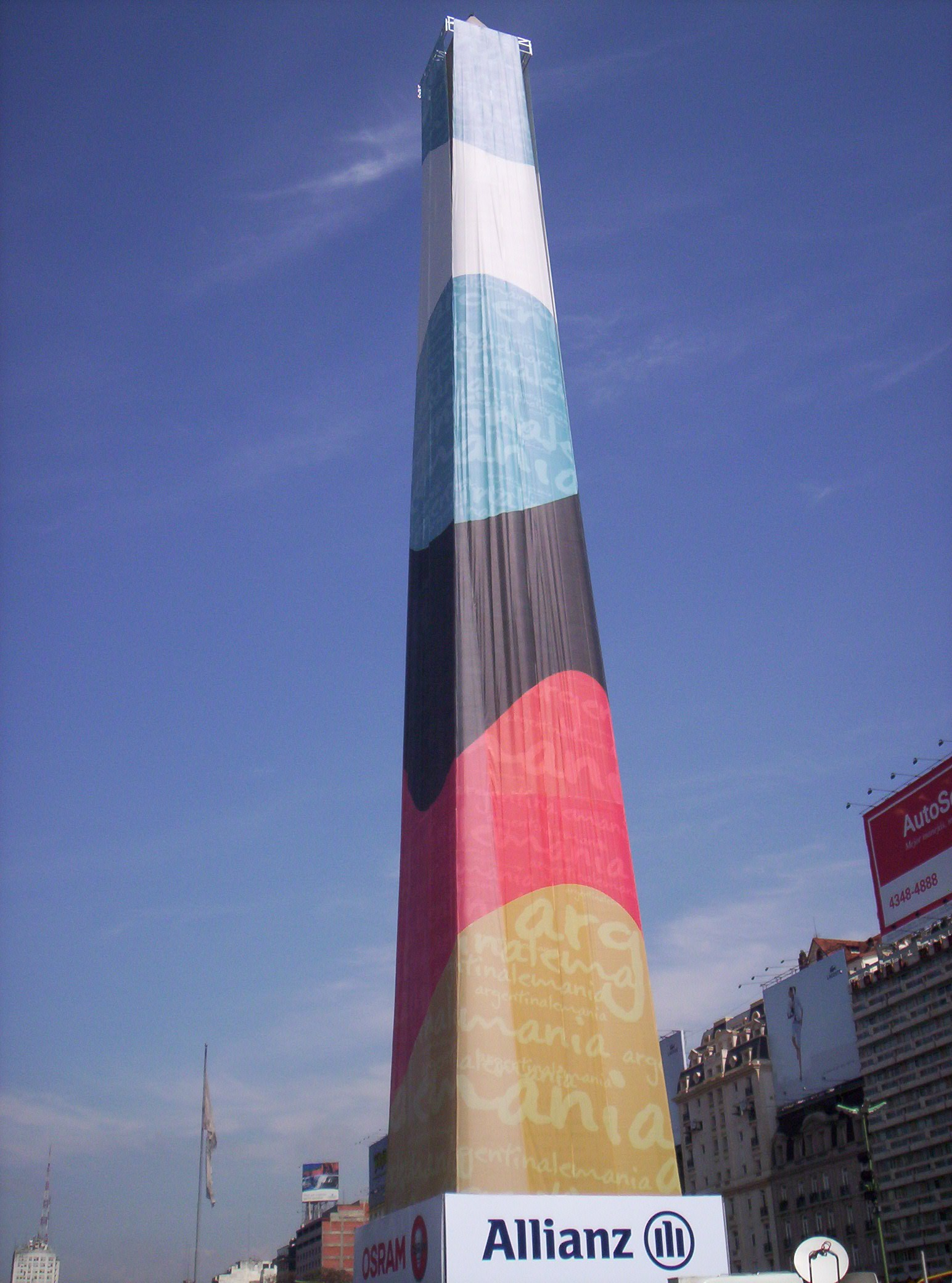
Celebrating 150 years of bilateral relations between Argentina and Germany on September 21, 2007

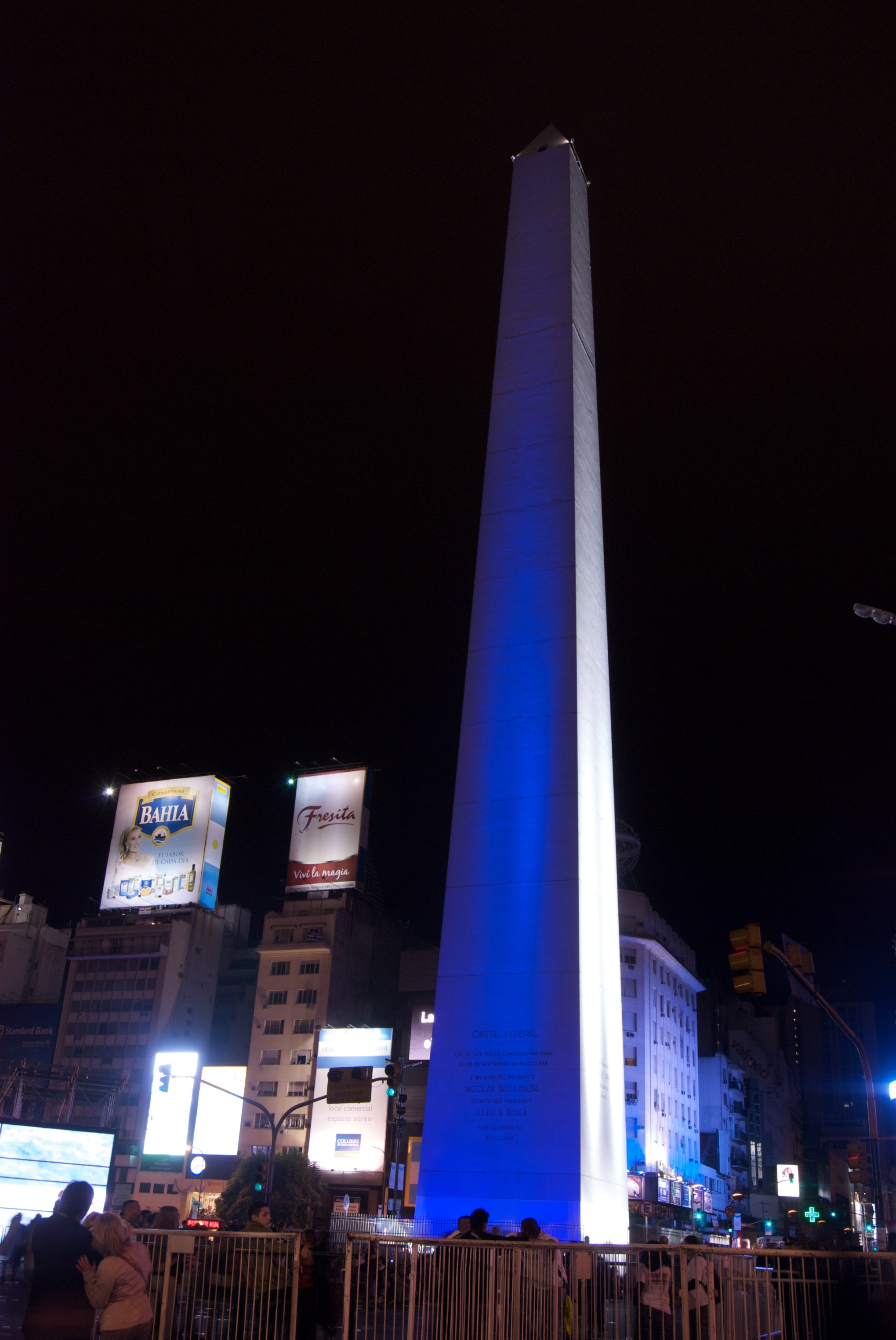
Celebrating the Argentina Bicentennial on May 23, 2010

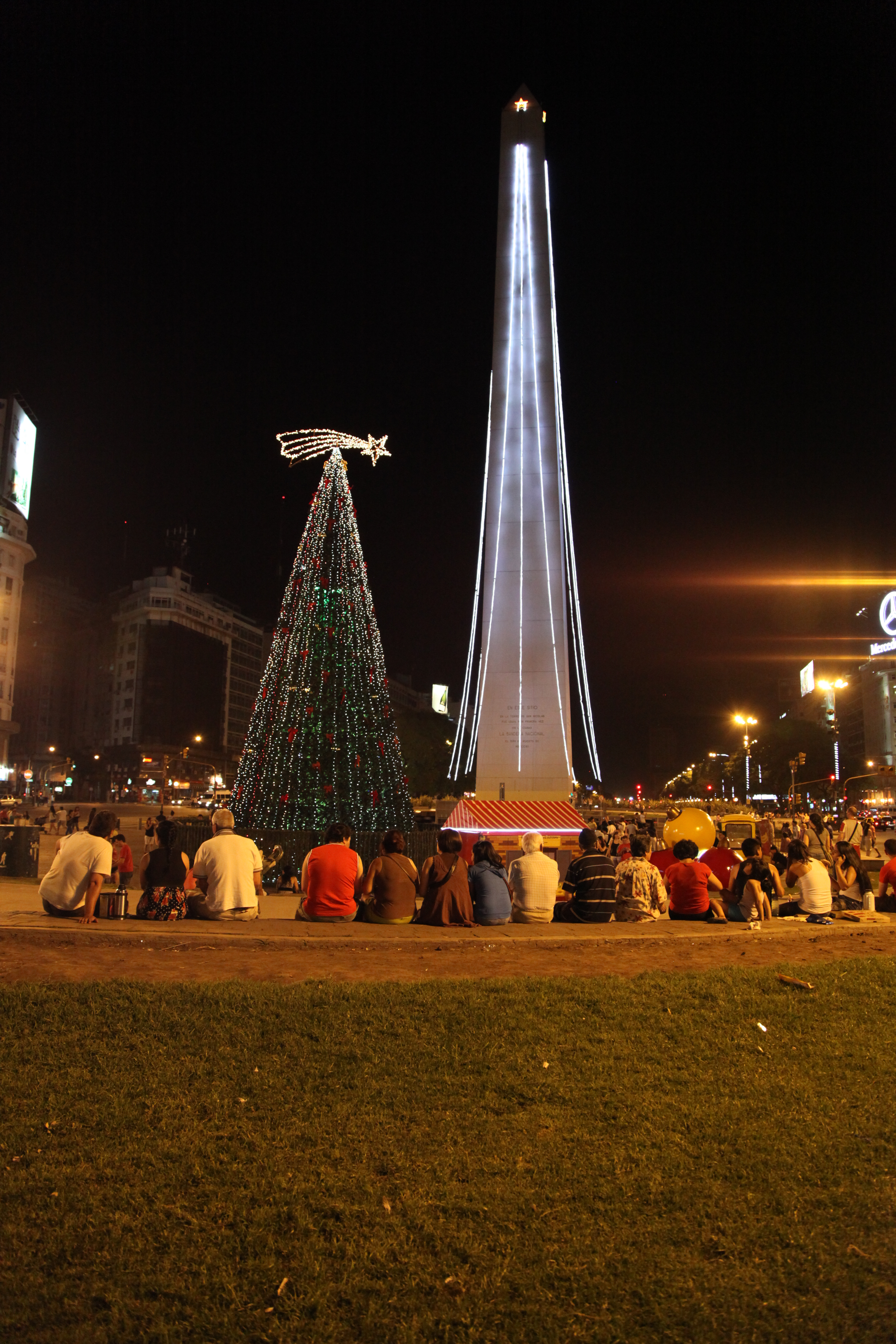
On Christmas night, 2010

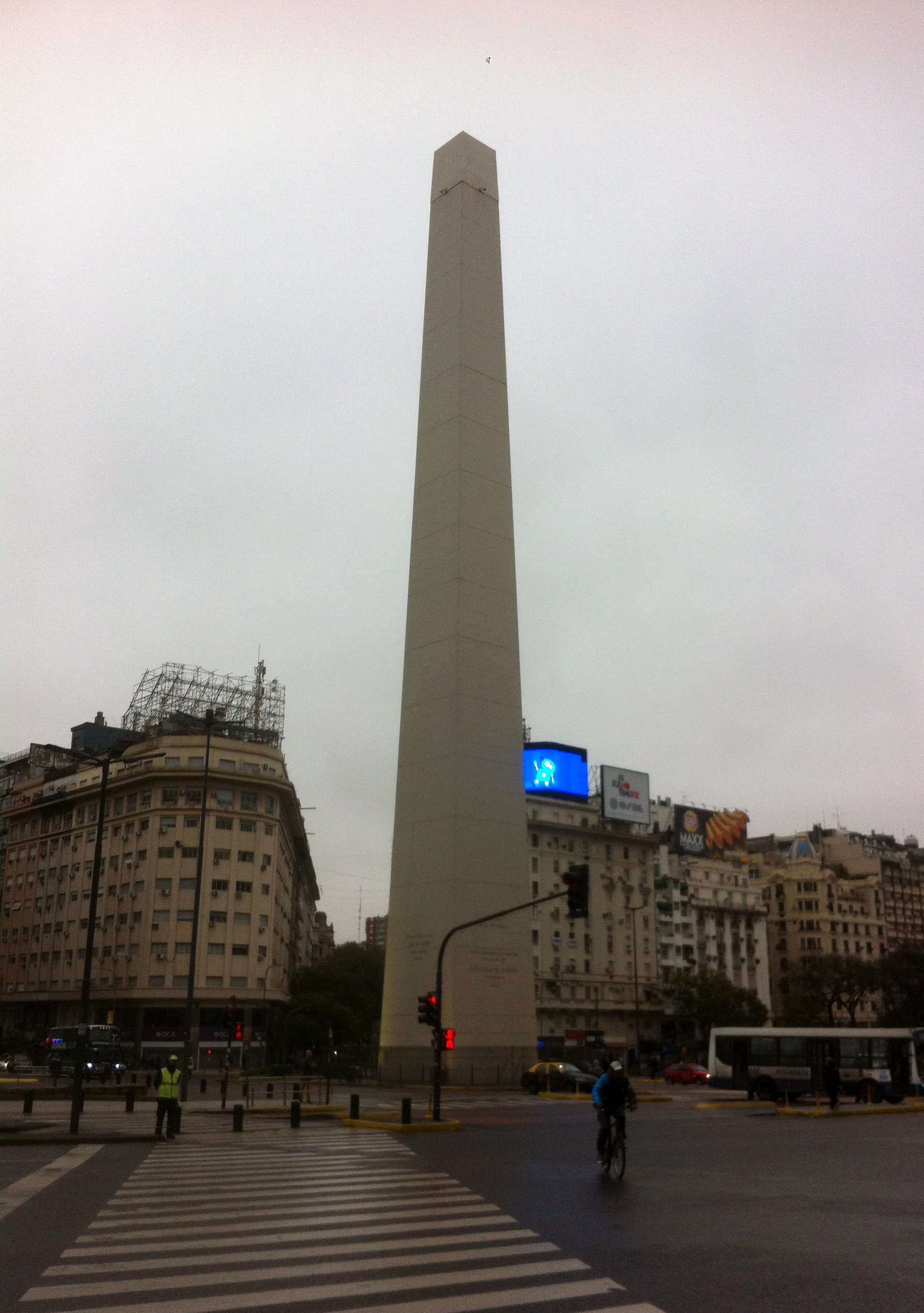
"Without peak", after the intervention of artist Leandro Erlich, September 25, 2015

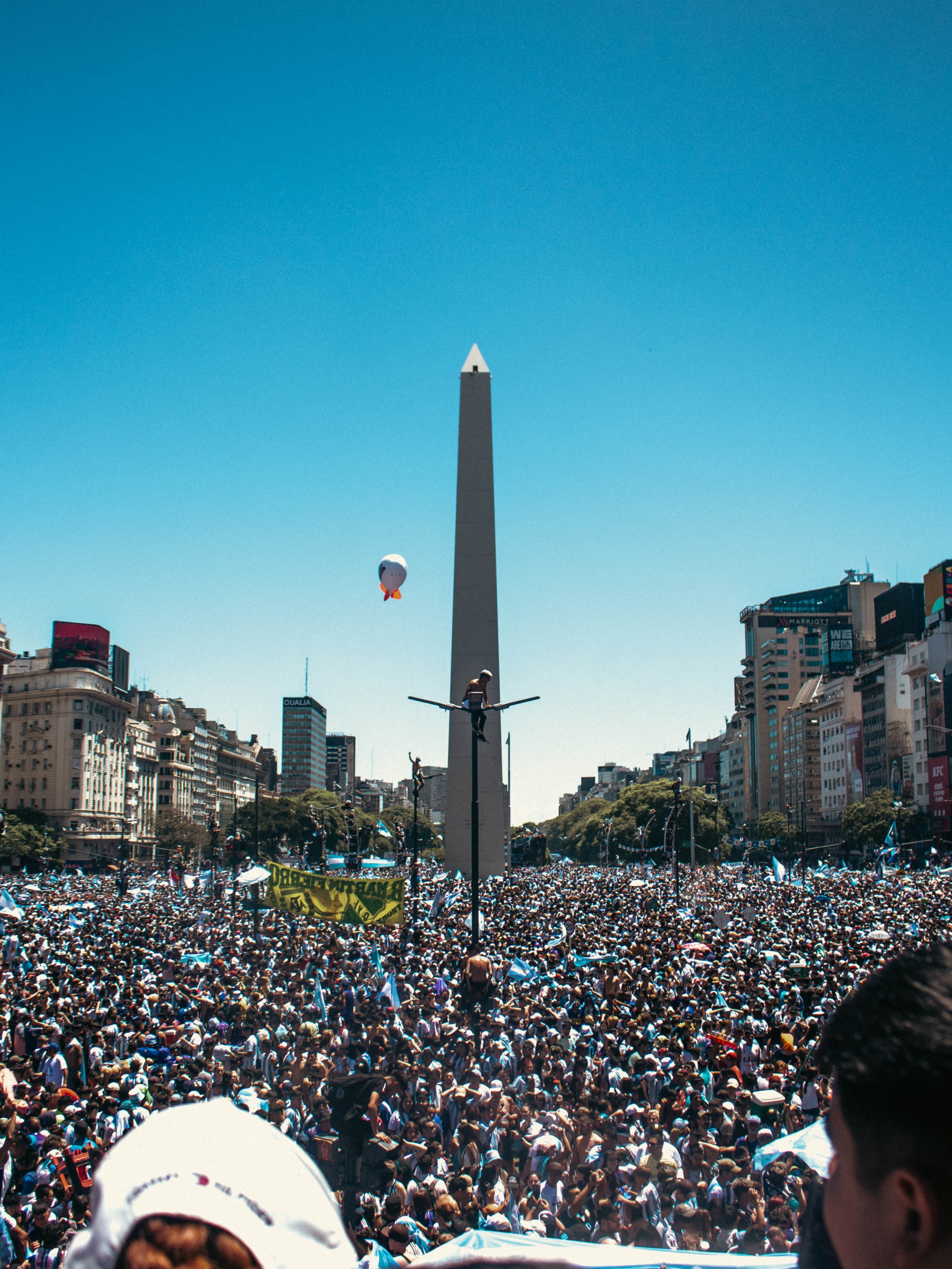
Millions celebrating world championship of the 2022 FIFA World Cup

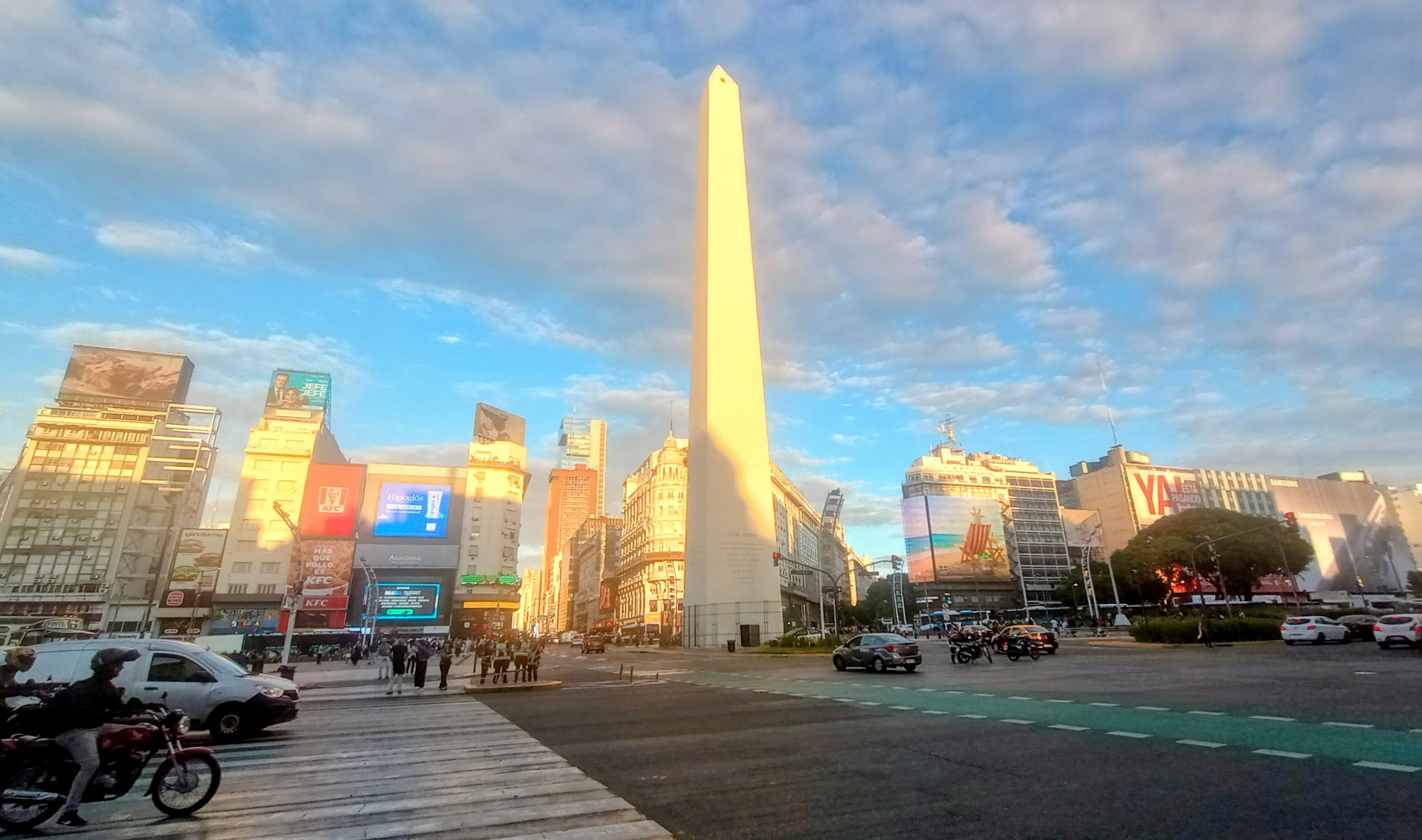
The Obelisk at sunset

== See also ==
- Obelisk of São Paulo
- Washington Monument
