= Haji Ghulam Rabbani =

Haji Ghulam Rabbani (1936–2008) was a Pakistani businessman and politician. Ghulam Rabbani was born on 1 May 1936, the son of Haji Sufi Barket Ali, in chak no.244 GB, Gojra, Pakistan. He studied at Morosipur High School. His forefathers came from Indian Punjab district Hushairpur in 1905.

He began his career as a farmer before going into business at the Gojra grain market. He went on to become chairman of Ghala Mandi traders in Gojra. He served the public in many capacities:

- Member of the Senate of the University of Agriculture, Faisalabad
- President of the Anti-TB Association of Gojra
- Chairman of the Ihtisab Committee in Toba Tek Singh
- Member of the Cost and Production Committee of the Punjab Government Agriculture Department
- Chairman of the Market Committee of Gojra

Served as a member Board of Directors of the Punjab Industrial Development Board .

He was first elected to the Provincial Assembly of the Punjab in 1988, and re-elected in 1993. He returned to the assembly for a third term in 1997. Ghulam Rabbani was elected as chairman of the standing committee on excise and taxation of the Punjab assembly. He was elected as niab zila nazim of the Toba Tek Singh district for five years.

His most notable achievement as a member Punjab assembly is to move the movement against Zila Tax. As a result Zila Tax was banned by the Chief Minister at that time, Shahbaz Sharif.
