= Carlos Alberto Pueyrredón =

Argentine politician (1887–1962)

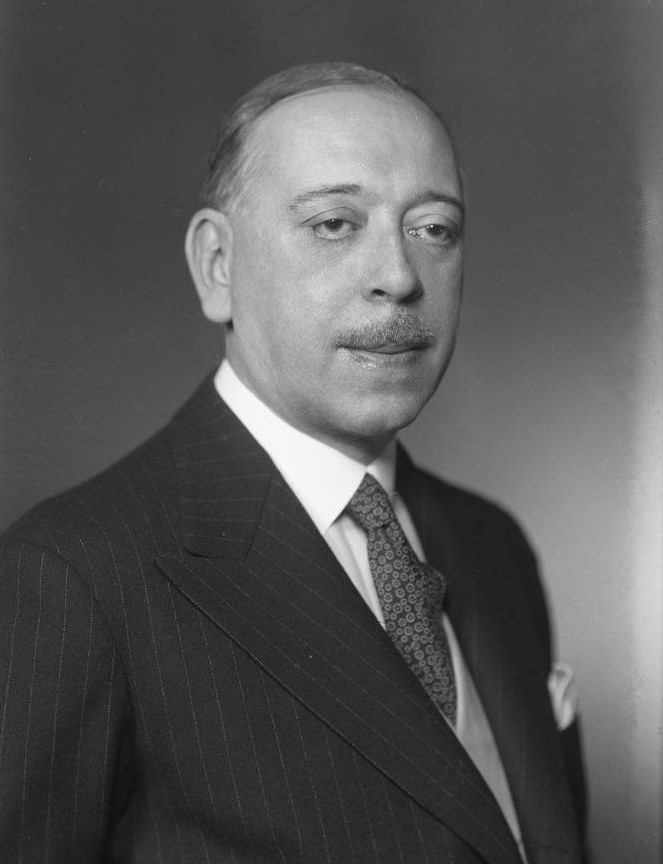
- Pueyrredón in the 1930s

Mayor of Buenos Aires
- In office 6 December 1940 – 11 June 1943
- President: Roberto M. Ortiz; Ramón S. Castillo
- Preceded by: Raúl Savarese
- Succeeded by: Ernesto Padilla

National Deputy
- In office 20 February 1932 – 20 February 1936
- Constituency: Buenos Aires Province

Personal details
- Born: 18 July 1887 Buenos Aires, Argentina
- Died: 16 June 1962 (aged 74) Buenos Aires, Argentina
- Party: National Democratic Party
- Other political affiliations: Concordancia (1931–1943)
- Education: University of Buenos Aires

Carlos Alberto Pueyrredón (18 July 1887 – 16 June 1962) was an Argentine jurist, historian and politician who served as intendente (mayor) of the City of Buenos Aires from 1940 to 1943, appointed by President Roberto M. Ortiz. A member of the conservative National Democratic Party (PDN), Pueyrredón also served as a National Deputy for Buenos Aires Province.

== Early life and career ==
Carlos Alberto Pueyrredón was born on 18 July 1887 in Buenos Aires, son of Julio Pueyrredón and Victoria Lynch García. His father was a political leader within the Mitrist faction and a scion of the Pueyrredón family; Carlos Alberto was a grand-nephew of Juan Martín de Pueyrredón and a nephew of Honorio Pueyrredón.

He finished his primary and secondary education at an English school and the Nacional Norte de Buenos Aires. Afterwards, he enrolled at the University of Buenos Aires Faculty of Law, where he graduated as a lawyer in 1910. He joined the ranks of the Radical Civic Union (UCR) aged 19, later switching allegiance to the Antipersonalist UCR and finally to the National Democratic Party.

== Political career ==
In 1920, President Marcelo T. de Alvear appointed him as Argentina's delegate to the League of Nations. Following this diplomatic role, he was elected National Deputy for the National Democratic Party in 1932. The following year, he served as Special Envoy to Italy, representing Argentine interests abroad.

Appointed by President Ramón S. Castillo, he served as Mayor of Buenos Aires from 6 December 1940, to 11 June 1943. His administration implemented fiscal reforms that stabilized municipal finances while undertaking significant social and cultural initiatives. Key infrastructure projects included the inauguration of Hospital Fernández and the advancement of Hospital Argerich's construction. His cultural legacy included the acquisition and conversion of the Noel family residence into the Isaac Fernández Blanco Museum, housing important decorative art collections. Additionally, he purchased the historic Saavedra Zelaya estate on Avenida General Paz, which was rapidly restored and inaugurated as the Museo Histórico Brigadier General Cornelio de Saavedra within two months, largely through the efforts of his wife.

He resigned from office following the 1943 Revolution. A plaza in Palermo bears his name and bust.

== Work as historian ==
Pueyrredón's bibliography comprises 144 publications, including books, pamphlets, articles, and scholarly works. His research focused on precursors to independence, particularly the Venezuelan revolutionary Francisco de Miranda and his ideological influence in the Río de la Plata region. In 1934, he was appointed as a full member of the Junta de Historia y Numismática Americana (later renamed the National Academy of History). By late 1959, he assumed the presidency of this institution and chaired the Third International Congress of American History in October 1960, which hosted over 300 delegates from Europe and the Americas.

== Personal life ==
He married Silvia María Dolores Saavedra Lamas in 1915, establishing a family that would include four children: Silvia P. de Elizalde (1916–1987), Julio Alberto (1918–2007), Victoria (1920–2008), and Inés P. de Amadeo. He died in Buenos Aires on 16 July 1962, predeceasing his wife, who passed away in 1975.

Political offices
Preceded by Raúl Savarese	Mayor of Buenos Aires; 1940–1943	Succeeded by Ernesto Padilla
