= Alberto Prebisch =

Argentine architect

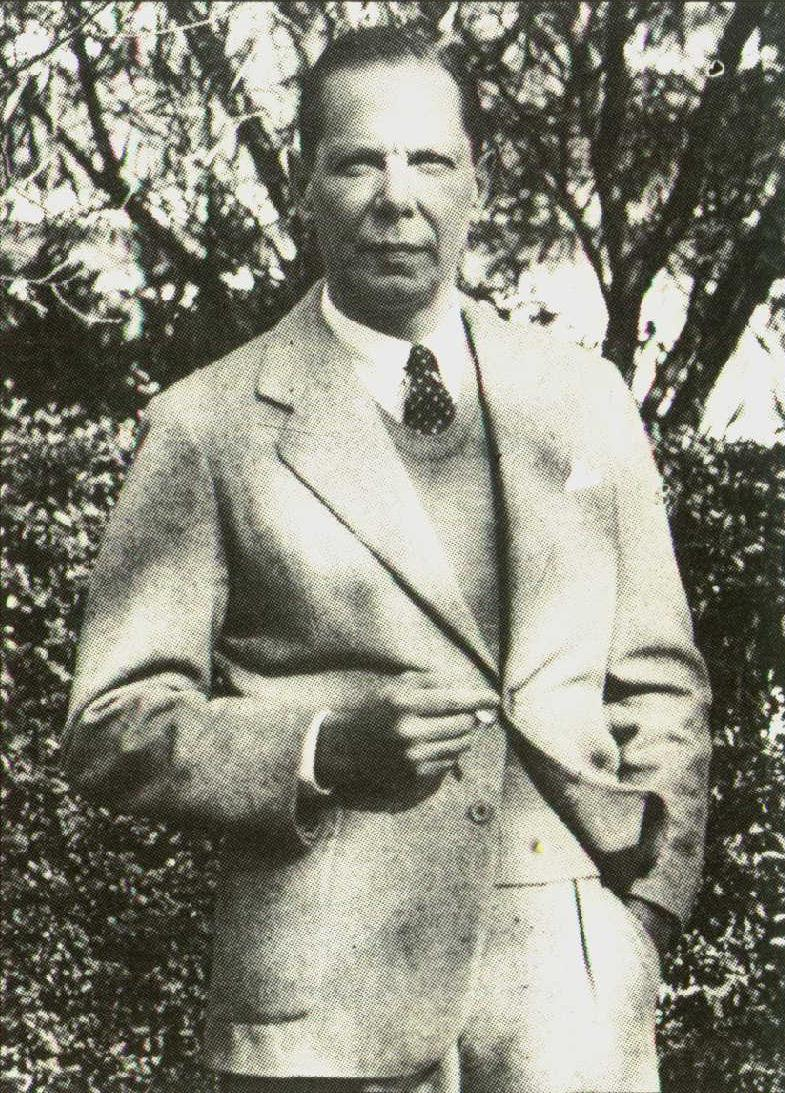

51 Mayor of Buenos Aires
- In office June 26, 1962 – October 13, 1963
- President: José María Guido
- Preceded by: Hernán Giralt
- Succeeded by: Francisco Rabanal

Personal details
- Born: February 1, 1899 Buenos Aires, Argentina
- Died: October 13, 1970 (aged 71) Buenos Aires, Argentina
- Party: Independent
- Education: University of Buenos Aires
- Profession: Architect, politician

Alberto Prebisch (February 1, 1899 – October 13, 1970) was a distinguished Argentine architect whose numerous works included private houses, apartment and office blocks, cinemas, shops and banks. Prebisch was born in Tucumán, Argentina, to German settlers his brother Raúl Prebisch was a well-known economist.

== Education ==
Prebisch studied at the School of Architecture at the University of Buenos Aires, where guided by professors including René Karman and Pablo Hary, he graduated in 1921. Upon completing his degree he moved to Paris for two years to complete his training. In Paris he followed the artistic and architectural development of the immediate postwar period in the company of other Argentine artists and architects such as Juan José Castro and Ernesto Vautier. Two key figures in Prebisch's development were Paul Valéry and Tony Garnier, both of whom he interviewed. Valery argued that architects are in the category of intellectual "responsible for the great act of building." Garnier focused on the communion between architecture and urbanism, as fundamental characteristic of modernity.

== Early work ==
He returned to Argentina in 1924 and presented the project "Sugar City in the province of Tucumán" at the Salon de Bellas Artes. This proposal tried to recreate, on a local scale, the model and modality used by Gamier in France. In 1924 he also began his writing, publishing his interview with Paul Valéry. He also made his debut as an art critic and, as a proponent of modernism, started to write in different media about architecture and urban planning, art and music.

With Ernesto Vautier he completed the Market of Tucumán in 1927 though it was an inevitable concession to time and place conceived in a neo-colonial style. Corbusier visited Argentina at this time and it was during this visit that Prebisch formed a bond with Victoria Ocampo. In 1931 he completed what was the first paradigm of a modern house in Argentina, that of his brother Raúl Prebisch, on Luis Maria Campos Avenue, which has since been demolished.

Prebisch won a scholarship grant from the Ambassador of the United States in Argentina, Robert Woods BIiss, and between the end of 1933 and the middle of 1934 completed a stay of several months in the United States. Based in New York, he visited several cities on the East Coast to analyze the architecture of museums and concert halls in that country. He was impressed with the dimensions, pragmatism, and aesthetic bias of modern American architecture developments which was to have a lasting impression in his work.

== Major works ==
In the years immediately after his return to Argentina, Prebisch completed his two most famous work both in Buenos Aires. In 1936 he was entrusted with the project of a monument for the Plaza de la República in commemoration of the fourth centenary of the founding of Buenos Aires. The result was the construction of the now iconic Obelisk of Buenos Aires - based on the a return to the sources of classicism in geometry. These premises were common to the plan of Washington D.C, which was being completed during Prebisch's visit. There is a clear influence on Buenos Aires complex from the obelisk and to the mega-architecture of the Federal Triangle of the North American capital.

His other major work, the Rationalist Teatro Gran Rex, was built in just seven months in association with the engineer Adolfo Moret. Its opening in 1937 caused a sensation in different areas. Victoria Ocampo praised him, thanking the purifying action that he would exert on the taste of the general public. It was, indeed, a fundamental milestone in the acceptance of modernity on a massive scale and a model of aesthetic renewal for commercial and entertainment architecture. The purist image of the exterior of the building is dramatically emphasized in the interior of the entrance hall by the bold structure of large lights and cantilevers.

Prebisch's career as an architect continued through the 1930s and 1940s including buildings designed for Victoria Ocampo. The one built on Calle Chile1368 (1935) is an excellent example of his ability to synthesize a purist aesthetic, a rational construction, and a functional layout. A certain North American-style versatility would allow him to incorporate exact exposed brick planes on the fronts of this work, constituting the first signs of expressiveness of materials in modern Argentine architecture. The Tucumán buildings 675 and 699 (1938) follow this trend, completely covering the strict fronts with exposed brick walls. In the store called "The Economic Emporium" (1941), he surprised with a work in the heart of the city that established its resounding expressiveness in a monumental curtain wall of wood and glass. He later built the Gran Rex Cinema in Rosario (1945) and the Victoria Theater in Salta (1945).

He was appointed Dean of the School of Architecture of the University of Buenos Aires in 1955 and, in 1962–63, served as interim Mayor of Buenos Aires. Returning to the School of Architecture as Dean in 1968, he was named Director of the National Fine Arts Academy in 1970, and died months later in that capacity at age 71.

== Images of Works ==
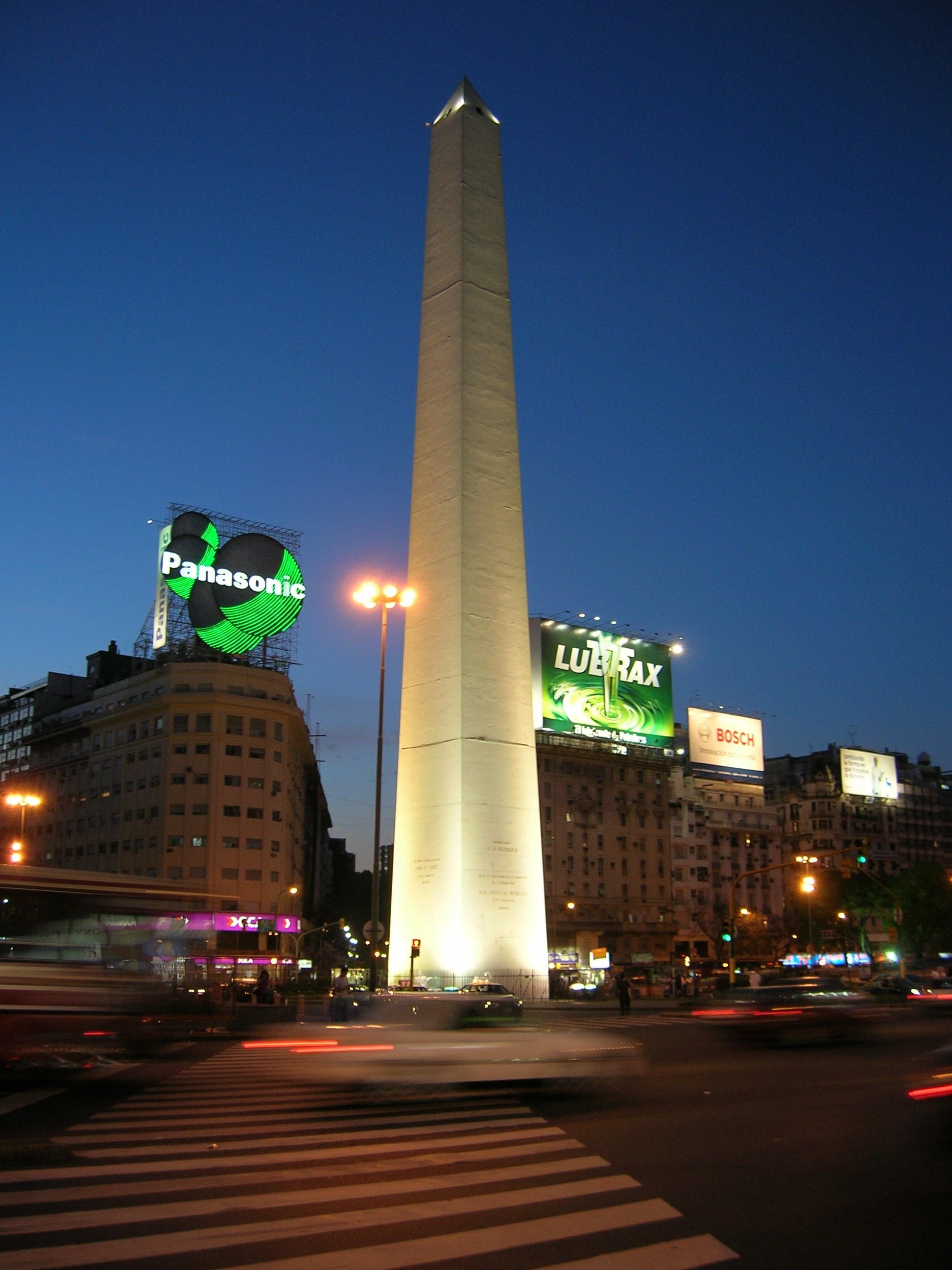
The Buenos Aires Obelisk (1937)

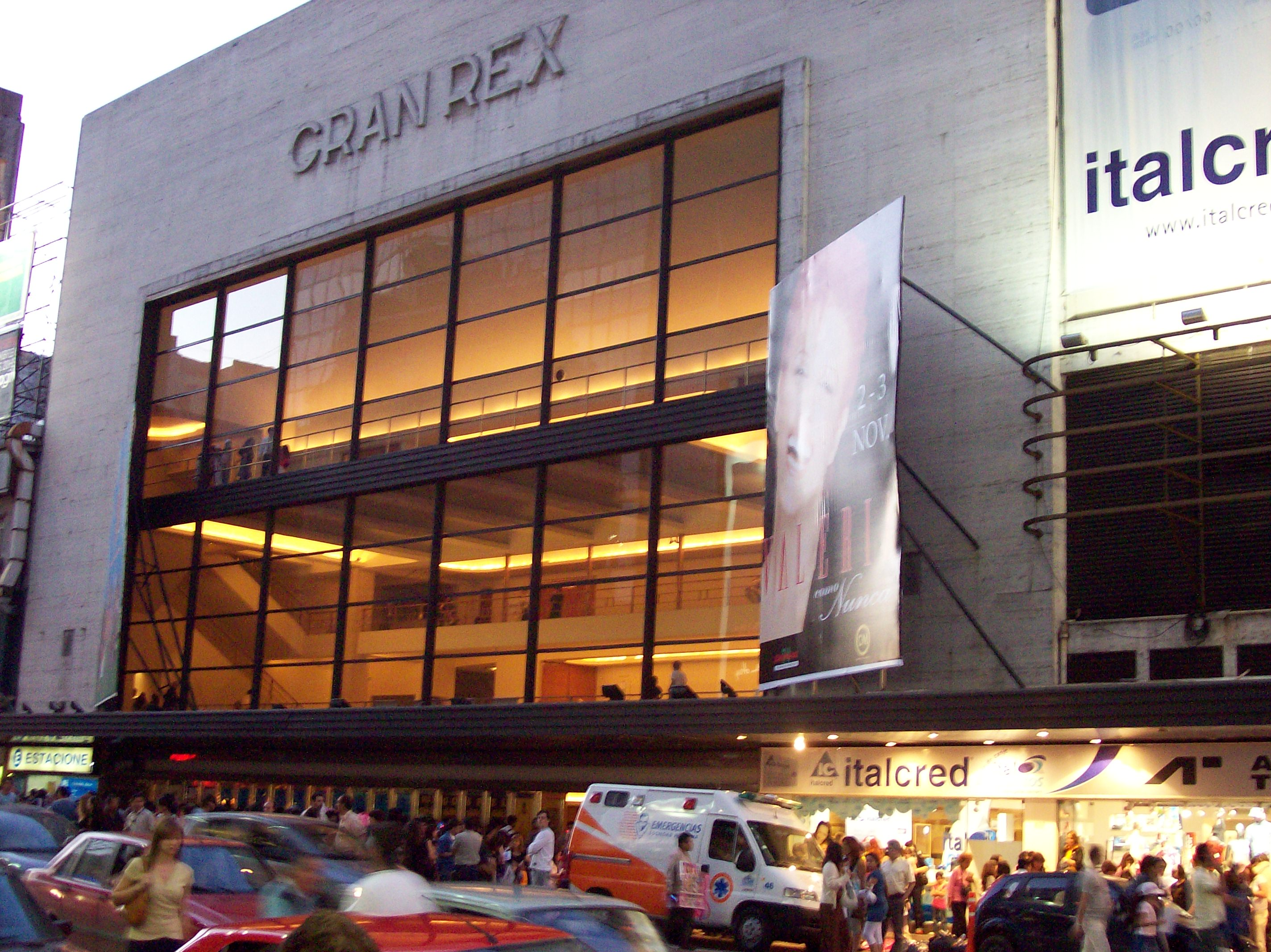
Gran Rex Theatre, Buenos Aires (1937)

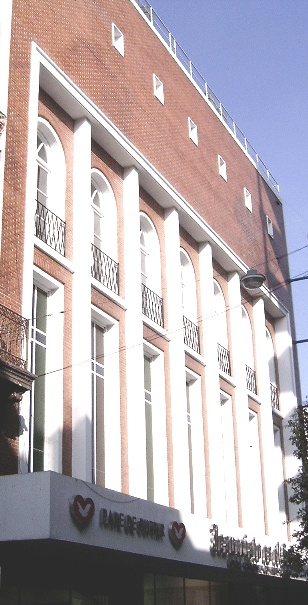
Gran Rex Cinema, Rosario (1945)

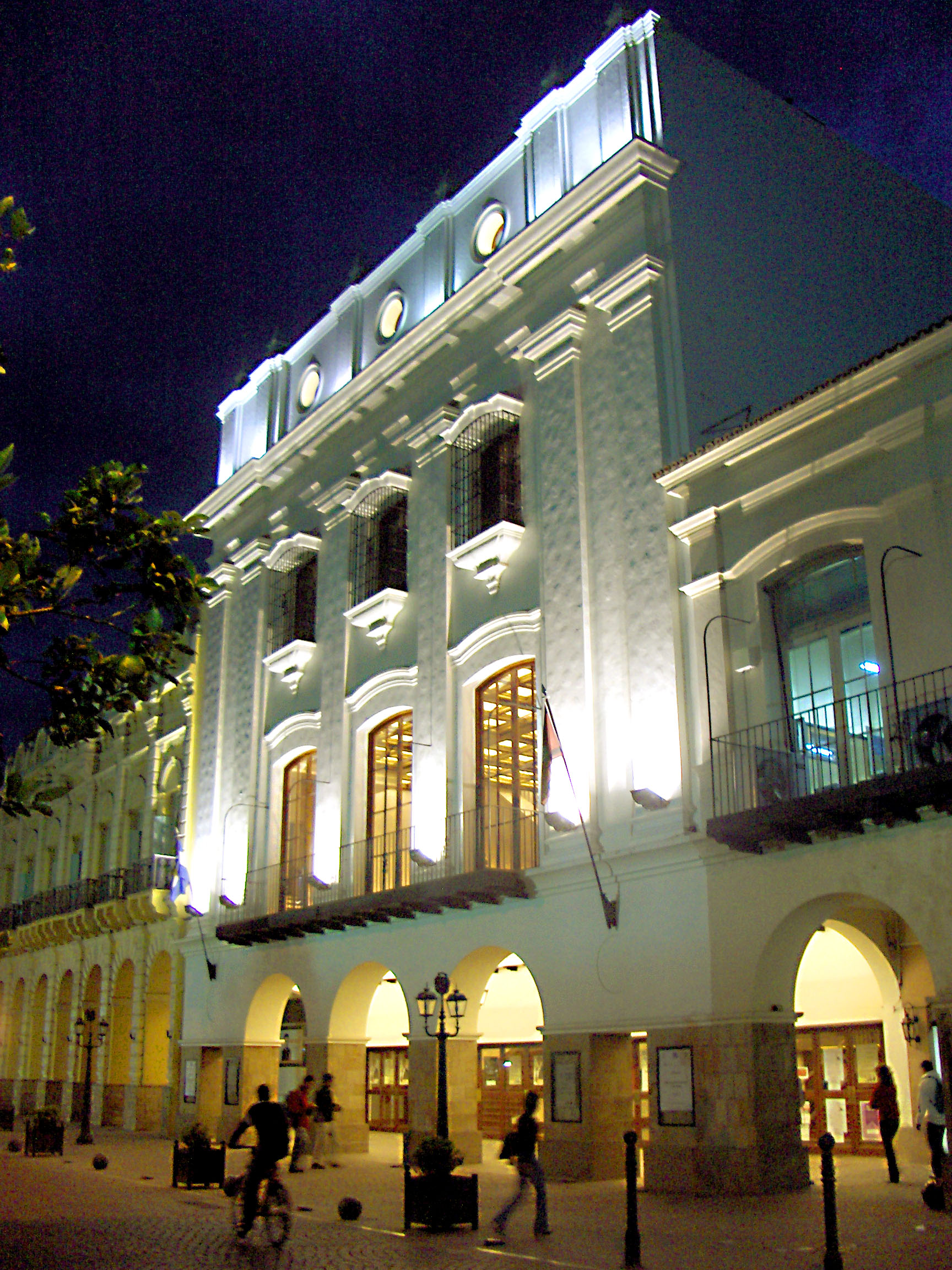
Victoria Theatre, Salta (1945)
