= List of people called Rabbi =

Rabbi (Heb., leader, teacher, master, director; variously rav, rebbe, etc.) is an honorific title used by his followers to refer to any rabbi. But some rabbis have achieved such fame that they are widely called rabbi even by people not their followers.

== People called Rabbi ==
- Yochanan ben Zakkai, sage of the first century CE and probably the first to be called "rabbi".
- Jesus of Nazareth was often called "Rabbi" in the Gospels of Matthew and Mark while in John he is also called "Rabboni" ("our rabbi").
- John the Baptist was called "Rabbi" by his disciples in John 3:26
- Judah HaNasi (c. 135 to 217)
- Mose Solomon (1900-1966), the "Rabbi of Swat", American Major League Baseball player

== People called Rabbah ==
- Rabbah bar Nahmani (c.270 – c.330)

== People called Rabenu ==
- Moses
- Judah HaNasi
- Gershom ben Judah
- Moses Maimonides

== People called Rav ==
- Abba Arika (175–247)

=== People called the Rav or haRav ===
- Obadiah ben Abraham (15th century)
- Shneur Zalman of Liadi (1745–1812)
- Joseph B. Soloveitchik (1903–1993)

=== People called Rava ===
- Abba ben Joseph bar Ḥama (c. 280–352)

== People called Mar (master, mister) ==
- Mar bar Rav Ashi (fl. 455, d. 467), son of Rabbi Ashi
- Mar Ukva

=== People called Maran (our master) ===
- Yosef Karo (1488–1575)

== See also ==
- List of rabbis
