= Capilla del Señor Historic Train =

Former heritage railway in Argentina

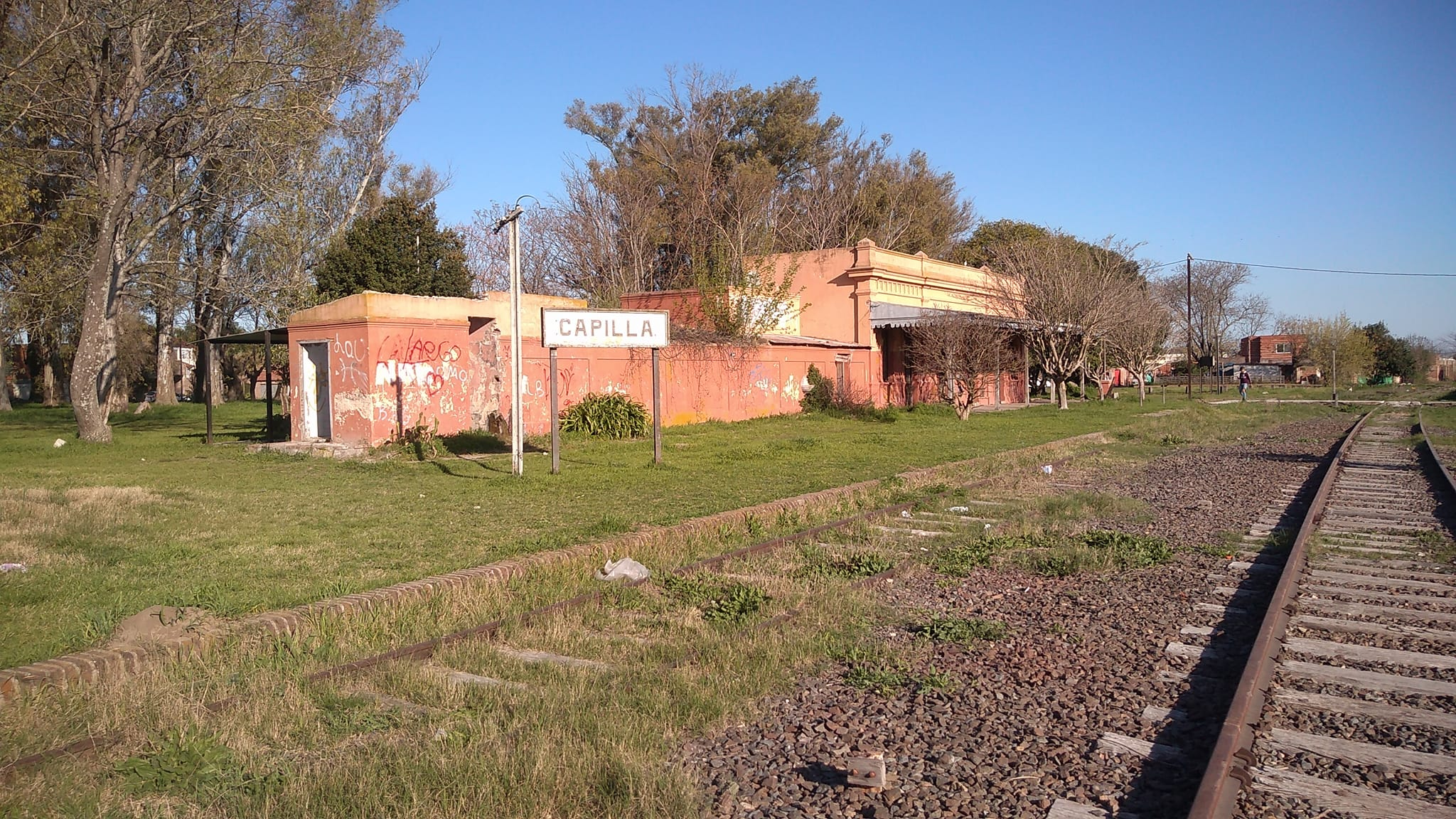
- Capilla station (FCU), pictured in 2021

Overview
- Service type: Inter-city
- Status: Defunct
- Locale: Buenos Aires Province
- First service: 1993
- Last service: 2011; 14 years ago
- Current operator: Ferroclub Argentino
- Former operator: Ferrocarriles Argentinos

Route
- Termini: F. Lacroze; Capilla del Señor
- Distance travelled: 86 km (53 mi)
- Service frequency: Weekly
- Line used: Urquiza

Technical
- Track gauge: 1,435 mm (4 ft 8 1/2 in)

The Capilla del Señor Historic Train was a heritage railway of Buenos Aires Province in Argentina. The service ran trains pulled by steam locomotives between the cities of Buenos Aires (departing from Federico Lacroze terminal in Chacarita) and Capilla del Señor, covering a distance of 86 km (53 mi). Trains ran on 1,435 mm (4 ft 8 1/2 in) tracks originally built by the Buenos Aires Central Railway and currently part of General Urquiza Railway since the railway nationalisation of 1948.

The service operated only on Sundays.

== History ==
The service was started by Ferroclub Argentino, a non-profit association formed by railway enthusiasts of Argentina that restored and put into operation old rolling stock.

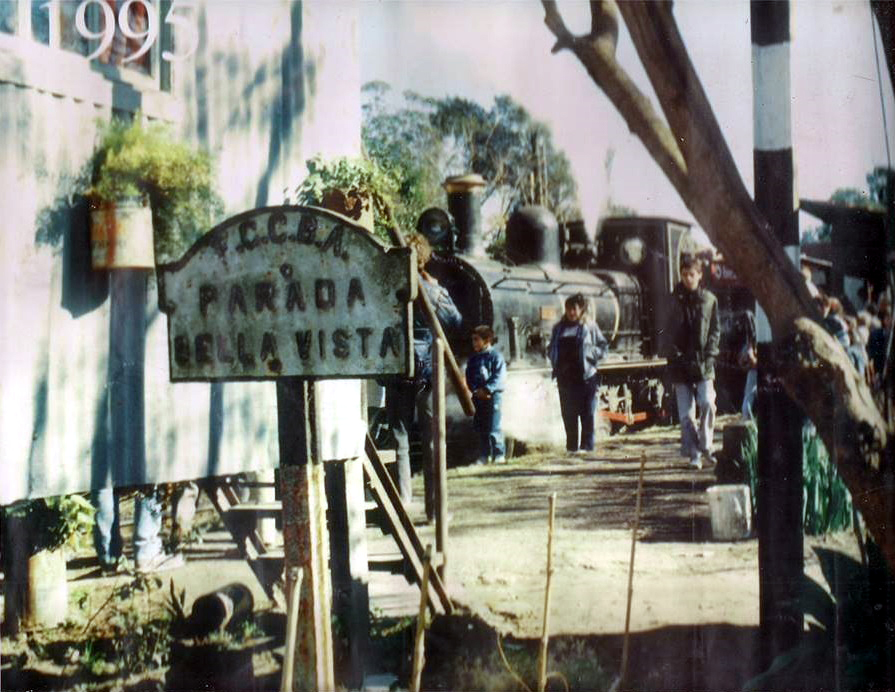
Train stop at Bella Vista station in 1995

Some of the locomotives owned and restored by Ferroclub were Baldwin, Henschel and Kerr Stuart, being the Neilson & Co. 0-6-0 n° 27 Monte Caseros (built in 1888) one of the models used to run trains to Capilla. Those locomotives had been originally acquired and run by Argentine North Eastern Railway ("Ferrocarril Nordeste Argentino") that connected the Argentine Mesopotamia from Concepción del Uruguay in Entre Ríos Province to Posadas in Misiones Province. The Yatay locomotive was also used to run trains on the line.

In 1999 the service was discontinued, although it would be reissued until it was definitely closed in 2011.

Since El Gran Capitán service was closed in 2011, only freight trains have run on those tracks. América Latina Logística operated until 2013 when the Government of Argentina revoked the contract of concession. Nowadays, state-owned Trenes Argentinos Cargas y Logística operates on Urquiza Railway routes.

== See also ==
- List of heritage railways
