= General Urquiza Railway =

Argentine railway division

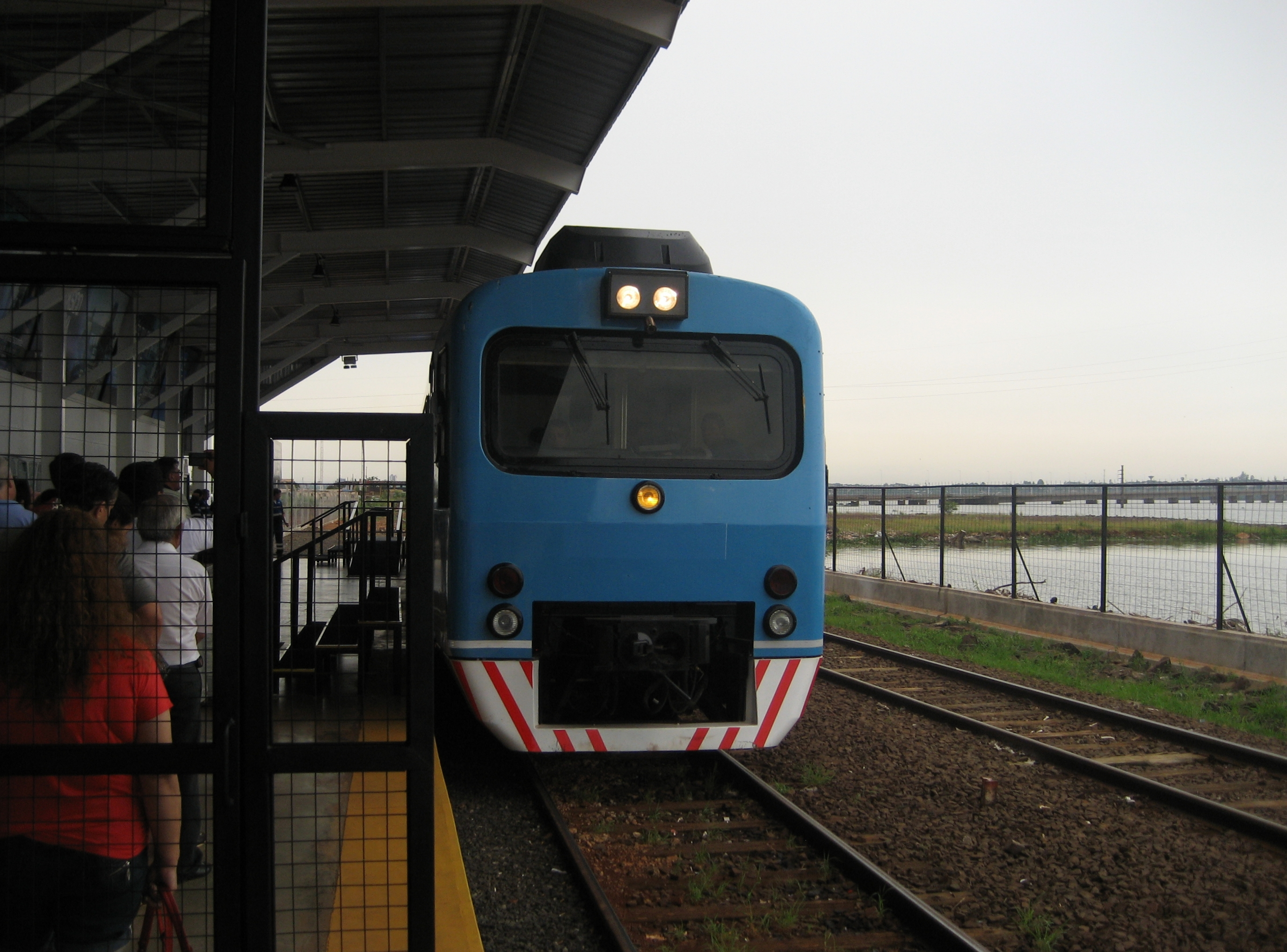
- Posadas-Encarnación International Train at Posadas

Overview
- Native name: Ferrocarril General Urquiza
- Status: Active
- Owner: Government of Argentina
- Locale: Buenos Aires; Entre Ríos; Corrientes; Misiones
- Termini: Federico Lacroze; Posadas

Service
- Type: Inter-city
- Operator(s): Trenes Argentinos

History
- Opened: 1948; 77 years ago

Technical
- Line length: 2,765 km (1,718 mi)
- Track gauge: 1,435 mm (4 ft 8 1/2 in) standard gauge
Route map
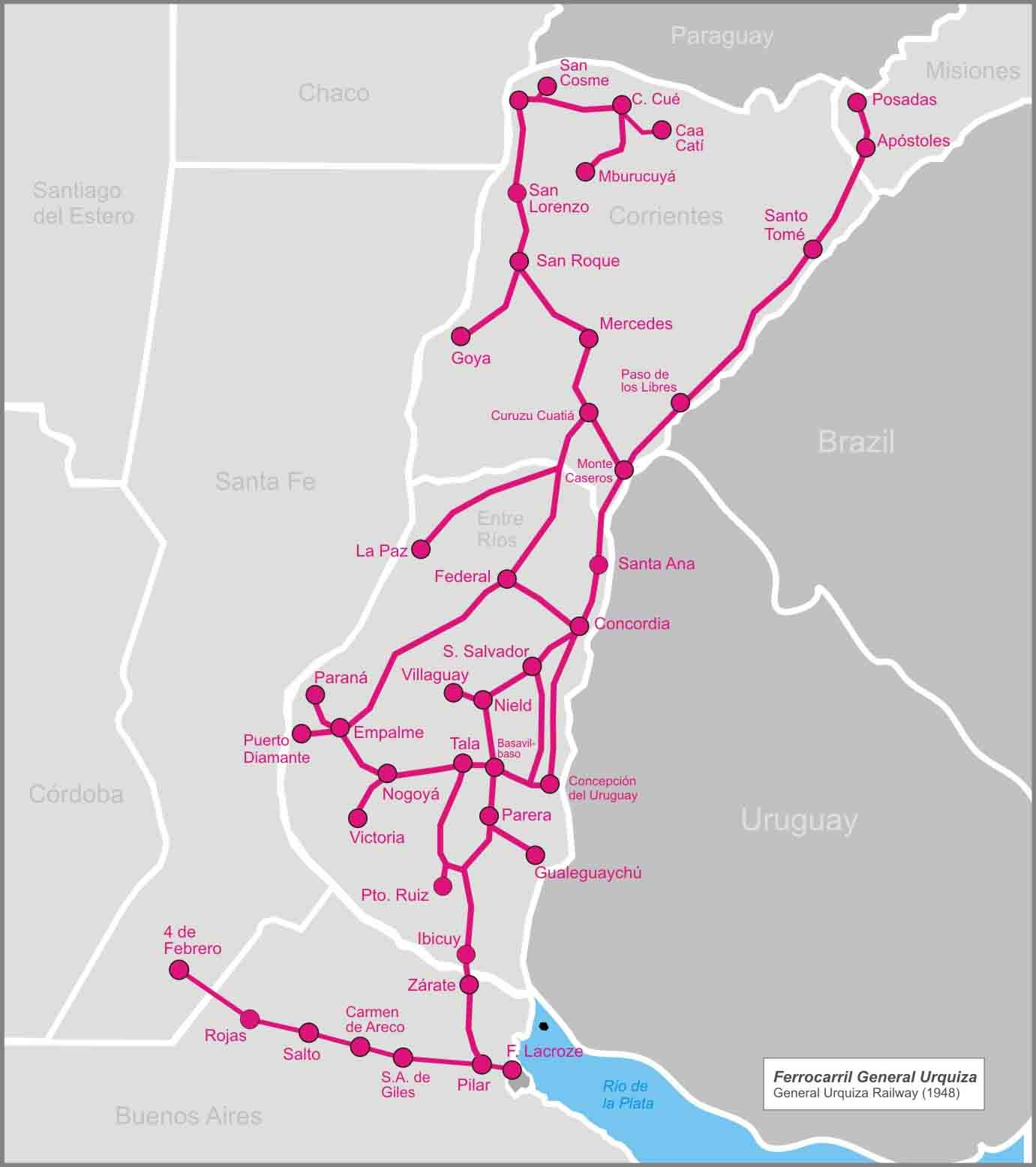

The General Urquiza Railway (FCGU) (in Spanish: Ferrocarril General Urquiza), named after the Argentine general and politician Justo José de Urquiza, is a standard gauge railway of Argentina which runs approximately northwards from Buenos Aires to Posadas, with several branches in between. It was also one of the six state-owned Argentine railway companies formed after President Juan Perón's nationalisation of the railway network in 1948. The six companies were managed by Ferrocarriles Argentinos which was later broken up during the process of railway privatisation beginning in 1991 during Carlos Menem's presidency.

The FCGU incorporated the British-owned 1,435 mm (4 ft 8 1/2 in) standard gauge Entre Ríos Railway and Argentine North Eastern Railway companies, as well as the standard gauge segments of the Argentine State Railway, and its principal lines departed from Federico Lacroze railway terminus in Buenos Aires to the north east through the provinces of Buenos Aires, Entre Ríos, Corrientes, and Misiones.

Today, the Urquiza Railway (Ferrocarril Urquiza) name is used to refer to the standard gauge railway network in Argentina and the services which run on it, rather than the state railway company.

== History ==
=== Background ===
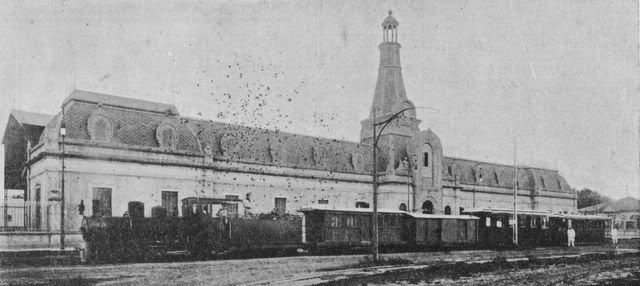
Corrientes station, terminus of Economic Railway.

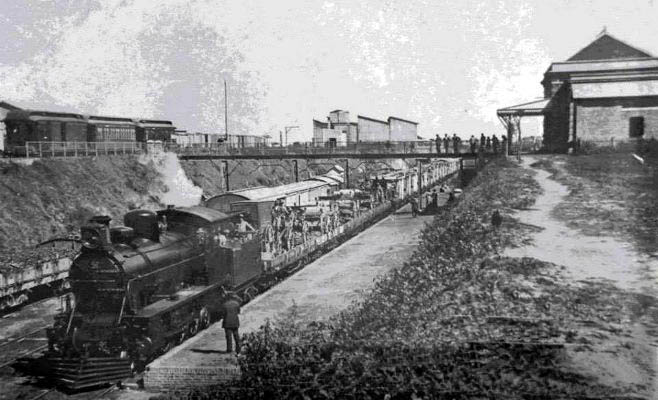
Train at Zárate station, 1914.

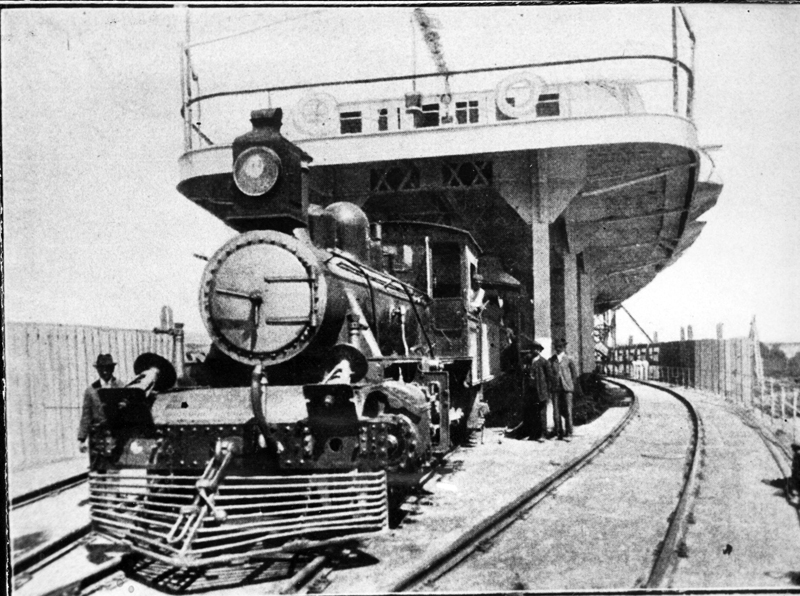
Steam locomotive unloading from a Paraná River train ferry (c.1920).

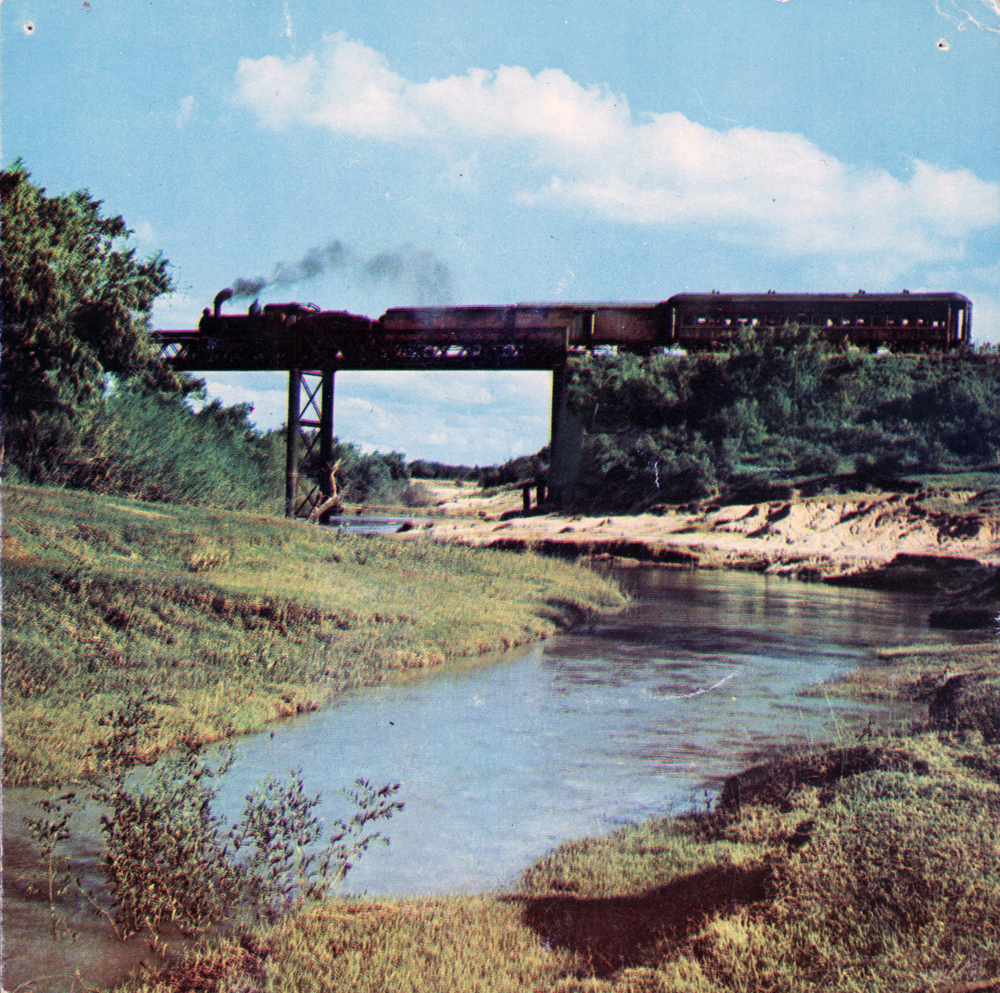
Steam locomotive crossing a bridge near Villaguay (c.1950).

The first segment of what is today the Urquiza railway was a 10 km segment between Gualeguay and Puerto Ruiz in Entre Ríos, which opened in 1866 as part of the Argentine Central Entre Ríos Railway company. In 1887 the line which runs from Paraná, Entre Ríos to Concepción del Uruguay was completed, with branches running to Villaguay, Gualeguaychú and Victoria. The Central Entre Ríos Railway was then taken over by the British Entre Ríos Railway in 1892.

In 1873 the British-owned East Argentine Railway opened a line between Concordia and Mercedes, extending these services northwards outside Entre Ríos to Corrientes for the first time. In November 1886, Congress approved the line's expansion to Misiones province, taking it from Monte Caseros in Corrientes to Posadas. In 1898 the company's owner John E. Clark transferred his concession to the Argentine North Eastern Railway, which opened the Monte Caseros - Posadas line in 1890.

At the same time, the Buenos Aires Central Railway company, headed by the Argentine businessman Federico Lacroze, opened a standard gauge railway line between Buenos Aires and Pilar in Buenos Aires Province in 1888, with an extension to Zárate that same year. In 1906 the line was extended to Entre Ríos and a traffic-sharing agreement signed between the Argentine and British rail companies, effectively joining the provinces of Corrientes and Misiones to Buenos Aires by rail for the first time. For some years the Paraná River was crossed using a train ferry, however bridges and viaducts were later built.

By 1913, train ferries crossing the northern part of the Paraná River between Posadas and Encarnación began operating, thus linking the Argentine railway to the Paraguayan railway and to the country's capital city of Asunción.

=== Nationalisation ===
In 1948, following the nationalisation of the railways in Argentina, all these standard gauge lines were grouped together under the Ferrocarril General Urquiza (General Urquiza Railway) name and would later become one of the six divisions of Ferrocarriles Argentinos.

The following standard gauge railway companies were added to Urquiza Railway network after the 1948 nationalisation:

Ferrocarril Urquiza
Former company	Origin	Provinces
Buenos Aires Central	Argentine	Buenos Aires, Santa Fe
Entre Ríos ^{(1)}	British	Entre Ríos
Argentine North Eastern ^{(2)}	British	Entre Ríos, Corrientes, Misiones
Corrientes Economic	Argentine	Corrientes Province

Notes:

- ^{(1)} The Entre Ríos Railway had acquired the Central Entre Ríos Railway in 1892.
- ^{(2)} The Argentine North Eastern had acquired the East Argentine in 1907.

In 1991 the railway was privatised as part of Carlos Menem's neoliberal reforms, though the railway, along with all the railways of Argentina, are in the process of being re-nationalised as of 2015.

== Suburban branch ==
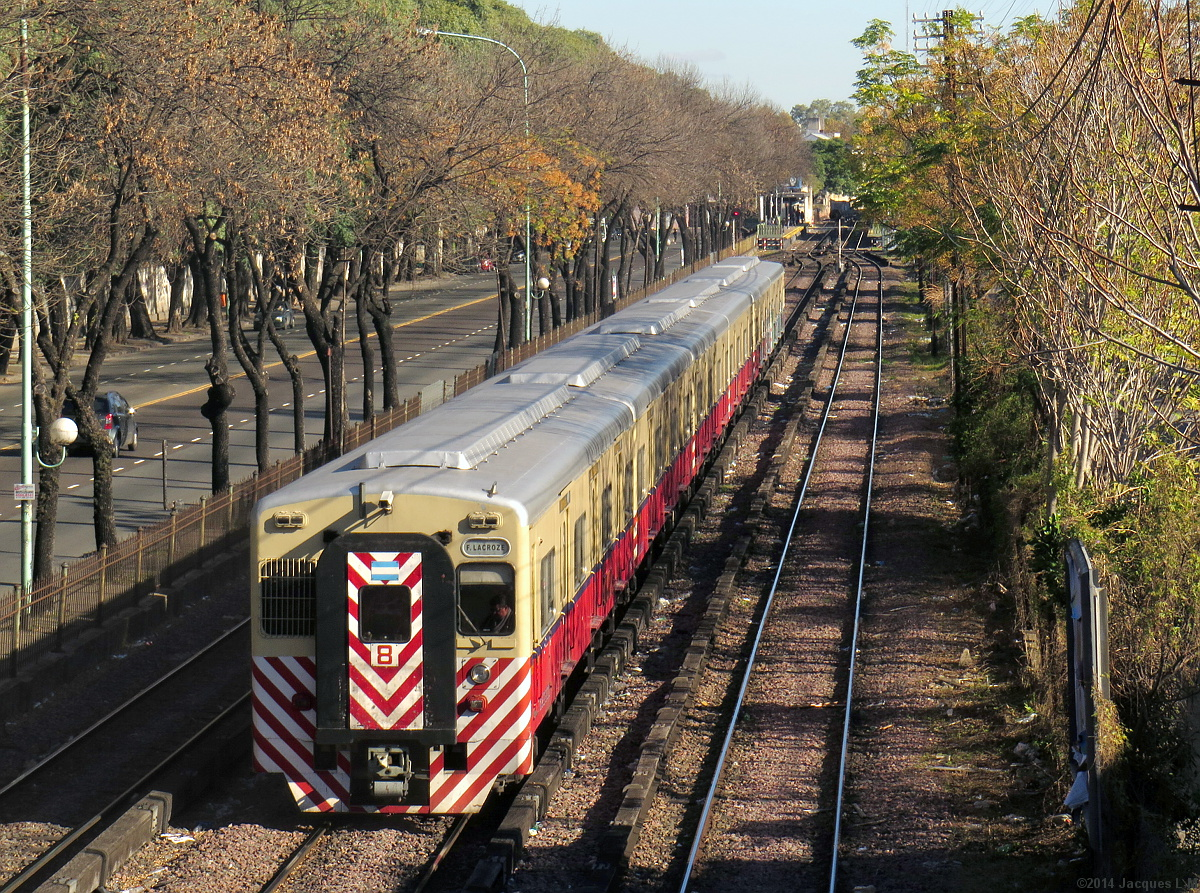
Urquiza Line rolling stock.

In the metropolitan sector of the City of Buenos Aires there is an electrified commuter branch that operates from the Federico Lacroze terminus in the Buenos Aires neighbourhood of Chacarita, to the General Lemos station in suburban San Miguel. The branch is the only electrified part of the railway and the only part which is operated for passengers by a private company, Metrovías. It connects with Line B of the Buenos Aires Underground at Federico Lacroze station.

The line was originally designed to be part of Underground Line B with a ramp taking it underground at its current terminus, though this was never implemented. It is still possible that the existing ramp would allow connection to line B, enabling trains to run through to the centre of Buenos Aires, though this has still yet to be done to this date.

== Gran Capitán ==
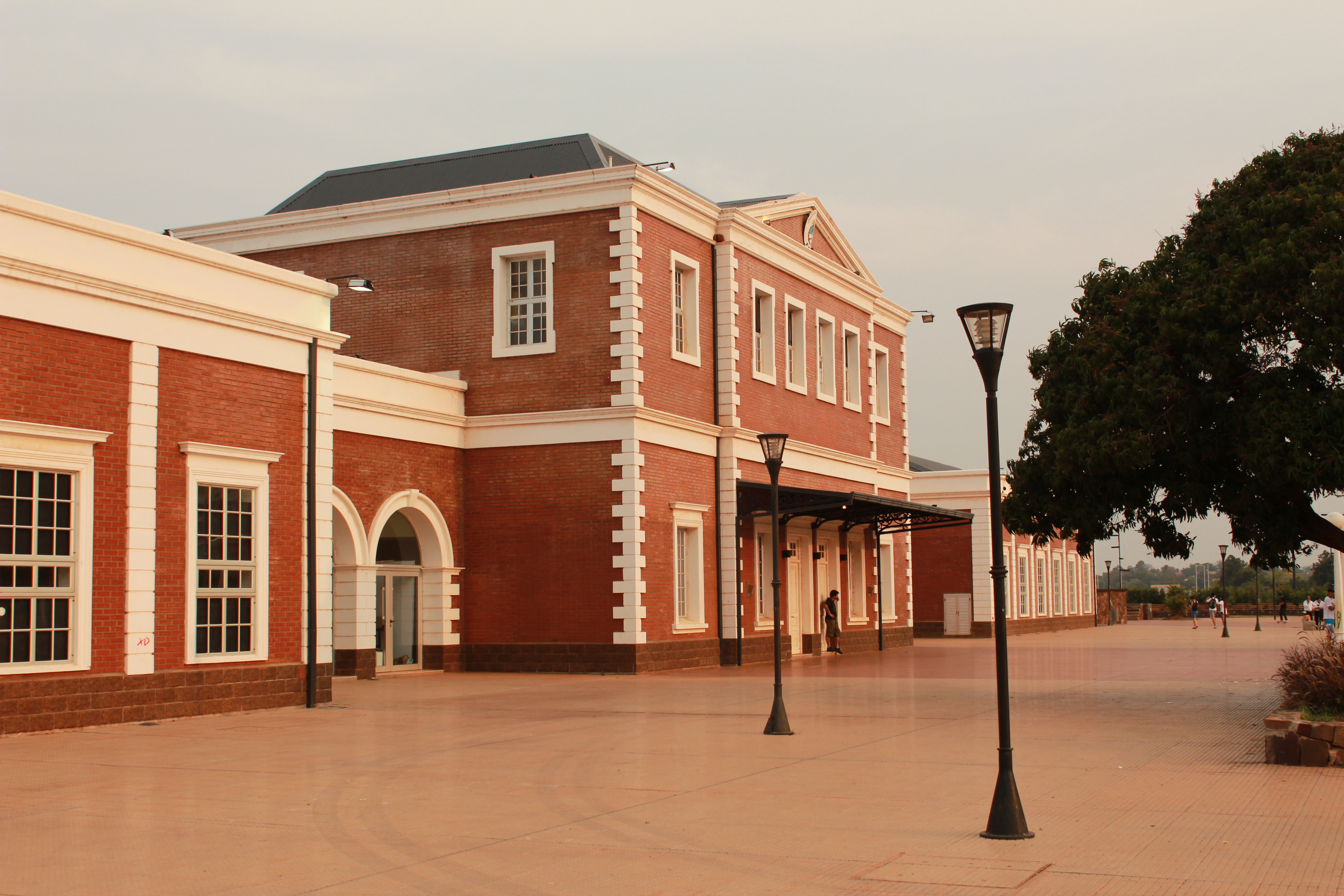
Posadas Station exterior.

El Gran Capitán (english: The Great Captain) was a service that ran from Buenos Aires to Posadas under Ferrocarriles Argentinos (FA) and later under Trenes Especiales Argentinos (TEA). With the dissolution of Ferrocarriles Argentinos, the interurban and long-distance services ceased to run in 1993, but in 2003, TEA revived the passenger rail service from Buenos Aires to Posadas, capital of the Province of Misiones. This service ceased to operate in November 2011, though it was briefly re-activated in 2012 under the company Trenes de Buenos Aires until the national government revoked all their concessions later that year following the Buenos Aires rail disaster.

Since then, there have been numerous calls for the return of the service given the large-scale reactivation of many of the country's railways since 2014.

== Local Entre Ríos services ==
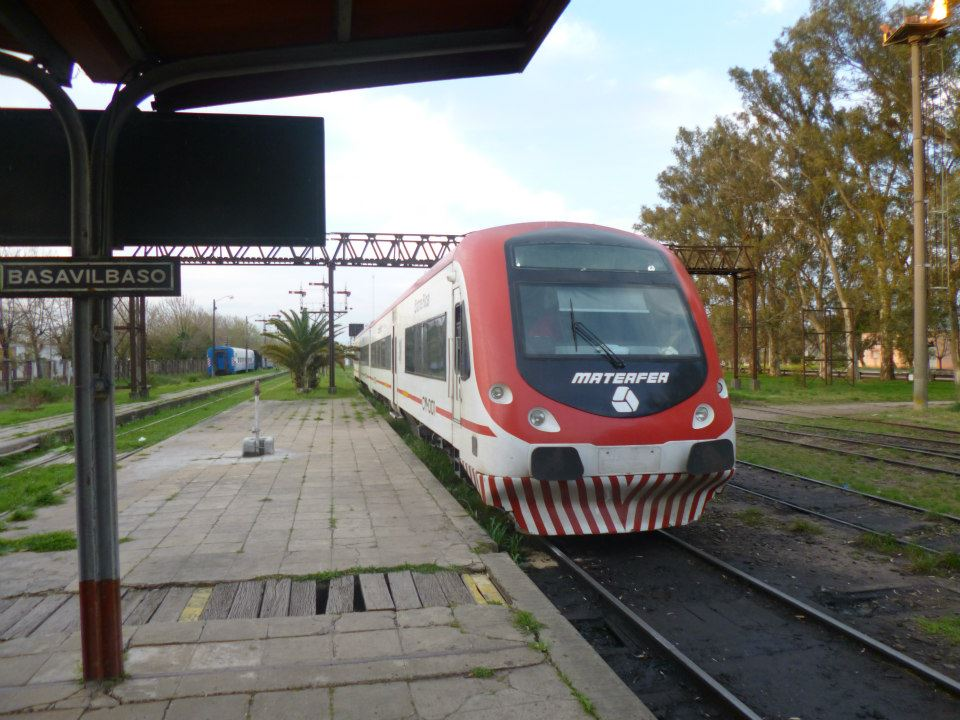
A Materfer CMM 400-2 used on the line.

Some interurban services in the Province of Entre Ríos also exist, such as the service from Paraná, Entre Ríos to Concepción del Uruguay and the service from Basavilbaso to Concordia, both of which were originally part of the Central Entre Ríos Railway. These use Materfer rolling stock and are operated by the state-owned company Trenes Argentinos. Currently many of these lines are being renovated with the intention of improving services.

The city of Paraná also uses part of the Urquiza railway for its own commuter rail network. Trains run six times a day on weekdays from Paraná to Colonia Avellaneda with 8 stations in between, while another service runs from Paraná to Villa Fontana twice a day on weekdays with four stops. Both services have heavily subsidised prices for local residents.

== International rail links ==
This Posadas-Encarnación service links the cities of Posadas in the Argentine province of Misiones to the city of Encarnación in Paraguay. It was opened in 2014 and is operated by Casimiro Zbikoski S.A. under the authority of the state-owned Trenes Argentinos using Dutch Wadloper rolling stock. It currently carries 8,000 passengers daily and expansions are being considered as the service is already reaching its maximum capacity.

The Tren de los Pueblos Libres (Train of the Free Peoples) was a short lived rural train service between Pilar in Argentina and Paso de los Toros in Uruguay. The service was closed in May 2012 after the Government of Argentina revoked all concessions to Trenes de Buenos Aires (the operator of the service) after the Once rail disaster, which occurred on a service operated by that company.

== Gallery ==
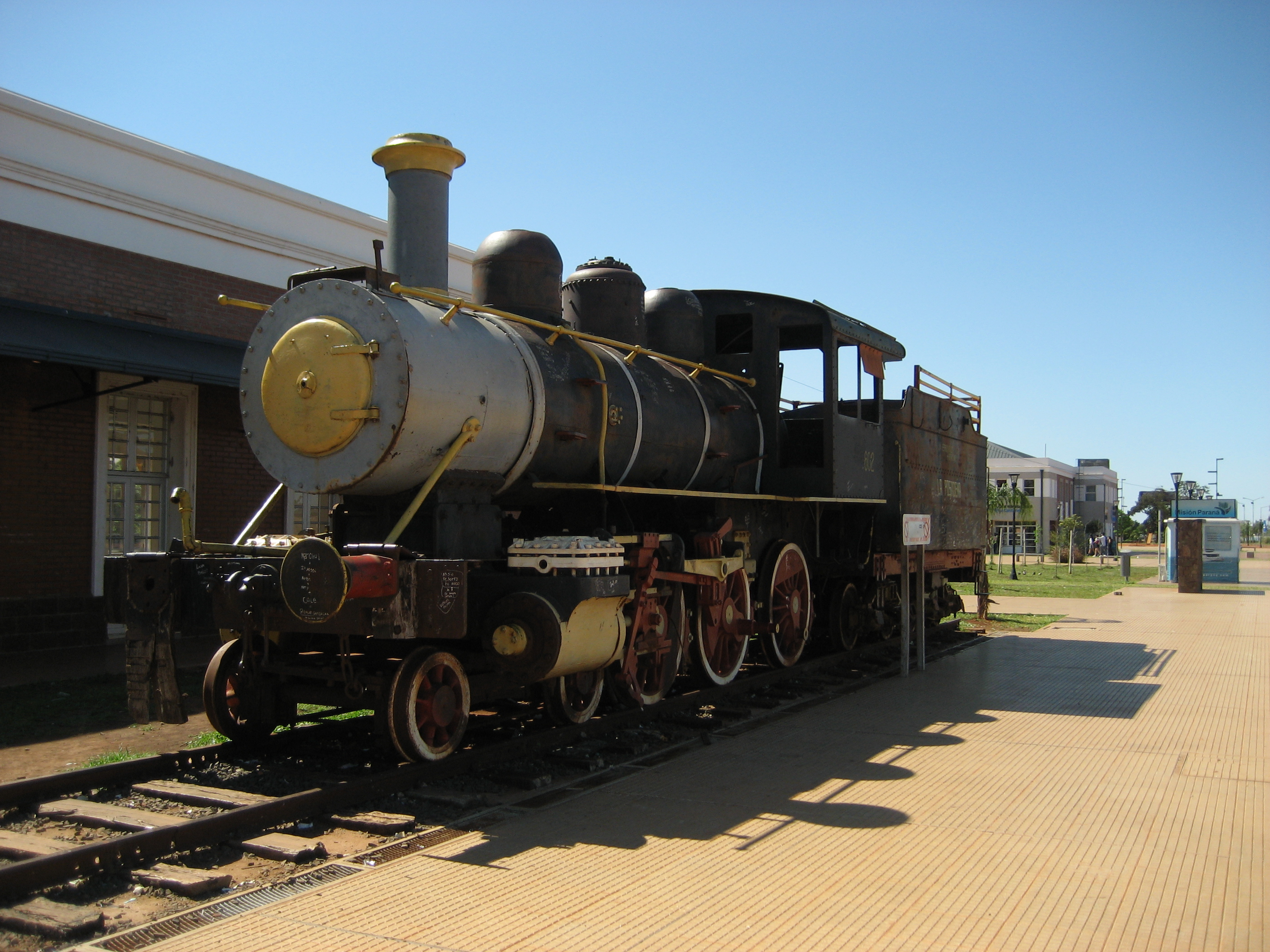
La Posadeña locomotive exhibited in Posadas

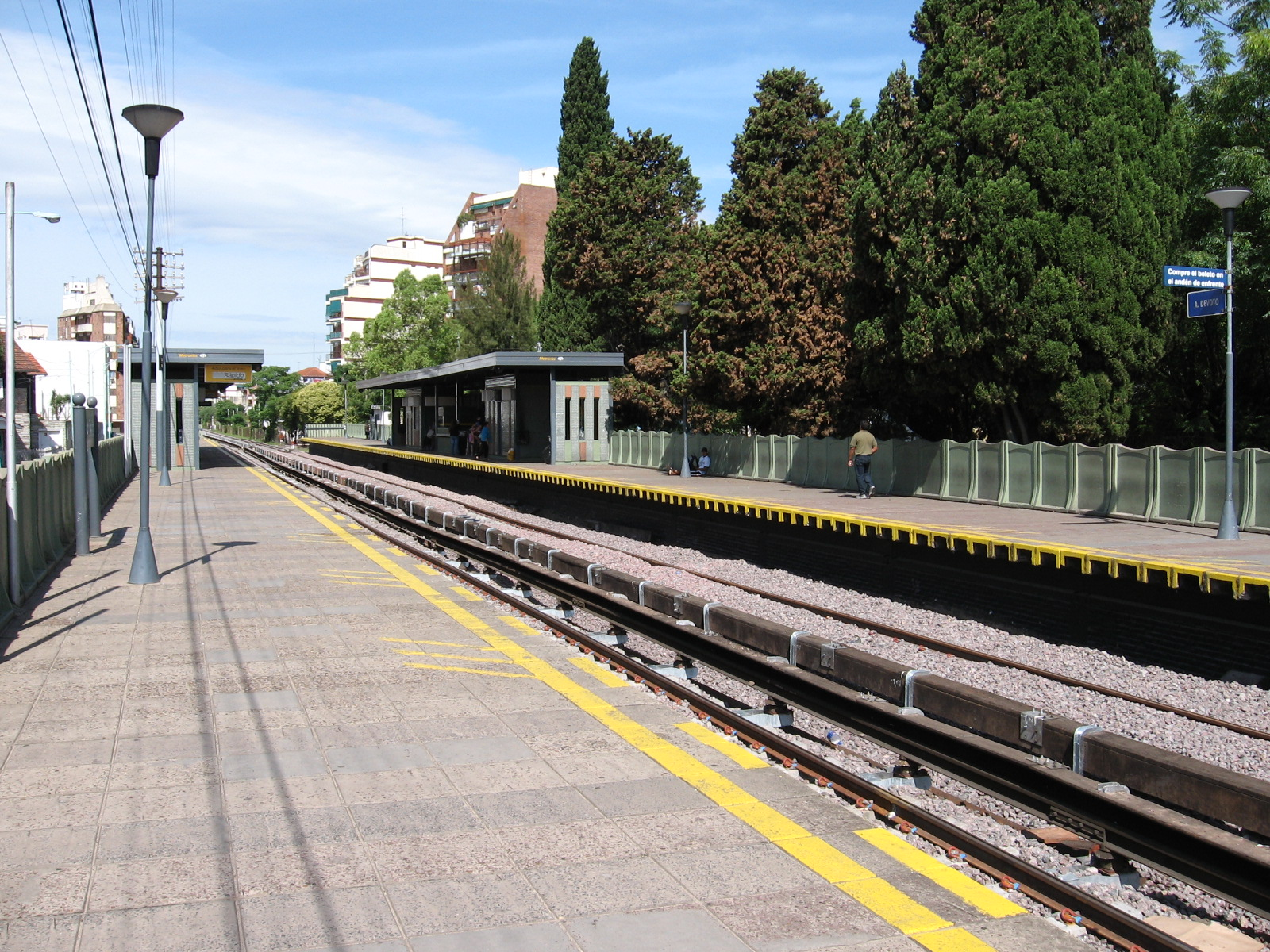
Buenos Aires suburban branch station

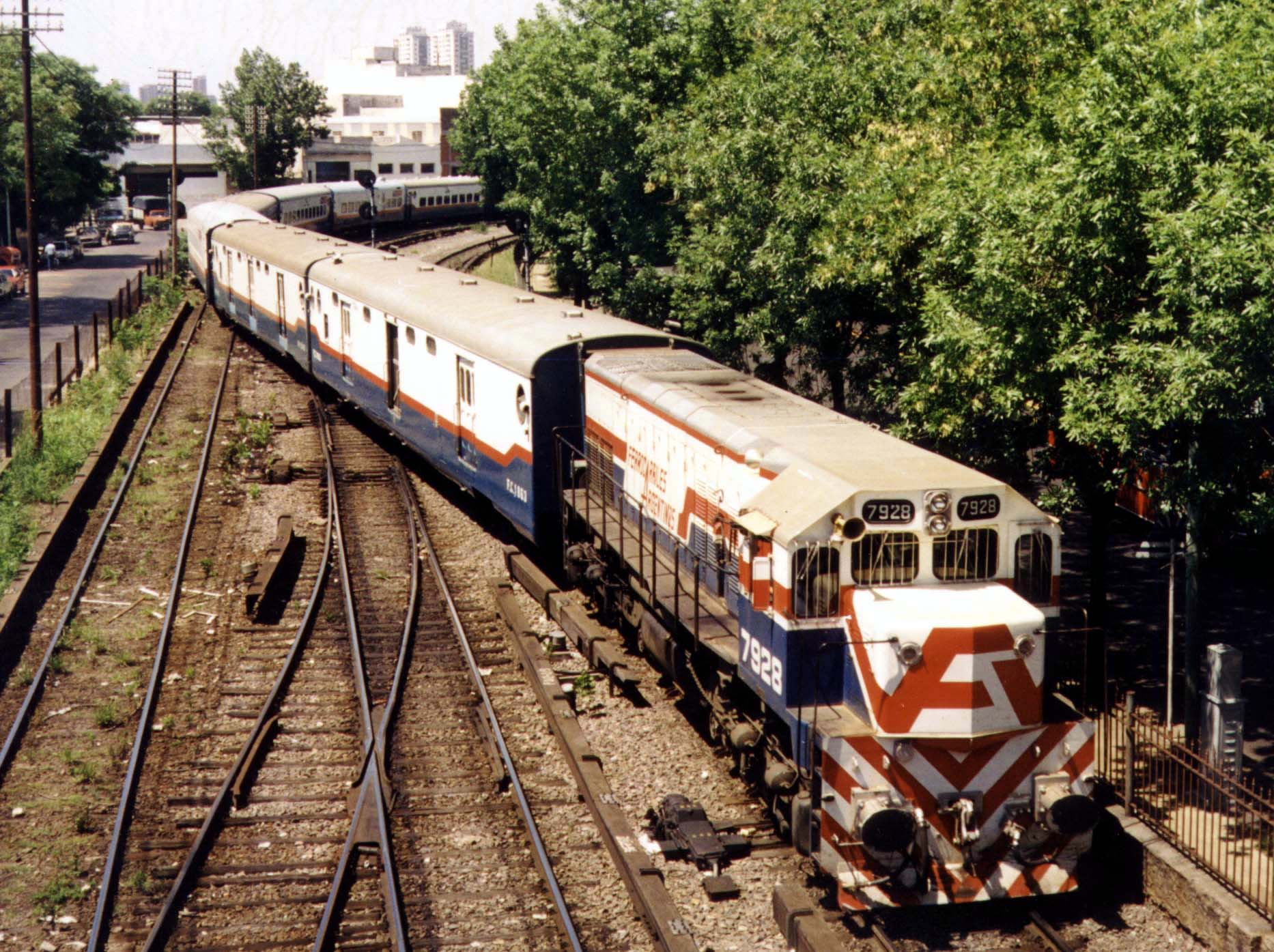
Gran Capitán in Ferrocarriles Argentinos livery (1990)

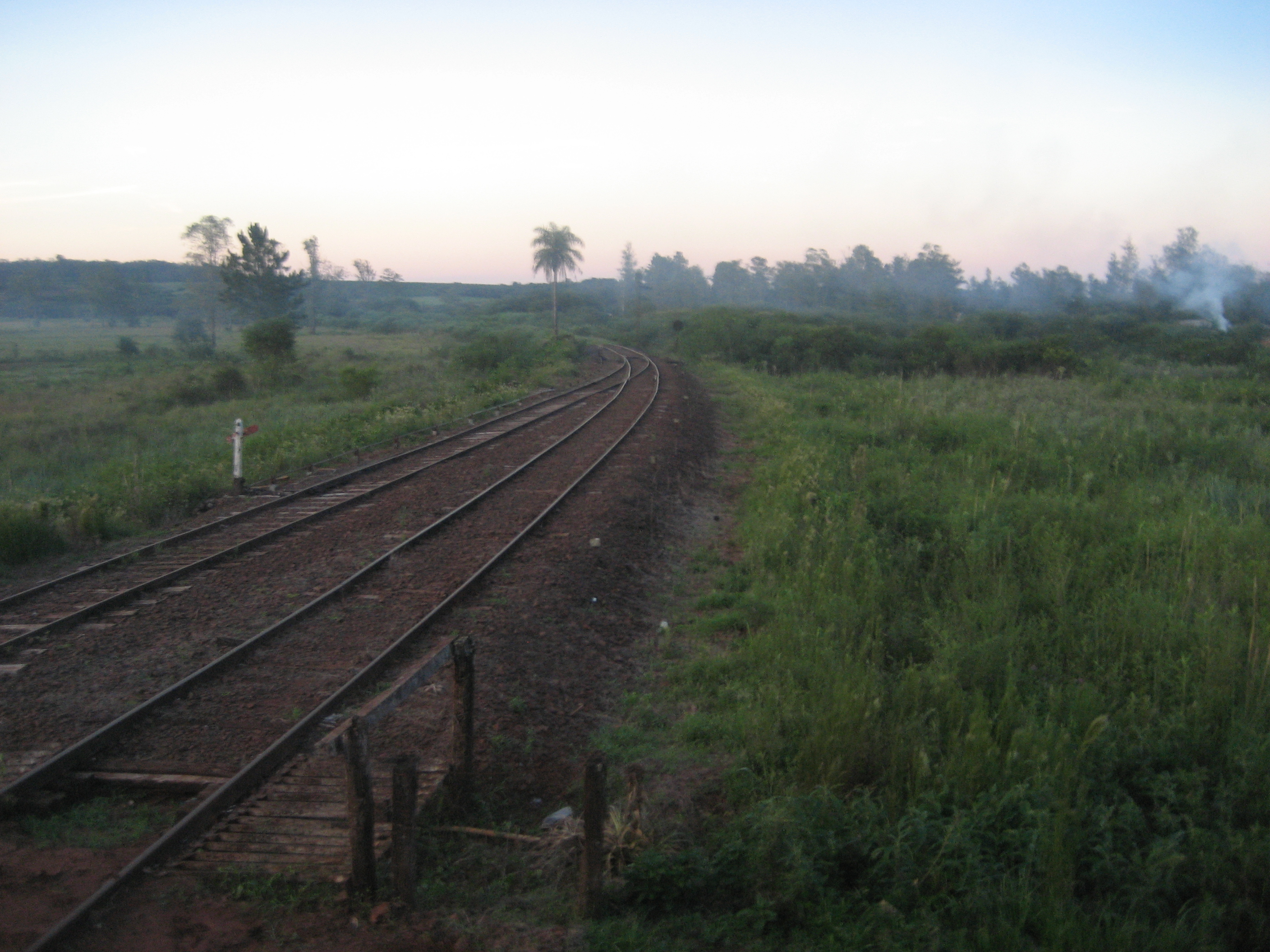
Railway near Apóstoles, Misiones

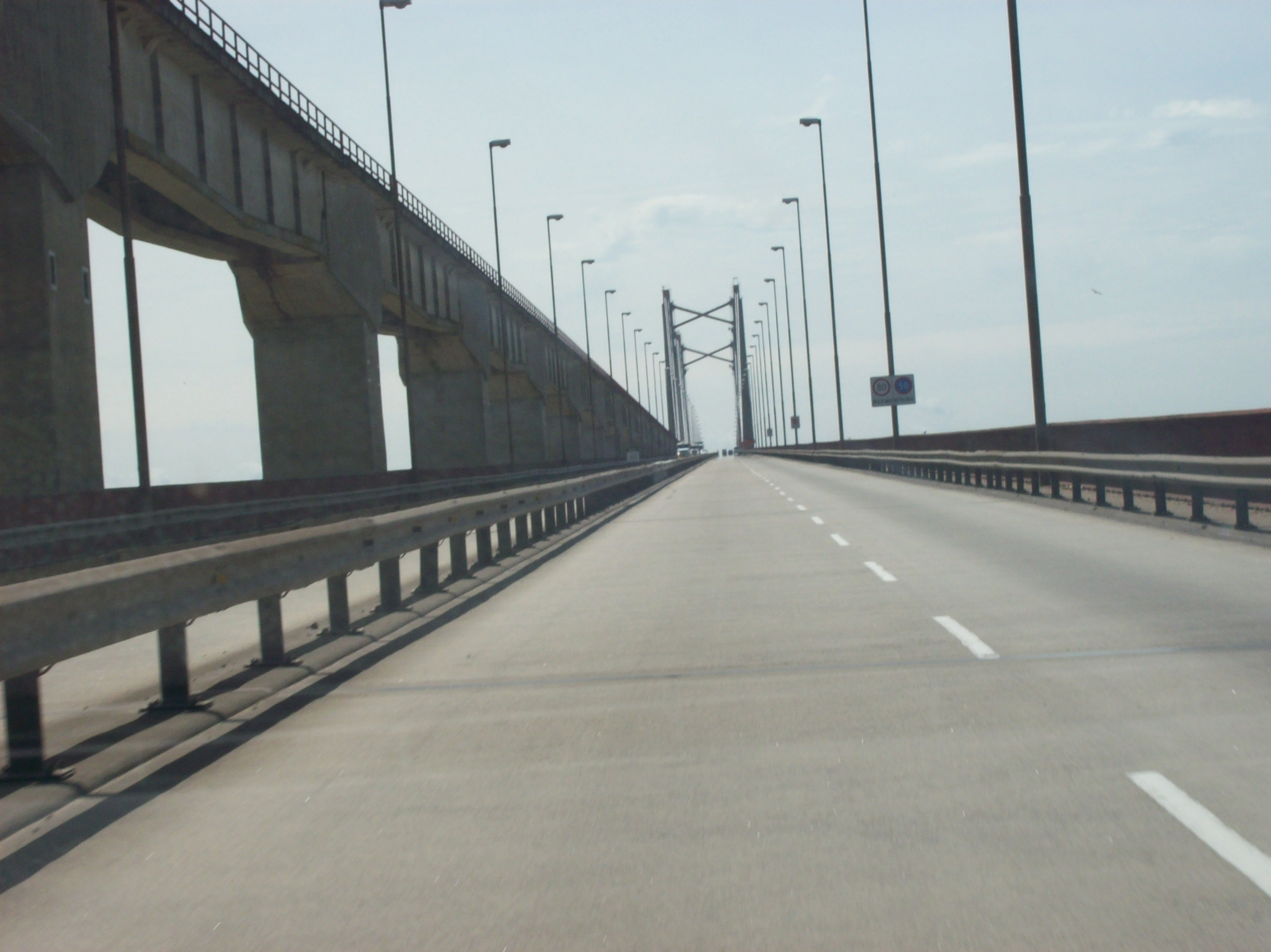
The viaduct (left) is now used to cross the Paraná River to Entre Ríos

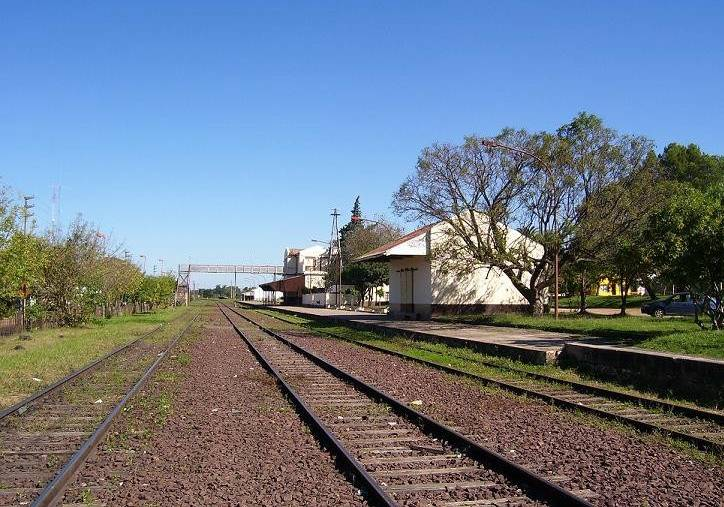
The condition of the rails has deteriorated since privatisation

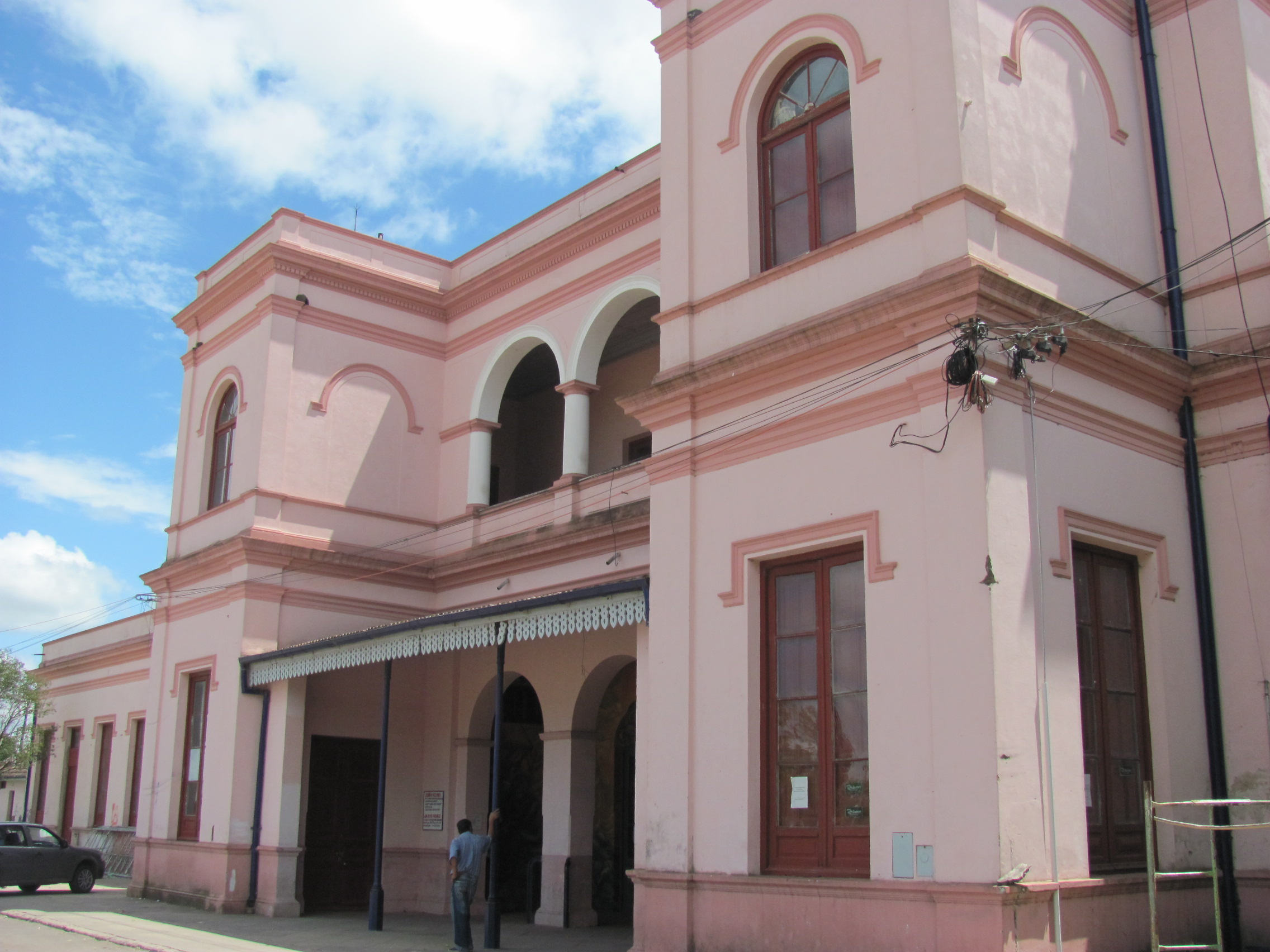
Concepción del Uruguay station

== See also ==
- Rail transport in Argentina
- San Roque González de Santa Cruz Bridge

== Bibliography ==
- Humm, Robert (April–May 2015). "Electric traction on the Urquiza Railway, Argentina". Locomotives International (95): 14–19. ISSN 1353-7091.
