= Federico Lacroze railway station =

Railway station in Buenos Aires, Argentina

Coordinates: 34°35′12″S 58°27′20″W

Federico Lacroze
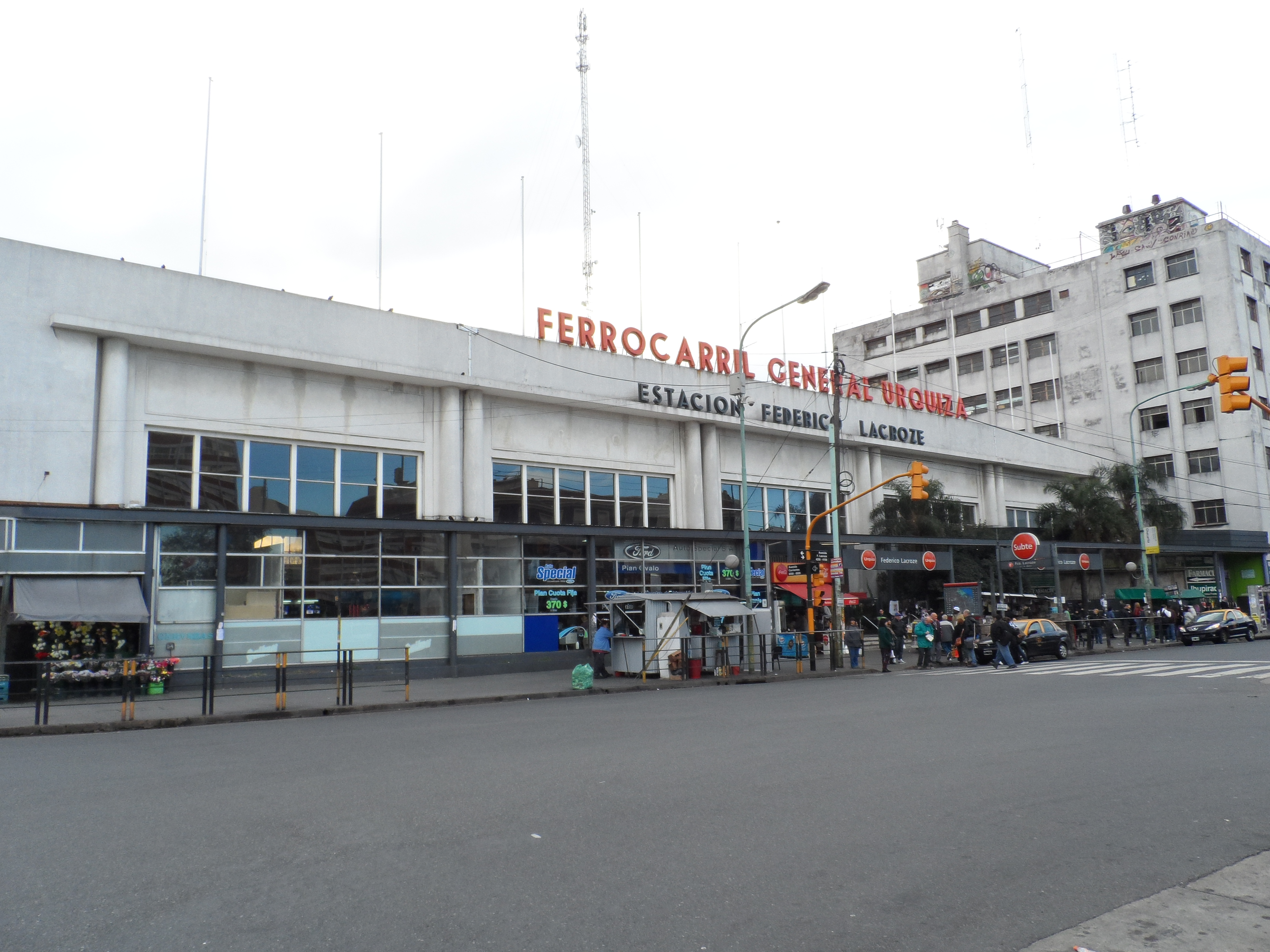
- Railway station exterior

General information
- Location: Federico Lacroze and Corrientes Ave., Buenos Aires, Argentina
- System: Commuter rail
- Owner: Government of Argentina
- Operator: Metrovías (1994–present)
- Lines: General Urquiza Railway; Urquiza Line
- Connections: Underground

Construction
- Platform levels: 10

Other information
- Fare zone: Buenos Aires

History
- Opened: 1888 as "Chacarita" station (Buenos Aires Central Railway terminus)
- Rebuilt: 1957; 69 years ago
- Electrified: Third Rail

National Historic Monument of Argentina
Location

Federico Lacroze railway station (Spanish: Estación Federico Lacroze) is a passenger railway station in Buenos Aires, Argentina. The station is located in the city's outlying barrio (neighbourhood) of Chacarita in a predominantly residential area. It is just a short distance north of the Cementerio de la Chacarita, the city's largest cemetery. The station is named after Federico Lacroze, a prominent 19th century Argentine railway and transport pioneer who obtained the concession for building the Buenos Aires Central Railway in 1884. When the Argentine railway network was nationalised in 1948 the station became the Buenos Aires terminus for the lines that became part of the General Urquiza Railway (FCGU).

Federico Lacroze station is accessible from the B line of the Buenos Aires Underground system from the station there and by numerous local public bus services. In 2014, the station underwent restoration works in its main hall and platforms.

== History ==
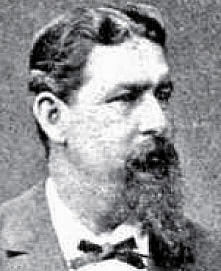
Railway entrepreneur Federico Lacroze

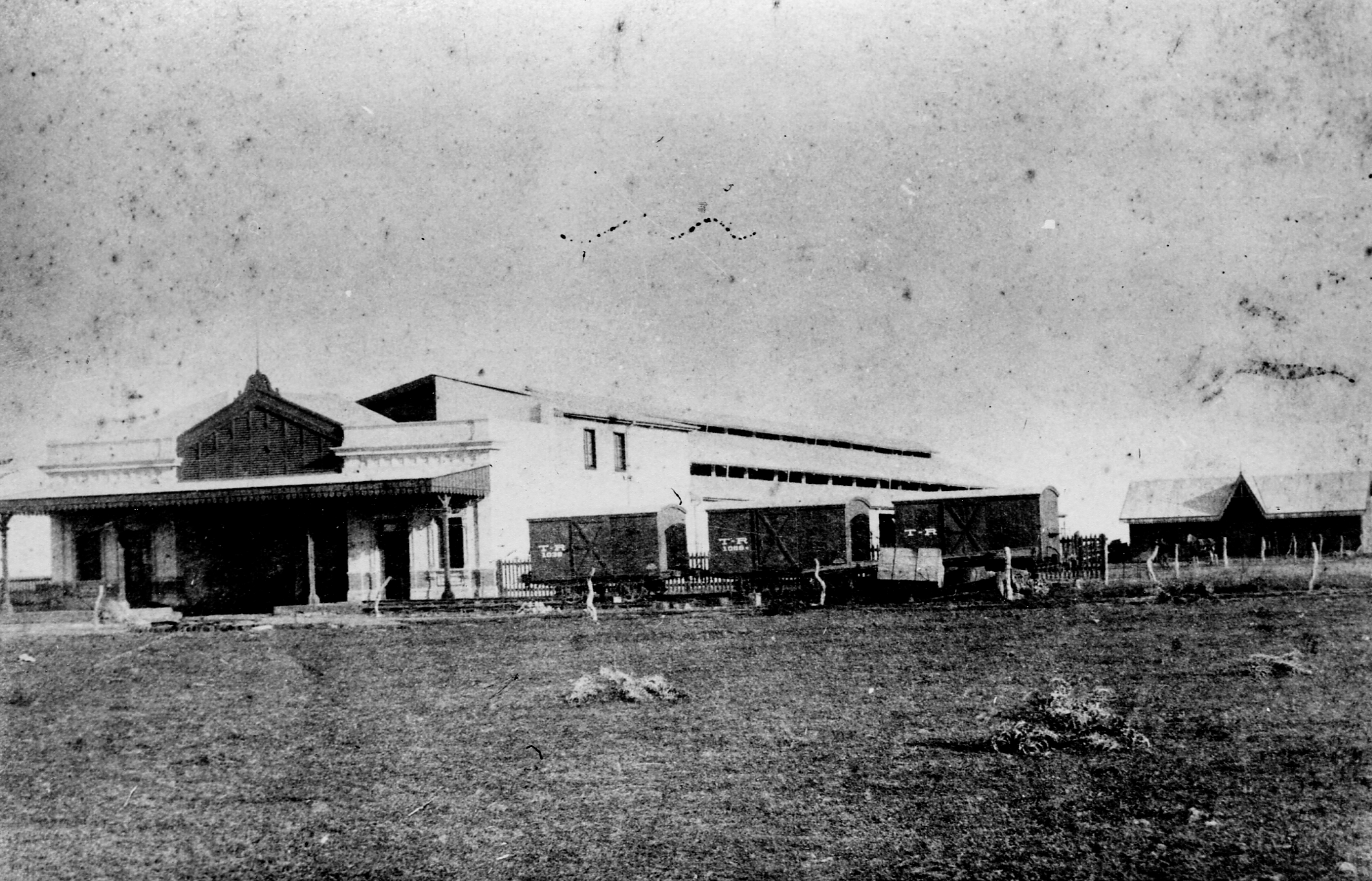
Former Chacarita station, terminus of Tramway Rural, c. 1880s. The building would be replaced by the current terminal

The first station to open was "Chacarita" terminus, a precarious building that served as terminal for the Buenos Aires Central Railway, originally a horse-drawn railway established by entrepreneur Federico Lacroze that built and operated a line to cities of Zárate in Buenos Aires and 4 de Febrero in Santa Fe. The station would be later demolished.

The current underground station had been designed by the Lacroze Brothers with the intention of being a connection with the Buenos Aires Central Railway. The tunnels and parts of the original station are used for Line B to this day.

The current terminal was designed by Argentine architect Santiago Mayaud-Maisonneuve and his son Carlos in 1951, following the Rationalist style of architecture. It was inaugurated in 1957 and its construction financed by the state, as the railways were state-owned at the time. The building received protected status in 2009.

== Services ==
The station functions primarily as a commuter rail station but also handles some long-distance services. The local transit company Metrovías, which also manages the Buenos Aires Underground system, operates regular electric commuter train services every 10–20 minutes into the nearby Buenos Aires suburbs along its Urquiza Line. Stations on this line include Villa Devoto, Martín Coronado (which also serves Ciudad Jardín), Hurlingham and San Miguel amongst others.

In the past, the station also served as the terminal for the long-distance service to Misiones Province, however this service has been suspended as of 2012. Following railway privatisation in Argentina, the private railway company Trenes Especiales Argentinos (TEA) operated long-distance passenger services to the city of Posadas in the very north of Argentina on the border with Paraguay. The service used the standard gauge network of the General Urquiza Railway which runs through the provinces of Buenos Aires, Entre Ríos, Corrientes and Misiones. This train stopped at many places on the way including Zárate in Buenos Aires Province, Basavilbaso and Villaguay in Entre Ríos Province, Monte Caseros and Santo Tomé in Corrientes Province. In 2012 the service was briefly taken over by Trenes de Buenos Aires, however their concession was revoked by the National Government on the same year and remains without an operator to this day.

There have been numerous calls for the return of the service given the large-scale reactivation of many of the country's railways since 2014, however as of 2015, the service remains suspended.

In May 2021, the station was declared National Historic Monument, along with other terminal stations such as Constitución, Once, and Federico Lacroze.

== Historic operators ==
Operator	Period
(Argentina) Buenos Aires Central Railway	1888–1948
(Argentina) Ferrocarriles Argentinos	1948–1991
(Argentina) FEMESA (Note: Temporary operator prior to the privatization of commuter rail services.)	1991–1994
(Argentina) Metrovías	1994–present

== Gallery ==
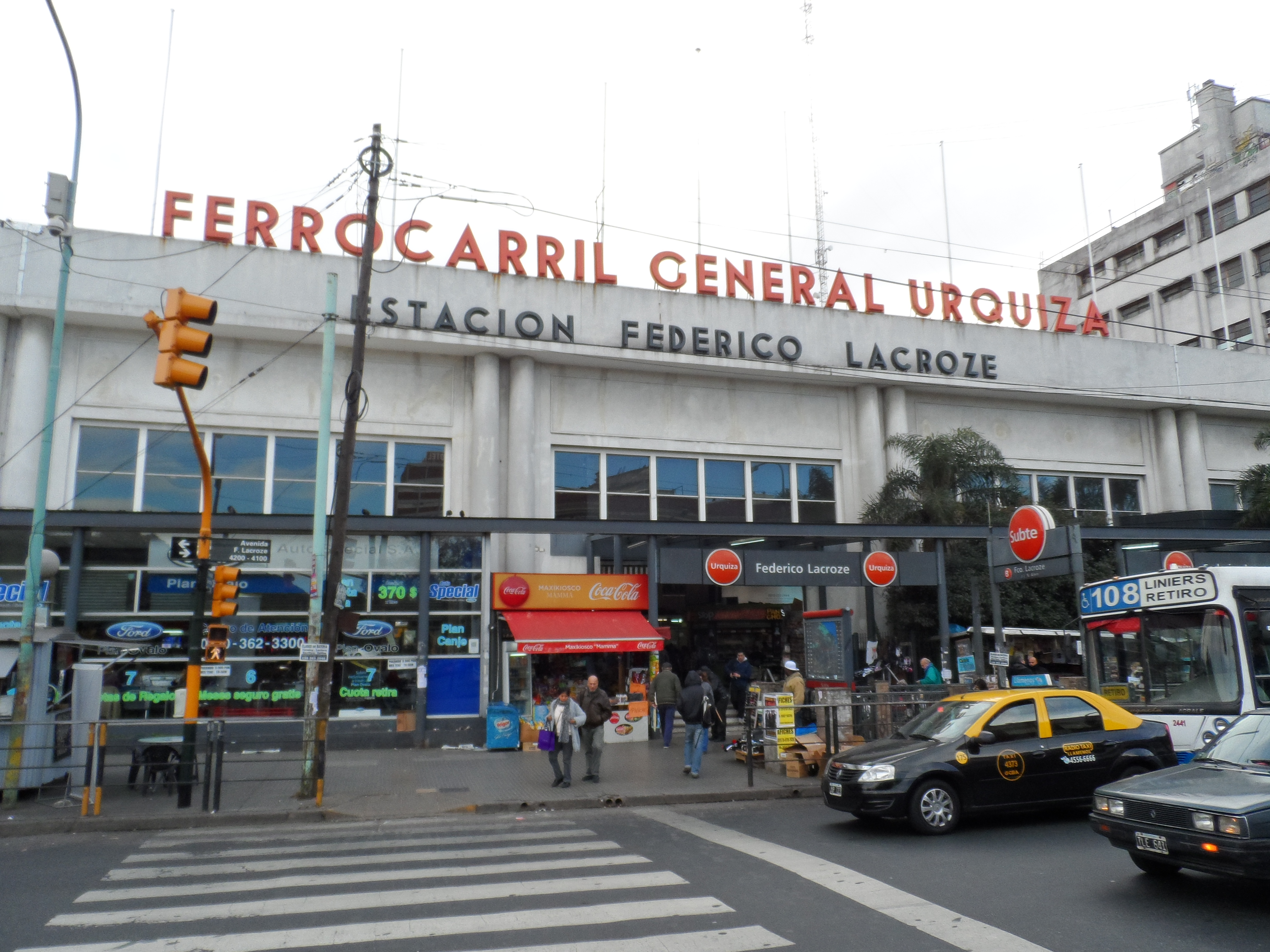
Facade

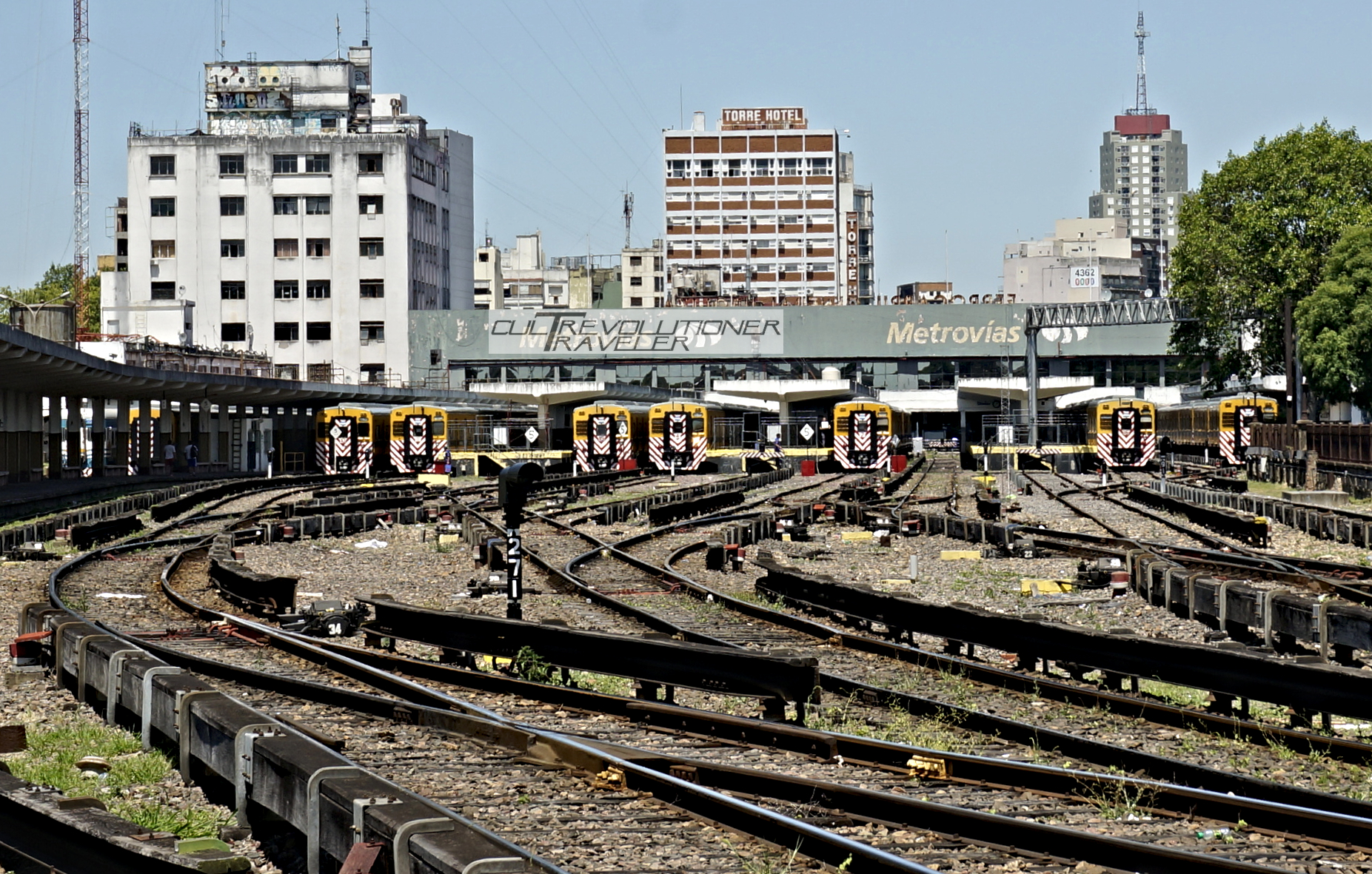
Aerial view

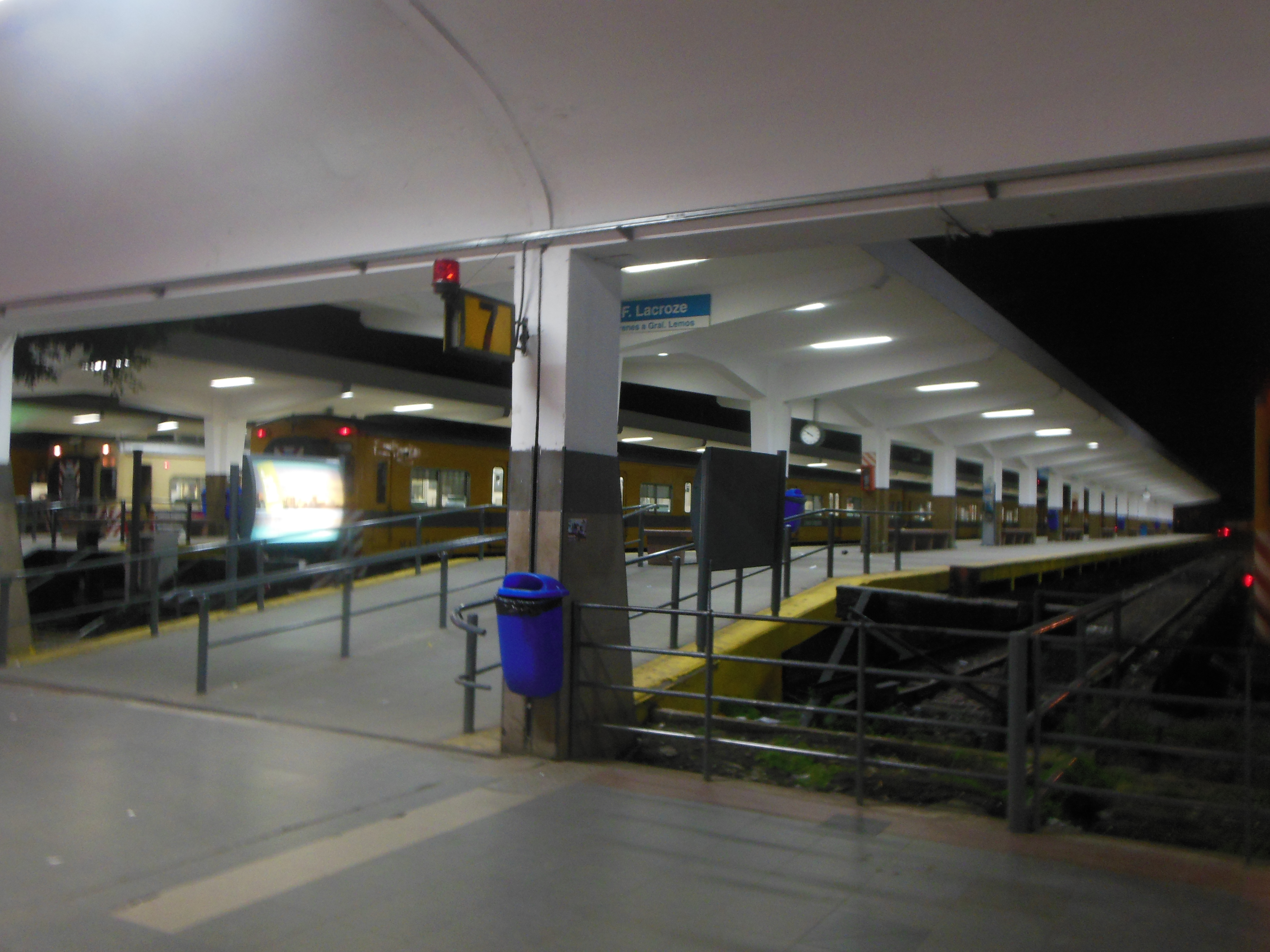
Platforms

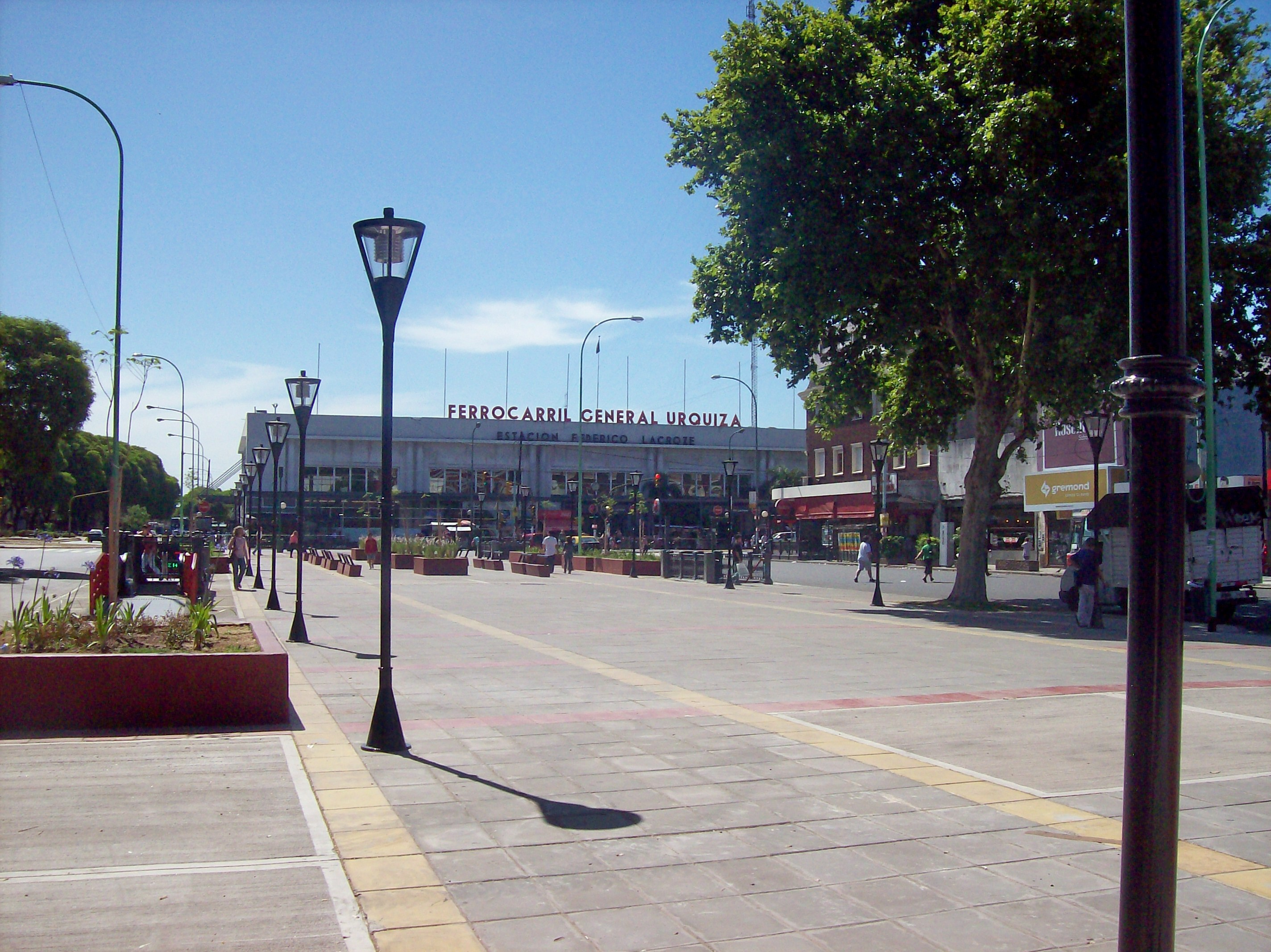
View from Corrientes Avenue

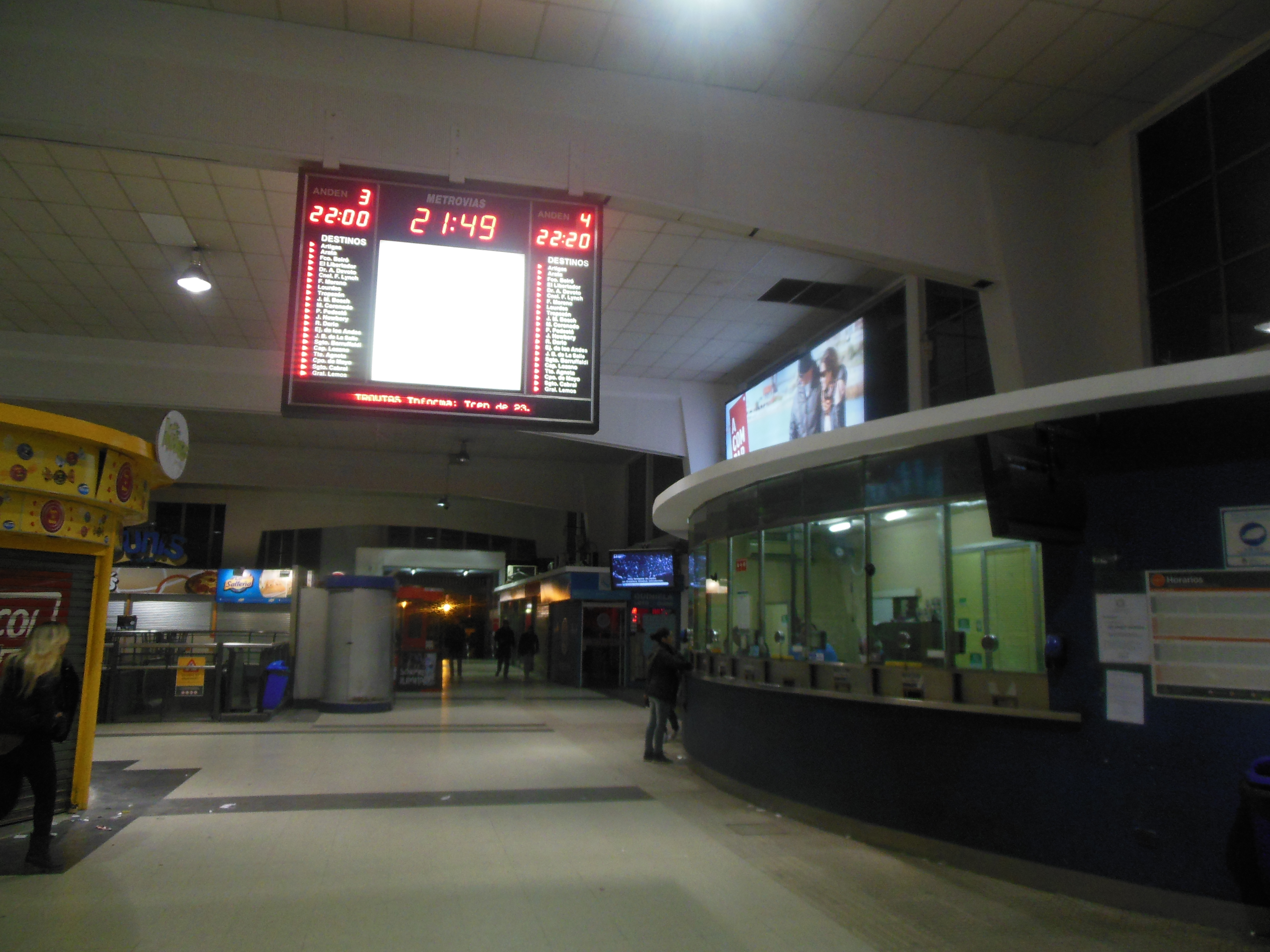
Hall and board

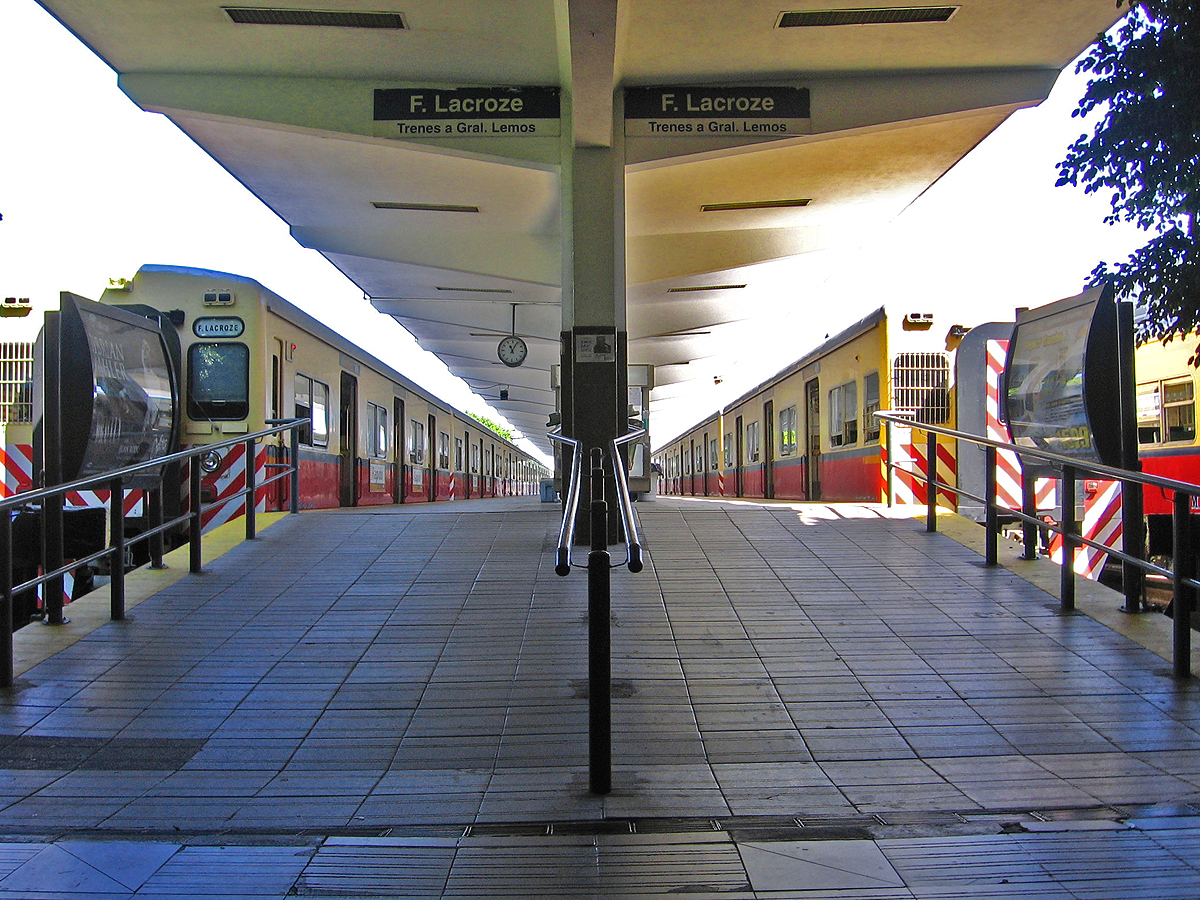
Train platforms

== See also ==
- General Urquiza Railway
- Metrovías
