= Ferrocarril Urquiza =

Ferrocarril Urquiza may refer to:

- The General Urquiza Railway, an Argentine standard gauge railway and former state railway company.
- UAI Urquiza, an Argentine Primera B Metropolitana football team in Greater Buenos Aires.

== See also ==
- Rail transport in Argentina
- Football in Argentina
