= La Chacarita =

La Chacarita may refer to:

- Chacarita, Buenos Aires, a barrio or district in Buenos Aires, Argentina
  - La Chacarita Cemetery (Cementerio de la Chacarita) in Buenos Aires, Argentina
- Ricardo Brugada (Asunción), mostly known as La Chacarita, a barrio (neighbourhood) of Asunción, Paraguay
