= Central Entre Ríos Railway =

Former rail company in Argentina (1883–1892)

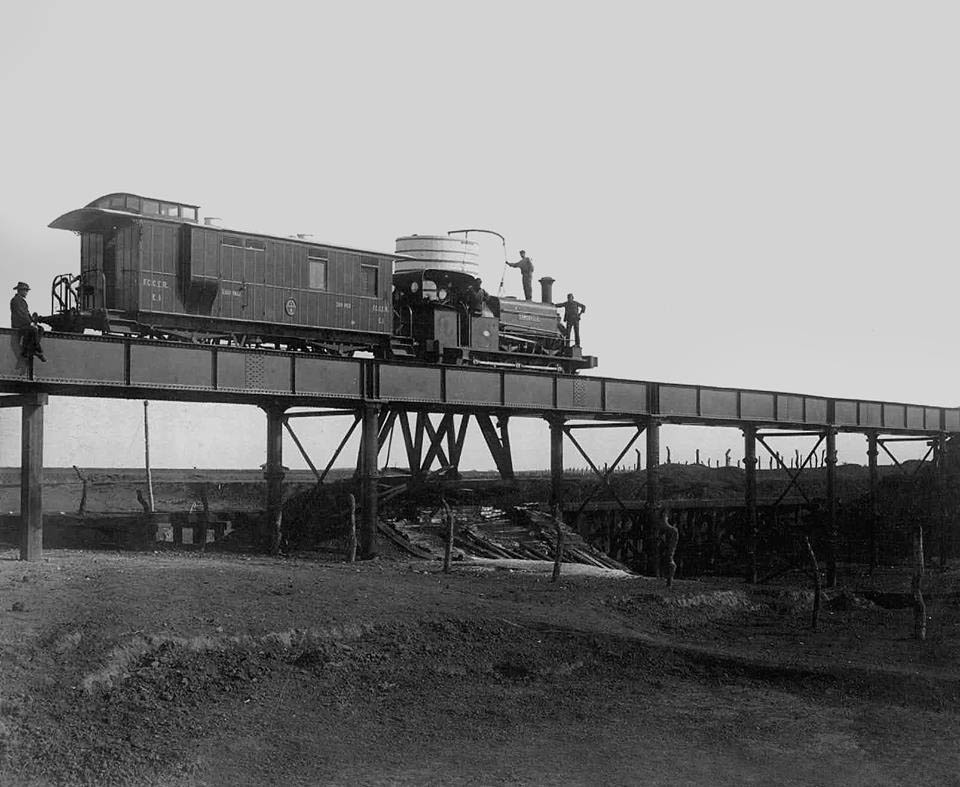
- CERR train crossing a bridge

Overview
- Native name: Ferrocarril Central Entrerriano
- Status: Defunct company; rail line active
- Owner: Government of Entre Ríos
- Locale: Entre Ríos
- Termini: Paraná; C. del Uruguay

Service
- Type: Inter-city

History
- Closed: 1892; 133 years ago (acquired by Entre Ríos Railway)

Technical
- Line length: 697 km (433 mi)
- Track gauge: 1,435 mm (4 ft 8 1/2 in)
Route map
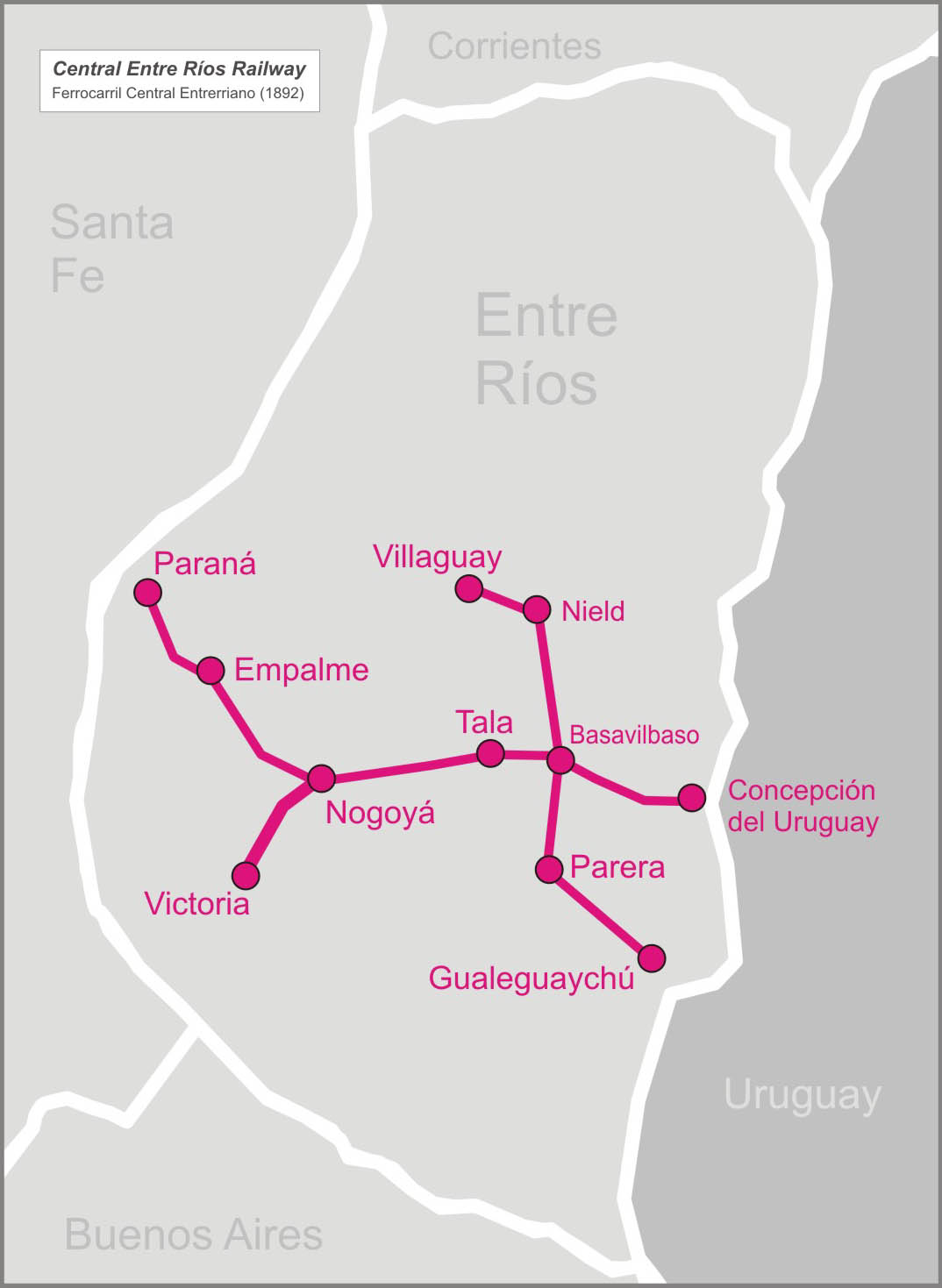

The Central Entre Ríos Railway (CERR) (in Spanish: Ferrocarril Central Entrerriano) was a railway company in the Entre Ríos Province of Argentina, owned by the provincial government, which built and operated a 1,435 mm (4 ft 8 1/2 in) standard gauge railway network between the rivers Paraná and Uruguay. In 1892 it was sold to the British–owned Entre Ríos Railway.

== History ==
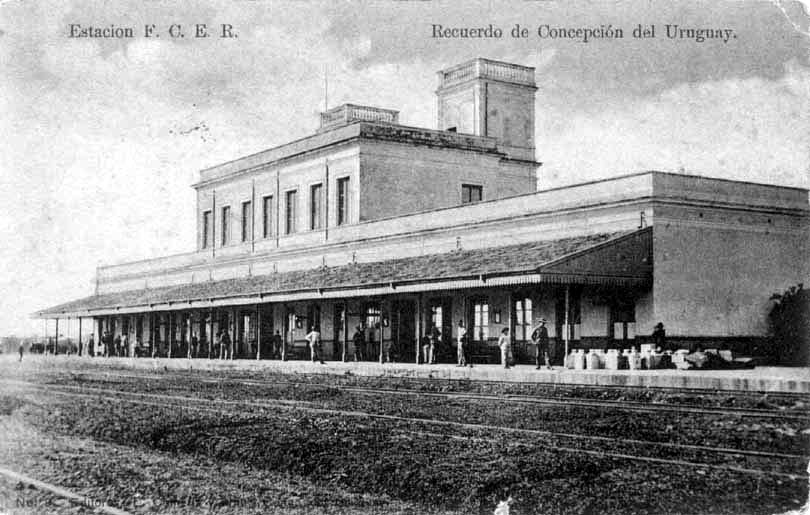
Concepción del Uruguay station c. 1890s

On 11 June 1883 the provincial government of Entre Ríos authorised the construction of a railway from Paraná, the provincial capital, to Concepción del Uruguay, on the River Uruguay, and on 7 January 1887 the construction of branch lines to Victoria, Gualeguay, Gualeguaychú and Villaguay.

The line from Paraná, via Nogoyá and Rosario del Tala to Concepción del Uruguay was opened between 13 May and 30 June 1887, the branch line from Nogoyá to Victoria on 26 June 1890, and those from Basavilbaso to Parera and to Villaguay and from Parera to Gualeguaychú on 20 and 23 September of the same year. Finally a branch line, was opened on 27 January 1891, from Tala to Gualeguay, where it joined the Gualeguay to Puerto Ruiz line operated by the Ferrocarril Primer Entrerrianno.

On 29 January 1892 the CERR was sold by the provincial government to the British-owned Entre Ríos Railway. Following nationalisation, the railway became part of the General Urquiza Railway.

== See also ==
- General Urquiza Railway
- Entre Ríos Railway
