= Trenes Especiales Argentinos =

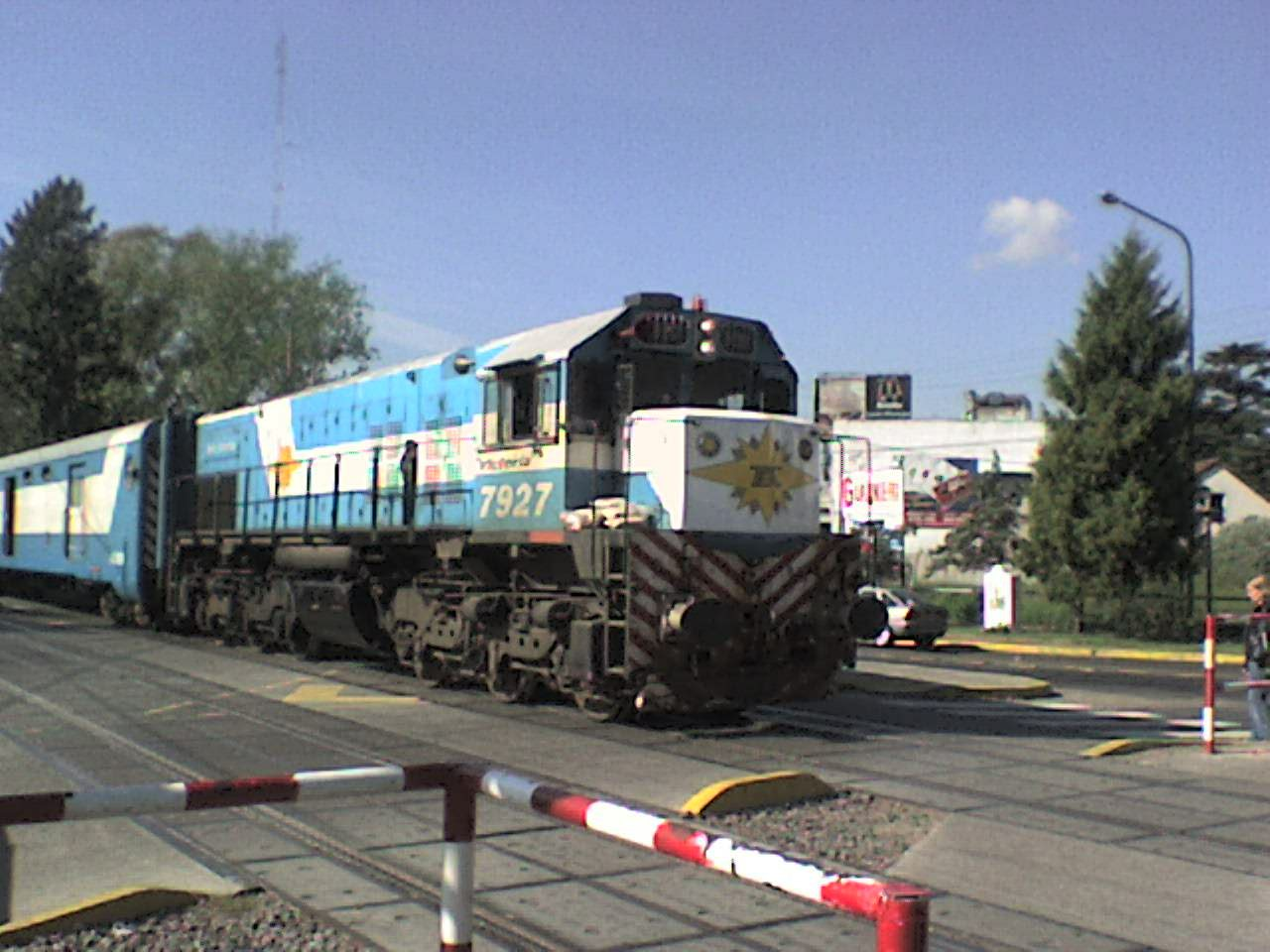
- El Gran Capitán crossing Hurlingham, 2008.
- Type: Private
- Industry: Railway
- Predecessor: Ferrocarriles Argentinos
- Founded: 2003; 23 years ago
- Defunct: 2011; 15 years ago
- Fate: Defunct
- Services: Rail transport

Trenes Especiales Argentinos (TEA) (English: Special Argentine Trains) was a private railway company in Argentina that operated trains from Buenos Aires to the city of Posadas in the Mesopotamia region.

== History ==
With the railway privatisation of the entire rail network carried out by Carlos Menem's administration in early 1990s, long-distance passenger services in Argentina had been closed by the National Government in 1993, leaving most of the Province without train services. In 2003, a concession was granted to private company "Trenes Especiales Argentinos" to operate services from Federico Lacroze terminus in Buenos Aires to the city of Posadas in Misiones Province on the border with Paraguay.

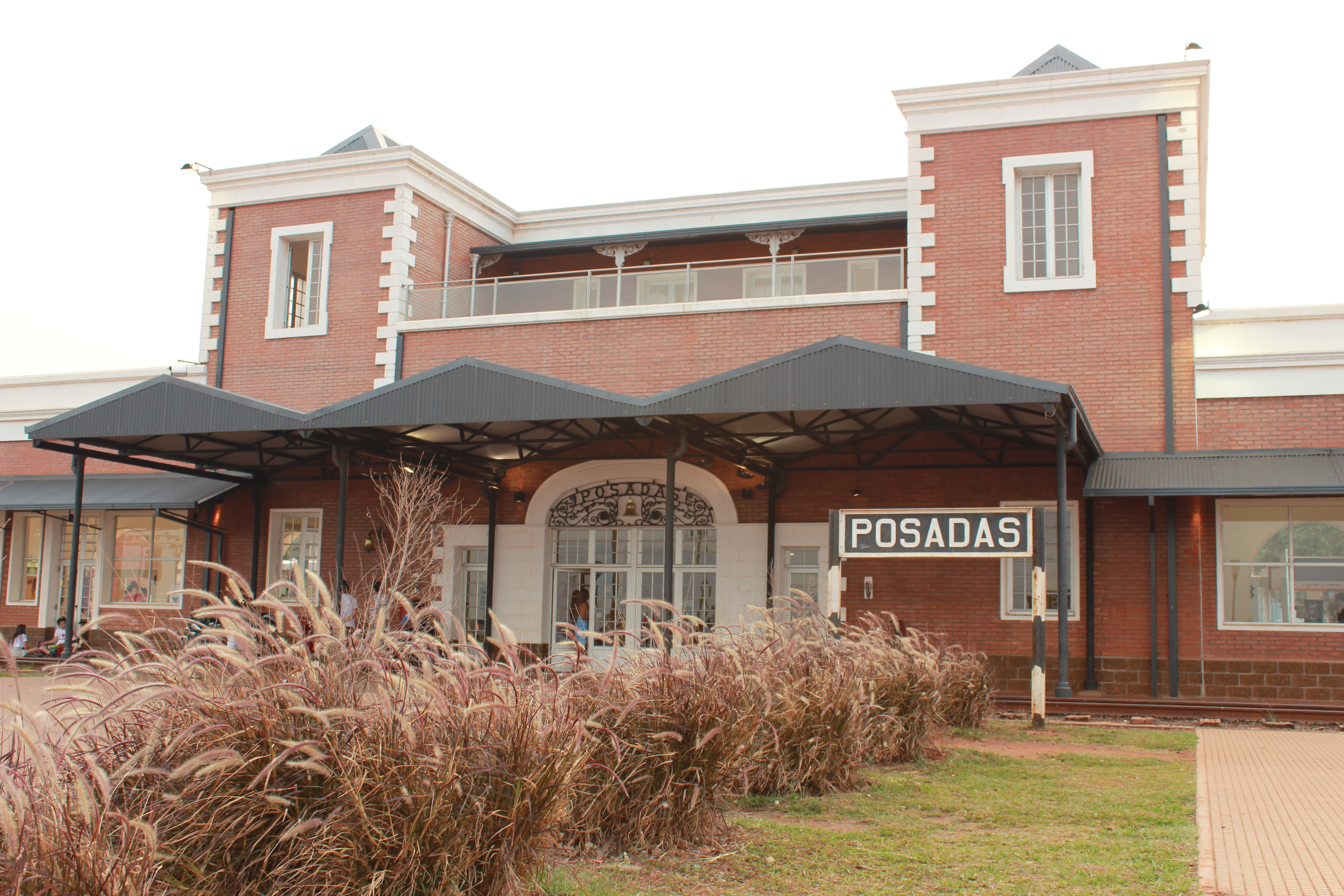
Posadas station, terminus.

The company put into operation a train (mostly known as El Gran Capitán - The Great Captain) powered by EMD G22 and General Electric U13 diesel locomotives with coaches that included first class and pullman classes.

Some stops along the way were Zárate in Buenos Aires Province, Basavilbaso and Villaguay in Entre Ríos Province, Monte Caseros and Santo Tomé in Corrientes Province, and numerous points between.

The total journey lasted approximately 26 hours. Trains departed twice weekly in each direction.

On December 15, 2011, the Government of Corrientes Province revoked the concession to TEA by decree N° 3010, alleging that "the company had not been authorised to provide the service to the public, apart from not fulfilling with security protocols, putting the life of passengers at risk, according to what the National Commission of Transport Regulations reported".

After the concession was revoked, the Government of Argentina established a service from Pilar, Buenos Aires Province to Posadas, operated by Trenes de Buenos Aires (TBA). When the concession to TBA was revoked after the Once station rail disaster in 2012, the service was also interrupted.
