= Villaguay Aerodrome =

Airport in Argentina

- IATA: none; ICAO: SAAU

Summary
- Airport type: Public
- Serves: Villaguay, Argentina
- Elevation AMSL: 141 ft / 43 m
- Coordinates: 31°51′00″S 59°04′23″W

Map
- Location of the airport in Argentina

Runways
Direction	Length		Surface
Direction	m	ft	Surface
18/36	1,190	3,904	Grass
- Source: Landings.com Google Maps

Villaguay Aerodrome (ICAO: SAAU) is a public use airport serving Villaguay, a city in the Entre Ríos Province of Argentina. The airport is 3 kilometres (2 mi) west of Villaguay.

The Salto VOR (Ident: STO) is located 61.2 nautical miles (113 km) east-northeast of the town.

== See also ==
- Transport in Argentina
- List of airports in Argentina
