= Colonia Avellaneda =

Coordinates: 31°46′01″S 60°24′14″W

- Municipality and village
- Interactive map of Colonia Avellaneda
- Country: Argentina
- Province: Entre Ríos Province
- Time zone: UTC−3 (ART)

Colonia Avellaneda is a village and municipality in Entre Ríos Province in north-eastern Argentina. It is part of the Gran Paraná urban agglomeration and has a population of approximately 3,030 inhabitants as of the 2010 census.

== Municipality overview ==
Colonia Avellaneda was established as a rural population center with a governing board on March 12, 1985, under decree No. 689/1985. The municipality was officially recognized by law No. 9573 on June 23, 2004, which sanctioned its census and jurisdiction. On February 4, 2005, it was formally created as a second-category municipality through decree No. 234/2005.

On December 10, 2011, the dual categories of municipalities in Entre Ríos were abolished, leading Colonia Avellaneda to transition from having a promotion board to being governed by a municipal president and a deliberative council consisting of seven members.

== Neighborhoods ==
Colonia Avellaneda comprises several neighborhoods, including:

- 200 Viviendas Este
- 200 Viviendas Oeste
- 400 Viviendas Norte
- 400 Viviendas Sur
- El Talar
- La Loma
- Las Acacias
- Las Lonjas
- Montorfano
- San Miguel
- Los Zorzales

== Transportation ==
The village is connected to the city of Paraná through bus lines 22 and AN, as well as to nearby localities such as San Benito and Oro Verde via line AM. Additionally, there is an urban train service operated by Operadora Ferroviaria S.E., which runs on weekdays from Paraná Station to the "Colonia Avellaneda" stop located in the 400 Viviendas neighborhood.

== Catholic parishes ==
In Colonia Avellaneda, the Catholic Church is represented by the parish of Santa Teresa de los Andes under the Archdiocese of Paraná.
