= Buenos Aires Central Railway =

Argentine railway company (1888–1948)

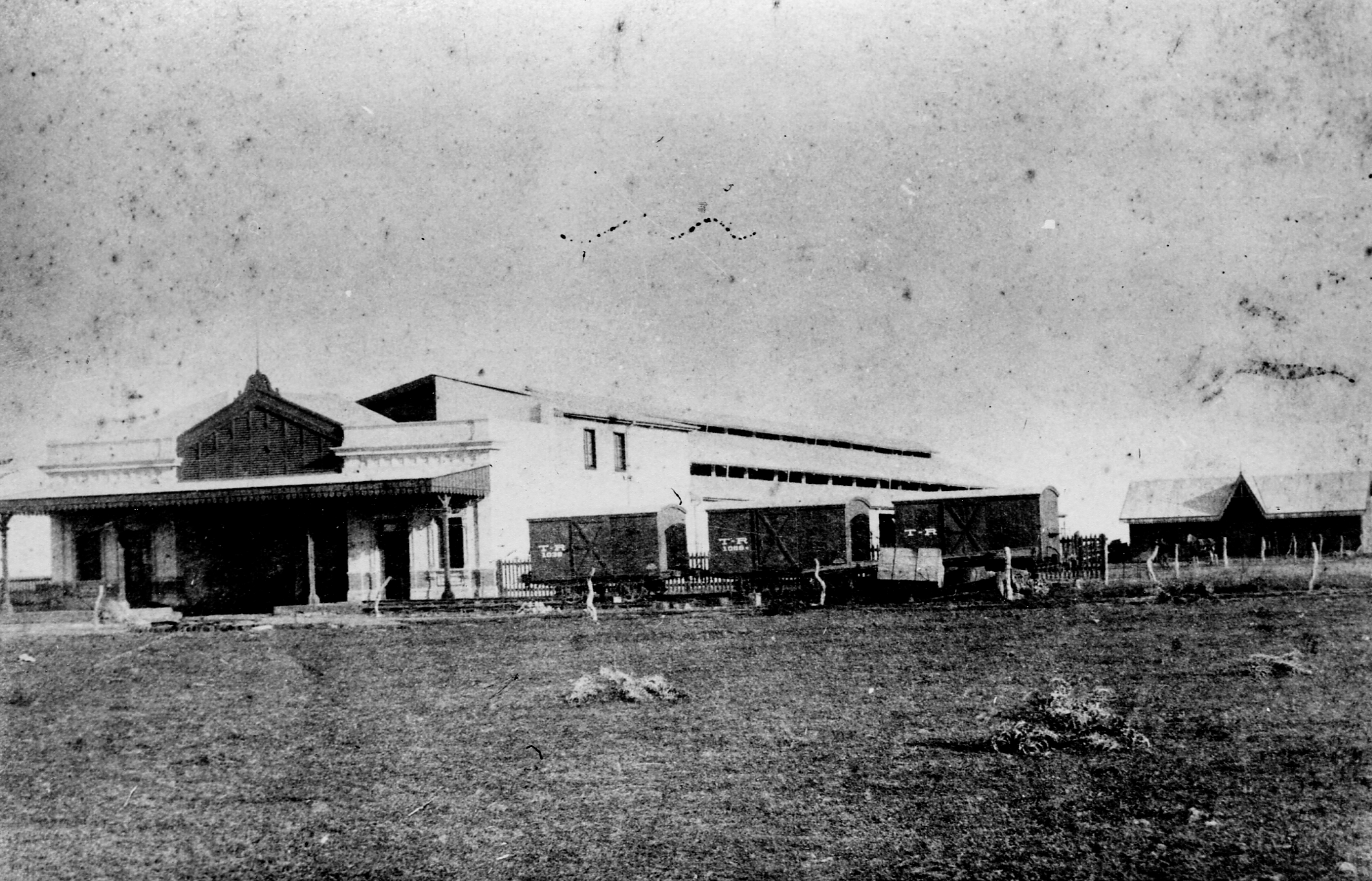
- Chacarita station (c. 1880s, located where current Federico Lacroze station stays today), terminus of the line

Overview
- Native name: Ferrocarril Central de Buenos Aires
- Status: Defunct company; some rail lines active
- Owner: Government of Argentina
- Locale: Buenos Aires, Santa Fe
- Termini: Chacarita; 4 de Febrero (Santa Fe) Zárate, Buenos Aires

Service
- Type: Inter-city

History
- Opened: 1888
- Closed: 1948; 77 years ago

Technical
- Track gauge: 1,435 mm (4 ft 8 1/2 in)
Route map
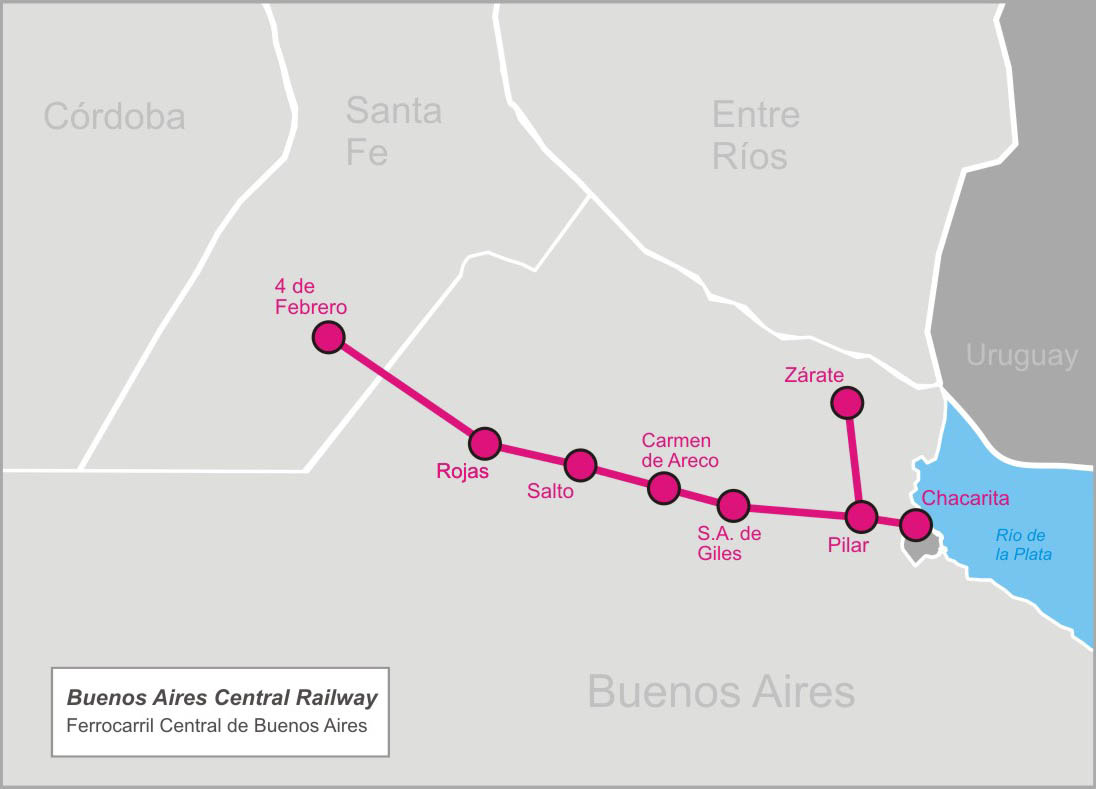

The Buenos Aires Central Railway (BACR) (in Spanish: Ferrocarril Central Buenos Aires) was an Argentine railway company which built and operated a 1,435 mm (4 ft 8 1/2 in) standard gauge railway line from Buenos Aires to the city of 4 de Febrero in Santa Fe.

== History ==
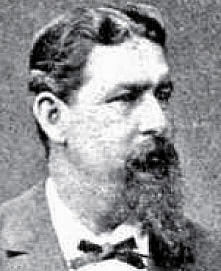
Federico Lacroze built the line to Zárate

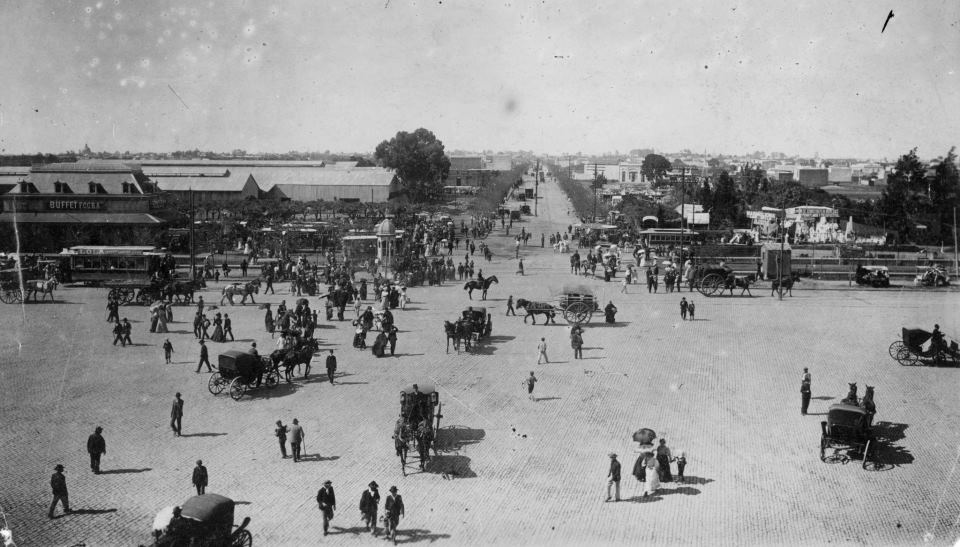
Chacarita terminus, c. 1910

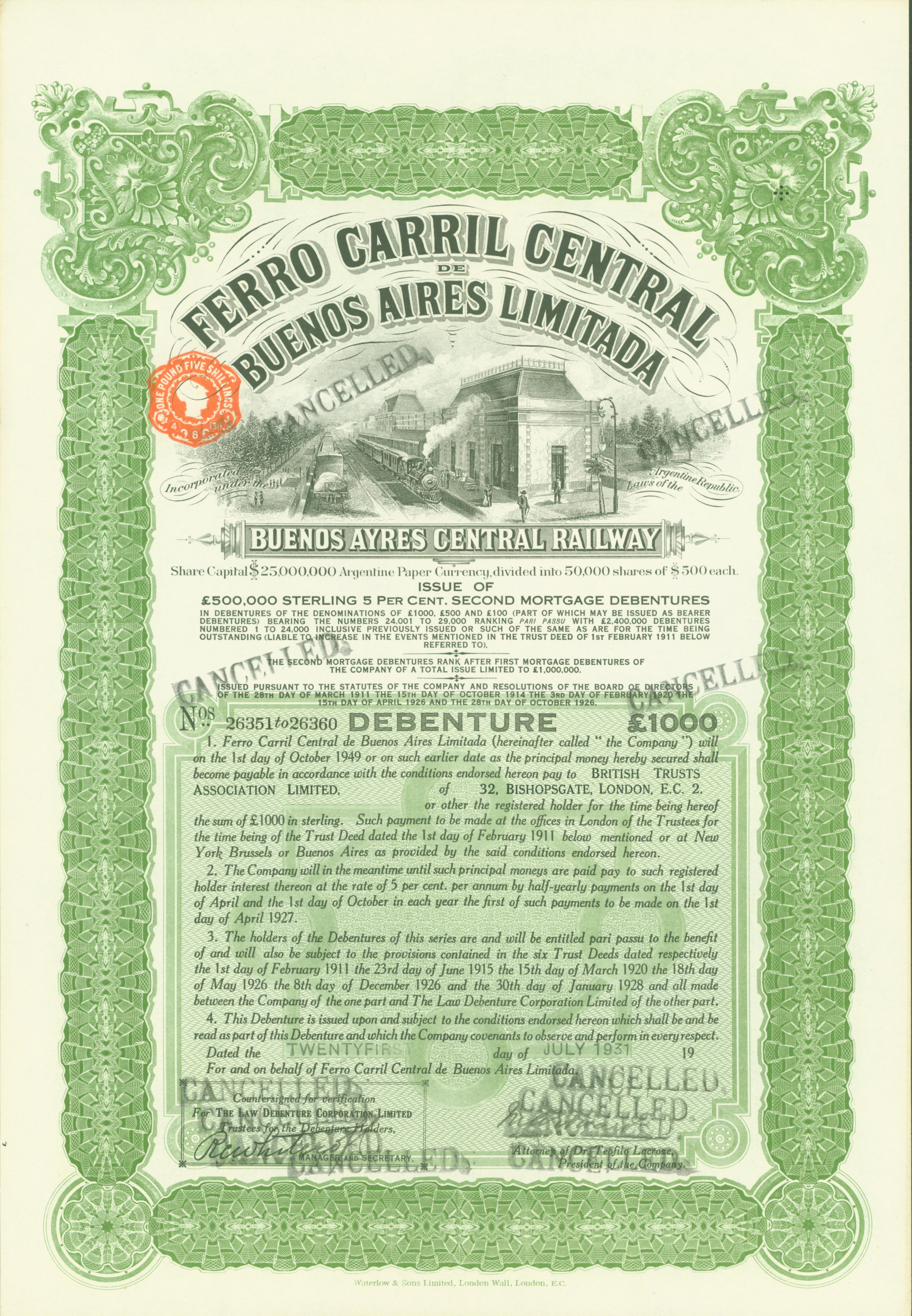
Bond of the Buenos Aires Central Railway, issued 21 July 1931

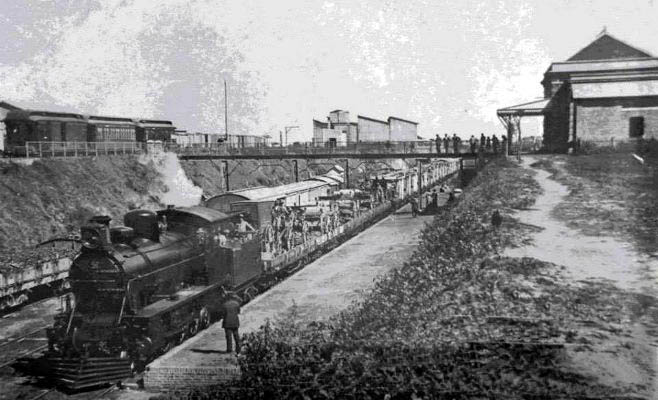
Train at Zárate station, 1914

On 2 October 1884 entrepreneur Federico Lacroze was granted a concession to build a 47 km horse-drawn railway from the Chacarita station of Buenos Aires (later demolished and replaced by Federico Lacroze terminus) to Pilar. On 6 April 1888 the line was opened by the "Tramway Rural" company and was extended by 53 km to Zárate on 27 July of the same year. From 1891 the company was allowed to operate trains using steam locomotives.

The BACR also planned to extend the line across the Santa Fe Province with the aim of reaching Villa María in Córdoba, but due to World War I the company could not import the materials needed to extend the line.

The BACR built another line from Fátima to Salto, reaching San Andrés de Giles on 24 May 1889, Heavy on 17 December 1892, Carmen de Areco on 15 March 1894 and finally Salto on 1 December 1896. On 26 August 1897 the company changed its name by Provincial decree to "Ferrocarril Rural de la Provincia de Buenos Aires" and on 11 October 1906 it changed its name again to "Ferrocarril Central de Buenos Aires". The line was extended from Salto to Rojas on 15 March 1909 and reached 4 de Febrero, on 29 July 1915.

In 1913 the BACR linked with the Entre Ríos Railway (ERR), which passengers took after crossing the river by ferry. Once the transhipment was done, the ERR carried passengers to the neighbouring cities of Asunción, Salto (Uruguay) and Uruguaiana (Brazil).

Branch lines to San Martín and to Campo de Mayo in Greater Buenos Aires were opened on 20 February 1911 and 30 November 1914, respectively. Interchange was possible with the French-owned 1,000 mm (3 ft 3 3/8 in) metre gauge line of the Compañía General de Buenos Aires in Salto, with the 5 ft 6 in (1,676 mm) broad gauge line of the British-owned Central Argentine Railway in San Martín (GBA) and with the 5 ft 6 in (1,676 mm) broad gauge line of the British-owned Buenos Aires and Pacific Railway in Caseros.

== See also ==
- Urquiza Railway
- Trams in Buenos Aires
