= Chacarita, Buenos Aires =

Coordinates: 34.587°S 58.4542°W

Chacarita
- Neighborhood of Buenos Aires
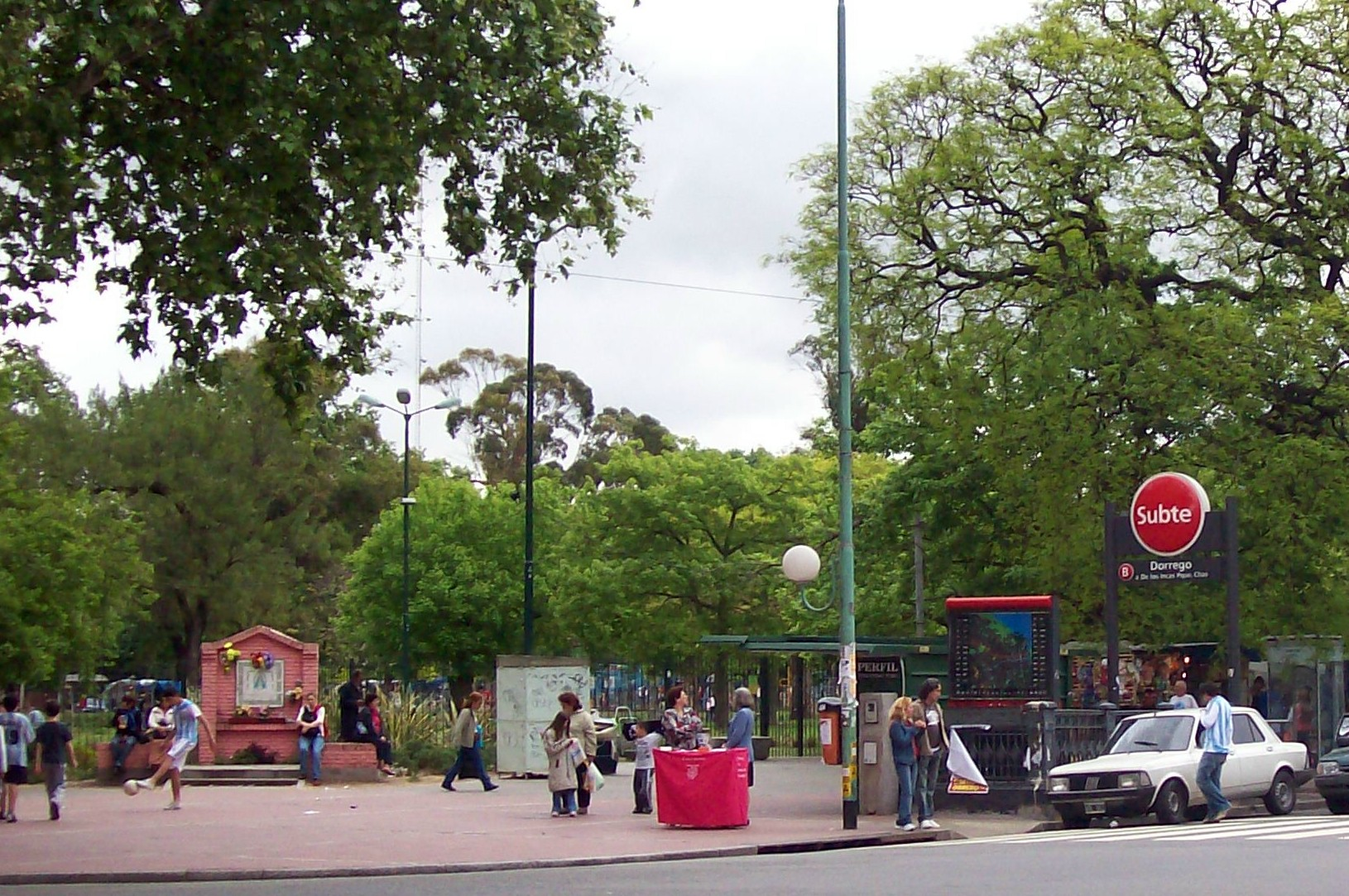
- Parque Los Andes

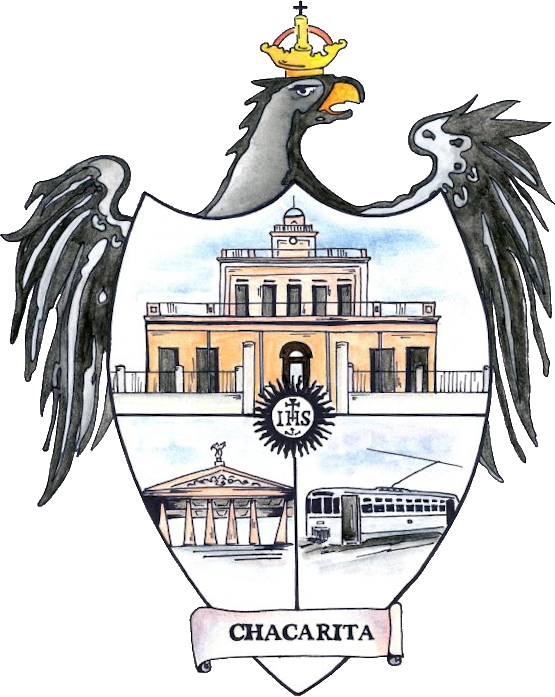
- Seal

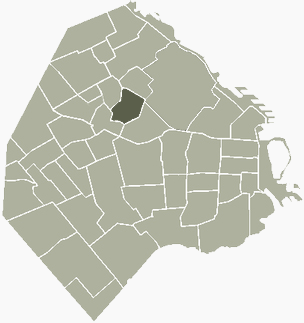
- Location of Chacarita within Buenos Aires
- Country: Argentina
- Autonomous City: Buenos Aires
- Comuna: C15

Area
  - Total: 2.8 km^{2} (1.1 sq mi)

Population (2001)
  - Total: 27,440
  - Density: 9,800/km^{2} (25,000/sq mi)
- Time zone: UTC-3 (ART)

Chacarita is a barrio or neighborhood in the north-central part of Buenos Aires, Argentina. Located between Colegiales, Palermo, Villa Crespo, La Paternal and Villa Ortúzar, this is a quiet neighbourhood with tree-lined streets, a combination of vintage rowhouses and apartment buildings. Locally, it's well known for the 95 hectare (234.75 acre) Chacarita Cemetery, home of the mausoleum of Gustavo Cerati, lead singer of Soda Stereo.

== History ==
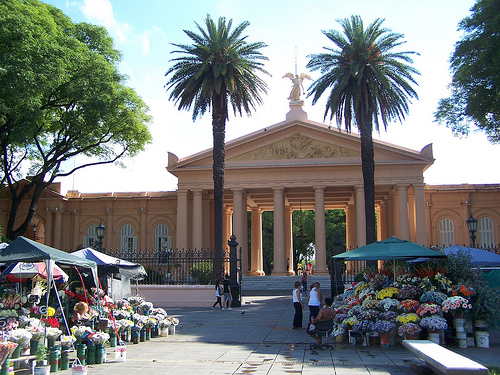
Entrance to Chacarita Cemetery

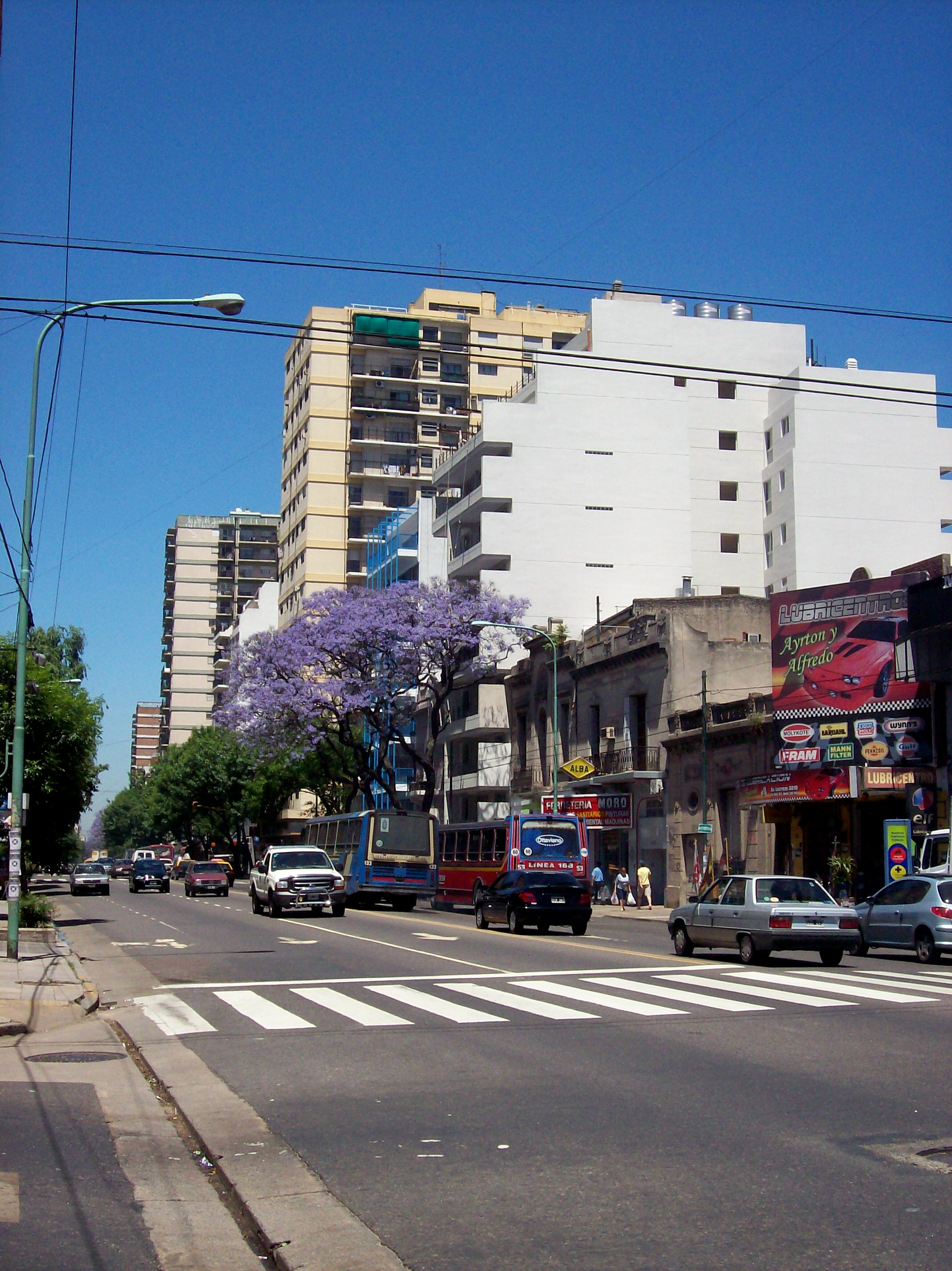
Avenida Federico Lacroze

The territories of this district belonged formerly to the Jesuits, who had small farms. Its name comes from the word "small farm" or chácara in old Spanish. Following the Suppression of the Jesuits in 1767, they were expelled and all their goods were declared property of the Crown.

One of the few and most important remaining residences from the era is that of the Comastri family, which at the moment is the Escuela Nacional de Educación Técnica N° 34.

The area's principal park is Los Andes, which was inaugurated in 1941. Chacarita is the namesake for both the Chacarita Cemetery and the Chacarita Juniors football club. The meeting place of the neighbourhood is the “Club Chacarita Juniors”.

== Transportation ==
Numerous important avenues and rail lines traverse the Chacarita district, among them the Urquiza and San Martín railway lines, and Elcano, Del Campo, Garmendía, Warnes, Dorrego, Álvarez Thomas and Córdoba Avenues. Jorge Newbery Avenue is characterized for being the only way funeral cars are allowed to go towards the cemetery, the main entrance of which is on Avenida Guzmán.

Federico Lacroze Station commuter rail terminal, which handles local and long-distance services, is also located in Chacarita.
