= Basavilbaso =

- Town
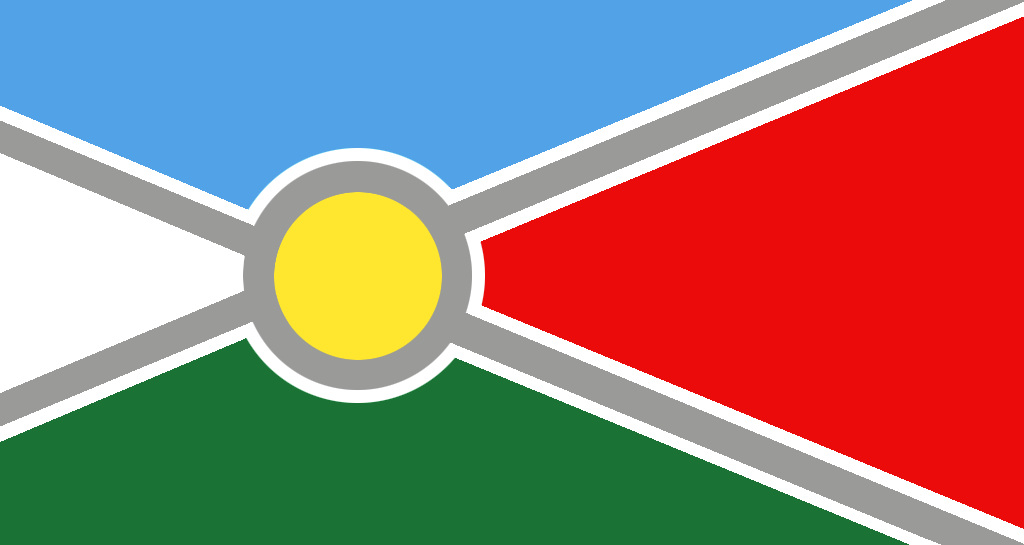
- Flag

- Location of Basavilbaso in Argentina
- Coordinates: 32°22′S 58°53′W
- Country: Argentina
- Province: Entre Ríos
- Department: Uruguay

Government
  - Mayor: Hernán Bessel

Population (2010)
  - Total: 9,742
- Time zone: UTC−3 (ART)
- CPA base: E3170
- Dialing code: +54 3445

Basavilbaso is a town in the center region of the province of Entre Ríos, Argentina, about 60 km (37 mi) from Concepción del Uruguay. It has about 9,700 inhabitants as per the 2010 census [INDEC]. Locals often shorten the name to Basso.

The town developed around the Gobernador Basavilbaso Station of the Ferrocarril Central Entrerriano railway company, which became part of Entre Ríos Railway in 1892. The first train arrived on 30 June 1887, and this is now regarded as the foundation date of Basavilbaso.

The town was first settled by Russian Jewish immigrants basically from Ukraine (Kherson Oblast) and Bessarabia. Basavilbaso was one of the first Jewish colonies in Argentina. These settlers formed the first agricultural cooperative in South America.

Jevel Katz, the popular Yiddish troubadour, wrote a song called Basavilbaso.

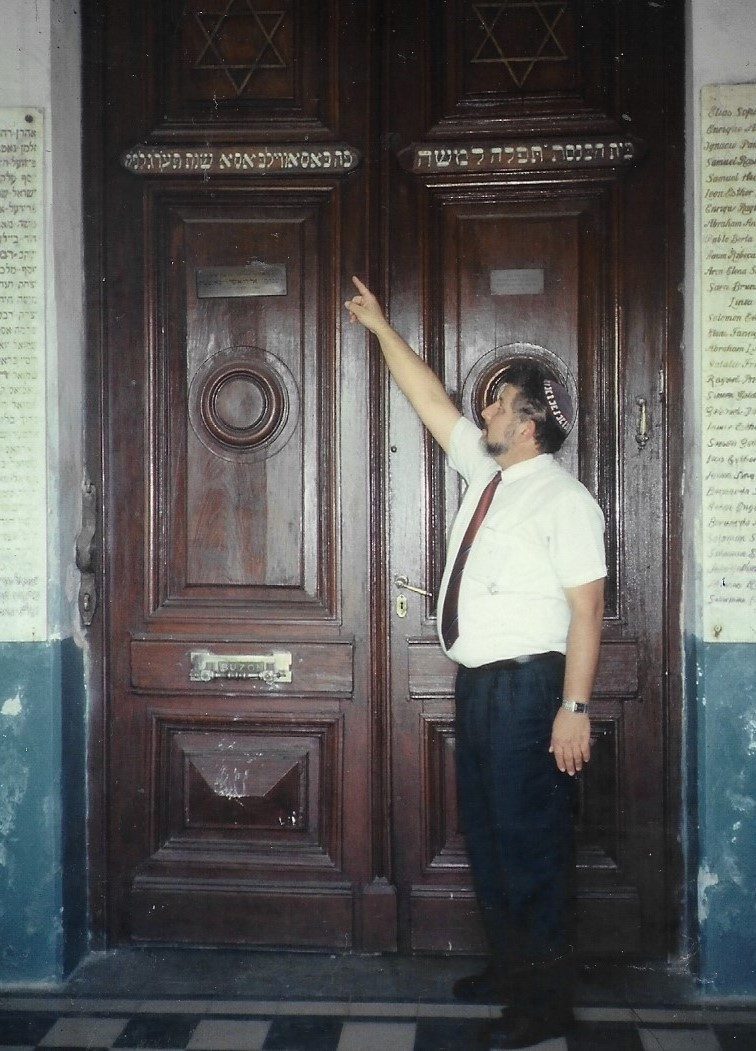
The "Prayer to Moses" synagogue in Basavilbaso

As "Jewish gauchos", they were recognized as the first to farm in an area where farming was non-existent. Other groups began to settle in the town: Italians, Volga Germans, and Russians.

== See also ==
- History of the Jews in Argentina
