= Villaguay =

- City
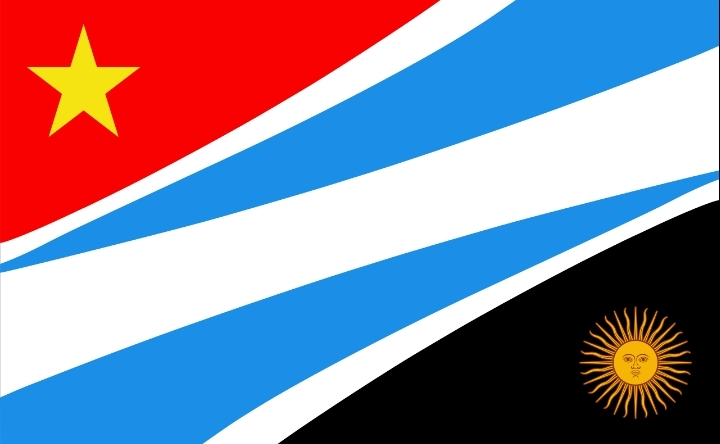
- Flag

- Location of Villaguay in Argentina
- Coordinates: 31°51′S 59°1′W
- Country: Argentina
- Province: Entre Ríos
- Department: Villaguay
- Founded: November 20, 1823

Government
  - Mayor: Claudia Monjo (Renovator Front)
- Elevation: 10 m (33 ft)

Population (2010 census)
  - Total: 49,445
- Time zone: UTC−3 (ART)
- CPA base: E3240
- Dialing code: +54 3455
- Website: Official website

Villaguay is a city in the province of Entre Ríos in the Argentine Mesopotamia. It has about 49,000 inhabitants as of the census 2010 and is the head town of the department of the same name.

The city lies near the geographic center of the province, east of the Gualeguay River, on National Route 18 (which links it to Paraná, the provincial capital, located 155 km to the west, and to Concordia, 120 km east). The area is served by Villaguay Aerodrome (ICAO: SAAU) at 31°51′S 59°5′W.

The earliest records of European settlement date to 1790. In the nineteenth century, Spanish, Jewish, French, Italian, Volga German, and Belgian communities were established in the area. In 1873, Villaguay, previously administered by military commanders, became a municipality.
