= Uruguay Station =

Uruguay Station or Uruguai Station may refer to:

- Uruguay (Milan Metro), a metro station on the Milan Metro
- Uruguay (Buenos Aires Underground), an underground station on Line B of the Buenos Aires Underground
- Uruguay, an underground station on Line G (Buenos Aires Underground)
- Uruguai Station, a metro station in Rio de Janeiro
