= Line G (Buenos Aires Underground) =

Future metro line in Buenos Aires

Line G

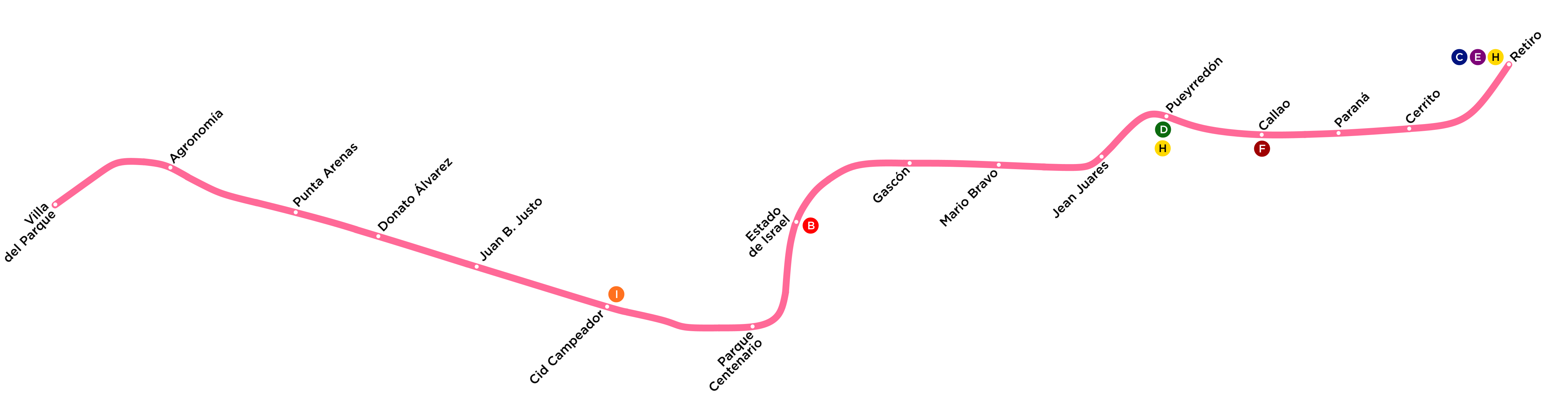
- Route map as planned in Law 670

Overview
- Status: Planned (postponed)
- Termini: Retiro; Cid Campeador
- Stations: 11

Service
- Type: Rapid transit
- System: Buenos Aires Underground

Technical
- Line length: 7.3-kilometer (4.5 mi) (Law 670)
- Character: Underground
- Track gauge: 1,435 mm (4 ft 8 1/2 in)

Line G is a planned addition to the Buenos Aires Underground which has been on the drawing board in numerous forms since the 1930s. After a failed attempt at financing and building the line in 2009, its most recent proposal was put forward in 2015 by the government of Buenos Aires.

Construction has not begun as of 2026.

== History ==
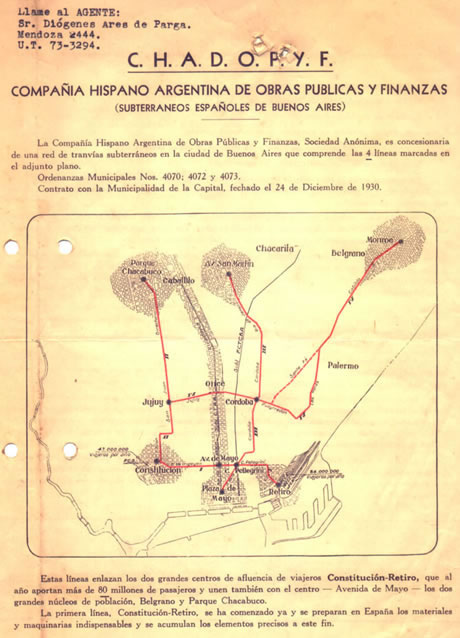
The original plan proposed by CHADOPyF includes large parts of what today is known as Line G.

The history of Line G dates back to 1930 when the Hispano-Argentine Company for Public Works and Finances (CHADOPyF) was tasked with expanding the network following the construction of Line A by the Anglo-Argentine Tramways Company. The company had been tasked with building four new lines, with Line 3 running from Plaza de Mayo to the intersections of San Martín and Gaona Avenues, the current location of the Sid Campeador monument, which would be built in 1935. By 1932, the original plans had been revised twice and the number of projected lines was reduced to three, with parts of lines 3 and 4 being merged into a new Line 3 (today known as Line D), and the western section of Line 3 being left on the drawing board, later to re-emerge as the planned Line G.

=== Law 670 ===
On 8 November 2001, the government of the City of Buenos Aires established a law outlining the future expansion of the Underground network, which included three new lines; F, G and I, as well measures for the advancement of Line H. Line G would start at Retiro Mitre railway station and then head west, terminating at the Cid Campeador monument, near Parque Centenario in the Caballito neighborhood.

Network map according to law 670

Proposed PETERS 3 network map

The Retiro - Cid Campeador line, which was to stretch 7.3km and have 11 station, was then planned as follows:

- Retiro
- Cerrito
- Uruguay
- Callao
- Pueyrredón
- Jean Juares
- Mario Bravo
- Gascón
- Estado de Israel
- Parque Centenario
- Cid Campeador

By December 2009, the City of Buenos Aires had made significant advances in negotiating financing and construction equipment from Exim Bank of China and China Railway Group Limited (CREC). The construction of the line was to be done with tunnel boring machines, allowing for the tunnel to advance an average of 15 metres per day and the CREC would be in charge of all aspects of construction and sourcing of materials as well as rolling stock. By early 2011, it was announced that the government had obtained financing for $1.4 billion for the line and was to begin construction in 2012, concluding in 2016. The line was to be 12.5km long and terminate further west at Villa del Parque, continuing on from the Sid Campeador terminus envisioned in Law 670. However, once the project had reached the Buenos Aires City Legislature for consideration, many aspects of the deal were questioned, including the cost of the line which was estimated to be significantly cheaper ($1 billion) if built directly by the city. Following these concerns and questions, construction was postponed indefinitely later that year.

=== PETERS Plan ===
In 2015 new plans for the Underground were published by the City of Buenos Aires. As part of this new plan, Line G was re-designed completely, running through the financial district of the city in between Line F and Line C before running westwards towards Palermo, proximately parallel to and just north of Line D. It was proposed that construction on the line was to begin sometime after construction began on the proposed Line F.
