= Pasteur station =

Pasteur station could refer to:

- Pasteur station (Paris Metro), on the Paris Metro
- Pasteur (Milan Metro), on the Milan Metro
- Pasteur - AMIA (Buenos Aires Underground), on the Buenos Aires Underground
