= Facultad de Medicina (Buenos Aires Underground) =

Buenos Aires Underground station

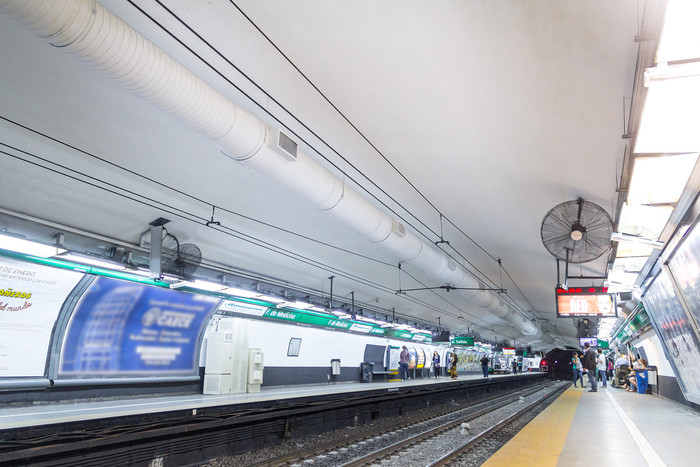

General information
- Location: Av. Córdoba between Junín and J.E. Uriburu
- Coordinates: 34°35′59.2″S 58°23′51.6″W
- Platforms: Side platforms

History
- Opened: 23 February 1940

Services
Preceding station	Buenos Aires Underground	Following station
Pueyrredón towards Congreso de Tucumán	Line D	Callao towards Catedral
Location

Facultad de Medicina is a station on Line D of the Buenos Aires Underground. The station was opened on 23 February 1940 as part of the extension of Line D from Tribunales to Palermo. It owes its name to the UBA Faculty of Medical Sciences, which previously had its seat above the station. The complex above the station is now home to the Faculty of Economic Sciences.

== Gallery ==
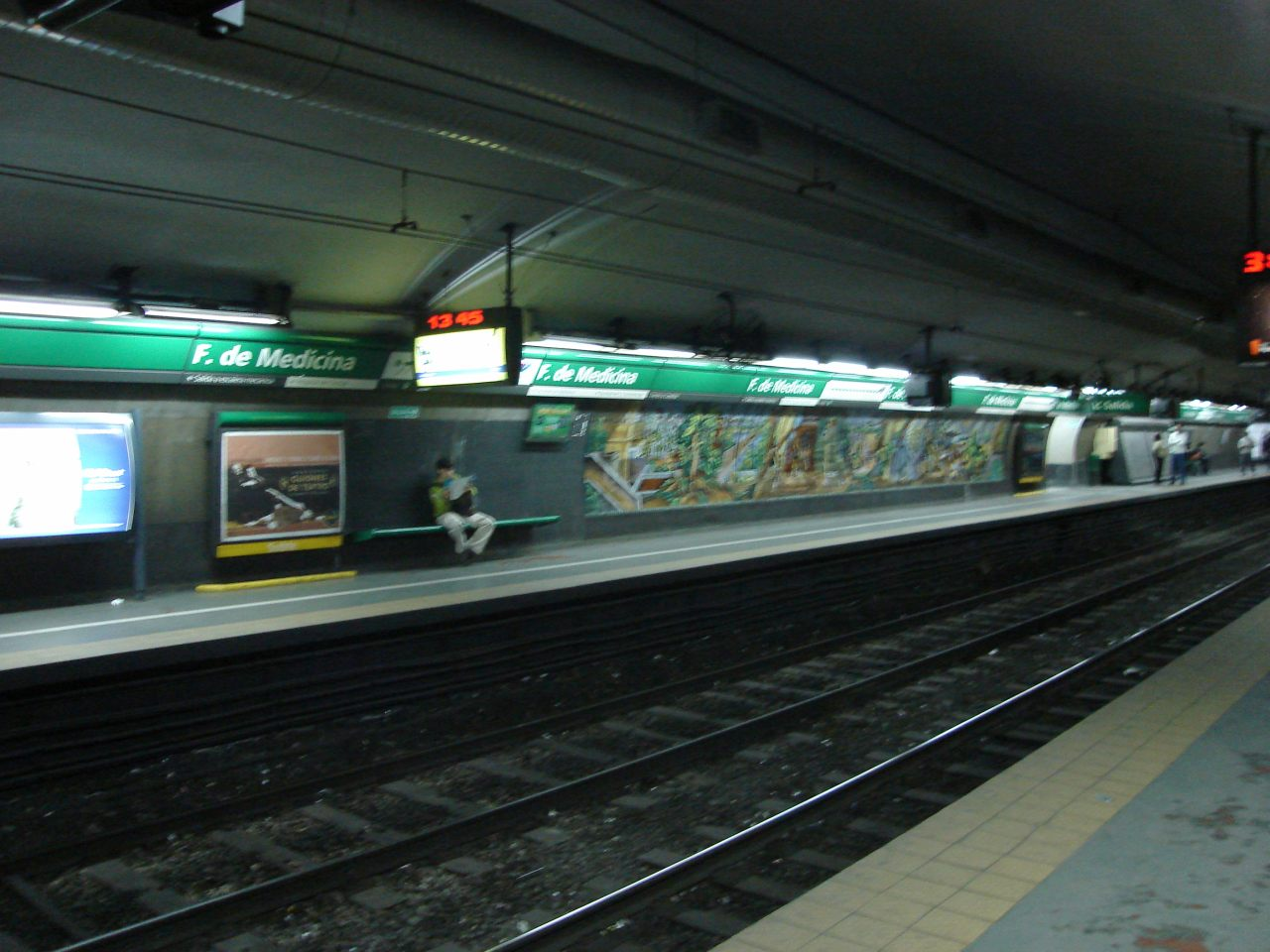

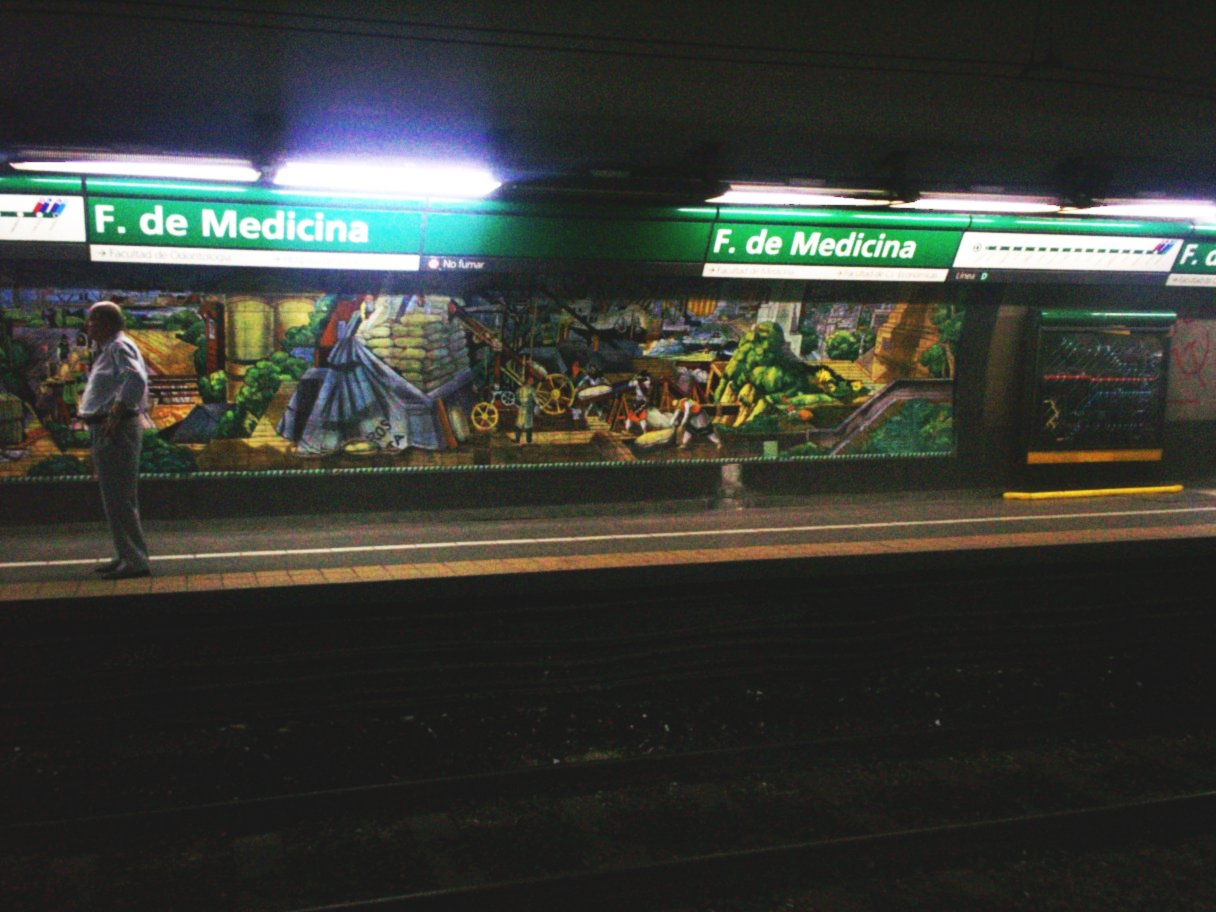

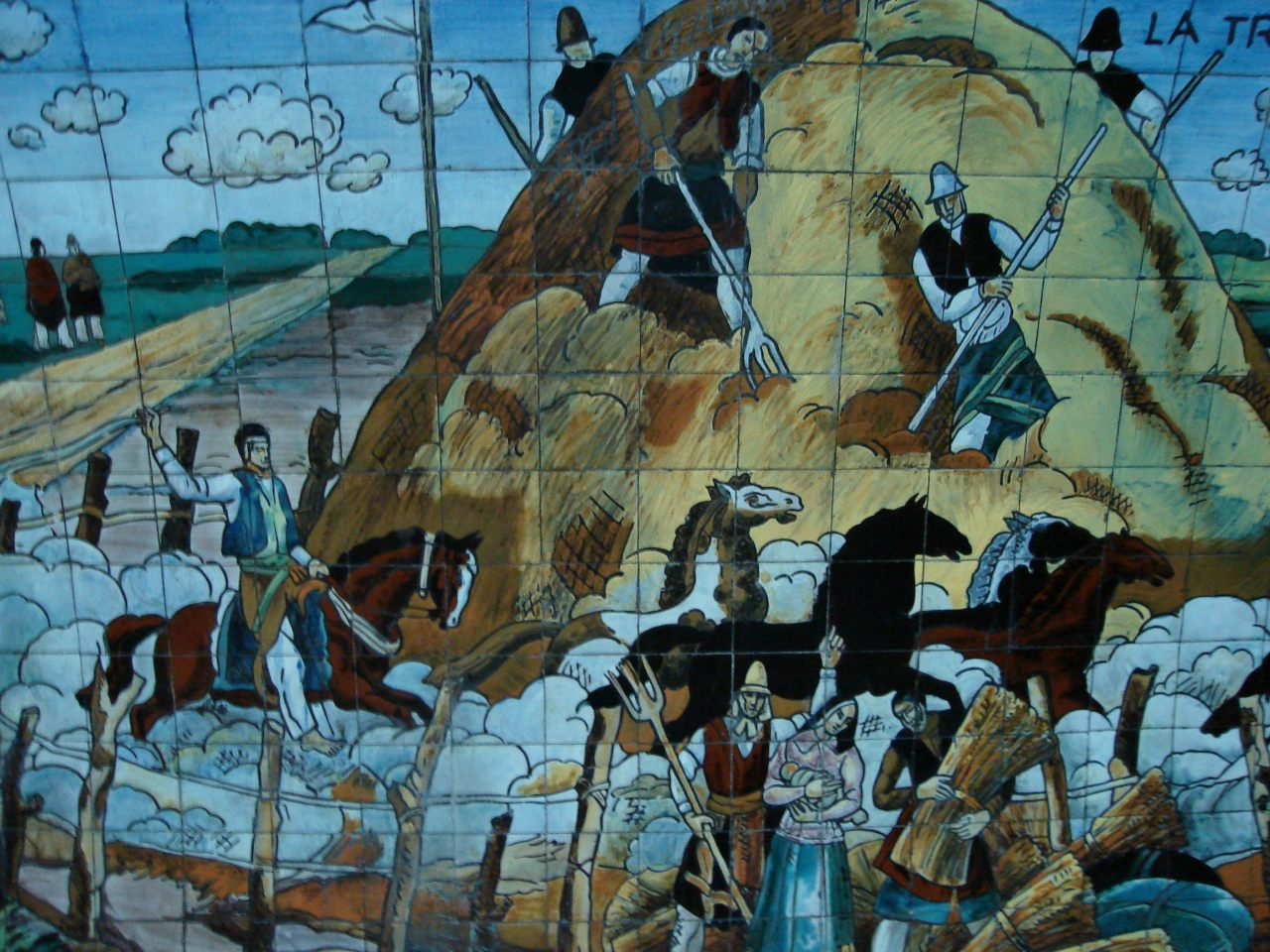

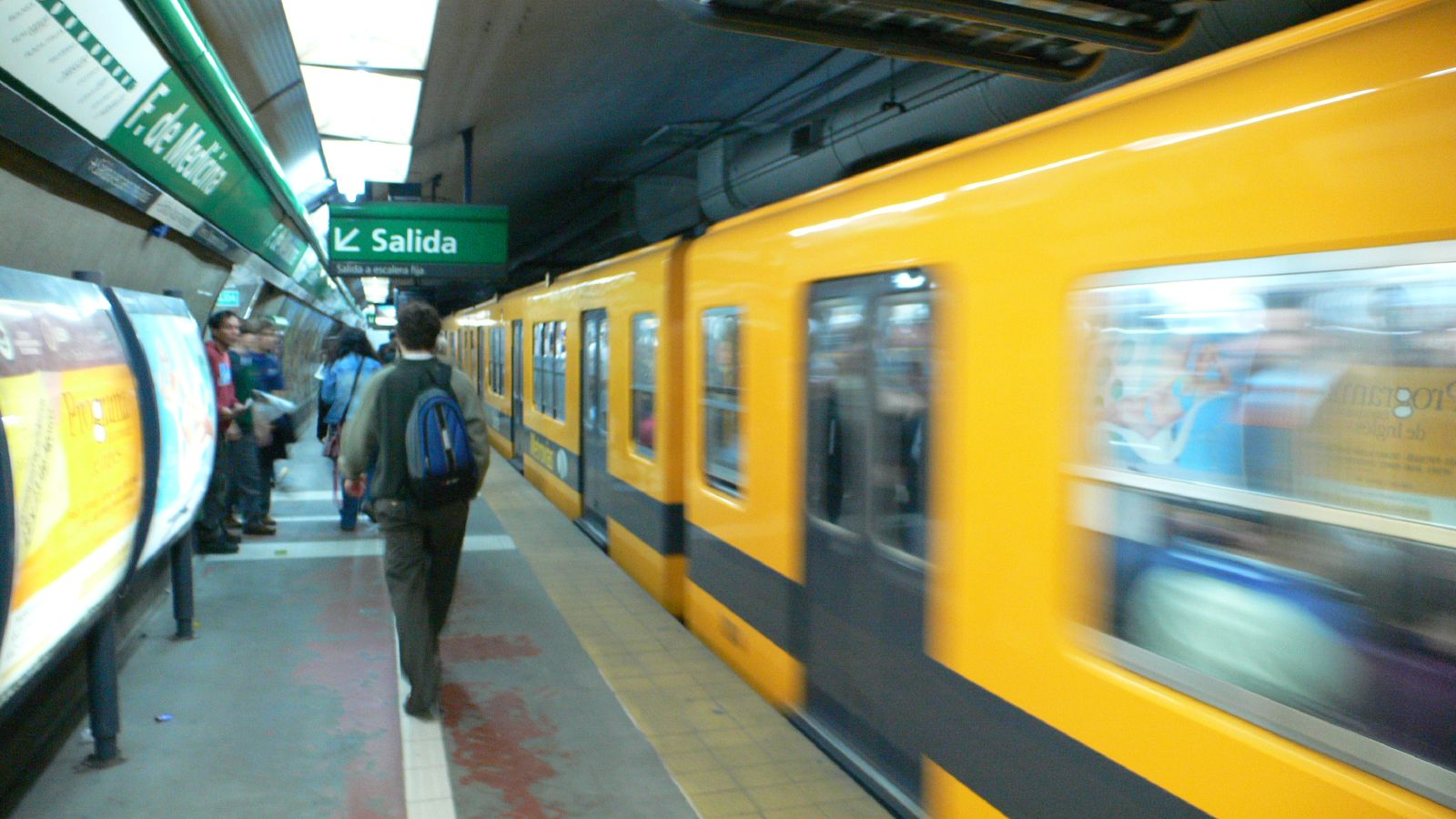
