= Line F (Buenos Aires Underground) =

Future metro line in Buenos Aires

Line F

- Network with line F, H and I complete

Overview
- Status: In development
- Termini: Constitución; Plaza Italia
- Stations: 12 (in the first stsge)

Service
- Type: Rapid transit
- System: Buenos Aires Underground
- Operator(s): Metrovías

History
- Opened: After 2031 (planned)

Technical
- Line length: 8.6km
- Character: Underground
- Track gauge: 1,435 mm (4 ft 8 1/2 in)

Line F is a planned addition to the Buenos Aires Underground. In 2019, the government of Buenos Aires was looking for a group to create a plan of the line, but this study was cancelled in 2022. The city decided to create a study with their own staff, which is still underway as of 2024. The estimated cost of the project has risen from 800 million dollars, to 2 billion USD. The layout, developed in two stages, will connect with all existing Underground lines, seek to alleviate congestion on Line C, and improve connectivity between the south and north of the city. The inauguration of the first section is scheduled for 2031 or later, with construction to begin in 2026.

== Overview ==
Permission to construct the line was originally granted in 2001, in a sanction which also included lines H (partially completed) and line I (not started).

The line is set to be the most modern in the network, using automatic trains, a communications-based train control system like the one being installed on Line C, and platform screen doors.

The line is also expected to have the highest ridership when compared to the existing lines, at 600,000 riders annually. In the 2019 tender, eight of the thirteen stations were connected to other lines on the network.

=== Line E ghost stations ===
In 2006, it was considered whether the two Line E ghost stations (San José vieja and Constitución) could be used as the southern point of Line F, considering they overlapped the line's trajectory. However, it was later decided that Line F would use a completely new tunnel with new stations given the frequency the line is expected to have.

== Line plan ==
P. Italia - Constitución:

- Plaza Italia
- Salguero
- Sánchez de Bustamante
- Pueyrredón
- Santa Fe
- Córdoba
- Corrientes
- Rivadavia
- México
- San Juan
- Sáenz Peña
- Constitución
