= Line G =

Line G may refer to:

- Line G (Buenos Aires Underground)
- G Line (Los Angeles Metro)
- Line G (New York)
- Ginza Line
- Green Line (Yokohama)

== See also ==
- Line GR (Washington Metro)
