= Callao (Line D Buenos Aires Underground) =

Buenos Aires Underground station

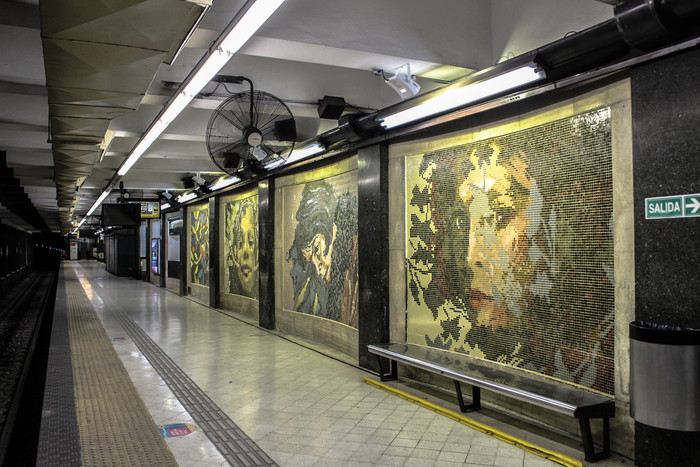

General information
- Location: Av. Córdoba and Av. Callao
- Coordinates: 34°35′58.7″S 58°23′35.2″W
- Platforms: Side platforms

History
- Opened: 23 February 1940

Services
Preceding station	Buenos Aires Underground	Following station
Facultad de Medicina towards Congreso de Tucumán	Line D	Tribunales towards Catedral
Location

Callao is a station on Line D of the Buenos Aires Underground. The station was opened on 23 February 1940 as part of the extension of Line D from Tribunales to Palermo.

It is located at the intersection of avenues Córdoba and Callao.
