= Plaza Italia (Buenos Aires Underground) =

Metro station in Buenos Aires

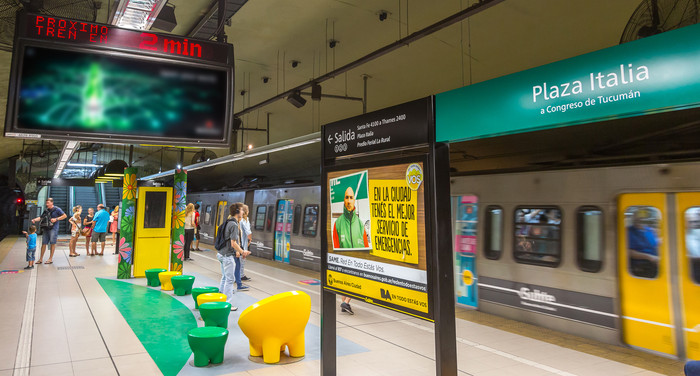

General information
- Location: Av. Santa Fe between J.L. Borges and Thames
- Coordinates: 34°34′53.4″S 58°25′15.9″W
- Platforms: Island platforms

History
- Opened: 23 February 1940

Services
Preceding station	Buenos Aires Underground	Following station
Palermo towards Congreso de Tucumán	Line D	Scalabrini Ortiz towards Catedral
Location

Plaza Italia station is part of the line D of the Buenos Aires Underground. It is located at the intersection of Avenida Santa Fe and the roundabout surrounding Plaza Italia in Palermo. The station was opened on 23 February 1940 as part of the extension of Line D from Tribunales to Palermo.

A short distance from the station are the La Rural fairgrounds, owned by the Sociedad Rural Argentina, the former Buenos Aires Zoo (now "EcoParque"), and the Botanical Garden.

In 1997 the station was declared a national historic monument.

== Gallery ==
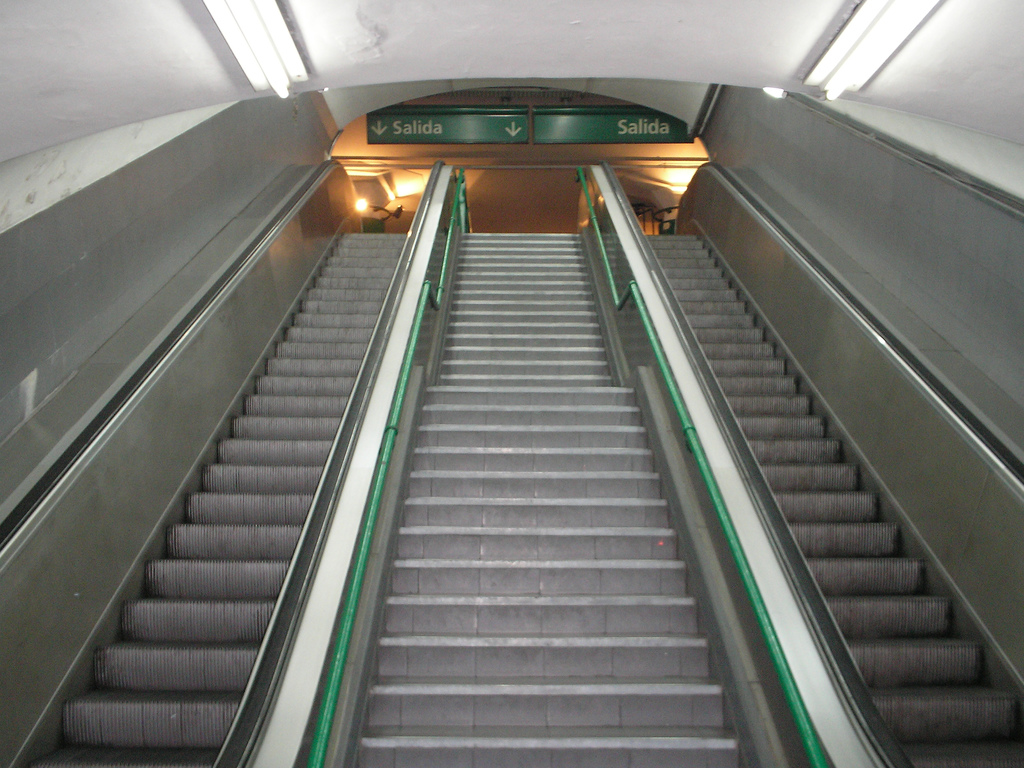

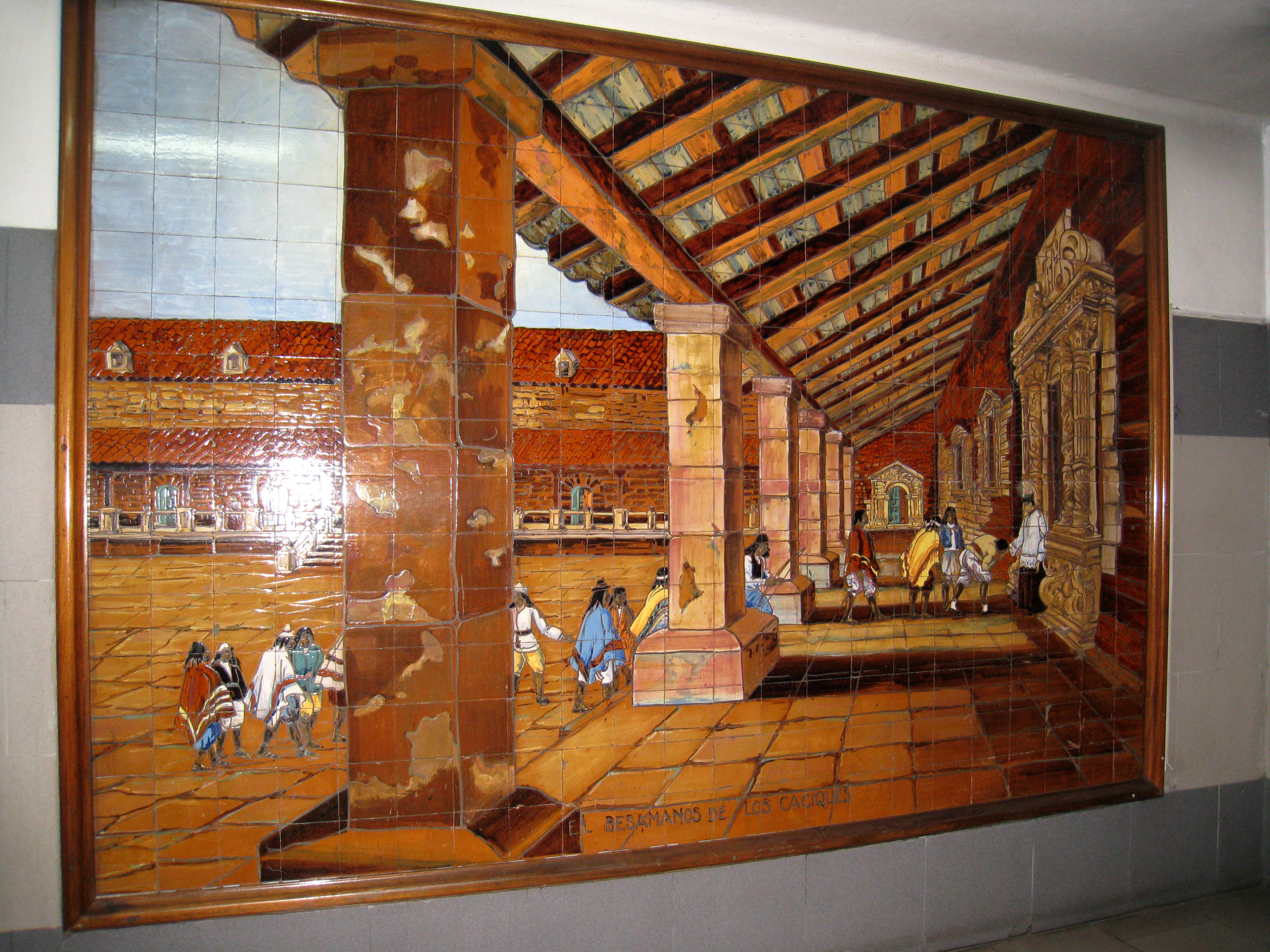

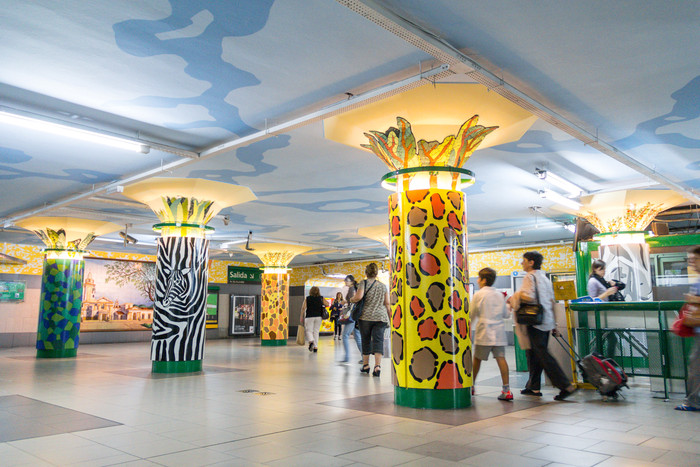

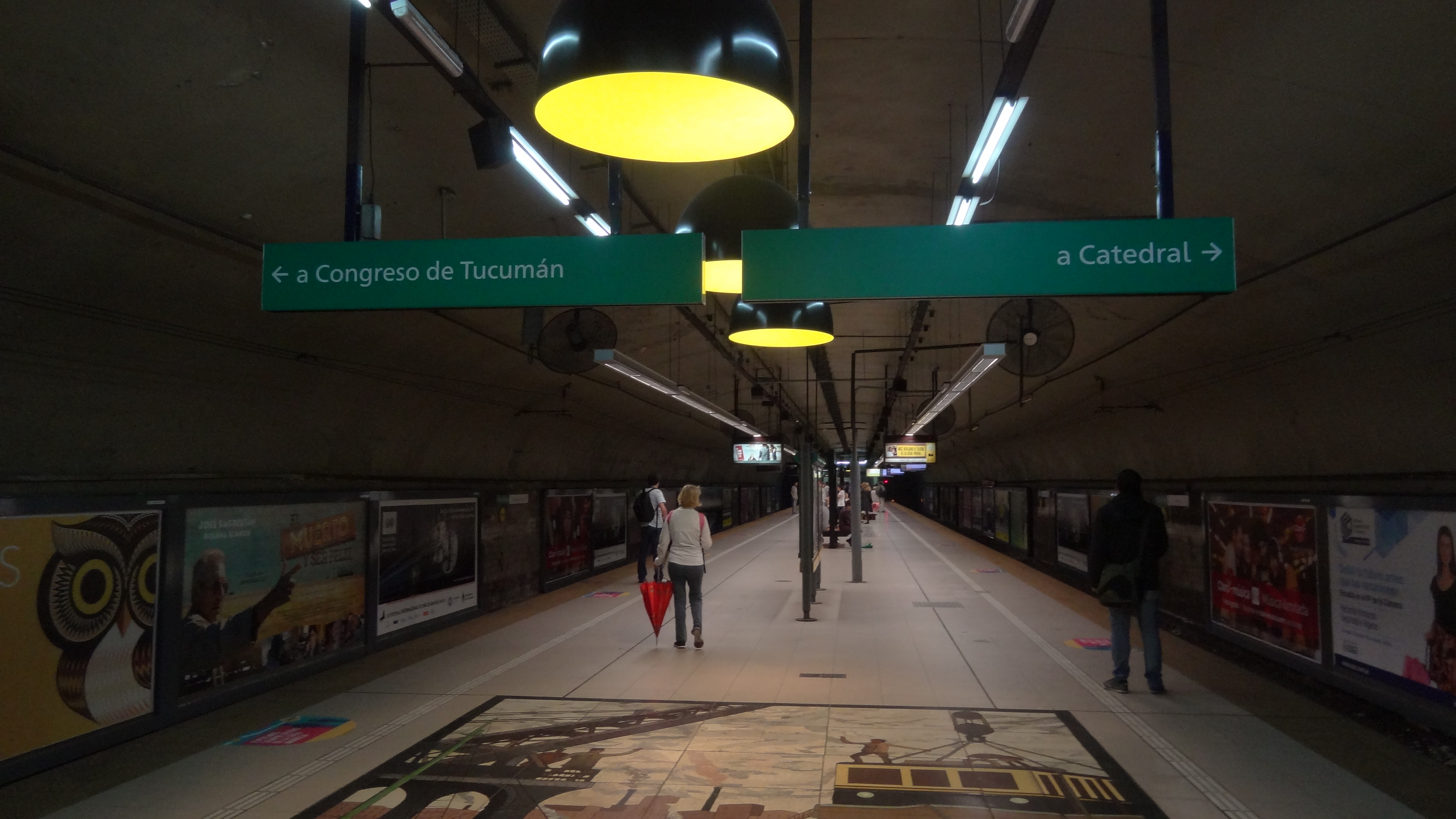

== Nearby ==
- Buenos Aires Zoo
- Buenos Aires Botanical Garden
- Monument to Giuseppe Garibaldi

== See also ==
- La Rural
