= Carlos Pellegrini (Buenos Aires Underground) =

Buenos Aires Underground station

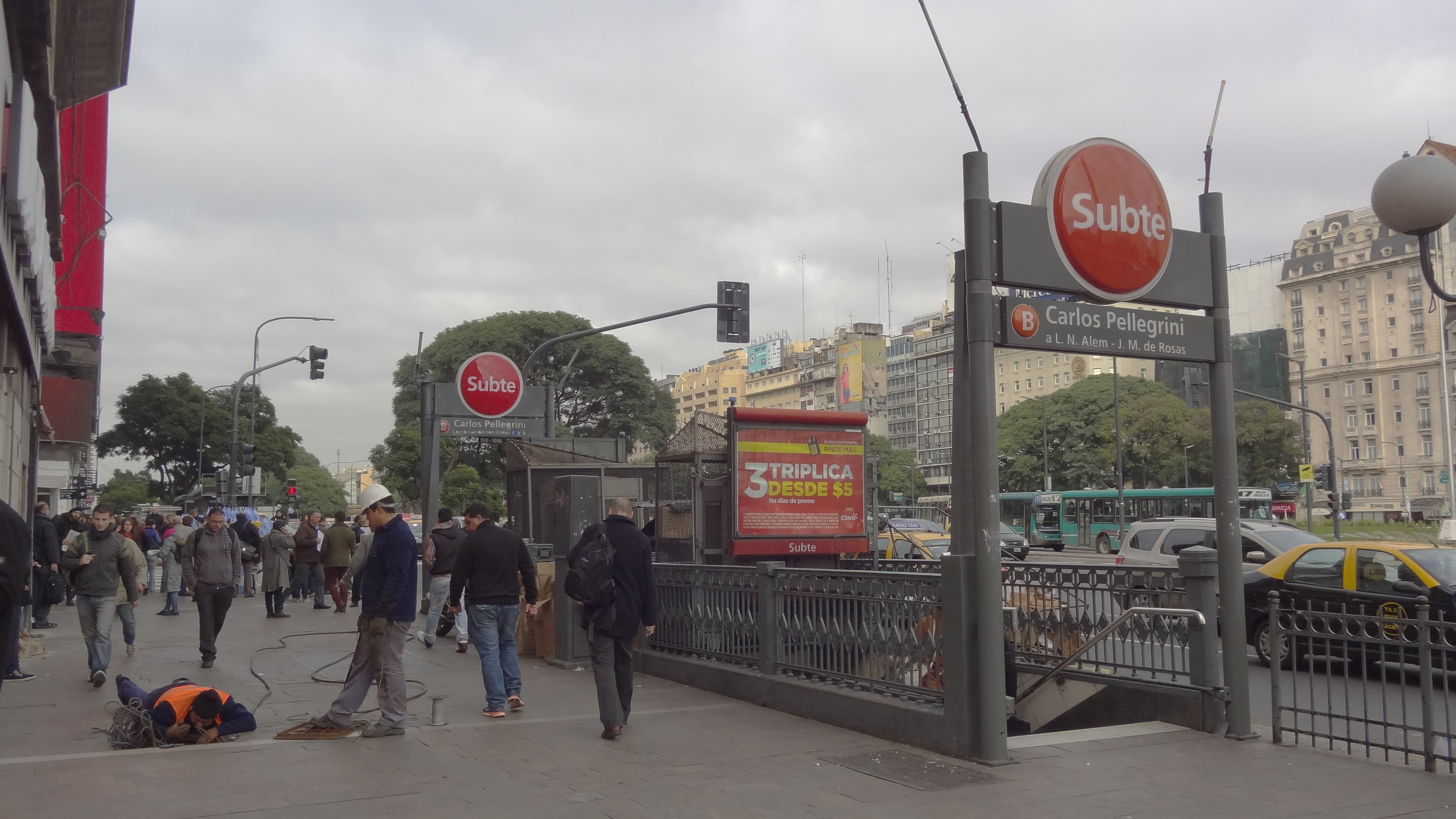

General information
- Location: Avenida Corrientes and Carlos Pellegrini
- Coordinates: 34°36′13.1″S 58°22′50.6″W
- Platforms: Island platforms

History
- Opened: 22 July 1931

Services
Preceding station	Buenos Aires Underground	Following station
Uruguay towards Juan Manuel de Rosas	Line B Transfer to: Bolívar; Transfer to: 9 de Julio	Florida towards Leandro N. Alem
Location

Carlos Pellegrini is a station on Line B of the Buenos Aires Underground. From here, passengers may transfer to the Diagonal Norte Station on Line C and the 9 de Julio Station on Line D and Metrobus 9 de Julio. The station was opened on 22 July 1931 as the eastern terminus of the extension of the line from Callao. In December 1931, the line was extended further east to Leandro N. Alem.

== Overview ==
The station is located at the intersection of Avenida Corrientes and Calle Carlos Pellegrini, and named after the latter. The station is directly underneath the Plaza de la República, home to the famous Obelisco de Buenos Aires.

== Diagonal Norte ==
Diagonal Norte is a station on Line C. From here, passengers may transfer to Carlos Pellegrini Station or 9 de Julio Station and Metrobus 9 de Julio. It is located near the Obelisco de Buenos Aires.

The station was opened on 9 November 1934 as the western terminus of the inaugural section of the line, from Constitución to Diagonal Norte. On 6 February 1936 the line was extended to Retiro.

== 9 de Julio ==
9 de Julio is a station on Line D. From here, passengers may transfer to Carlos Pellegrini station on Line B and Diagonal Norte station on Line C and Metrobus 9 de Julio.

The station was opened on 3 June 1937 as part of the inaugural section of Line D, between Catedral and Tribunales.

== Gallery ==
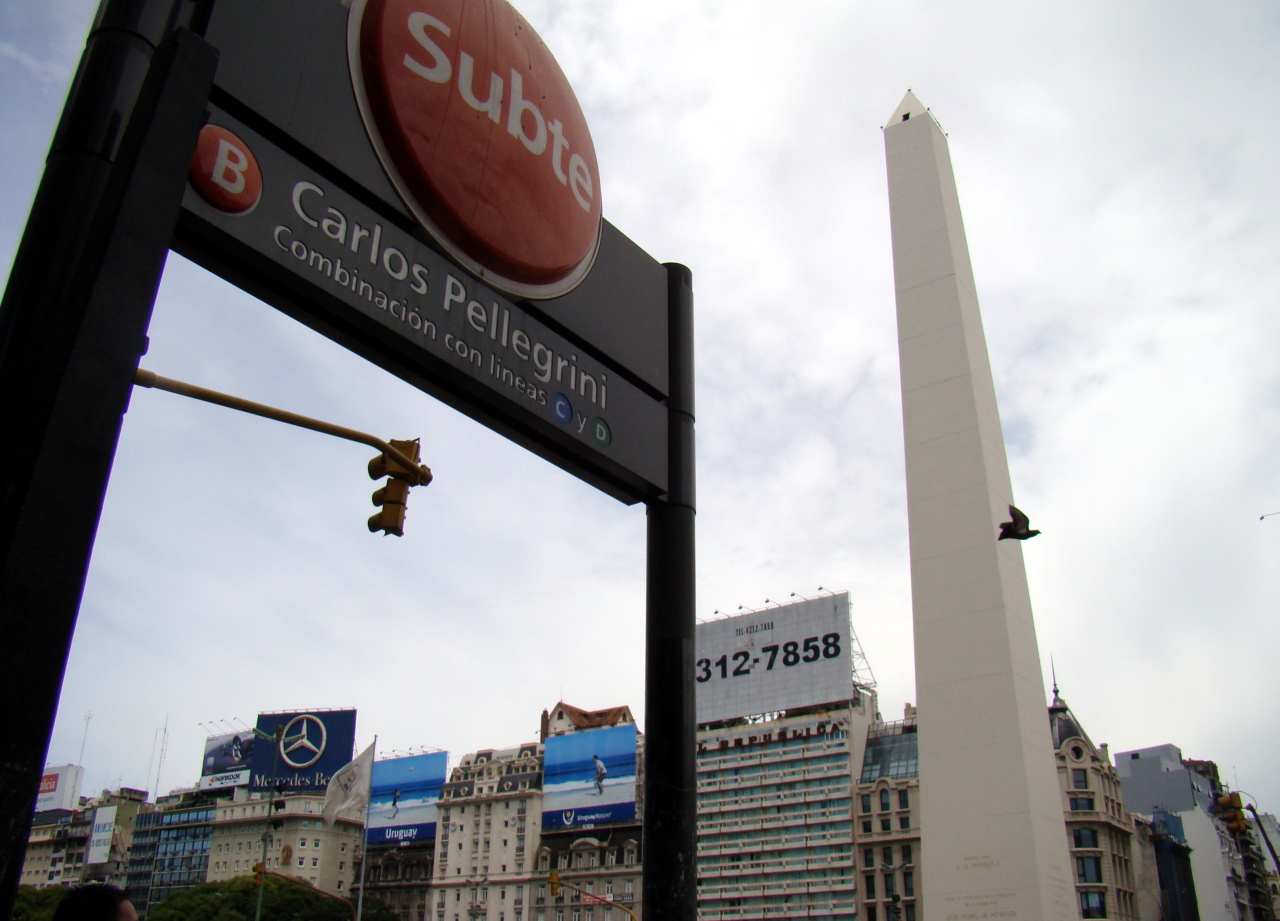
Station entrance next to the obelisk

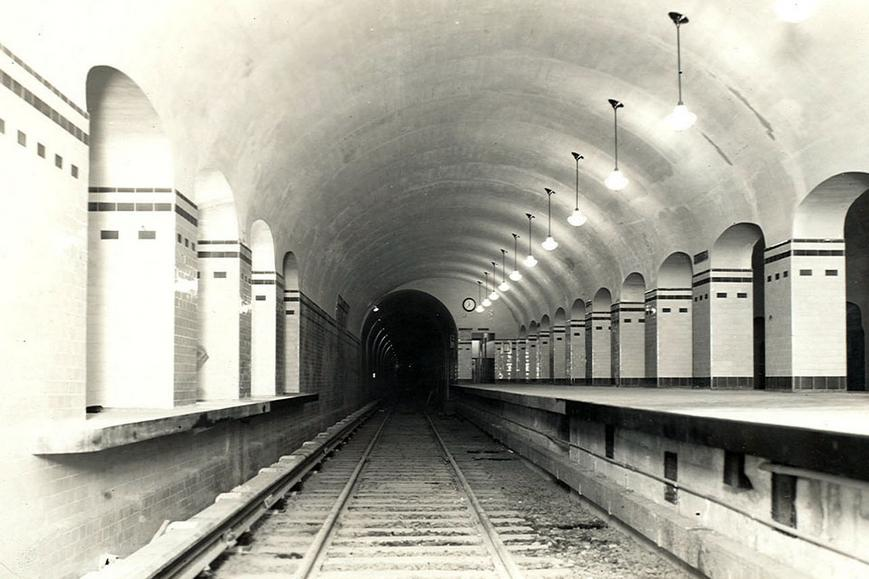
Original aspect in 1931

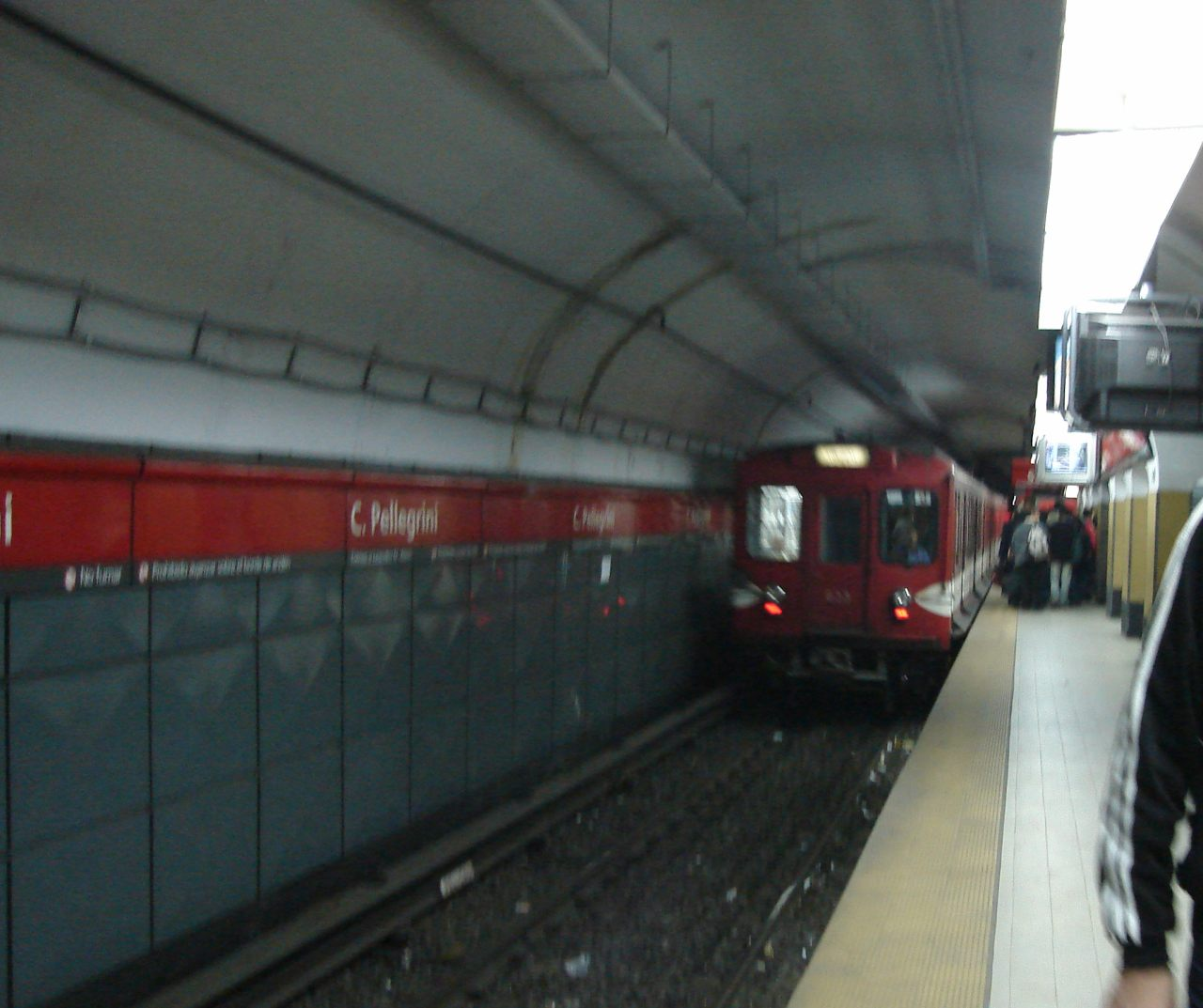
Carlos Pellegrini

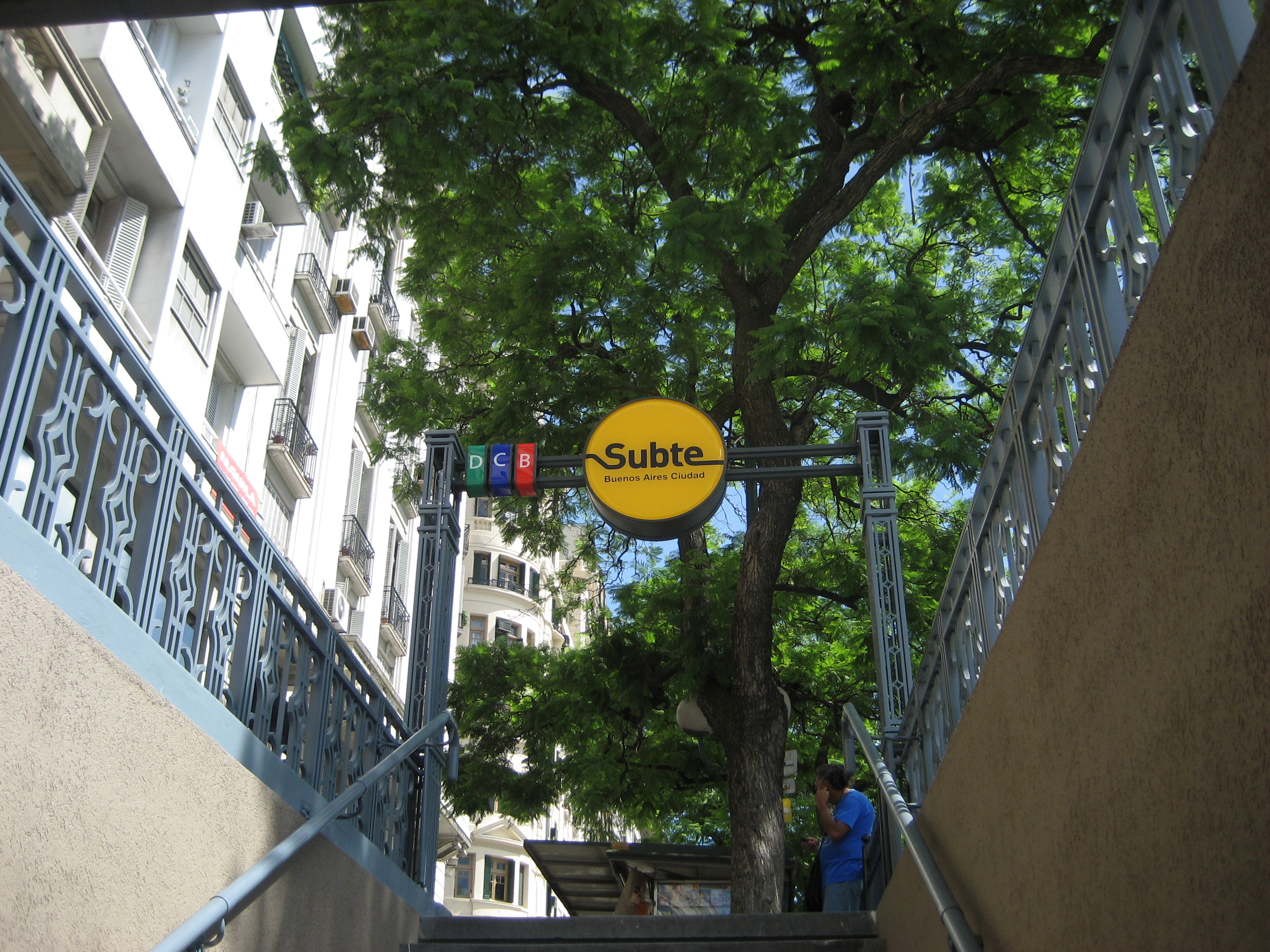
Carlos Pellegrini

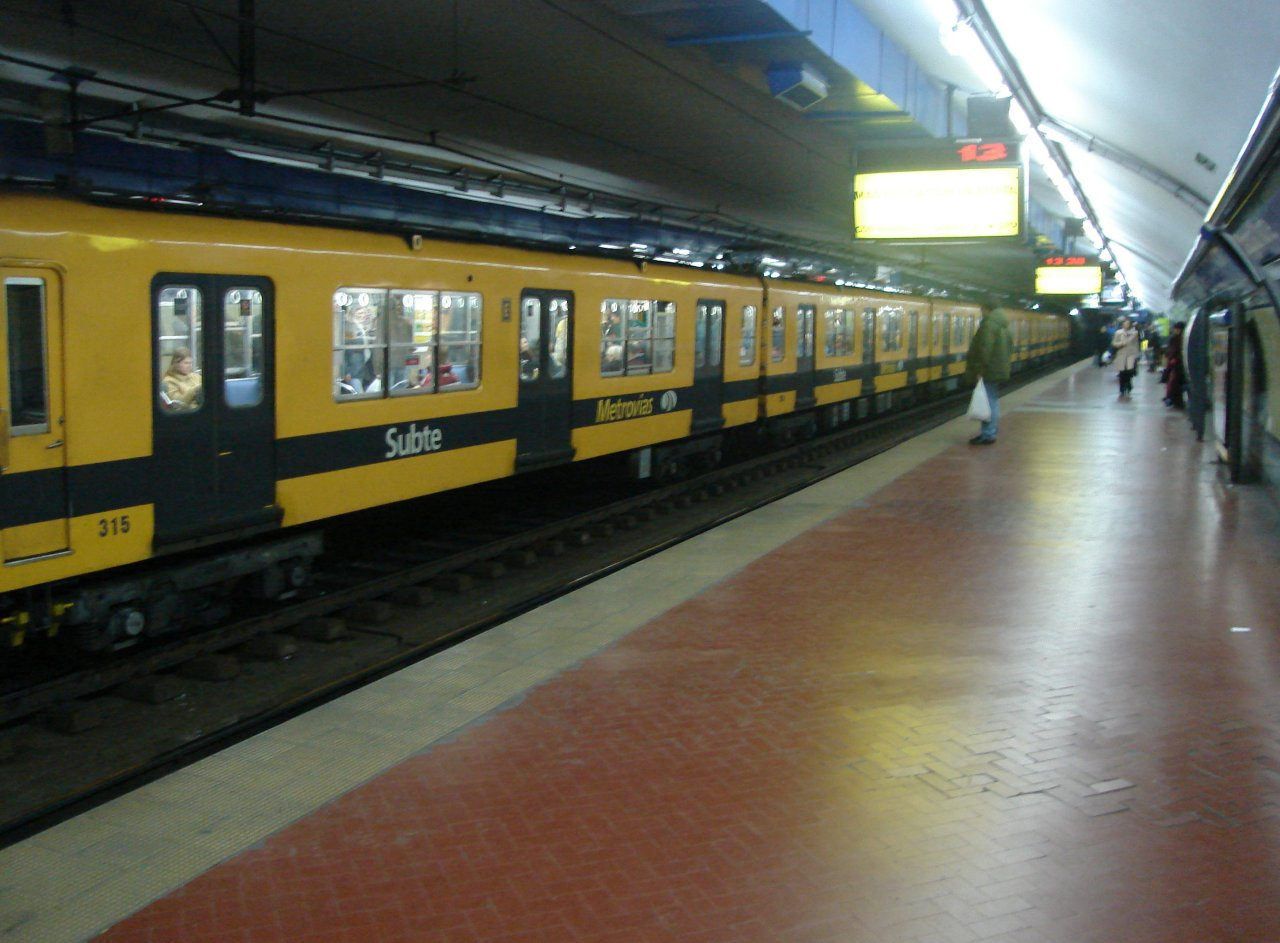
Diagonal Norte

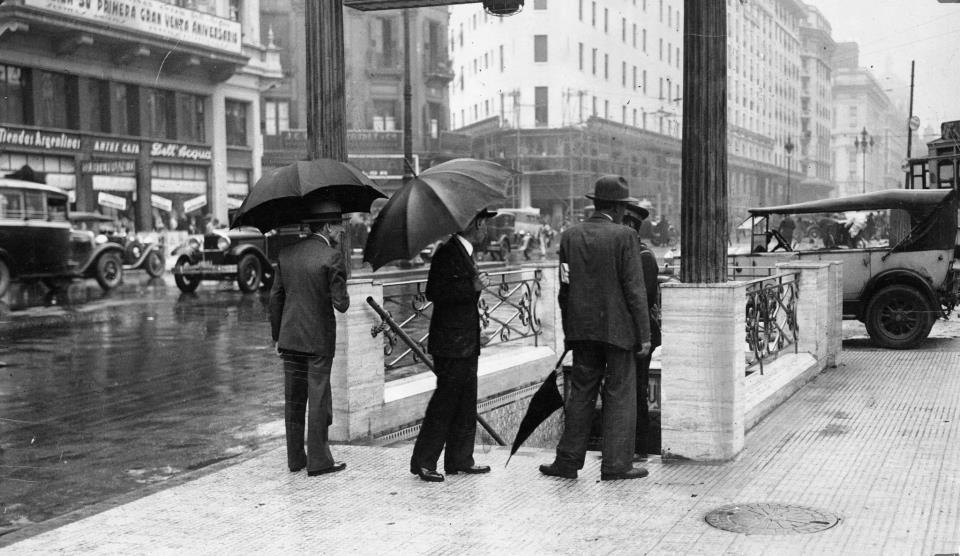
Original entrance of Diagonal Norte in 1936

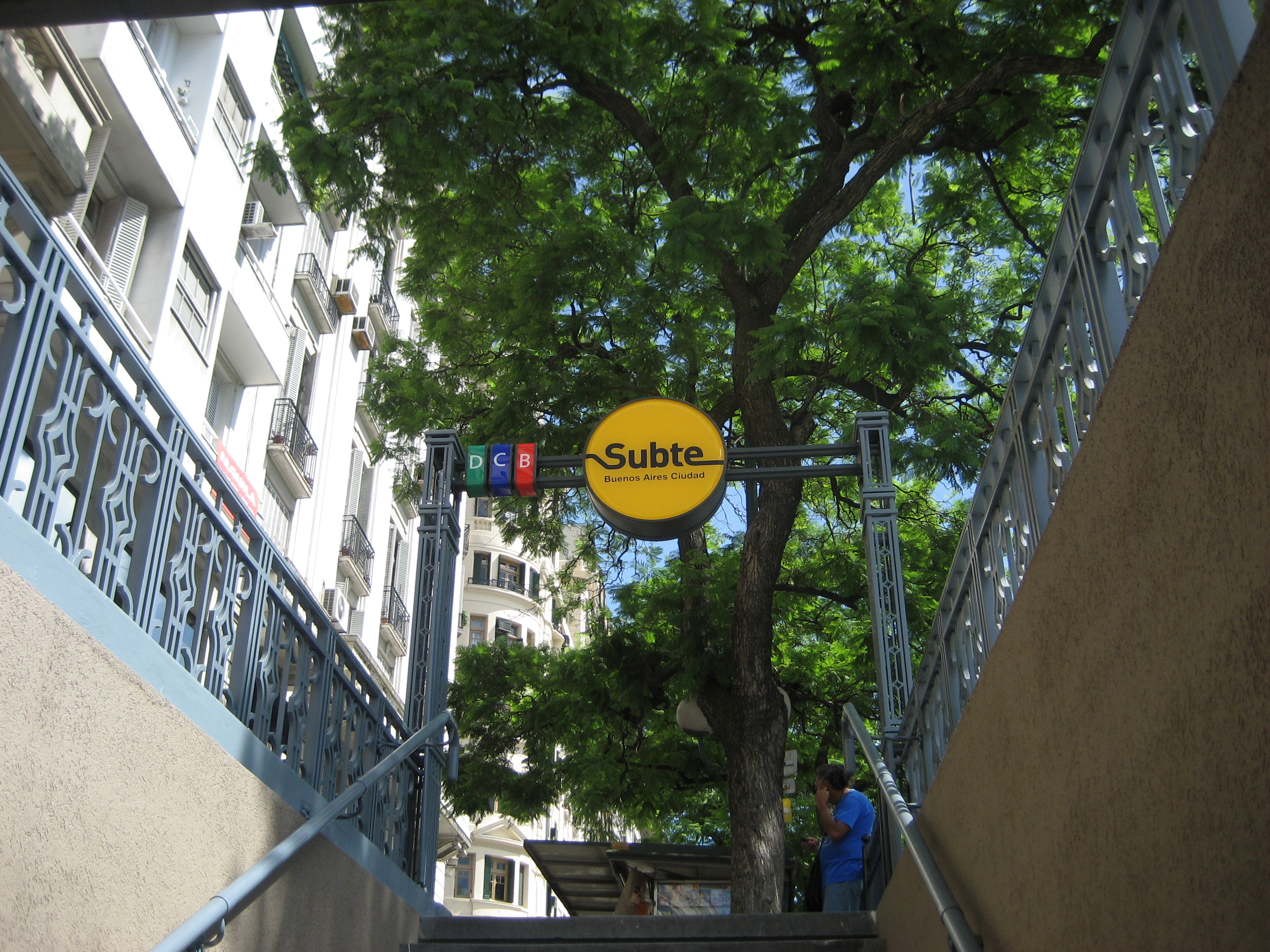
Exit from the Obelisco Gallery

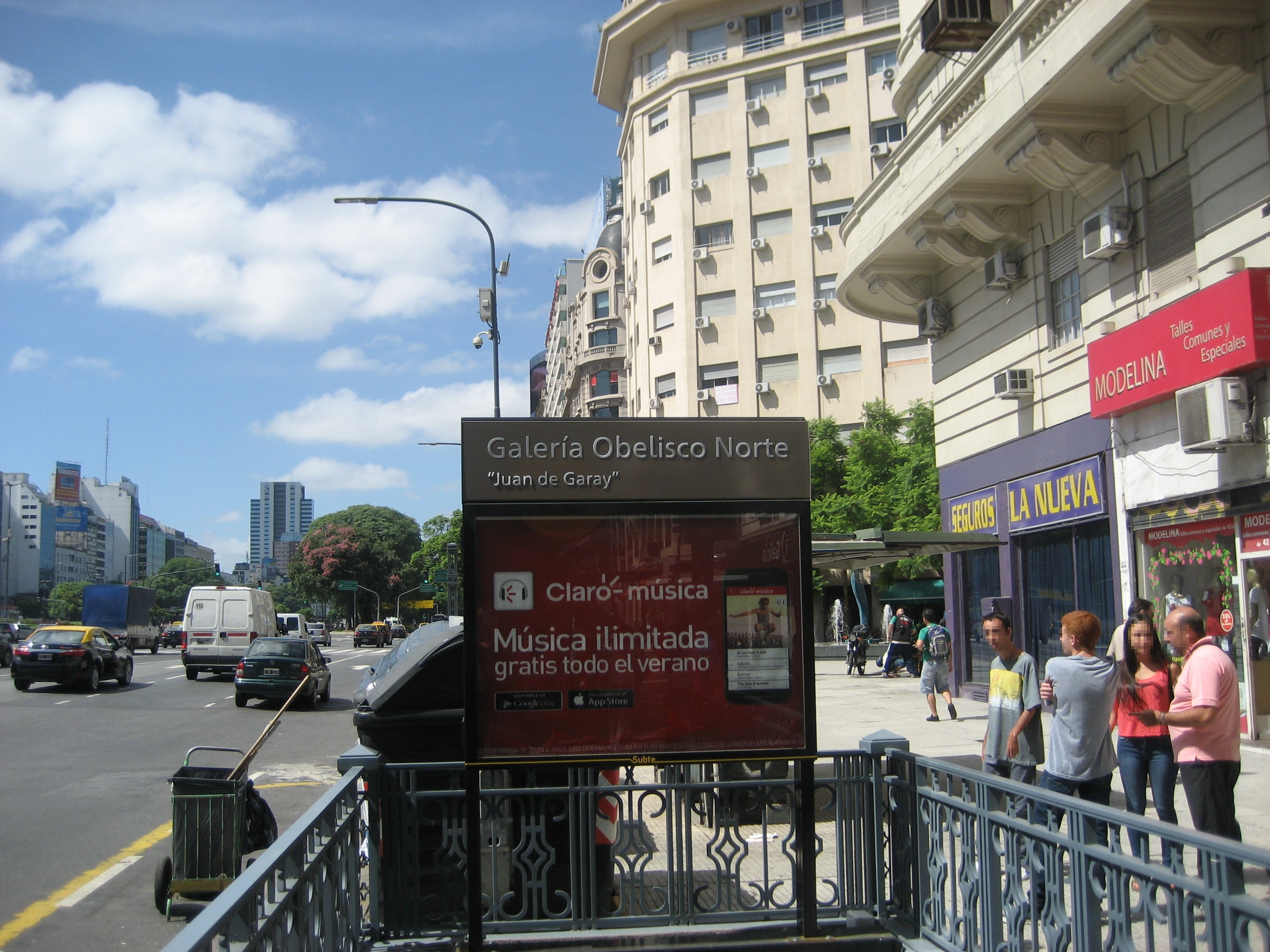
An entrance to the Obelisco Gallery

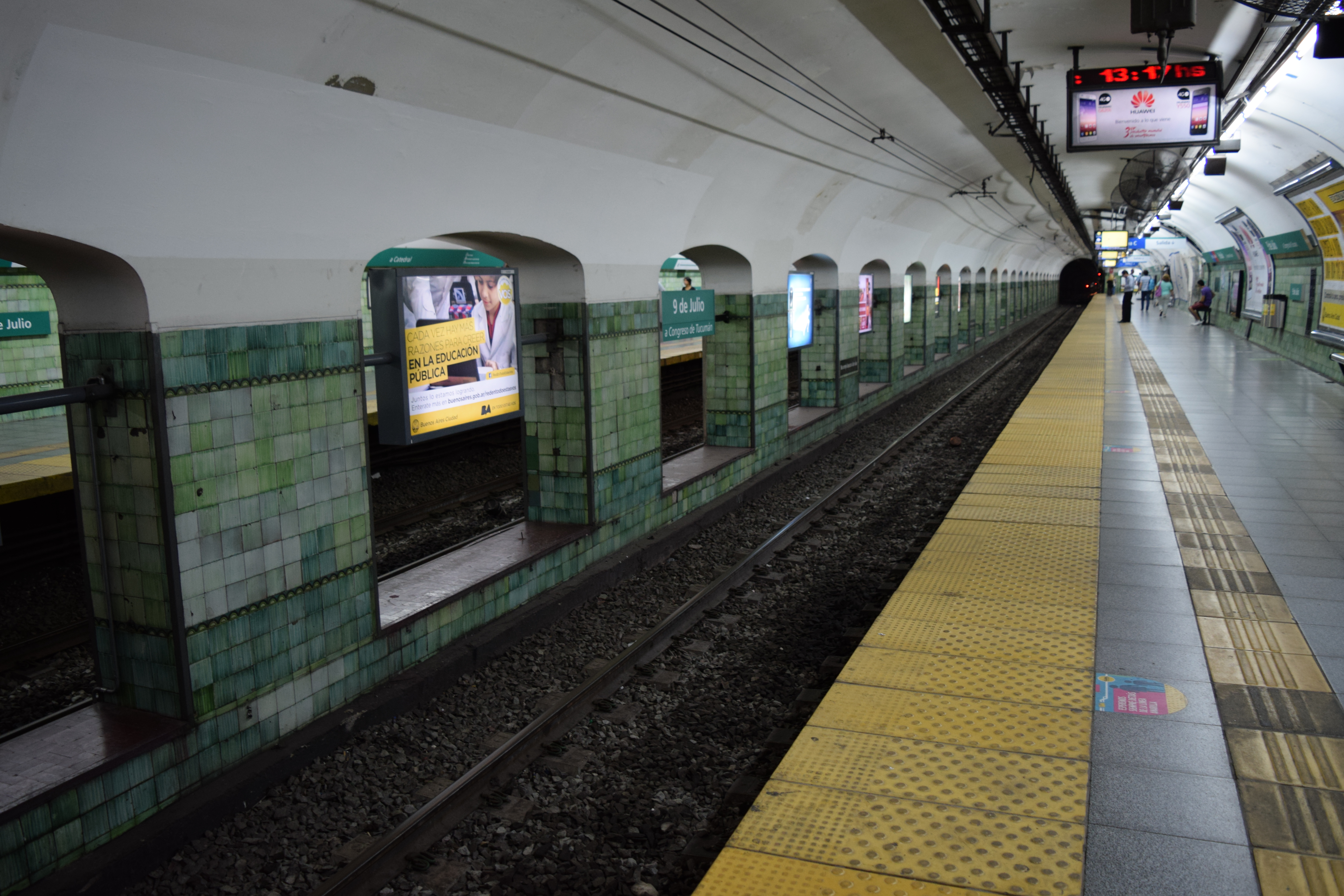
9 de Julio

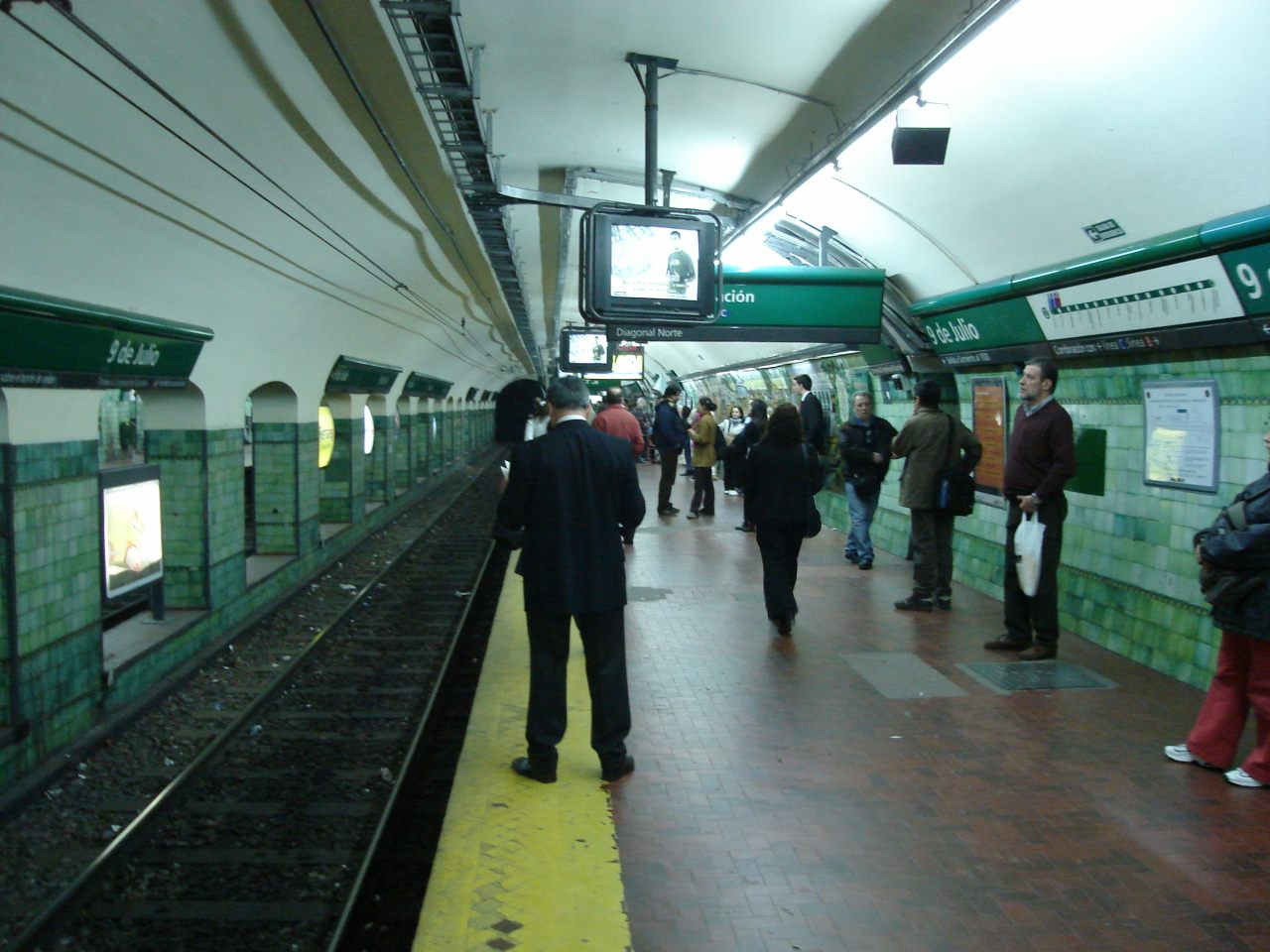
9 de Julio

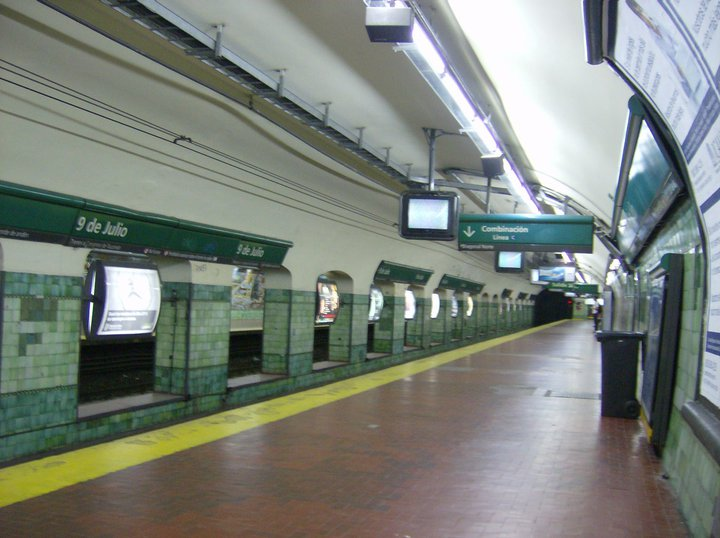
9 de Julio

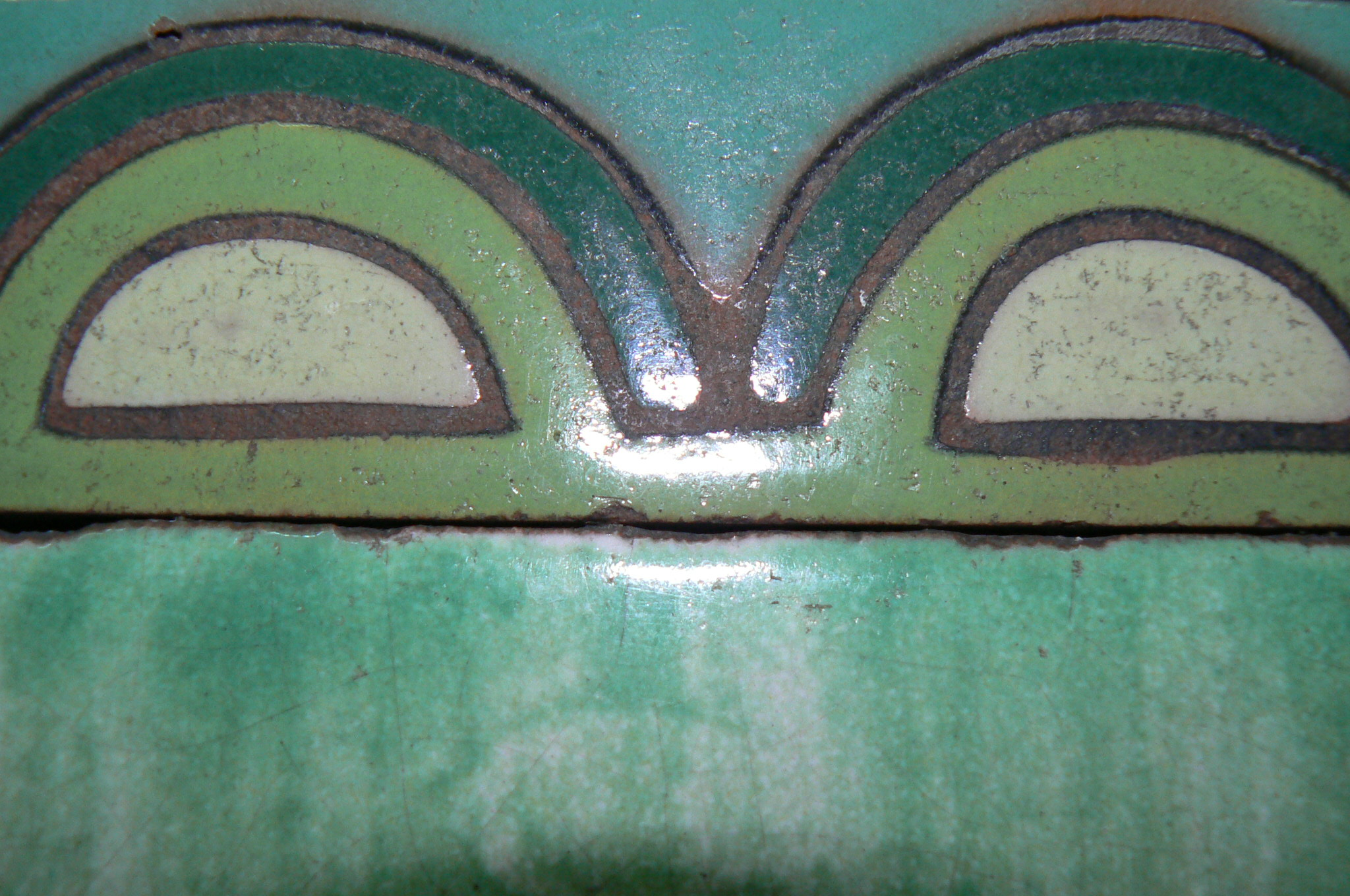
9 de Julio
