= Line I (Buenos Aires Underground) =

Future metro line in Buenos Aires

The future network as outlined in Law 670, including line I Serrano-Directorio with 10 stations

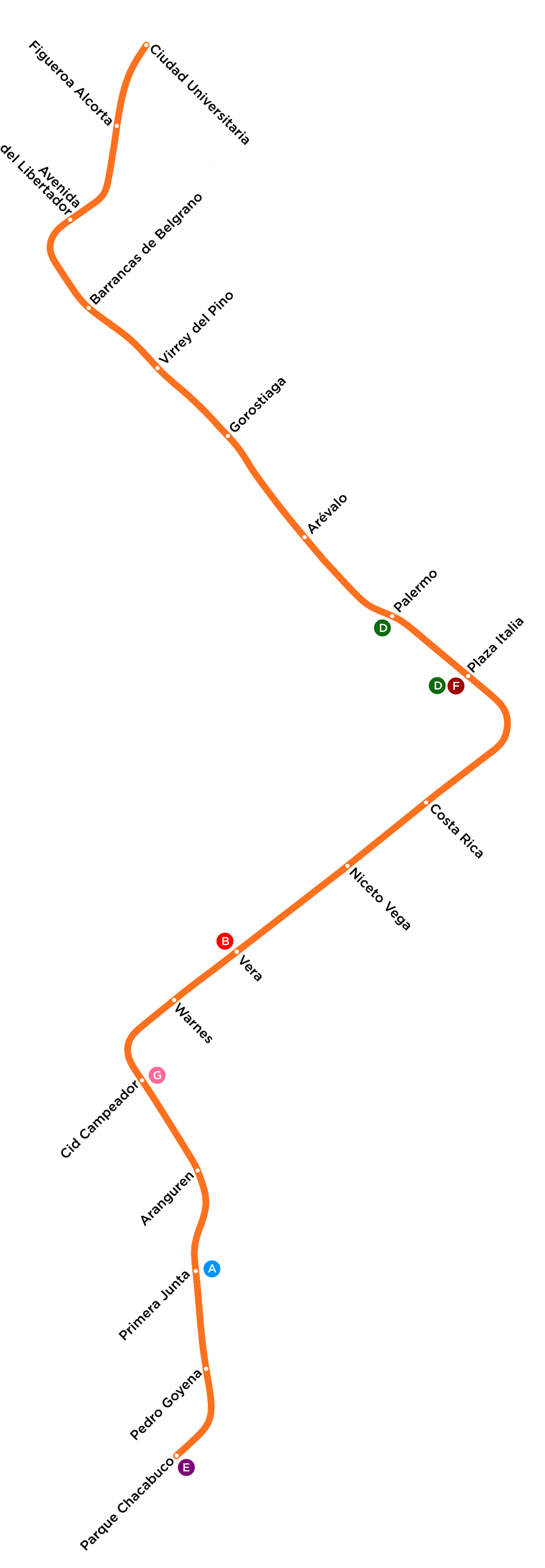
Parque Chacabuco - Ciudad Universitaria

Line I is a planned addition to the Buenos Aires Underground.

Line I will run from Parque Chacabuco ("Directorio") to Ciudad Universitaria with 18 new stations. The route length would be 12.6 km. The future of this line (which had the lowest priority in the expansion plans) is currently uncertain since it has been proposed that a Metrobus line be built instead, which would follow the same route as the proposed metro rail line.

The first phase would have a route that went from Parque Chacabuco to Plaza Italia ("Serrano"), a length of 6.6 km, and the line would have 10 stations.

== Phase 1 ==
Serrano - Directorio line is planned as follows:

- Serrano
- Costa Rica
- Córdoba
- Corrientes
- Warnes
- Díaz Vélez
- Aranguen
- Rivadavia
- Pedro Goyena
- Directorio

== Phase 2 ==
- Palermo (interchange to Line D)
- Chenaut
- Jorge Newbery
- Teodoro García
- Virrey del Pino
- Barrancas de Belgrano
