= Florida (Buenos Aires Underground) =

Buenos Aires Underground station

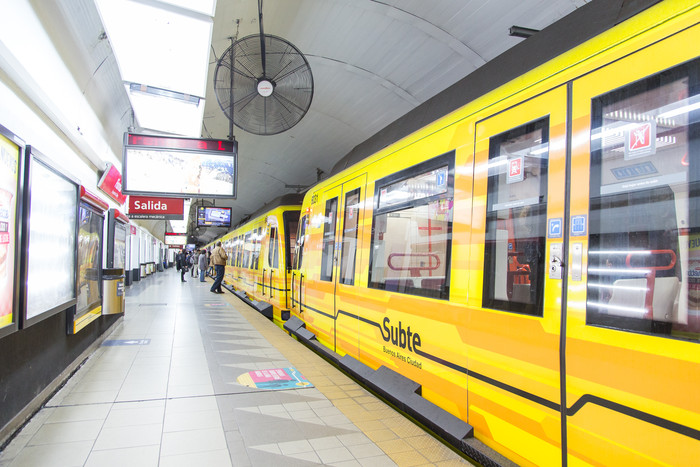

General information
- Location: Avenida Corrientes and Calle Florida
- Coordinates: 34°36′12″S 58°22′30.4″W
- Platforms: Island platforms

History
- Opened: December 1931

Services
Preceding station	Buenos Aires Underground	Following station
Carlos Pellegrini towards Juan Manuel de Rosas	Line B	Leandro N. Alem Terminus
Location

Florida is a station on Line B of the Buenos Aires Underground. The station was opened in December 1931 as part of the extension of the line from Carlos Pellegrini to Leandro N. Alem.

It is located in the San Nicolás barrio, at the intersection of Avenida Corrientes and Calle Florida, and named after the latter.
