= Pasteur - AMIA (Buenos Aires Underground) =

Buenos Aires Underground station

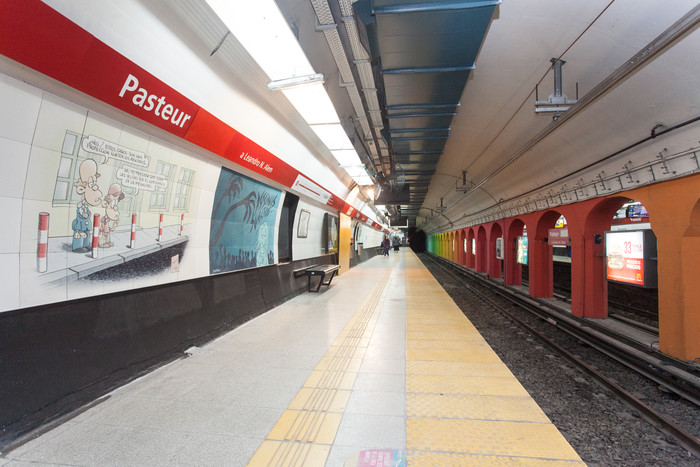

General information
- Location: Corrientes and Pasteur
- Coordinates: 34°36′16.7″S 58°23′58.1″W
- Platforms: Side platforms

History
- Opened: 17 October 1930

Services
Preceding station	Buenos Aires Underground	Following station
Pueyrredón towards Juan Manuel de Rosas	Line B	Callao towards Leandro N. Alem
Location

Pasteur - AMIA is a station on Line B of the Buenos Aires Underground. It was opened on 17 October 1930 as part of the inaugural section of the line between Federico Lacroze and Callao.

It is located in the Balvanera barrio, at the intersection of Avenida Corrientes and Calle Pasteur, and named after the latter. In 2015, murals and monuments commemorating the 1994 AMIA bombing (which took place nearby) were set up in the station, while proposals were put forward to change the name of the station to Pasteur - AMIA. This was approved in July 2015, and the station was renamed.

== Gallery ==
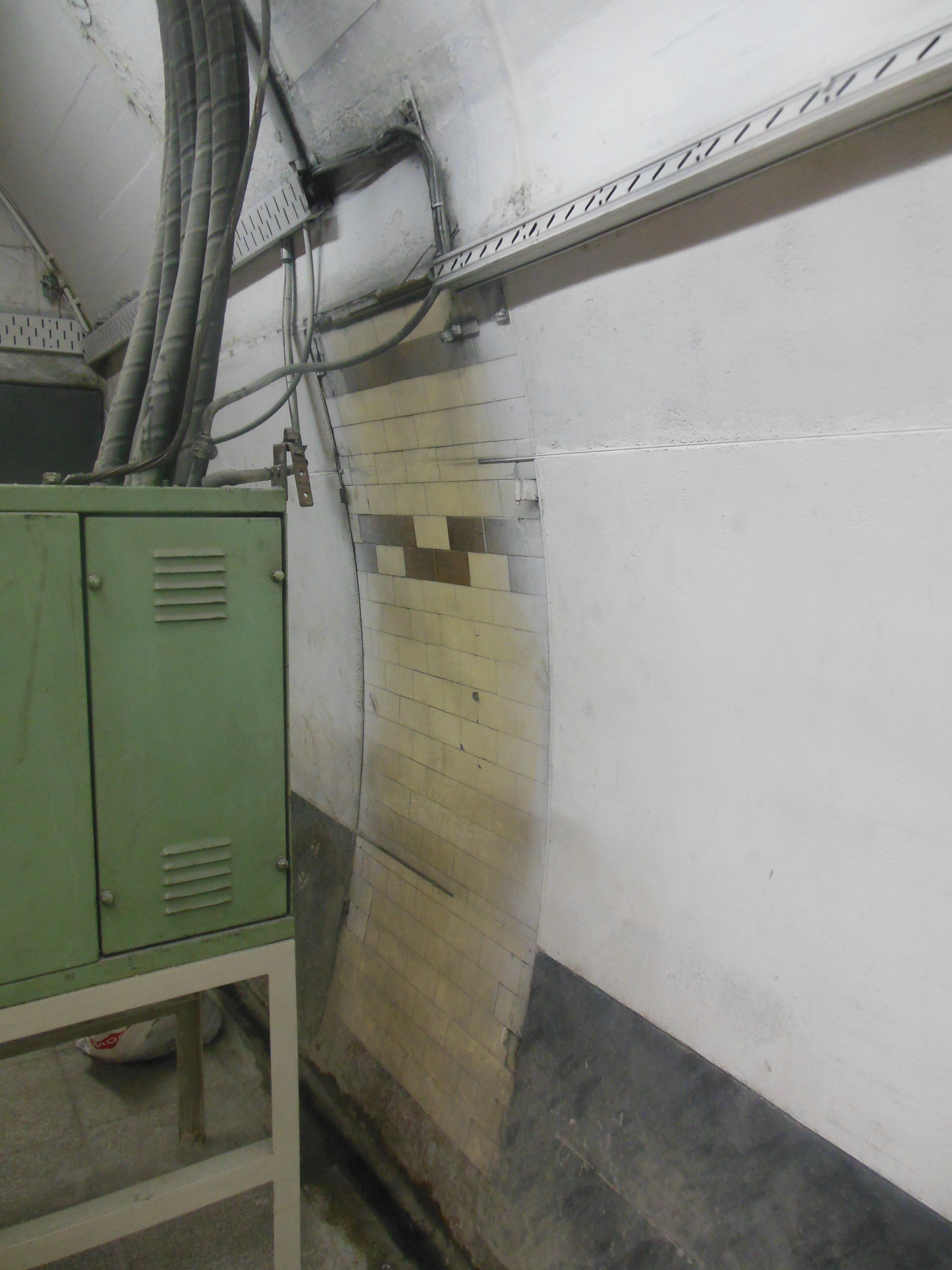
The original masonry still remains behind the paint

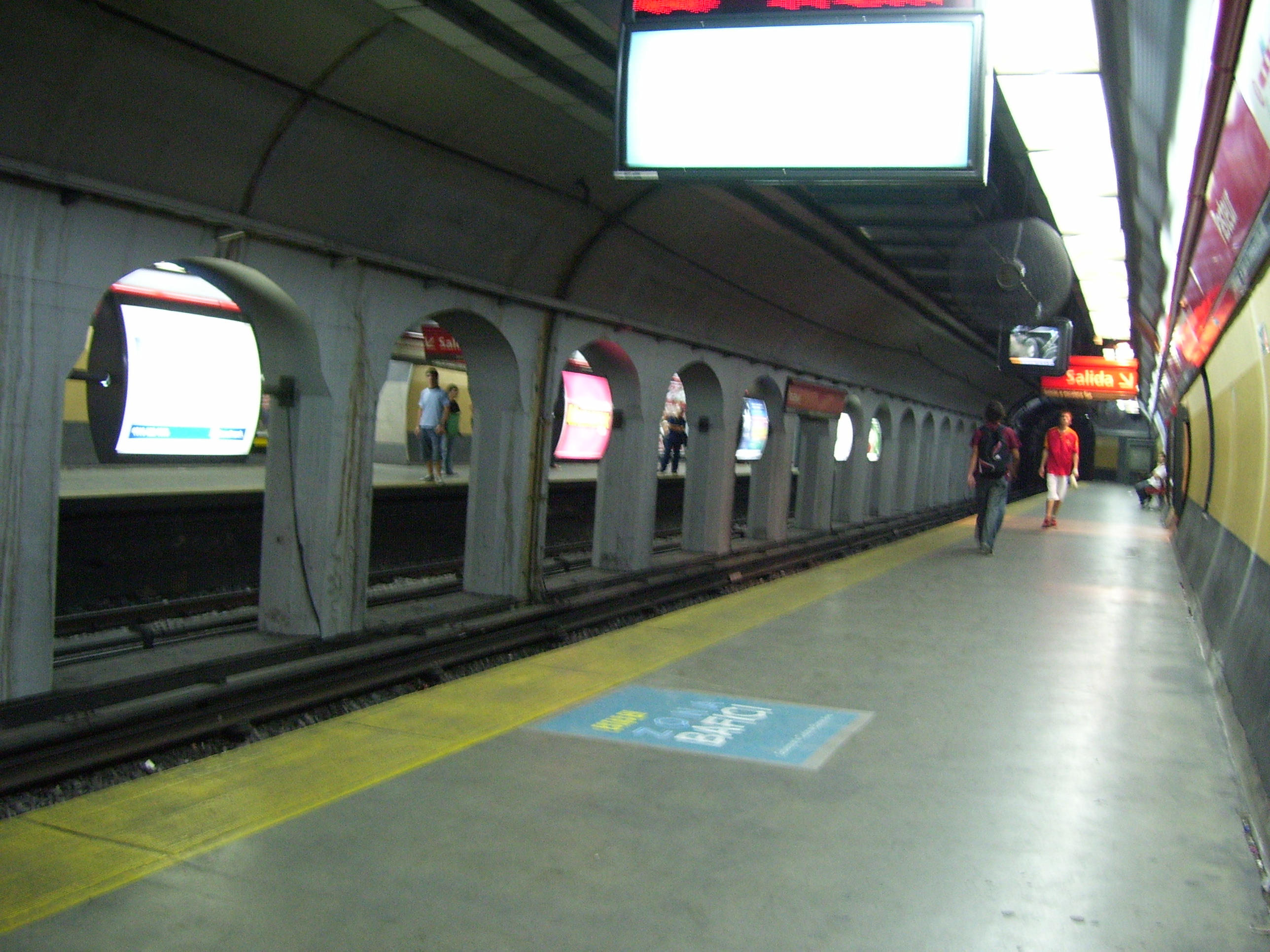
The station as it was in 2008 before refurbishment

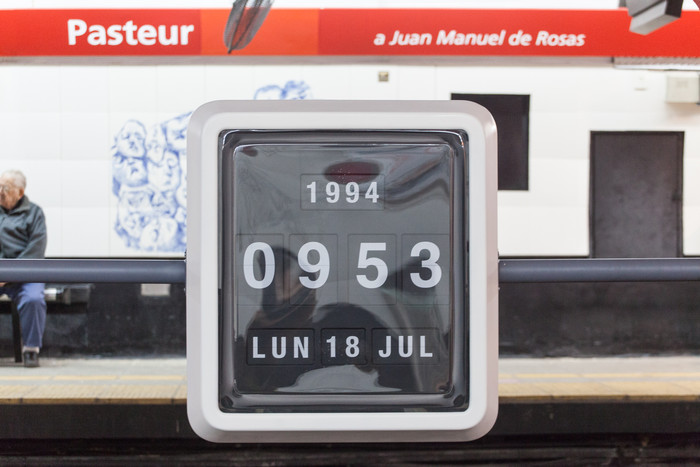
Memorial to the 1994 AMIA bombing

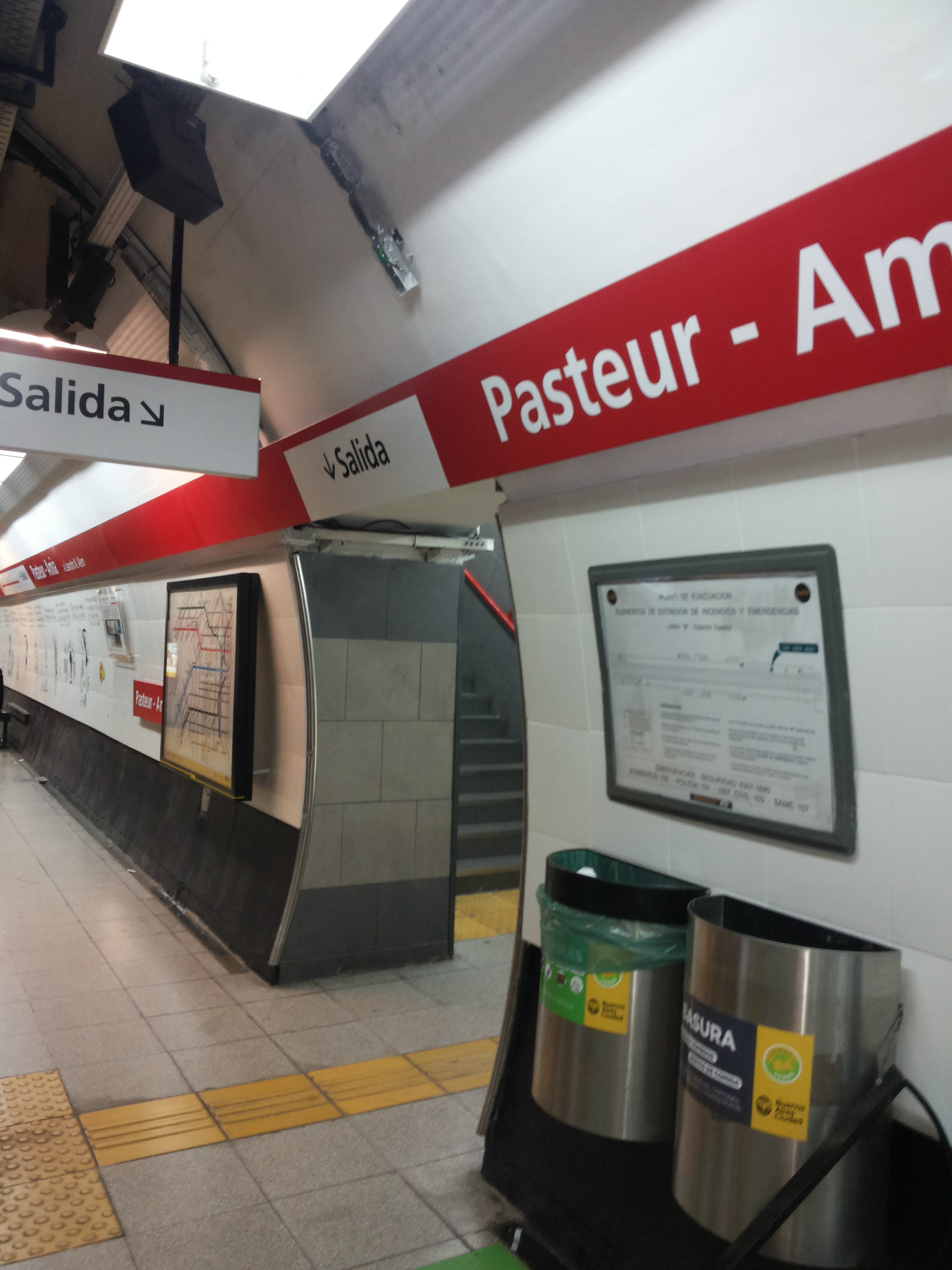
New signage
