= Plaza Italia, Buenos Aires =

Square in Buenos Aires, Argentina

Coordinates: 34.581372°S 58.420967°W

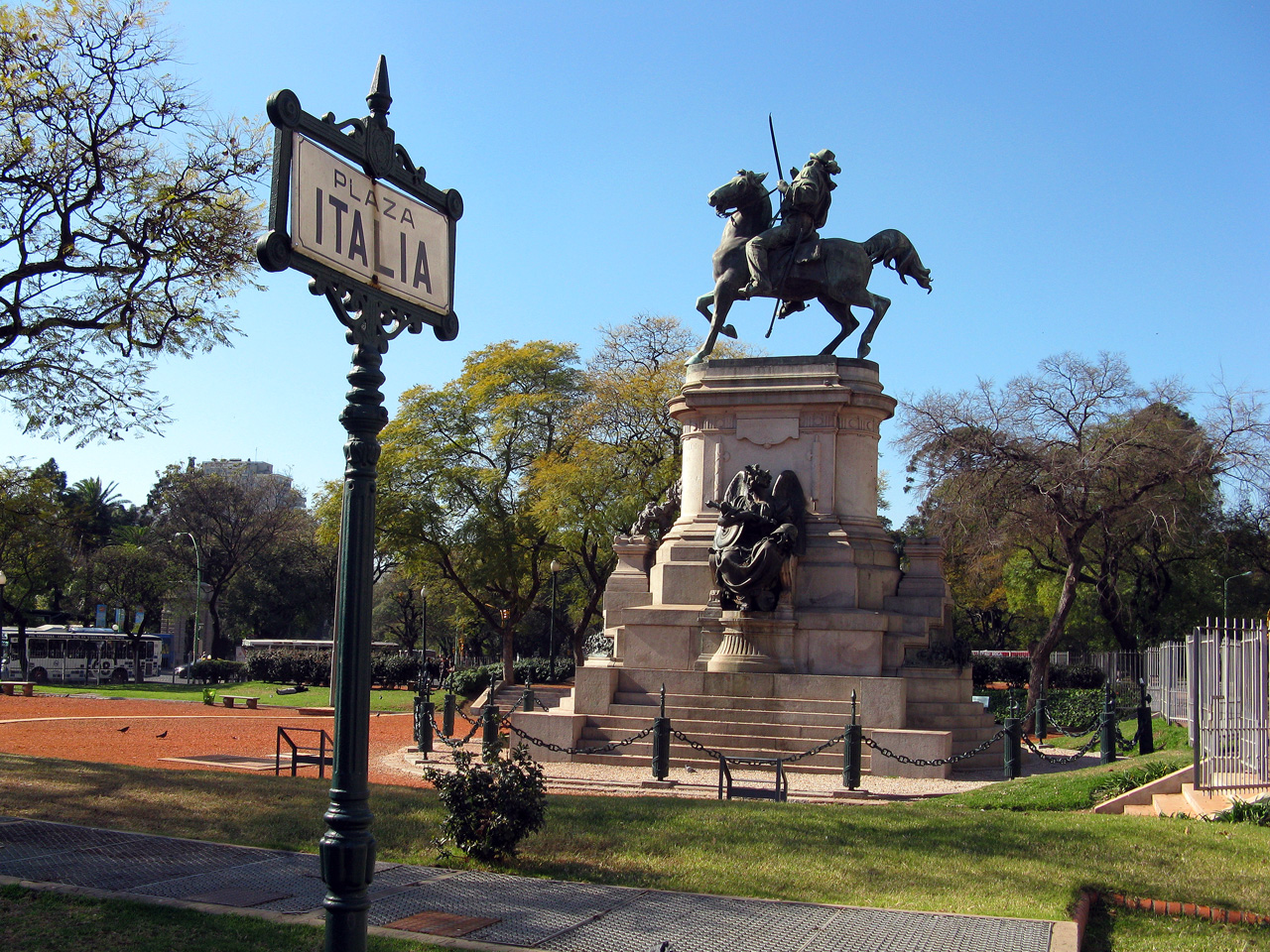
Plaza Italia, in Palermo, Buenos Aires.

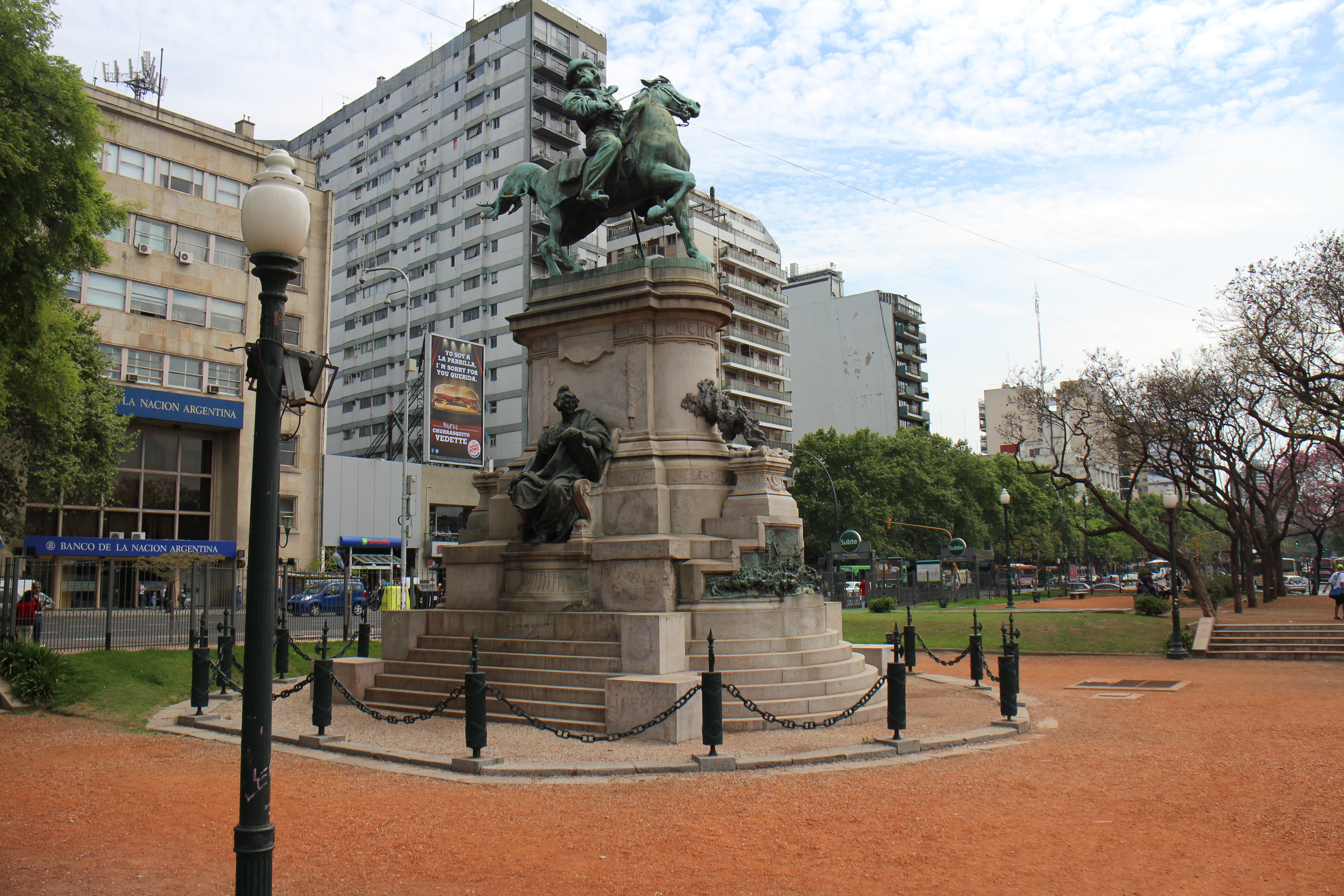
Monument to Giuseppe Garibaldi, in Plaza Italia.

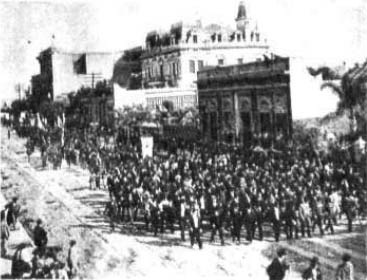
Cornerstone ceremony for the monument in 1898.

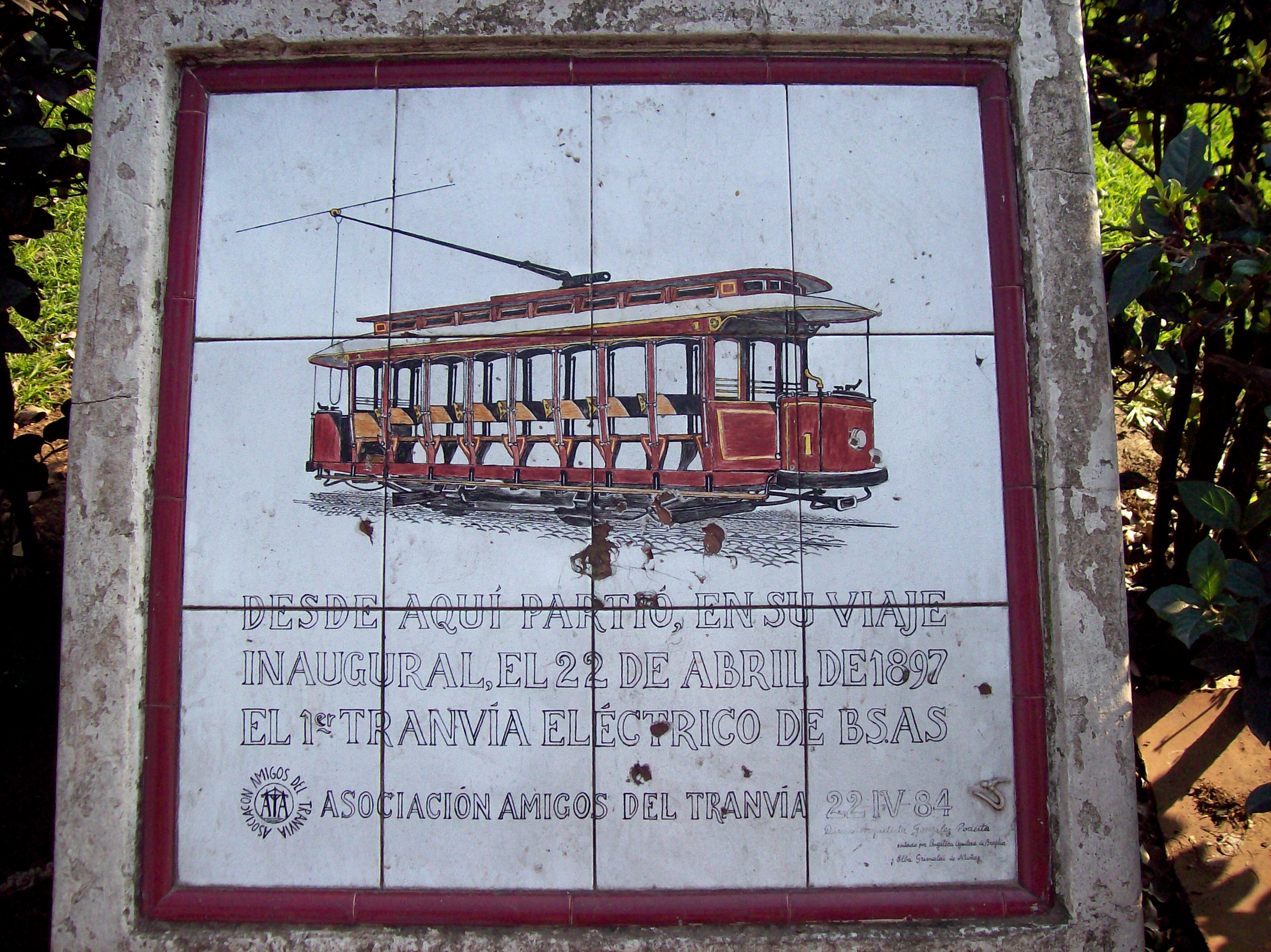
Mosaic celebrating the start of the first electric tram of the city.

Plaza Italia is a small park in the city of Buenos Aires in the barrio of Palermo on the confluence of Santa Fe Avenue and Avenida Sarmiento. Next to the plaza are the main entrances to the Zoo and the Botanical Gardens, and the la Rural Expo Center. The area is very busy with traffic, as it is a public transportation hub for the city.

In the center of the park there is an equestrian statue to Giuseppe Garibaldi, which opened on 19 June 1904 in a ceremony attended by Presidents Julio Argentino Roca and Bartolomé Mitre.

Under the park there is a metro station of the same name in the "D" line of the system.

On the corner of the Plaza and the Exposition Center there is a Roman column, original from the Roman Forum, donated by the city of Rome. More than 2,000 years old, it is one of the oldest monument in the city.

== History ==
The park construction works were started in 1898. Before that the area was called Plaza de los Portones (Plaza of the Big Gates), due to the big gates existing at the entrance to present-day Sarmiento Avenue. The name was changed by city ordinance in 1909 to the present name.

The first electric tram in Buenos Aires departed from Plaza Italia in 1894. This is commemorated in a small mosaic placed on the northeast side on Santa Fe Avenue.

== See also ==
- Plaza Italia (Buenos Aires Metro)
- Buenos Aires Zoo
- Buenos Aires Botanical Garden
- La Rural
- Monument to Giuseppe Garibaldi
