= Callao (Line B Buenos Aires Underground) =

Buenos Aires Underground station

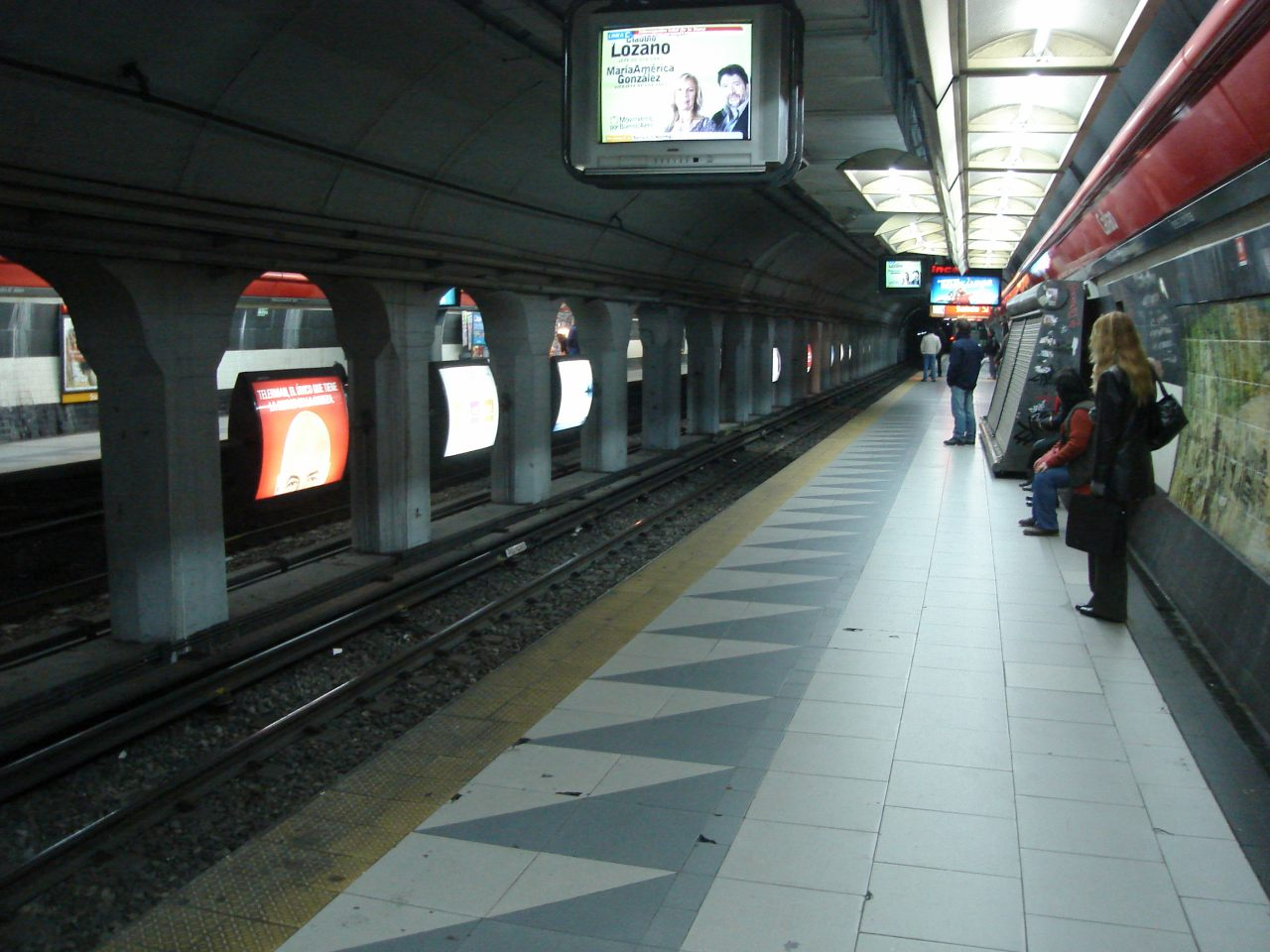

General information
- Location: Corrientes and Callao
- Coordinates: 34°36′16″S 58°23′32.1″W
- Platforms: Side platforms

History
- Opened: 17 October 1930

Services
Preceding station	Buenos Aires Underground	Following station
Pasteur - AMIA towards Juan Manuel de Rosas	Line B	Uruguay towards Leandro N. Alem
Location

Callao is a station on Line B of the Buenos Aires Underground. The station was opened on 17 October 1930 as the eastern terminus of the inaugural section of the line between Federico Lacroze and Callao. On 22 July 1931, the line was extended to Carlos Pellegrini.

It is located in the Balvanera barrio, at the intersection of Avenida Corrientes and Avenida Callao, and named after the latter.
