= Monument to Giuseppe Garibaldi (Buenos Aires) =

Monument

Coordinates: 34.5814°S 58.4209°W

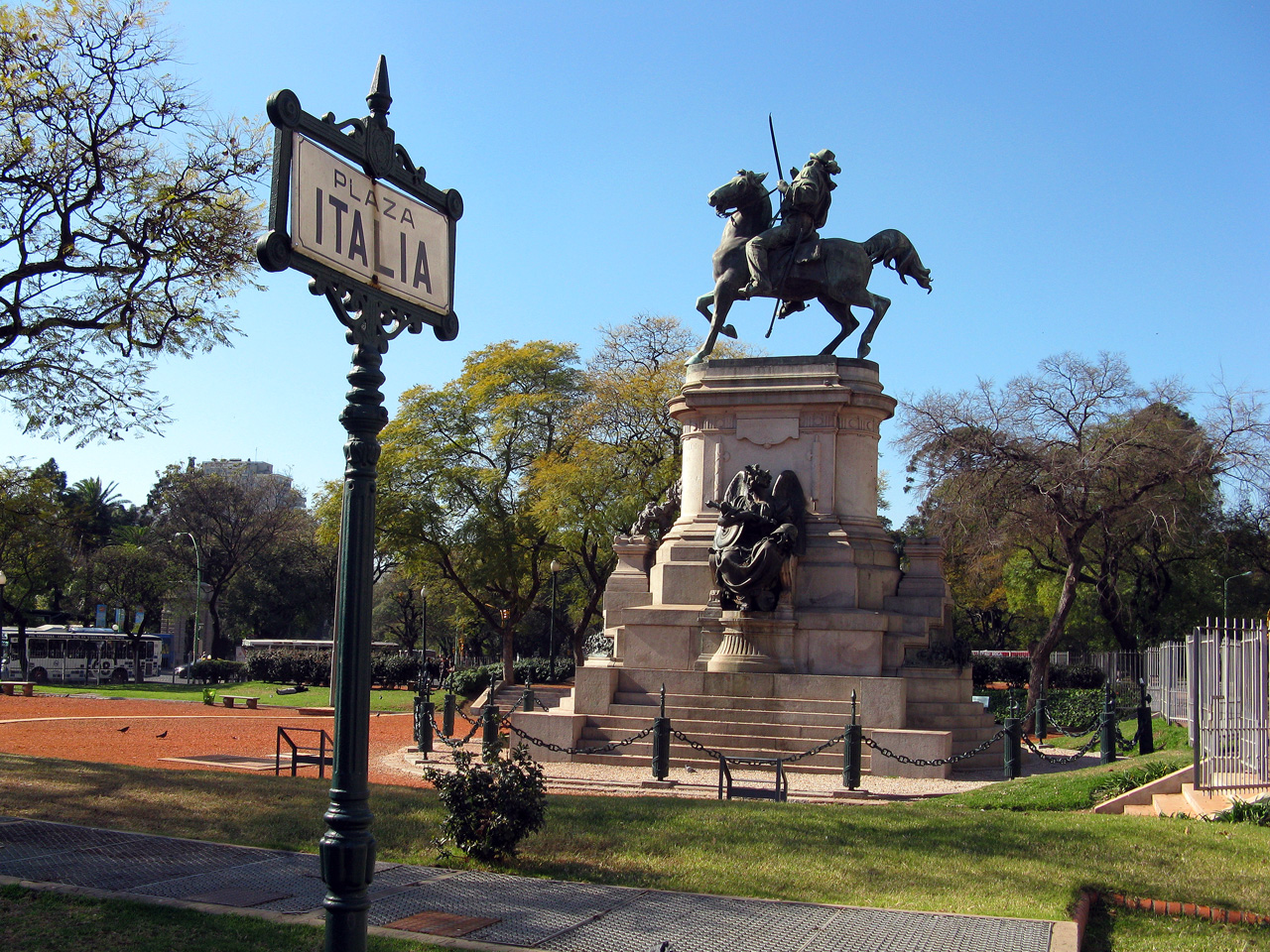
Monumento a Giuseppe Garibaldi in Plaza Italia

The Monumento a Giuseppe Garibaldi is an equestrian sculpture featuring Giuseppe Garibaldi, located on Plaza Italia, a landmark in the Palermo neighbourhood of Buenos Aires, Argentina.

Giuseppe Garibaldi (1807–1882) was an Italian military and political figure. In his twenties, he joined the Carbonari Italian patriot revolutionaries, and had to flee Italy after a failed insurrection. He then led the Italian Legion in the Uruguayan Civil War, and afterwards returned to Italy as a commander in the conflicts of the Risorgimento. He has been dubbed the "Hero of the Two Worlds" in tribute to his military expeditions in both South America and Europe.

Donated to the city by Italian residents, it was built by Italian sculptor Eugenio Maccagnani as a replica of the one located in Brescia, Italy, and was inaugurated on June 19, 1904.

== Gallery ==
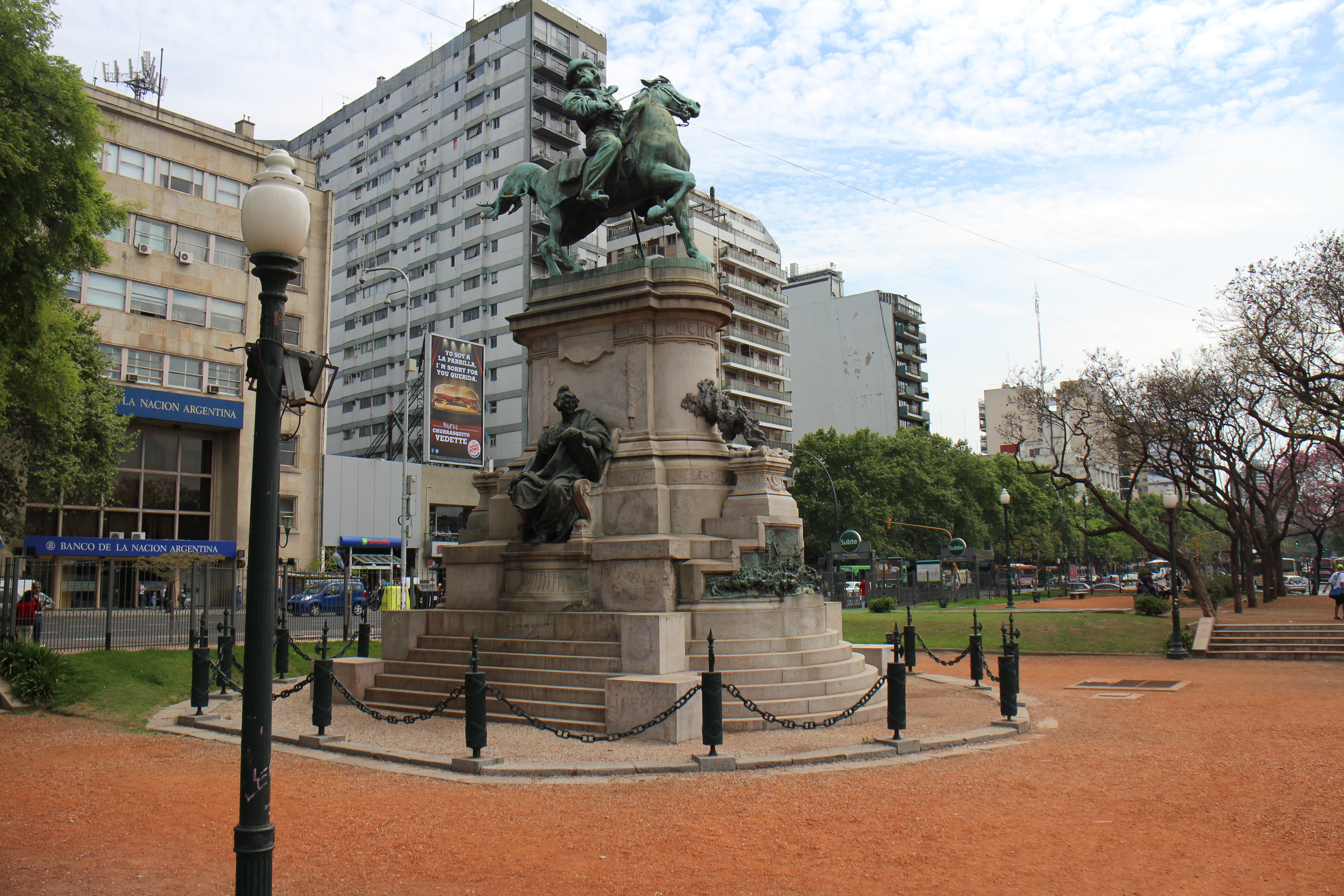

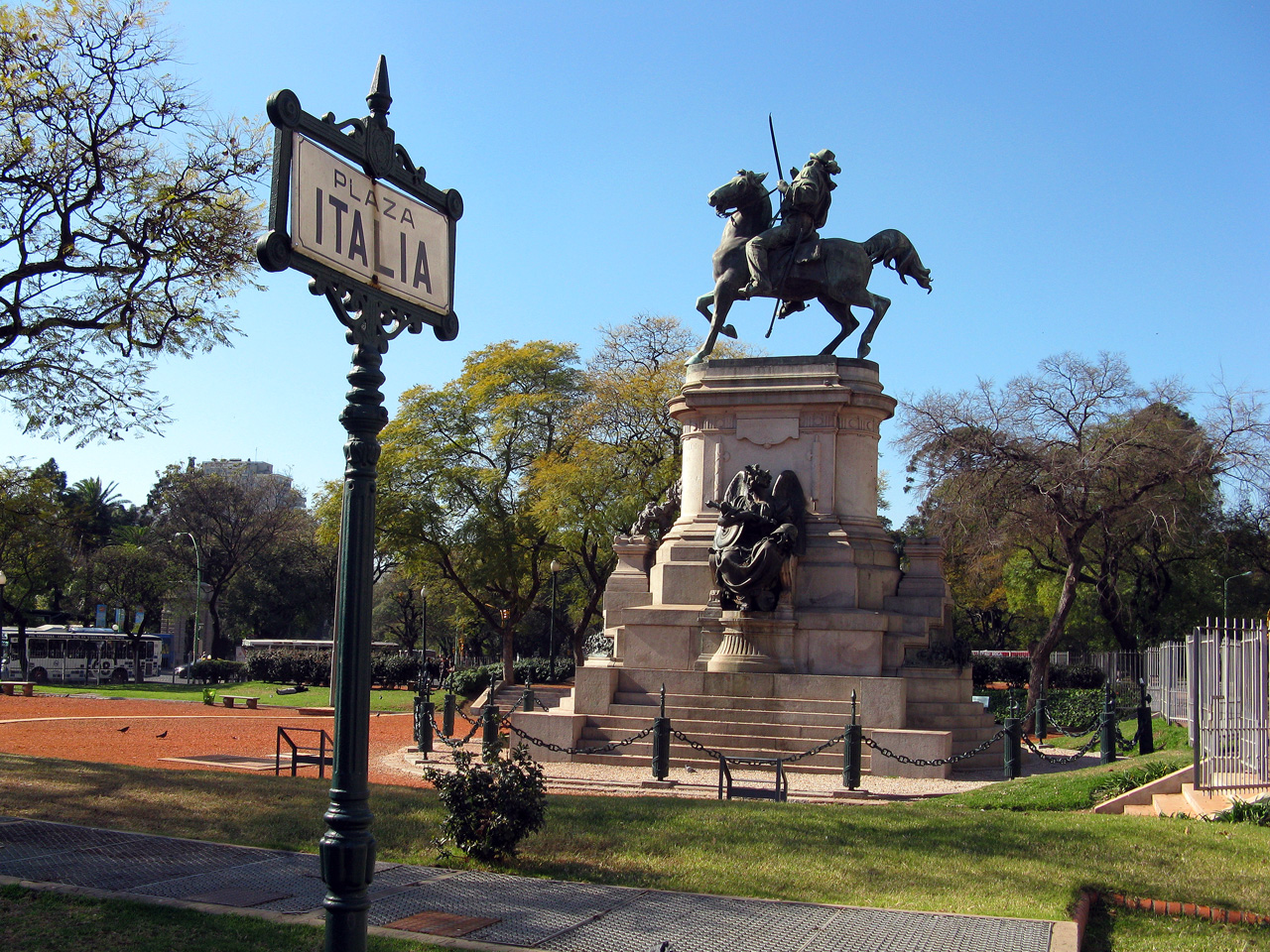

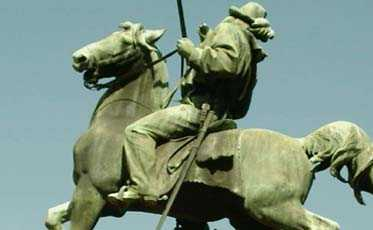
