= Tribunales (Buenos Aires Underground) =

Buenos Aires Underground station

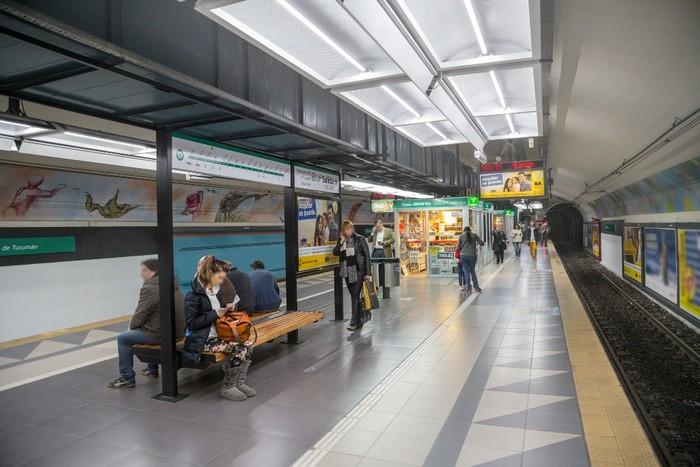

General information
- Location: Lavalle, Talcahuano, Tucumán and Libertad
- Coordinates: 34°36′7.5″S 58°23′2.6″W
- Platforms: Island platforms

History
- Opened: 3 June 1937

Services
Preceding station	Buenos Aires Underground	Following station
Callao towards Congreso de Tucumán	Line D	9 de Julio towards Catedral
Location

Tribunales is a station on Line D of the Buenos Aires Underground.

== Overview ==
The station was opened on 3 June 1937 as the western terminus of the inaugural section of Line D, from Catedral to Tribunales. It was named in honor of Palace of Justice, the most important tribunal of the city. On 23 February 1940 the line was extended to Palermo.

In 1997 the station was declared a national historic monument
