= Uruguay (Buenos Aires Underground) =

Buenos Aires Underground station

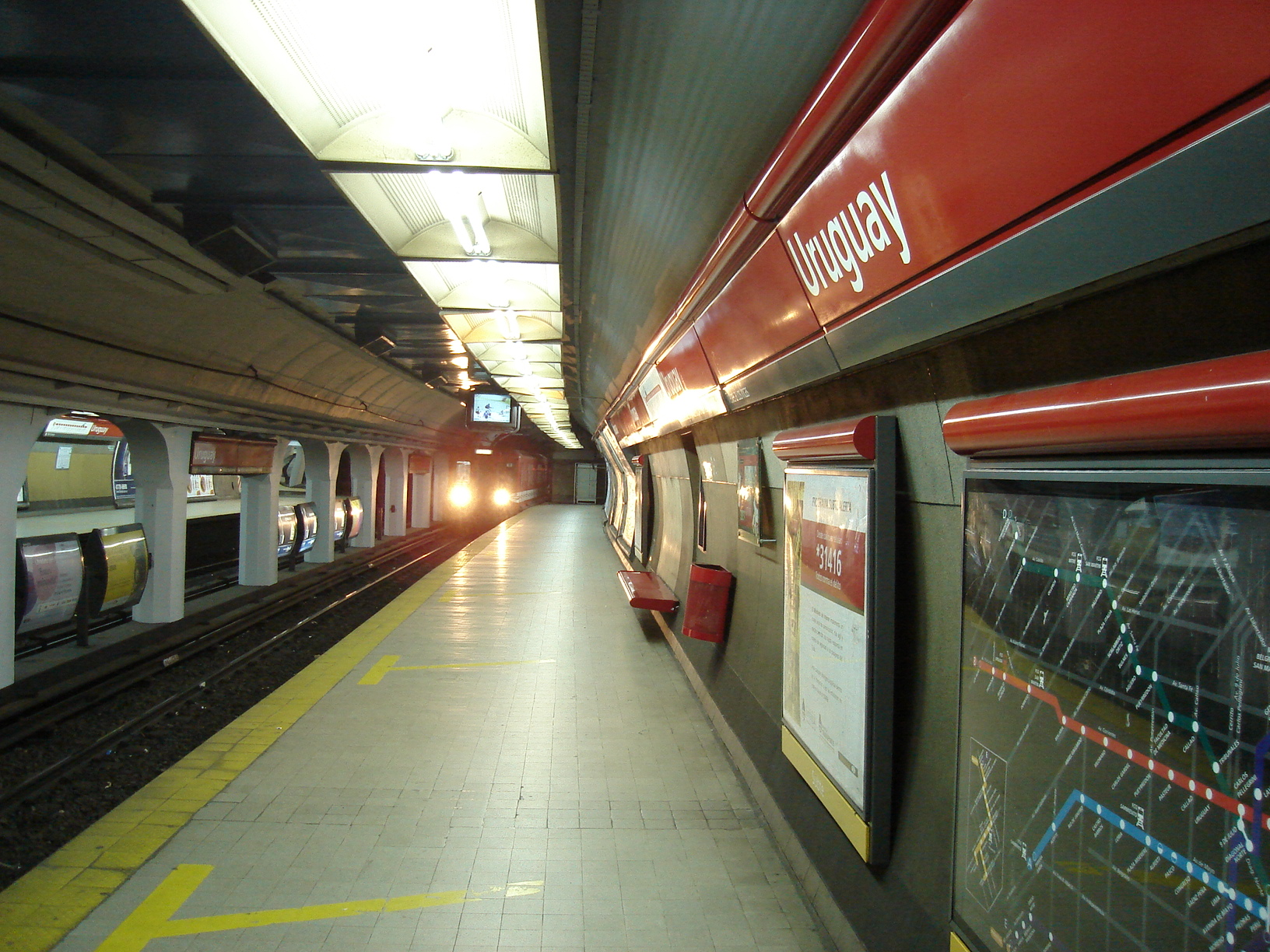

General information
- Location: Avenida Corrientes and Calle Uruguay
- Coordinates: 34°36′14.6″S 58°23′14.1″W
- Platforms: Side platforms

History
- Opened: 22 July 1931

Services
Preceding station	Buenos Aires Underground	Following station
Callao towards Juan Manuel de Rosas	Line B	Carlos Pellegrini towards Leandro N. Alem
Location

Uruguay is a station on Line B of the Buenos Aires Underground. It is located at the intersection of Avenida Corrientes and Calle Uruguay, near to the Courthouse and in the middle of the city's main theatre district. The station was opened on 22 July 1931 as part of the extension of the line from Callao to Carlos Pellegrini.

== Gallery ==
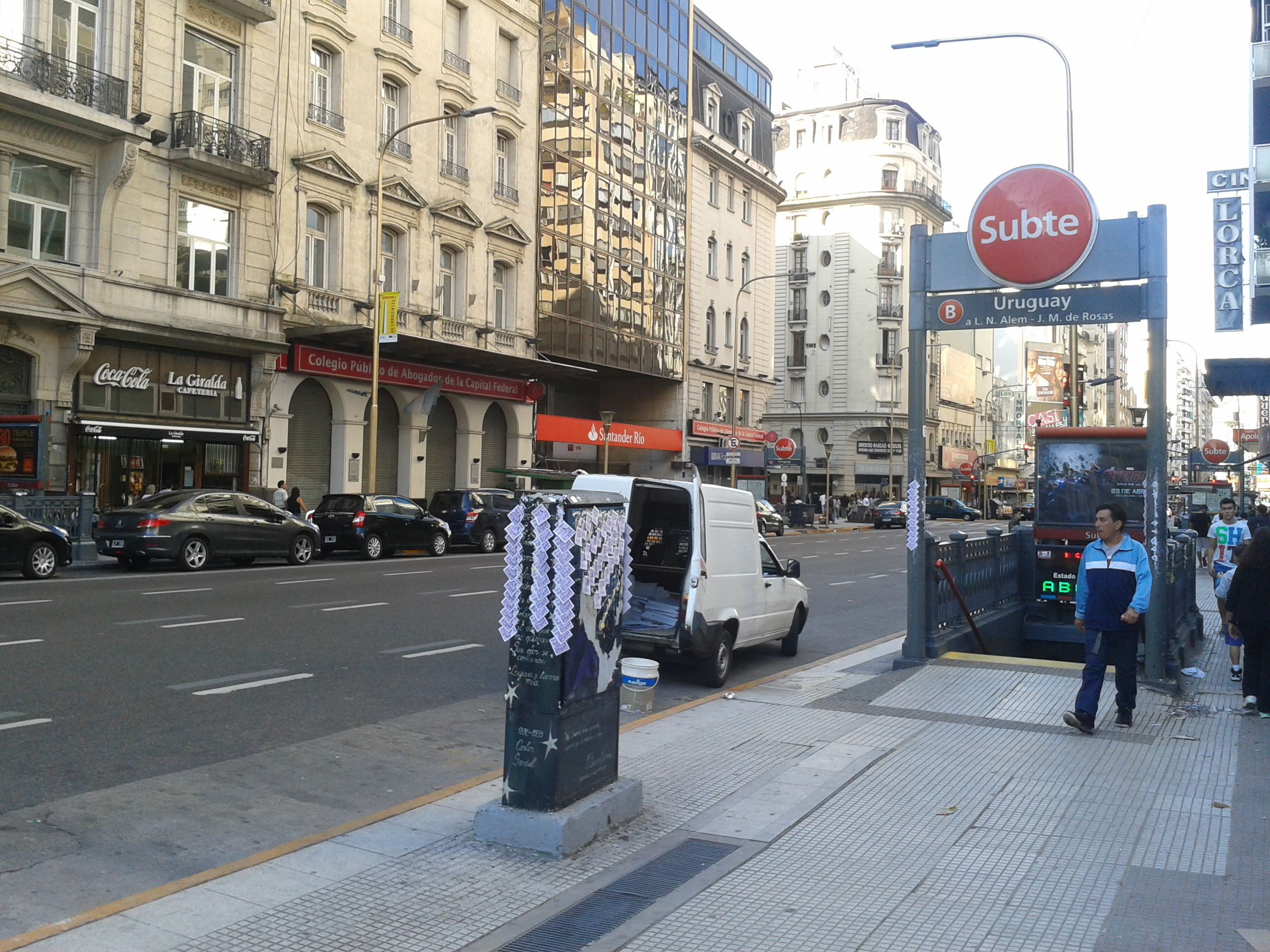
Station entrance

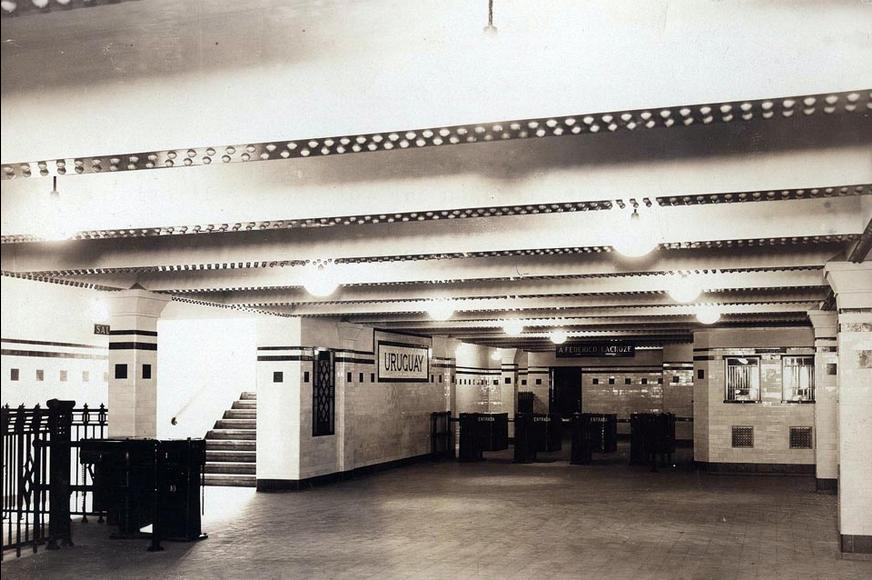
The station hall in 1931

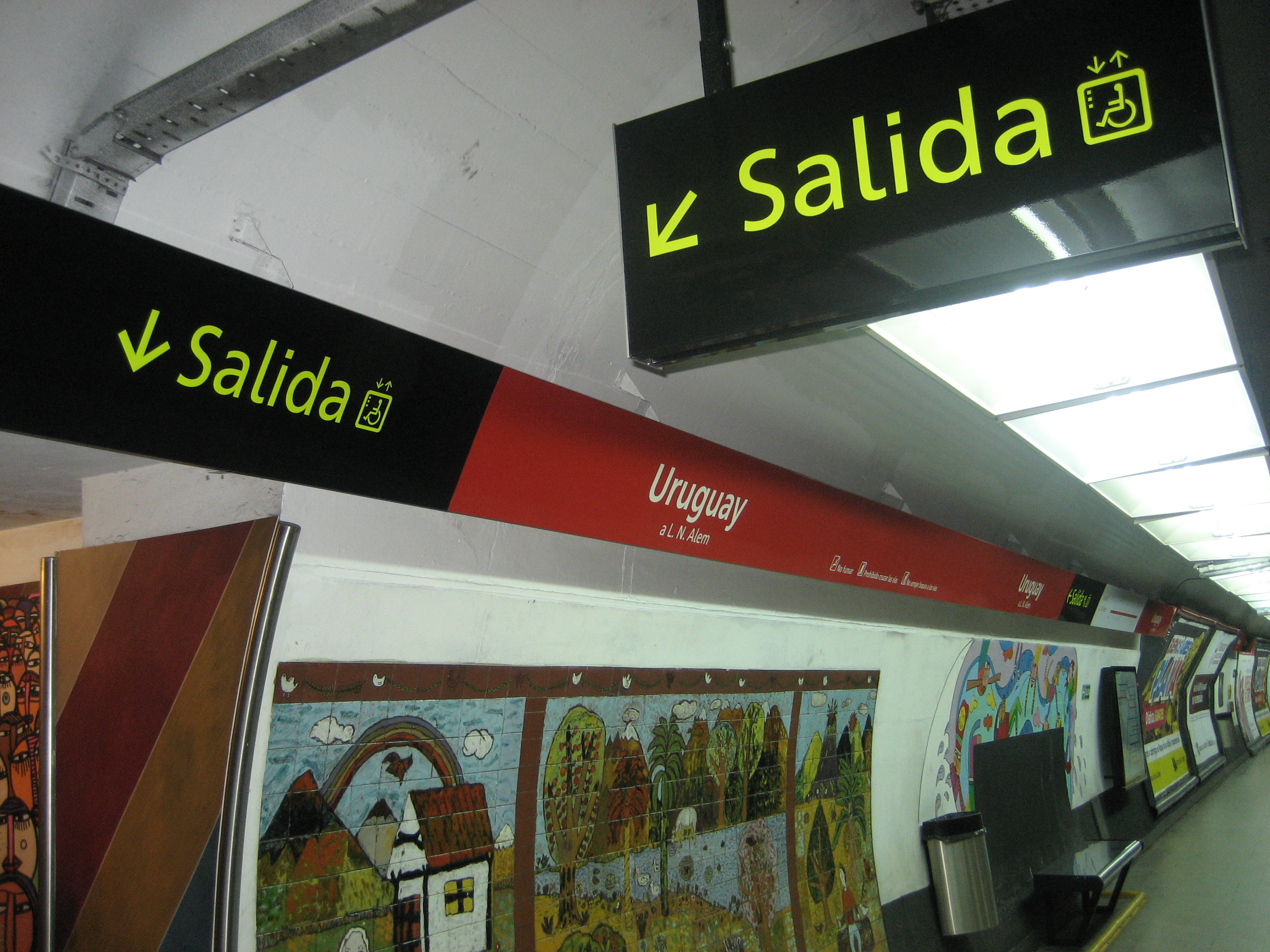
New signage
