= Echavarría =

Echavarría is a surname. It may refer to:

- Cristian Echavarría (born 1997), Colombian footballer
- Diego Echavarría Misas (1895–1971), Colombian businessman
- Héctor Echavarría (born 1969), Argentine actor
- Jaime R. Echavarría (1923–2010), Colombian musician
- Jesús María Echavarría Aguirre (1858–1954), Mexican bishop
- Jorge Echavarría (born 1988), Mexican footballer
- José María Marxuach Echavarría (1848–1910), Puerto Rican politician
- Juan Echavarría (born 1962), Colombian archer
- María Echavarría (born 1980), Colombian archer
- Nico Echavarría (born 1994), Colombian professional golfer

== See also ==
- Echeverría
- Etxeberria
