= Echeverri =

Echeverri may refer to:

== Surname ==
Echeverri, Echeverry or Echeberri is a surname of Basque origin, spelled Etxeberri in that language, and with a presence in Spanish and French speaking countries.

== Notable people ==
- Andrea Echeverri (born 1965), Colombian pop singer
- Carlos Echeverri Cortés (1900–1974), Colombian economist and diplomat
- Claudio Echeverri (born 2006), Argentine footballer
- Diego Echeverri (born 1989), Colombian footballer
- Fernando Martínez de Espinosa y Echeverri (fl. 1896), Spanish admiral
- Gilberto Echeverri Mejia (born 1936), Colombian politician and peace advocate
- Hector Echeverri (1938–1988), Colombian footballer
- Orlando Echeverri Benedetti (born 1980), Colombian writer and translator
- Isabella Echeverri (born 1994), Colombian footballer
- Juan Carlos Echeverry
  - Juan Carlos Echeverry (born 1962), Colombian economist and current president of Ecopetrol
  - Juan Carlos Echeverry, Colombian operatic tenor
- Luis Carlos Villegas Echeverri (born 1957), Colombian politician
- Rodrigo Londoño Echeverri (born 1959), Colombian politician and ex-guerilla
- Tatiana Echeverri Fernandez (born 1974), Costa Rican artist

== See also ==
- Etcheverry (disambiguation)
- Etxeberria, a Basque language placename and surname
