= Chavarria =

Chavarria or Chavarría may refer to:

== Surname ==
- Chavarria, a surname of Basque origin stemming from Echevarria, a variant of this form includes "Chavarri"

== Places ==
- Chavarría, Argentina

== People with the surname ==
- Anton Abad Chavarria (born 1958), Catalan poet and singer-songwriter
- Casiano Chavarría, Bolivian footballer
- Daniel Chavarría (1933–2018), Uruguay revolutionary and writer, living in Cuba
- Germán Chavarría (born 1958), Costa Rican footballer
- Jaime Quesada Chavarría, (born 1971), Spanish footballer
- Jorge Rossi Chavarría, (1922–2006), Costa Rican politician
- Kyle Chavarria (born 1995), American teen actress
- Luis Chavarría (born 1970), Chilean footballer
- Ossie Chavarria (born 1937), former Major League Baseball player
- Pablo Chavarría (born 1988), Argentine footballer
- Pep Chavarría (born 1998), Spanish footballer
- Willy Chavarria (born 1967), American fashion designer

== See also ==
- Echevarria (disambiguation)
- Etxeberria
