= Aguacatala station =

Medellín metro station

Aguacatala Estación Aguacatala
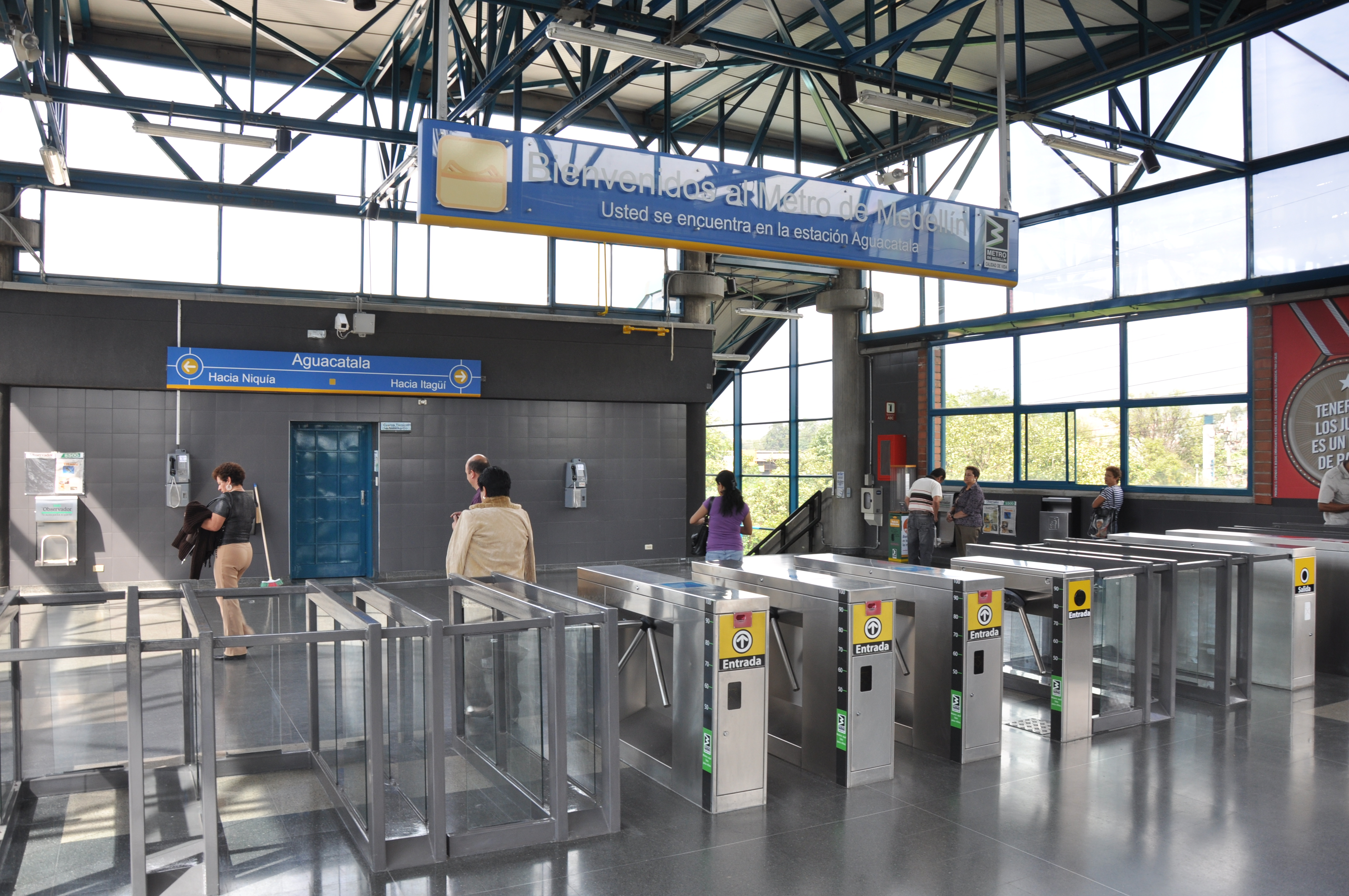

General information
- Location: El Poblado, Medellín; Colombia
- Coordinates: 6°11′39″N 75°34′54″W

History
- Opened: 30 September 1996; 29 years ago

Services
Preceding station	Medellín Metro	Following station
Poblado towards Niquía	Line A	Ayurá towards La Estrella
Location

Aguacatala is the 16th station on line A of the Medellín Metro going south. It is the last stop on the metro that is within the city limits of Medellín, Colombia, and it is located in the industrial area of the city. The station was opened on 30 September 1996 as part of the extension of the line from Poblado to Itagüí.

The station is immediate to the Liquor Factory of Antioquia and is adjacent to the Medellín River. It is also near EAFIT University.

== Description ==
The station is named after the Aguacatala neighborhood where it is located in El Poblado. From this part of the city to the south and along the river, there have traditionally been major factories and industries.

The station is also in proximity to a major road interchanges in the region, such as the Avenida del Rio or South Highway that connects to the Antioquia department in southwestern Colombia.
