= Echevarria =

Echevarri, Echevarría, Etxebarri(a) or Echávarri may refer to:

- Etxebarri, a town and municipality in Biscay in the Basque Country, Spain
  - Etxebarri (Bilbao Metro), a station of Line 1 and Line 2 of the Bilbao Metro
- Etxebarria, a town of Biscay in the Basque Country, Spain
- Etxeberria or Echevarría, a surname of Basque origin

== People with the surname ==
- Angel Echevarria (1971–2020), American baseball player
- Beñat Etxebarria (born 1987), Spanish professional football player
- Brian Echevarria, American politician
- Carlos Echevarría, Argentine film and television actor, writer and producer
- David Etxebarria (born 1973), Spanish cyclist
- Eloína Echevarría (born 1961), Cuban long jumper
- Emilio Echevarría (1944–2025), Mexican actor
- Fernando Echávarri (born 1972), Spanish yacht racer
- Ignacio Echevarría (born 1960), Spanish literary critic and essayist
- Javier Echevarría Rodríguez (1932–2016), Spanish Roman Catholic prelate
- Juan de Echevarría (1875–1931), Spanish painter
- Juan Miguel Echevarría (born 1998), Cuban long jumper
- Lucía Etxebarría (born 1966), Spanish writer
- Luis Echeverría (1922–2022), President of Mexico
- Luis E. Echávarri, Spanish engineer
- Lydia Echevarría (born 1931), Puerto Rican actress
- Ofill Echevarria (born 1972), Cuban painter and multimedia artist
- Pedro Echevarria (born 1967), television host and producer with C-SPAN
- René Echevarria, American television writer and producer
- Vicente Anastasio Echevarría (1768–1857), Argentine lawyer and politician

== See also ==
- Echeverría (disambiguation)
- Etcheverry (disambiguation)
