= Ayurá station =

Medellín metro station

Ayurá Estación Ayurá
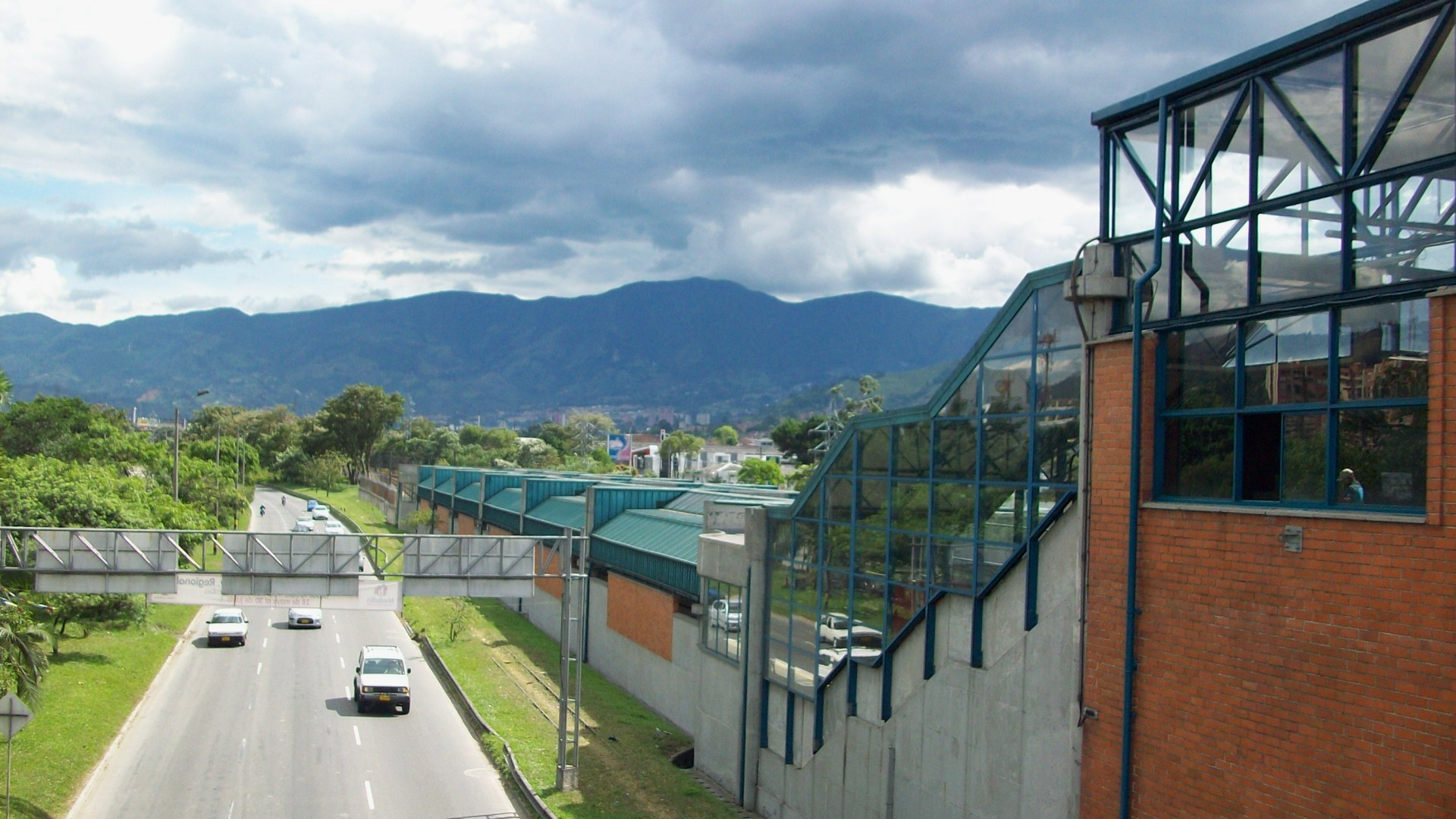
- Estación Ayurá I (Metro de Medellín)

General information
- Location: Envigado; Colombia
- Coordinates: 6°11′10″N 75°35′10″W

History
- Opened: 30 September 1996; 29 years ago

Services
Preceding station	Medellín Metro	Following station
Aguacatala towards Niquía	Line A	Envigado towards La Estrella
Location

Ayurá is the 17th station on line A of the Medellín Metro going south. It is the first stop on line A that is outside the city limits of Medellín, being in the city of Envigado instead. The Carrefour in Envigado is near this stop, on Las Vegas Avenue. The station was opened on 30 September 1996 as part of the extension of the line from Poblado to Itagüí.
