= Etcheverry =

Etcheverry is a Basque surname. Notable people with the surname include:

- Andrea Echeverri (born 1965), Colombian singer-songwriter
- Bautista Salvador Etcheverry Boggio (1931–2015), Uruguayan ambassador
- Carlos Alberto Etcheverry (1933–2014), Argentine footballer and coach
- Claudio Echeverri (born 2006), Argentine footballer
- Eduardo Etcheverry, Uruguayan chess master
- Héctor Echeverri (1938–1988), Colombian footballer
- Gary Etcheverry (born 1956), professional football coach
- Guillermo Jaim Etcheverry (born 1942), Argentine physician
- Juan Carlos Echeverry (disambiguation), multiple people
- Jésus Etcheverry (1911–1988), French opera conductor
- Marco Etcheverry (born 1970), Bolivian soccer player
- María Eugenia Etcheverry, Uruguayan military pilot
- Noelia Etcheverry (born 1986), Uruguayan television presenter
- Oscar Echeverry (born 1977), Colombian footballer
- Sam Etcheverry (1930–2009), Canadian football player/coach
- Tomás Martín Etcheverry (born 1999), Argentine tennis player
- Adriana Vacarezza Etcheverry (born 1961), Chilean actress
- Marcela Vacarezza Etcheverry (born 1970), Chilean television presenter, Miss Chile 1992

== See also ==
- Etxeberria, a Basque place name and surname
- Echeverría (disambiguation)
- Echeverri (disambiguation)
