= Chavarría, Argentina =

Chavarría
- Town
- Location of Cazadores Correntinos in Argentina
- Coordinates: 28°57′19″S 58°34′18″W
- Country: Argentina
- Province: Corrientes
- Department: San Roque

Population (2001)
  - Total: 2,031
- Time zone: UTC−3 (ART)

Chavarría is a small town in the San Roque Department, Corrientes Province, Argentina, located approximately 55 kilometres from San Roque. According to the 2001 population census conducted by INDEC its population was 2031 inhabitants. It is named in honor of Dr. Isaac Maria Chavarría, who was Minister of Works and Utilities at the time. It is located in a river area which is known as the Iberá Wetlands.

The main activity is agriculture-livestock-forestry. The village also has a historical museum which has a group of artisans making items with raw wool like jackets, berets, ponchos, etc.

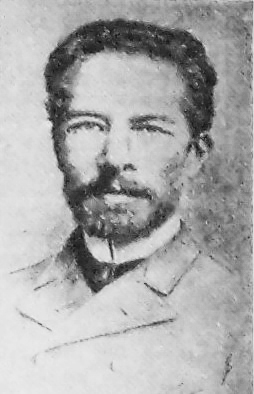
Dr. Isaac Maria Chavarría
