= Santafé Mall =

Santafé Medellín
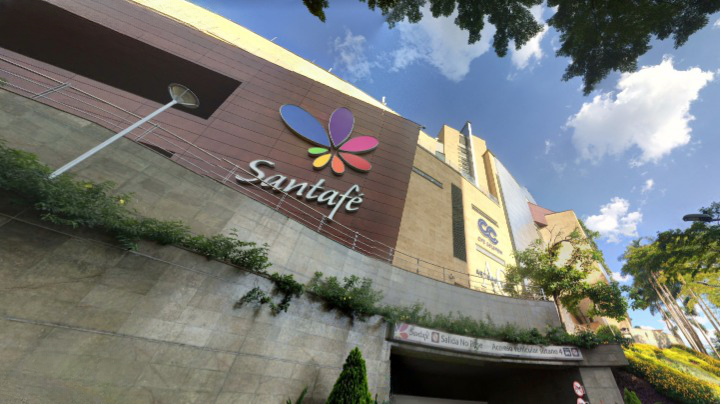
- Address: Carrera 43A Calle 7 Sur#170, Medellín, Antioquia, Colombia
- Opened: May 8, 2010
- Developer: Pedro Gómez & Cía.
- Architect: Victor Rincón; Andrés Solorzano; Camilo Becerra; Elinana Abrajim; William Cañon
- Num. of stores: 463
- Num. of anchor tenants: 3
- Floors: 4
- Parking: 2700, 6 basements
- Website: www.santafemedellin.com

Santafé Mall (Spanish: Centro Comercial Santafé) is a shopping mall located in the El Poblado area of Medellín, Colombia. This large, multilevel mall has four floors and a retractable glass top, and is home to hundreds of stores and restaurants. At the center of the mall there is a giant display every 1–3 months, it often involves flower patterns in the spring, and ice skating rinks in the winter.

The Santafé Mall was built after its sister mall of the same name in Bogotá. It was announced in February 2007, inaugurated on May 5, 2010, and opened on May 8, 2010. It is the largest shopping mall in Medellín, and the third-largest in the country, with over 195 thousand square meters of space (2.1 million square feet).
