= Nueve de Julio, Corrientes =

Nueve de Julio
- Town
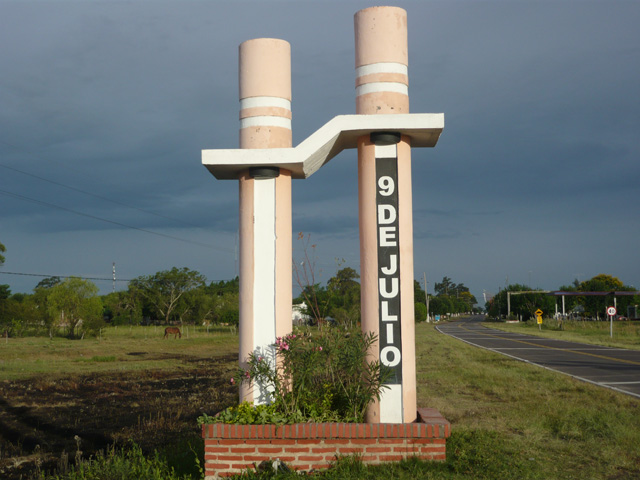

- Location of Nueve de Julio in Argentina
- Coordinates: 28°50′S 58°50′W
- Country: Argentina
- Province: Corrientes
- Department: San Roque

Population
  - Total: 2,671
- Time zone: UTC−3 (ART)
- CPA base: W3445
- Dialing code: +54 3777

Nueve de Julio is a town in the province of Corrientes, Argentina. It has about 2,700 inhabitants as per the 2001 census [INDEC].
