= Tronador - Villa Ortúzar (Buenos Aires Underground) =

Buenos Aires Underground station

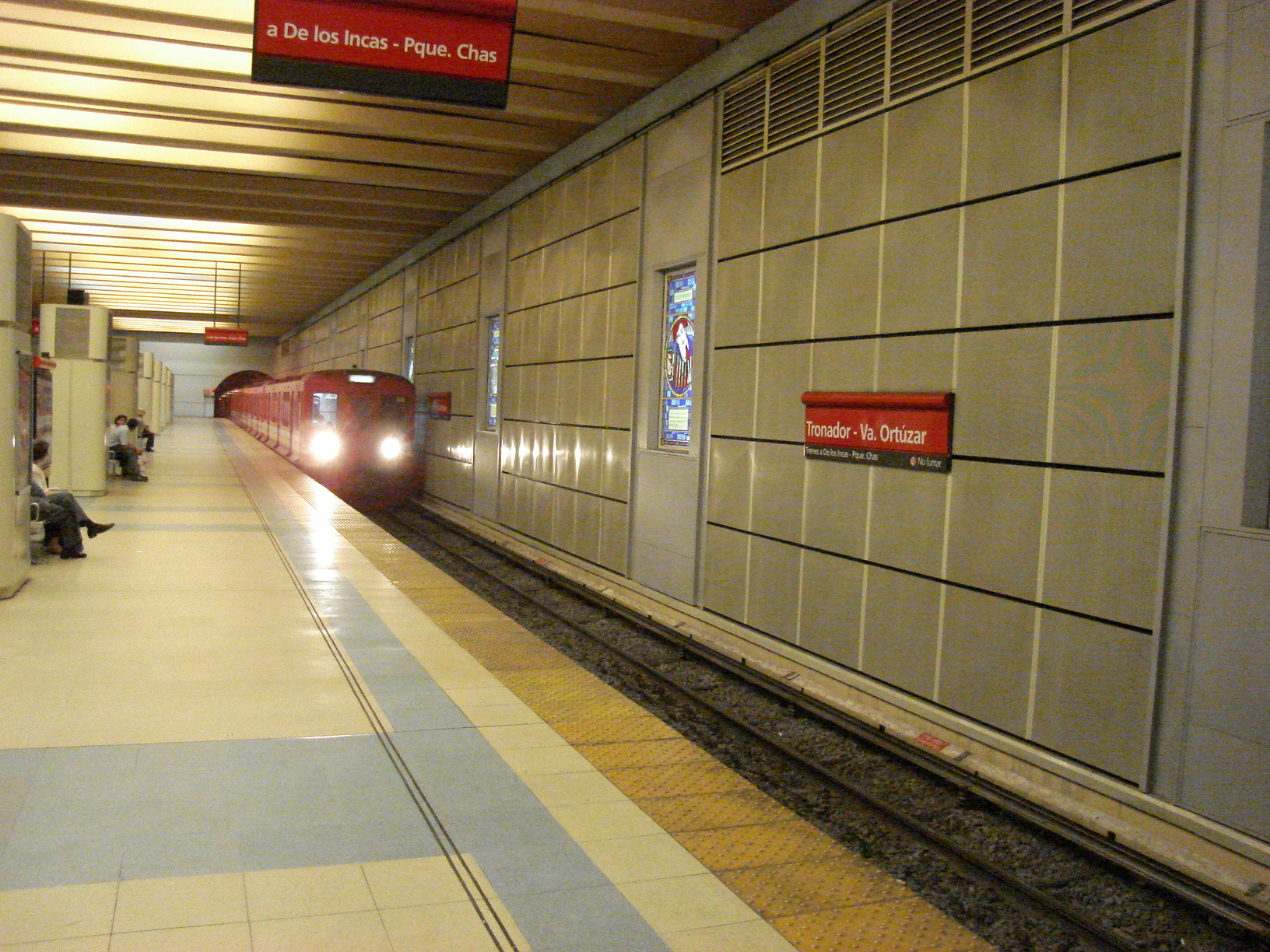

General information
- Location: Triunvirato and Tronador
- Coordinates: 34°35′2.9″S 58°27′58.5″W
- Platforms: Island platforms

History
- Opened: 9 August 2003

Services
Preceding station	Buenos Aires Underground	Following station
Los Incas - Parque Chas towards Juan Manuel de Rosas	Line B	Federico Lacroze towards Leandro N. Alem
Location

Tronador - Villa Ortúzar is a station on Line B of the Buenos Aires Underground. The station was opened on 9 August 2003 as part of the extension of the line between Federico Lacroze and Los Incas - Parque Chas.

It is located in the Villa Ortuzar barrio, at the intersection of Avenida Triunvirato and Calle Tronador, and named after the latter and the neighbourhood the station is in.
