= El Castillo Museum =

Museum in El Poblado, Medellín, Colombia

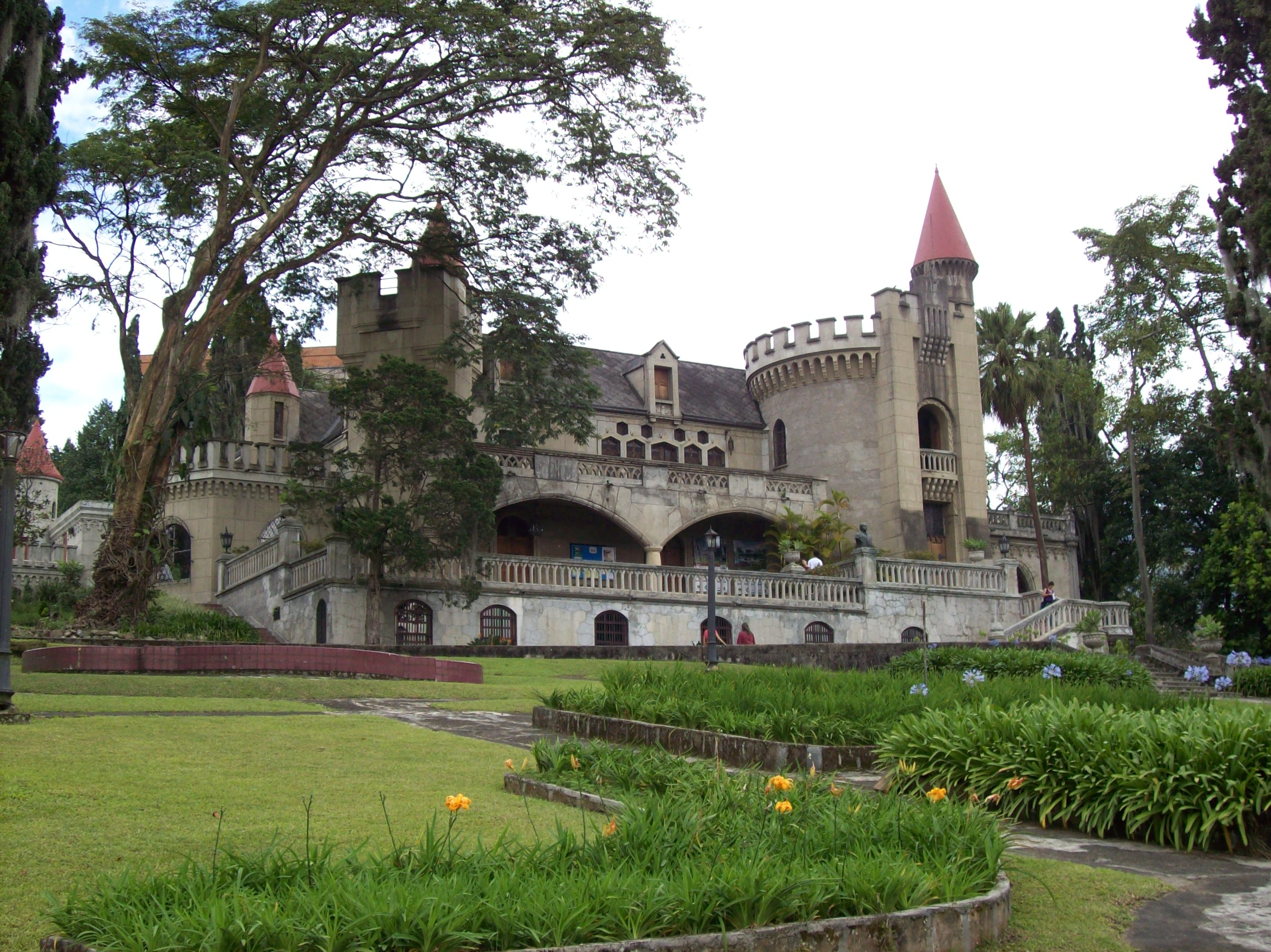
- Established: 1971
- Location: Medellín, Colombia
- Coordinates: 6°11′25″N 75°34′10″W
- Architect: Nel Rodríguez
- Website: www.museoelcastillo.org

El Castillo Museum is a Colombian museum in the El Poblado district of Medellín. It offers permanent exhibitions of objects in porcelain and glass, stained glass, antiques, paintings, and sculptures, among other things.

The permanent exhibit contains nine rooms and an outside garden.

== History ==
The building was constructed in 1930 by the architect Nel Rodríguez in the Medieval Gothic style. The design was inspired by castles in Loire Valley in France.

It was the house of physician José Tobón Uribe until 1943 when industrialist Diego Echavarría Misas bought the house for his family.
