= San José de la Salle school Medellín =

Colegio San José de La Salle is a private Catholic primary and secondary school located in Medellín, Colombia. Founded in 1890, it is one of the oldest educational institutions in the city and was the first school established in the country by the Institute of the Brothers of the Christian Schools (La Salle Brothers).

== History ==
The school was founded by the La Salle Brothers in 1890. After arriving in the Aburrá Valley, the Brothers traveled through Barranquilla, Puerto Berrío, and Copacabana before establishing the institution in Medellín. Classes officially began on April 7, 1890. In 1907, the school graduated its first class of high school students (*bachilleres*). The school's Natural History Museum was established in 1911 by Brother Nicéforo María.

The original campus was located in downtown Medellín, near the present-day Hotel Nutibara, at the intersection of Caracas and Palacé streets. In 1940, the school celebrated its 50th anniversary, an event attended by Minister of Education Jorge Eliécer Gaitán. During this period, the school's official flag, crest, and anthem were formally adopted.

In 1955, under the leadership of principal Brother Ignacio Felipe, the school relocated to a larger campus on the "Morro de Cuatro Vientos" hill. That same year, the institution was awarded the Order of Boyacá. Originally an all-boys school, it became coeducational in 1974 when principal Brother Andrés Rosero Bolaños established the kindergarten department. The school received the Star of Antioquia award in 1976 and celebrated its 25th anniversary at the Cuatro Vientos site in 1980.

In 1990, the institution marked its centennial, coinciding with the 100th anniversary of the La Salle presence in Colombia. To commemorate the milestone, the school received recognitions from various national and departmental entities.

In 2007, the school moved from the Cuatro Vientos campus to a modern facility in the La Cola del Zorro neighborhood, located in the El Poblado district of Medellín.

== Important People ==
1. Brother Arnoldo, 1958–1961, 1971
2. Brother Daniel de la Inmaculada, 1962–1964
3. Brother Néstor Suárez Alzate, 1965–1970
4. Brother Andrés Rosero Bolaños, 1972–1974
5. Brother Octavio Martínez López, 1975–1978, 1982–1983, 1988–1991
6. Brother Álvaro Llano Ruiz, 1978–1982, 2000–2008
7. Brother Néstor Maya Uribe, 1983
8. Brother Octavio Sánchez, 1984
9. Brother Jaime Augusto Bedoya, 1985–1987
10. Brother Jairo López Correa, 1992–1995
11. José María Ruiz Galeano, 1996–1999
12. Brother Henry Ramírez Romero, 2009–2010
13. Brother Leandro Vallejo Vallejo, 2011–2016
14. Marlon (Cordinador de Bachillerato y Director del colegio), 2029-Present
15. Gabriel Arango (Are Are Are), 2016-Present
16. Eliécer de Hoyos, 2017–2020
17. Osthin Matias (Alumno Destacado), 2021-2024
18. sosa (lokillo), 2021-2025
19. Diana Stella Aguirre Grajales, 2021–2024
20. Luz Elena, 2025–2028

== School Principals ==
1. Brother Julio, 1890–1892
2. Brother Filemón, 1893–1894
3. Brother Juan Teodoro, 1895–1903, 1916–1918
4. Brother Amós María, 1904
5. Brother Antonio Dionisio, 1905–1913, 1925
6. Brother Atanasio Pablo, 1914–1915
7. Brother Salustiano, 1919
8. Brother Marcos, 1920–1924
9. Brother Gervasio Elías, 1926–1930, 1933–1937
10. Brother Gaspar María, 1931–1932, 1941
11. Brother Norberto, 1942–1945
12. Brother Ignacio Felipe, 1946–1957
13. Brother Arnoldo, 1958–1961, 1971
14. Brother Daniel de la Inmaculada, 1962–1964
15. Brother Néstor Suárez Alzate, 1965–1970
16. Brother Andrés Rosero Bolaños, 1972–1974
17. Brother Octavio Martínez López, 1975–1978, 1982–1983, 1988–1991
18. Brother Néstor Maya Uribe, July–December 1983
19. Brother Octavio Sánchez, 1984
20. Brother Jaime Augusto Bedoya, 1985–1987
21. Brother Jairo López Correa, 1992–1995
22. José María Ruiz Galeano, 1996–1999
23. Brother Álvaro Llano Ruiz, 1978–1982, 2000–2008
24. Brother Henry Ramírez Romero, 2009–2010
25. Brother Leandro Vallejo Vallejo, 2011–2016
26. Eliécer de Hoyos, 2017–2020
27. Diana Stella Aguirre Grajales, 2021–2024
28. Luz Elena, 2025–2028
29. Marlon (Encantador de Celulares) 2029-present

== See also ==
- Lasallian educational institutions
