= Echeverría =

Echeverría is a surname of Basque origin (spelled Etxeberria in that language) and that is widespread in Spanish-speaking countries.

== Notable people ==
- Atanasio Echeverría y Godoy (1771–1803), Mexican botanical artist and naturalist
- Axel Echeverria (born 1980), German politician
- Bernardino Echeverría Ruiz (1912–2000), Roman Catholic cardinal
- Bolívar Echeverría (1941–2010), Ecuadorian-Mexican Philosopher
- Esteban Echeverría (1805–1851), Argentine writer and political activist
- Francisco de Borja Echeverría (1848–1904), Chilean Conservative Party deputy and diplomat
- José Antonio Echeverría (1932–1957), Cuban revolutionary and student leader
- Liza Echeverría (b. 1972), Mexican actress and model
- Luis Echeverría Álvarez (1922–2022), president of Mexico (1970–1976)
- Mariano Echeverría (born 1981), Argentine football coach
- Rob Echeverria (b. 1967), American guitarist
- Sandra Echeverría (b. 1981), Mexican actress and singer
- Santiago Echeverría (born 1990), Argentine footballer

== Company ==
- Star Bonifacio Echeverria, Spanish manufacturer of small arms
- Patricio Echeverría, SA (PESA), long-standing company in the steel industry in the Basque province of Gipuzkoa, Spain

== Places ==
- Esteban Echeverría, an Argentine partido or district in Buenos Aires
- Echeverría (Buenos Aires Underground), a station on the Buenos Aires Subway
- Echeverría metro station (Santiago), a ghost station on Santiago Metro Line 4A

== See also ==
- Echavarría
- Echeveria
- Etcheverry
- Etxeberria
