= Hechavarría =

Hechavarría is a Basque surname. It is an alternative Castilianized spelling of modern Basque Etxeberria. Notable people with this name include:

- Adeiny Hechavarria (born 1989), Cuban baseball player
- Bárbara Hechavarría (born 1966), Cuban discus thrower
- Cariola Hechavarría (born 1976), Cuban basketball player
- Lucía Chacón Hechavarría (1911–2024), Cuban supercenternarian
