= Envigado station =

Envigado 1996

Envigado Estación Envigado
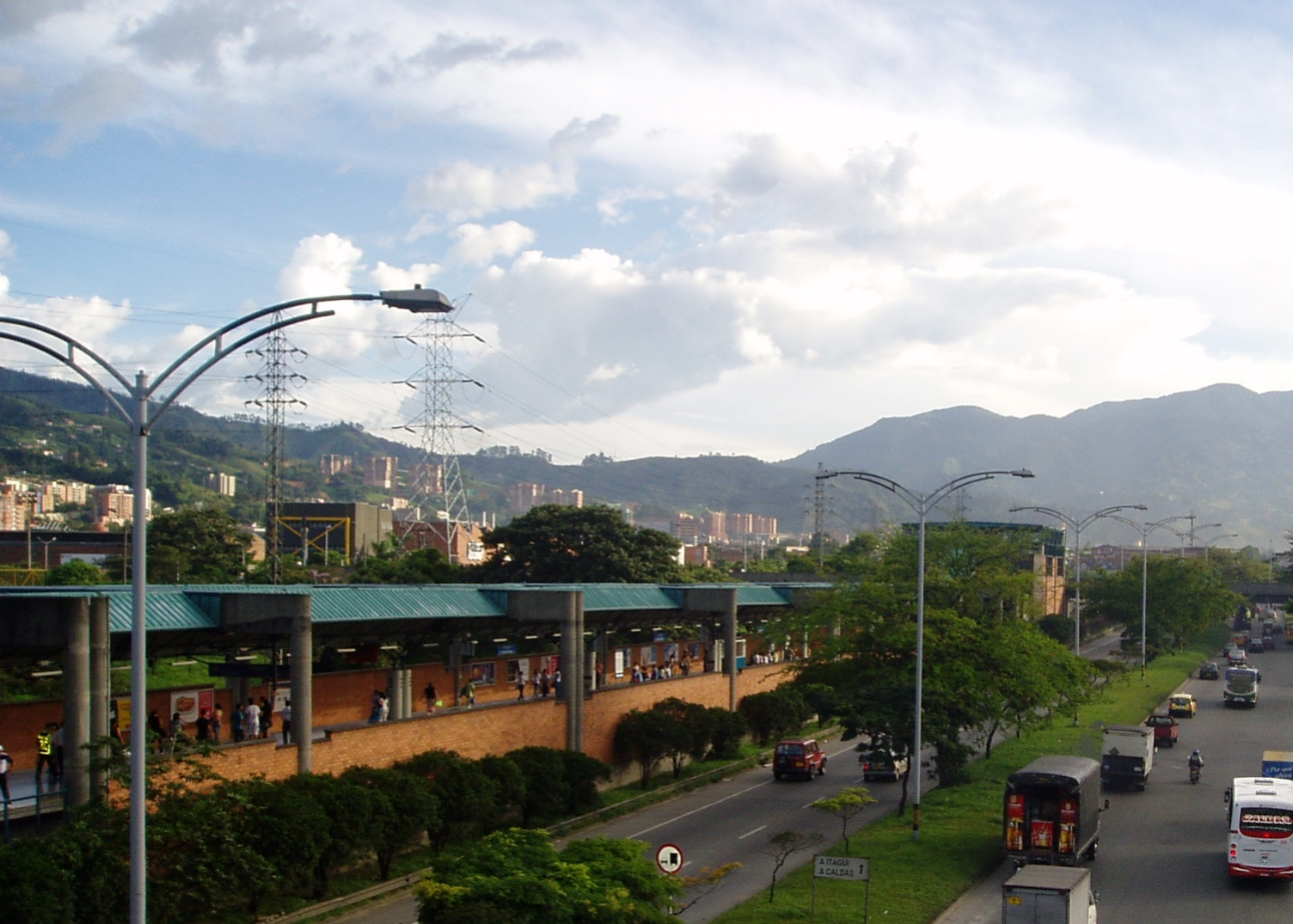
- Estación Envigado (Metro de Medellín)

General information
- Location: Envigado; Colombia
- Coordinates: 6°10′29″N 75°35′49″W

History
- Opened: 30 September 1996; 29 years ago

Services
Preceding station	Medellín Metro	Following station
Ayurá towards Niquía	Line A	Itagüí towards La Estrella
Location

Envigado is the 18th station on line A of the Medellín Metro going south. It is named after the city where it is located, Envigado. The station was opened on 30 September 1996 as part of the extension of the line from Poblado to Itagüí.
