= Diego Echavarría Misas =

Colombian businessman (1895–1971)

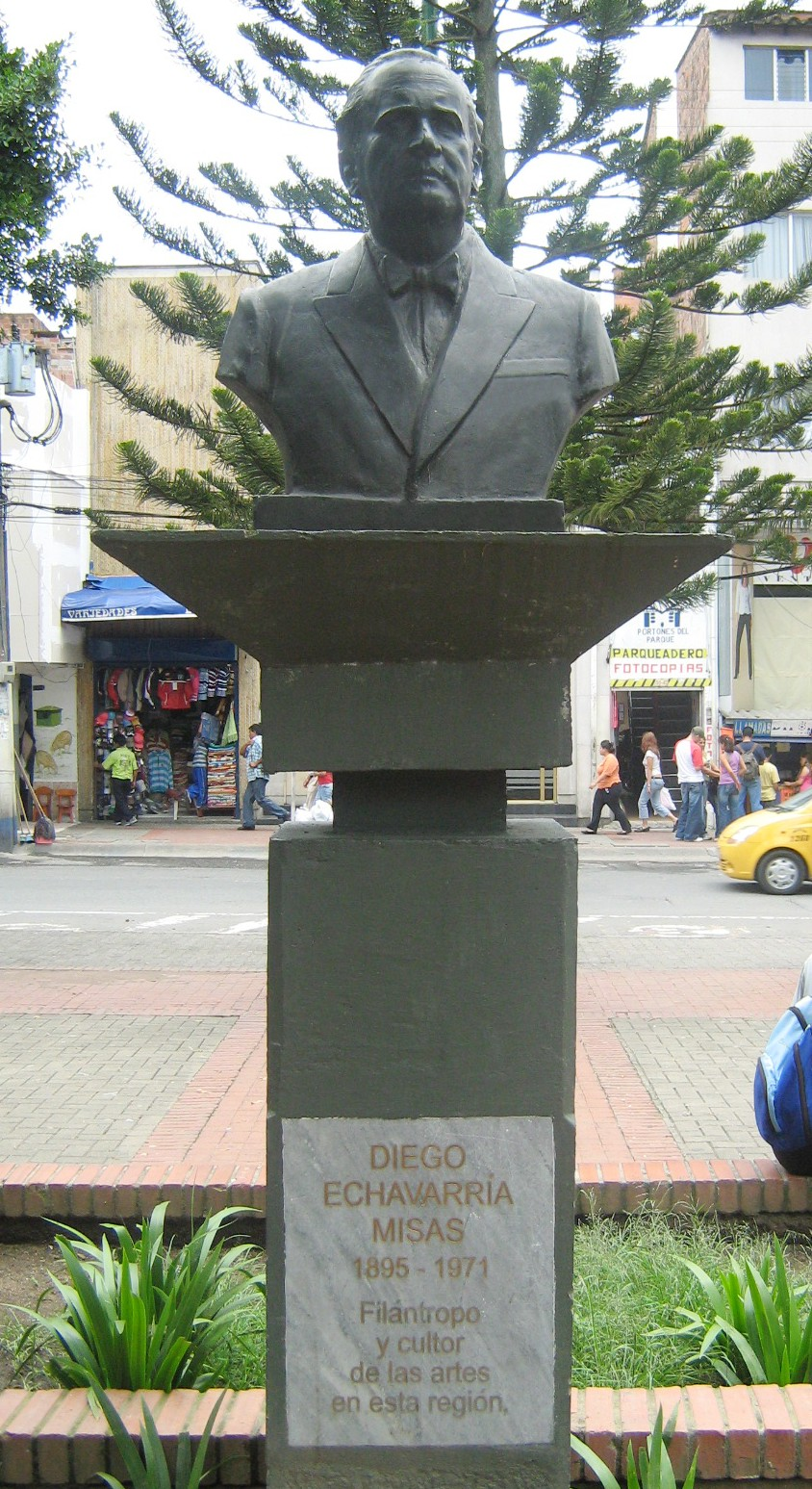
- Bust of Diego Echavarría Misas, located in the main square of the city of Itagui, Colombia.
- Born: 25 February 1895; Itagüí, Colombia
- Died: 19 September 1971; Medellín, Colombia
- Education: Otto-Kühne-Schule in Bad Godesberg
- Spouse: Benedikta Zur Nieden
- Children: Isolda Echavarría

Diego Echavarría Misas (25 February 1895 in Itagüí – 19 September 1971 in Medellín) was a Colombian businessman. As a philanthropist, he contributed significantly to the region of Aburrá Valley, especially his hometown, Itagüí.

== Personal life ==
Echavarría was the son of Alejandro Echavarria Isaza, a well-known businessman originally from Barbosa, and Ana Josefa Misas Euse. At 16 years old, he was sent to Germany, where he attended high school at the Otto-Kühne-Schule in Bad Godesberg. Soon after, he travelled throughout Europe whilst periodically visiting Medellin, where he worked with his father. He eventually settled in Paris.

He married Benedikta Zur Nieden, who is known as "Dita". The couple had a daughter, Isolda Echavarría Zur Nieden, and eventually moved to Itagüí.

Echavarría died on 19 September 1971, after being kidnapped and murdered by the "El Mono" Trejos gang in Medellín.

== Philanthropic projects ==
Echavarría and his wife Dita bought an estate in Itagüí which he called Aires de Dita, in honor of his wife. He later changed its name to Ditaires. The original land of the estate has since been used for the construction of residential neighborhoods, as well as the Casa de la Cultura de Itagúí (English: Itagüí House of Culture), Colegio Alemán de Medellín (English: German School of Medellín), and the park Recreativo Ditaires. The main part of Dita and Diego's estate remains intact, and it's today used as a convention center.

Echavarría was motivated to help fund the construction of the clinic in San Antonio de Prado after observing the precarious living conditions of farmers in the region. He alone paid for half of the construction costs.

In 1945, he funded the construction of the Fundación Biblioteca de Itagüí, which he would later call one of his favorite projects. Approximately 10,000 readers visited the building in 1960, and by 1971 there were 354,236 annual visitors. Initially, the library hosted painting classes, but the large number of users of the library stretched the institution's resources. In 1987, the building was converted into an auditorium, as the library's collection was relocated to Parque Obrero. Today, the building is known as the Biblioteca Diego Echavarría Misas, in its original patron's honor.

In 1970 he donated a large part of land from his estate in Itagüí for the construction of a school in the neighborhood of Santa Ana. The school became named Colegio Waldorf. Isolda Echavarría in memory of his daughter, who had died in the United States while attending university due to the rare disease Guillain–Barré syndrome. With the patronage of his family, Echavarría created a foundation for educational and charitable works located in the Pedregal neighborhood. The foundation provided the local population with practical education and medical care. While the center was under construction, Echavarría is said to have visited to monitor its progress almost daily.

Echavarría later moved to El Poblado, where he purchased El Castillo, a large estate where he installed his art collection. After his death in 1971, his wife Dita donated the property to a foundation. Today, the building still operates as a cultural center and is open to the public as a museum. Echavarría's last philanthropic project before his death was the creation of a library in Barbosa.
