= Los Incas - Parque Chas (Buenos Aires Underground) =

Buenos Aires Underground station

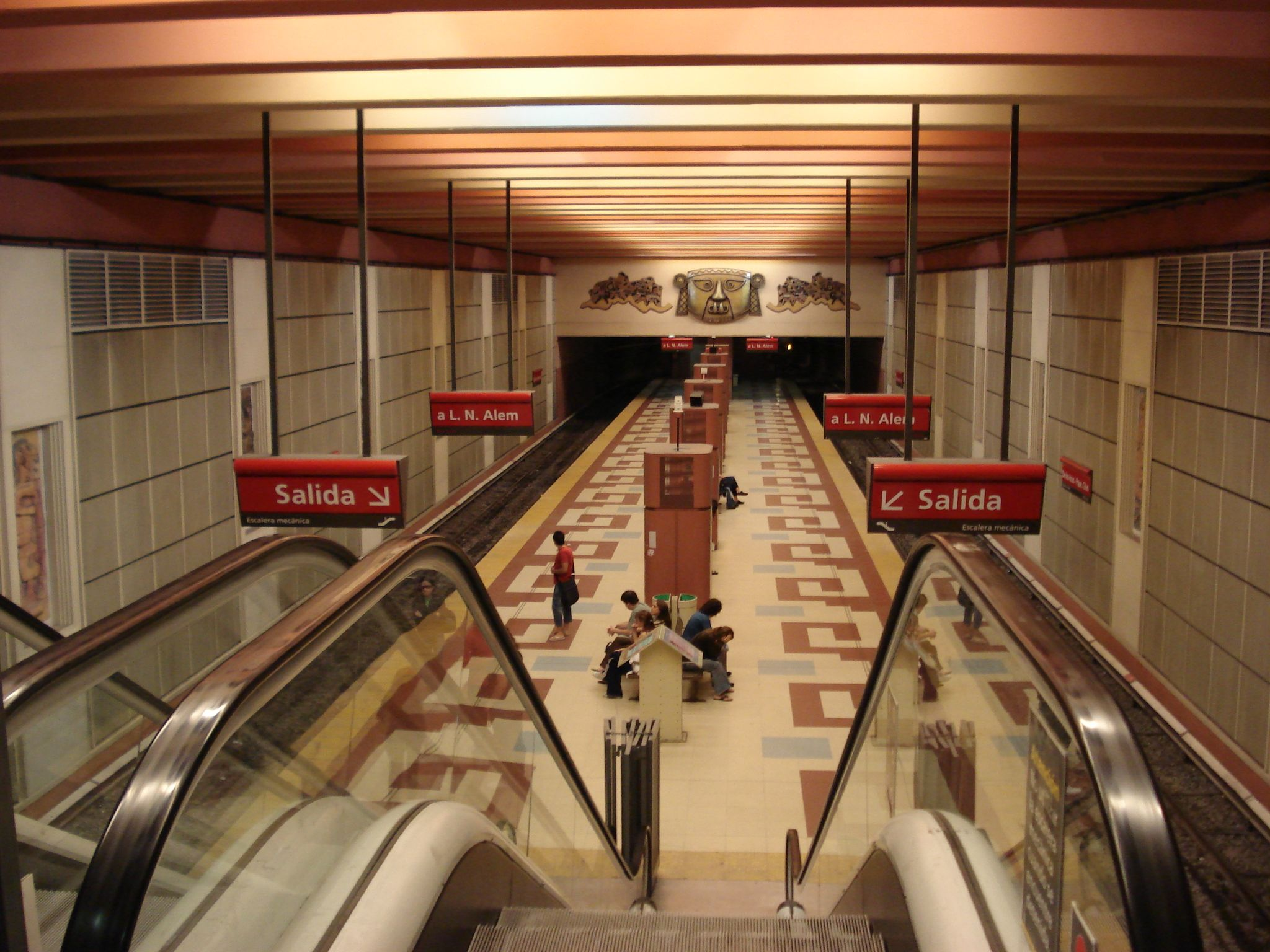

General information
- Location: Triunvirato and de Los Incas
- Coordinates: 34°34′52.5″S 58°28′27.5″W
- Platforms: Island platforms

History
- Opened: 9 August 2003

Services
Preceding station	Buenos Aires Underground	Following station
Echeverría towards Juan Manuel de Rosas	Line B	Tronador - Villa Ortúzar towards Leandro N. Alem
Location

Los Incas - Parque Chas is a station on Line B of the Buenos Aires Underground. The station was opened on 9 August 2003 as the western terminus of the extension of the line from Federico Lacroze. It remained the terminus of the line until the opening of Juan Manuel de Rosas station on 26 July 2013.

It is located between the Villa Ortuzar and Parque Chas barrios, at the intersection of Avenida Triunvirato and Avenida de Los Incas.

== Gallery ==
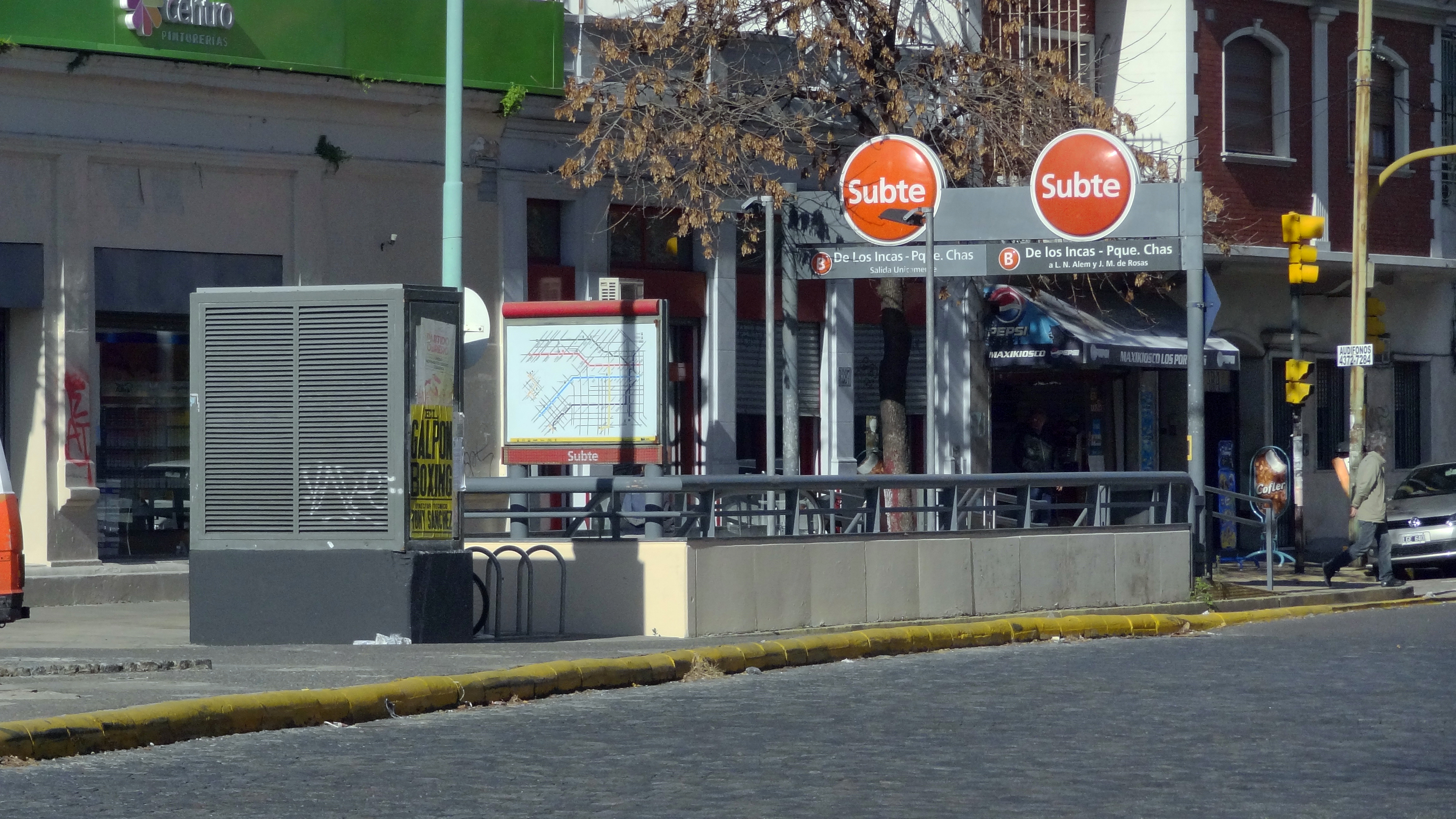

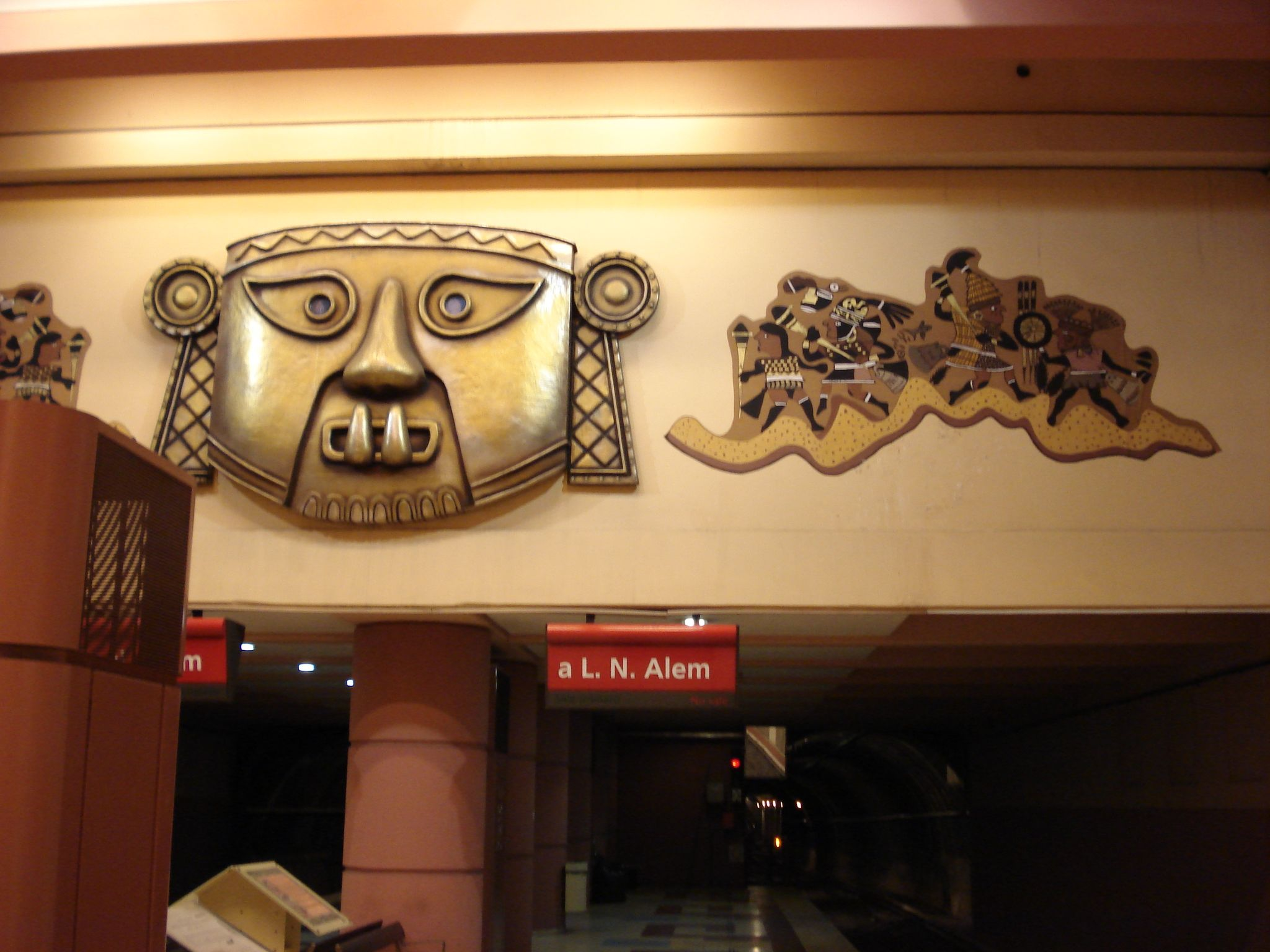

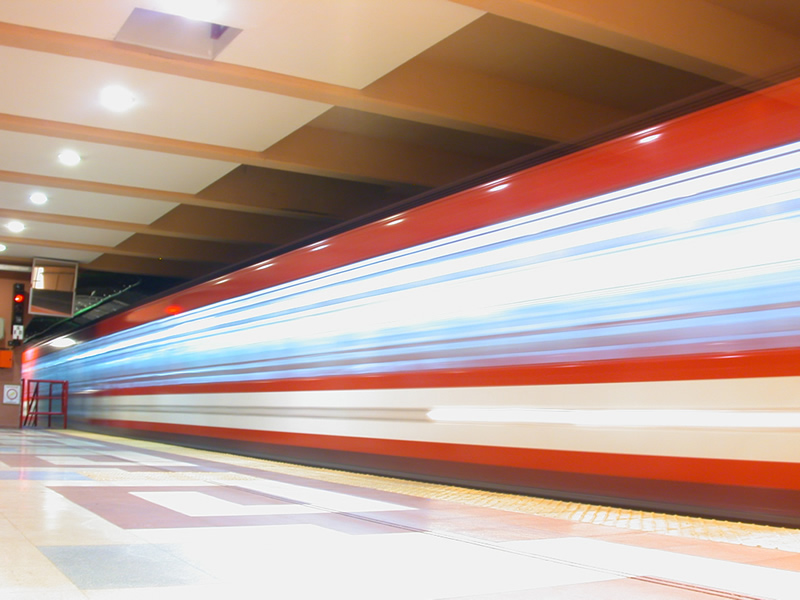
