= Jorge Echavarría =

Mexican footballer (born 1988)

Personal information
- Full name: Jorge Arturo Echavarría Alemán
- Date of birth: 18 January 1988 (age 38)
- Place of birth: Río Bravo, Tamaulipas, Mexico
- Height: 1.73 m (5 ft 8 in)
- Position: Defender

Senior career*
Years	Team	Apps	(Gls)
2007–2008	Real Colima		
2009–2011	Indios	54	(5)
2012	Altamira	6	(0)
2012–2014	Querétaro	27	(1)
2014	→ Delfines (loan)	7	(0)
2015–2017	Coras	30	(2)
2017–2018	Zacatepec	13	(0)
2018–2019	Potros UAEM	19	(1)
2019	Loros UdeC	10	(0)
- * Club domestic league appearances and goals as of 23:52, 30 July 2019 (UTC)

Jorge Arturo Echavarría Alemán (born January 18, 1988) is a professional Mexican footballer who currently plays for Loros UdeC.
