= Echeverría (Buenos Aires Underground) =

Buenos Aires Underground station

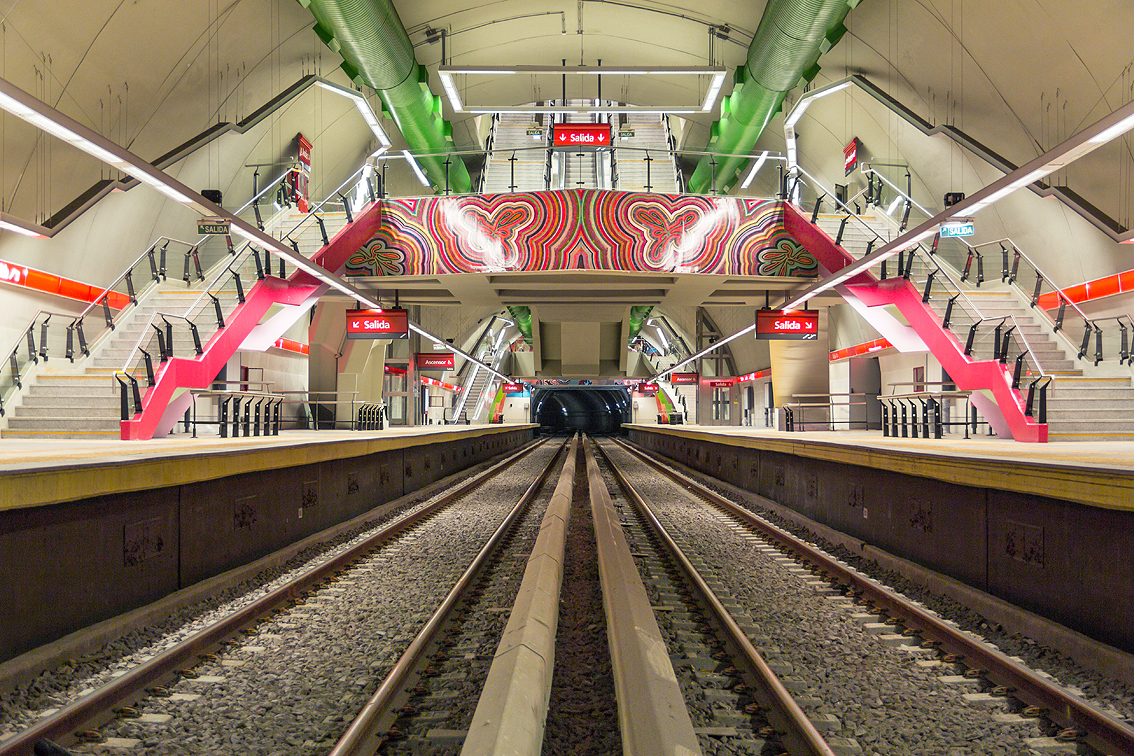

General information
- Location: Triunvirato and Echeverría
- Coordinates: 34°34′43″S 58°28′47″W
- Platforms: Side platforms

History
- Opened: July 26, 2013

Services
| Preceding station | Buenos Aires Underground | Following station |
|---|---|---|
| Juan Manuel de Rosas Terminus | Line B | Los Incas - Parque Chas towards Leandro N. Alem |
Location

Echeverría is a station on Line B of the Buenos Aires Underground. It was first opened on July 26, 2013, as part of the extension of the line from Los Incas - Parque Chas to Juan Manuel de Rosas.

== Gallery ==
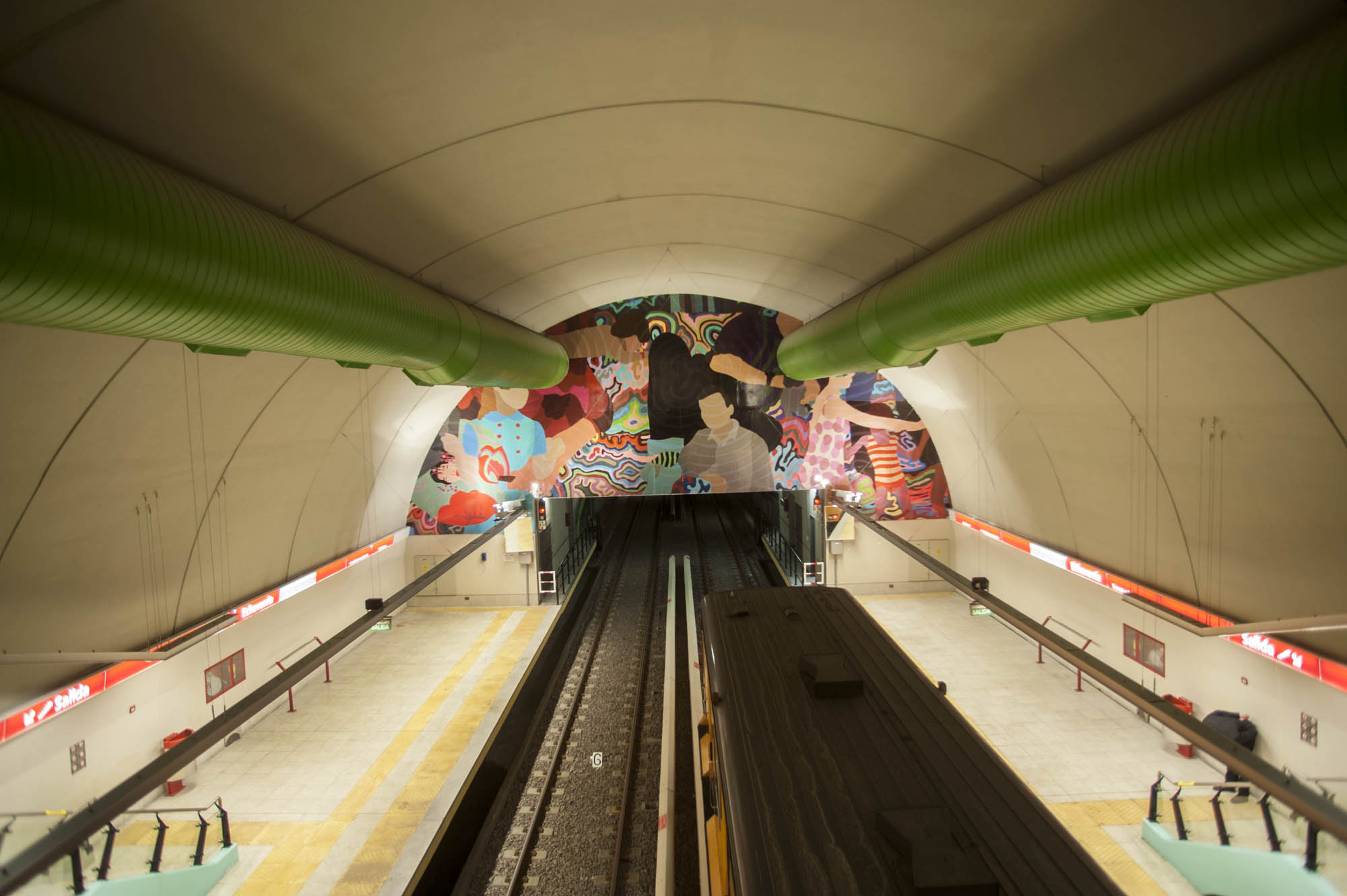

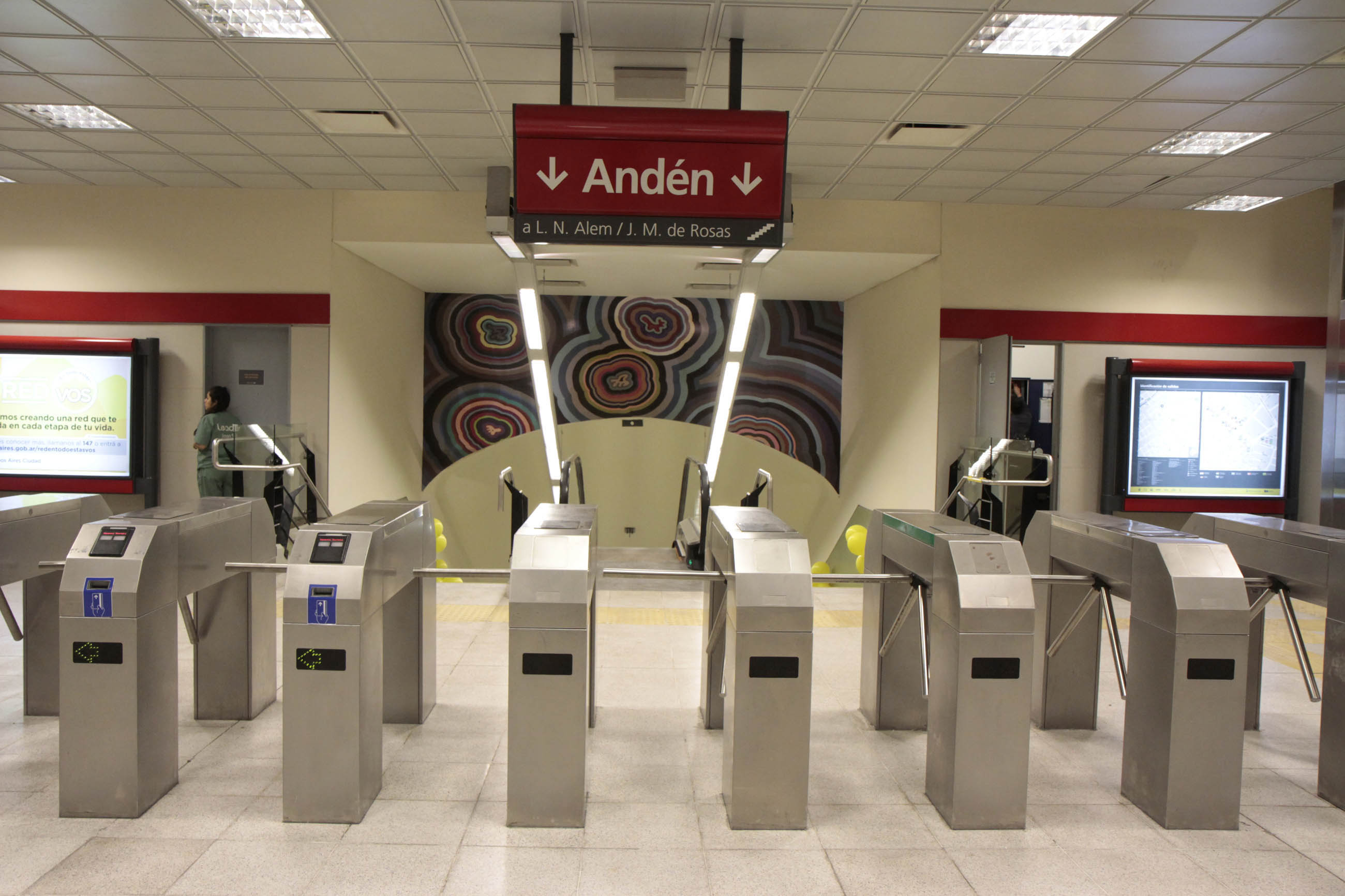

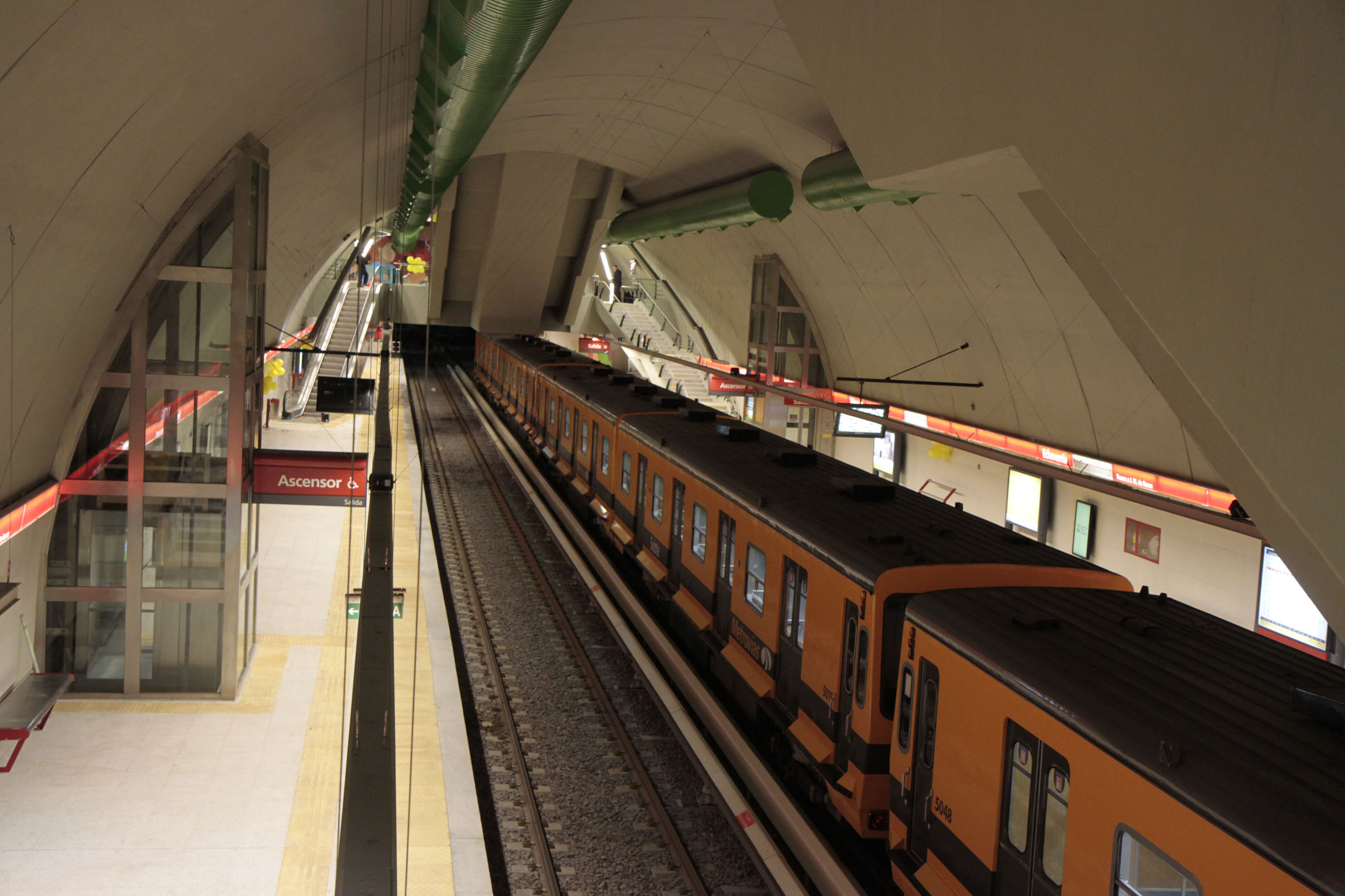
