= San Roque Department =

San Roque Department Departamento San Roque (Spanish) Tetãvore Sán Rróke (Guarani)
- Department
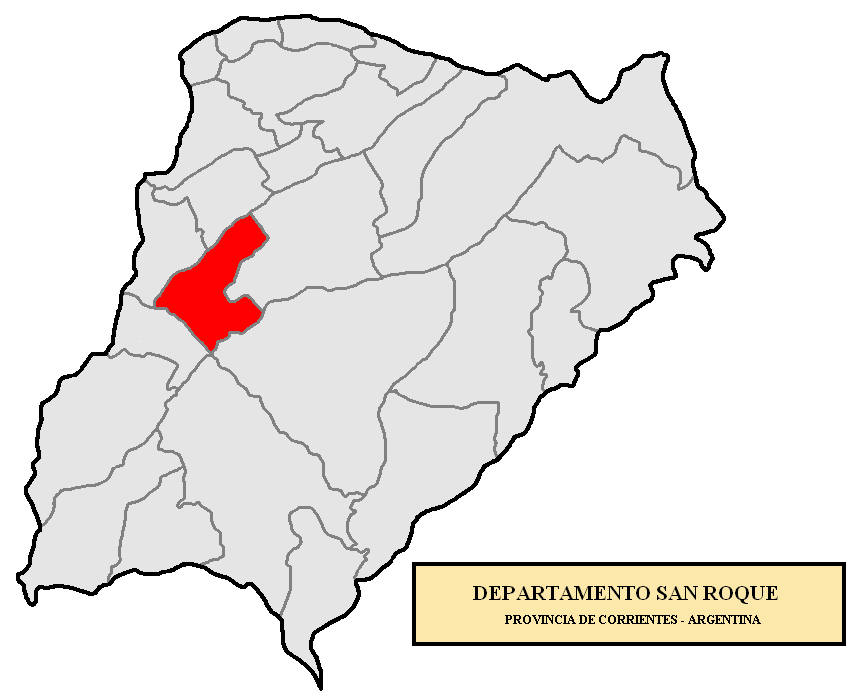
- location of San Roque Department in Corrientes Province
- Coordinates: 28°34′S 58°43′W
- Country: Argentina
- Seat: San Roque

Area
  - Total: 2,243 km^{2} (866 sq mi)

Population (2001 census [INDEC])
  - Total: 17,951
  - Density: 8.003/km^{2} (20.73/sq mi)
- Postal Code: W3448
- Area Code: 03777
- Website: www.conociendosanroque.com.ar

San Roque Department is a department of Corrientes Province in Argentina.

The provincial subdivision has a population of about 17,951 inhabitants in an area of 2,243 km^{2} (866 sq mi), its capital city is San Roque.

== Settlements ==
- Nueve de Julio
- Chavarría
- Pedro R. Fernández
- San Roque
