= Tatiana Echeverri Fernandez =

Costa Rican-born Colombian artist and producer

- Born: 1974 (age 51–52); San Jose, Costa Rica
- Education: Kunstakademie Düsseldorf Student of Rosemarie Trockel. Royal College of Arts, London
- Website: http://www.bodyproxy.net

Tatiana Echeverri Fernandez was born 1974 in San Jose, Costa Rica. She is a Colombian artist and electronic sound producer. She now lives and works in Berlin. Echeverri Fernandez works in several mediums including installations, sculpture, performance and sound. She studied at Kunsthochschule Kassel and the Kunstakademie Düsseldorf before moving to England to study at The Royal College of Art, London. Since 2000 she has exhibited in group and solo shows internationally.

A recent performance work, titled SCHWERBELASTUNGSKÖRPER (Heavy Stress Body), takes "migration and resilience as its main theme, beginning with mutual tolerance and openness."

Tatiana Echeverri Fernandez runs the independent project space Changing Room in Berlin as part of her research and praxis.
