= Juan Carlos Echeverry =

Juan Carlos Echeverry may refer to:

- Juan Carlos Echeverry (singer), Colombian operatic tenor
- Juan Carlos Echeverry (politician) (born 1962), Colombian economist and current president of Ecopetrol
