= San Roque, Corrientes =

San Roque Sán Rróke (Guarani)
- City
- Location of San Roque in Argentina
- Coordinates: 28°34′S 58°43′W
- Country: Argentina
- Province: Corrientes
- Department: San Roque
- Elevation: 70 m (230 ft)

Population
  - Total: 10,885
- Demonym: sanroqueña/o
- Time zone: UTC−3 (ART)
- CPA base: W3448
- Dialing code: +54 3777

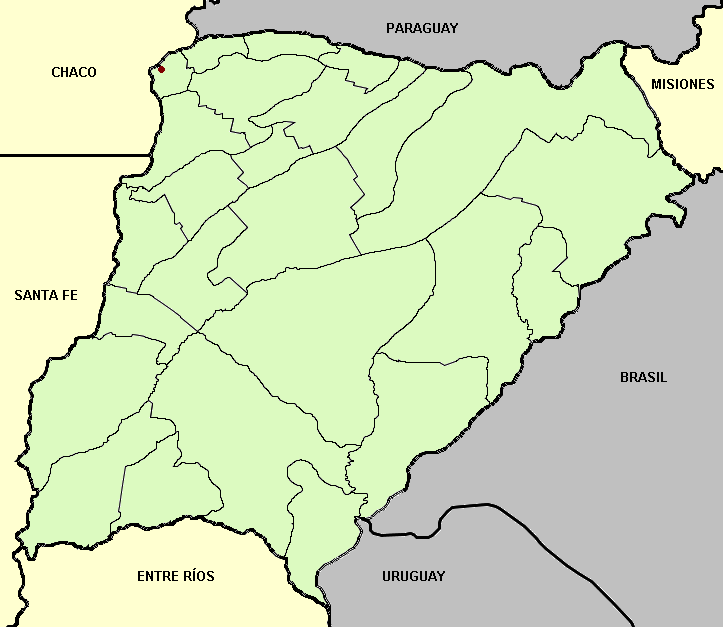
Map of Corrientes administrative division

San Roque (Guarani: Sán Rróke) is a city in Corrientes Province, Argentina. It is the head town of the San Roque Department.

The settlement was established on October 11, 1773.
