= Juan de Echevarría =

Basque-Spanish painter

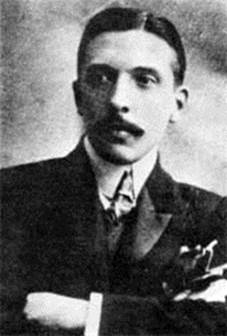
Juan de Echevarría (c.1900)

Juan de Echevarría Zuricalday or, in Basque, Juan Etxebarria Zurikaldai (14 April 1875. Bilbao - 8 June 1931, Madrid) was a Spanish painter of Basque ancestry. He is generally associated with the Fauvist movement and is known primarily for landscapes, still lifes and portraits.

== Biography ==
His father was an industrialist. He attended secondary school in Angoulême; graduating in 1887. Five years later, he went to England, where he attended Eton College, then went to the Hochschule Mittweida in Germany and earned an industrial engineering degree in 1897. After that, he toured Europe to learn more about new steel making techniques.

He worked as director of the family business for several years but, after his mother's death in 1902, he resigned to pursue painting, which he had always felt was his true vocation. Shortly after, his family's company was merged with others to become Altos Hornos de Vizcaya.

He began his studies in Bilbao with Manuel Losada, then went to Paris and became involved in the Postimpressionist movement. He also attended the Académie Julian and took private lessons from the sculptor and ceramicist, Paco Durrio. In 1905, he took an extensive trip throughout Europe, then returned home.

Rather than show his paintings at the National Exhibition of Fine Arts, he had his first major showing in 1911 at the Salon d'Automne, where he displayed works in a variety of new styles and caught the attention of the poet Guillaume Apollinaire, who was also a noted art critic.

After an extended stay in Granada, he spent some time in Ávila, then presented his works in an exhibition at the Ateneo de Madrid (1916). He settled there in 1918, participated in the creation of the Society of Basque Studies and continued to exhibit widely throughout the 1920s. He spent 1930 visiting with his friend, Miguel de Unamuno, who had been exiled to Hendaye.

Immediately after his death, a major retrospective was held in Paris at the Marcel Barheim gallery. Numerous others have been held throughout Spain; in 1949, 1955, 1961, 1965 and 1978.

== Selected paintings ==
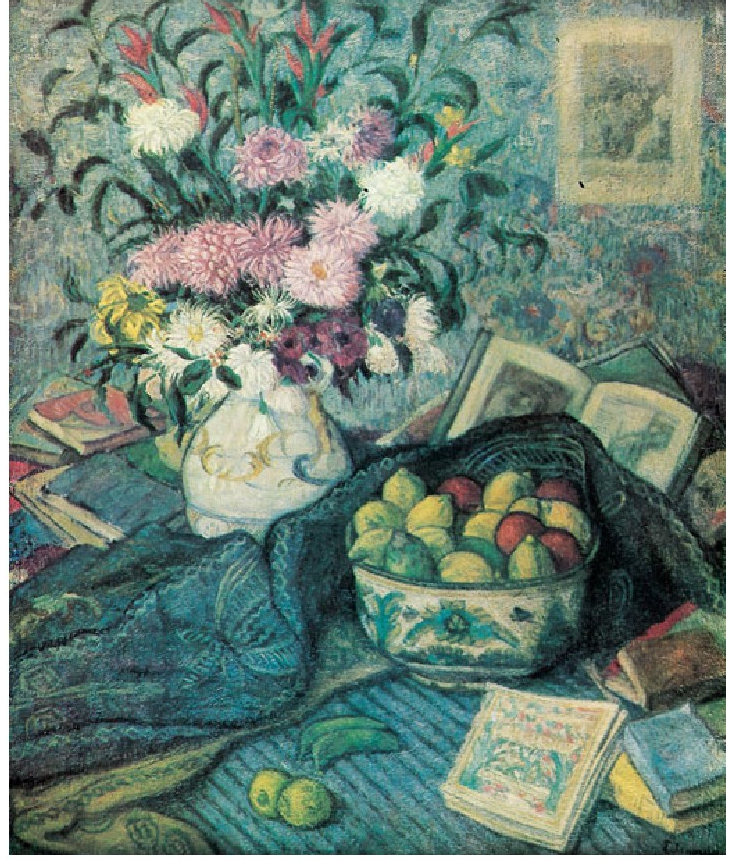
Flowers with Bananas, Lemons and Books

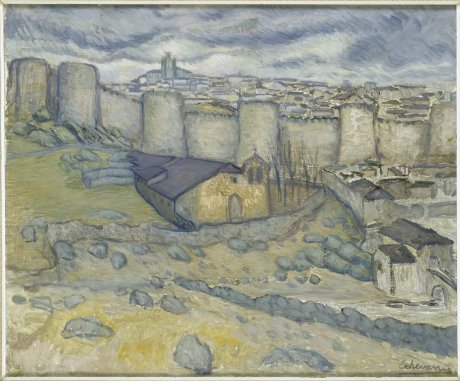
View of Ávila

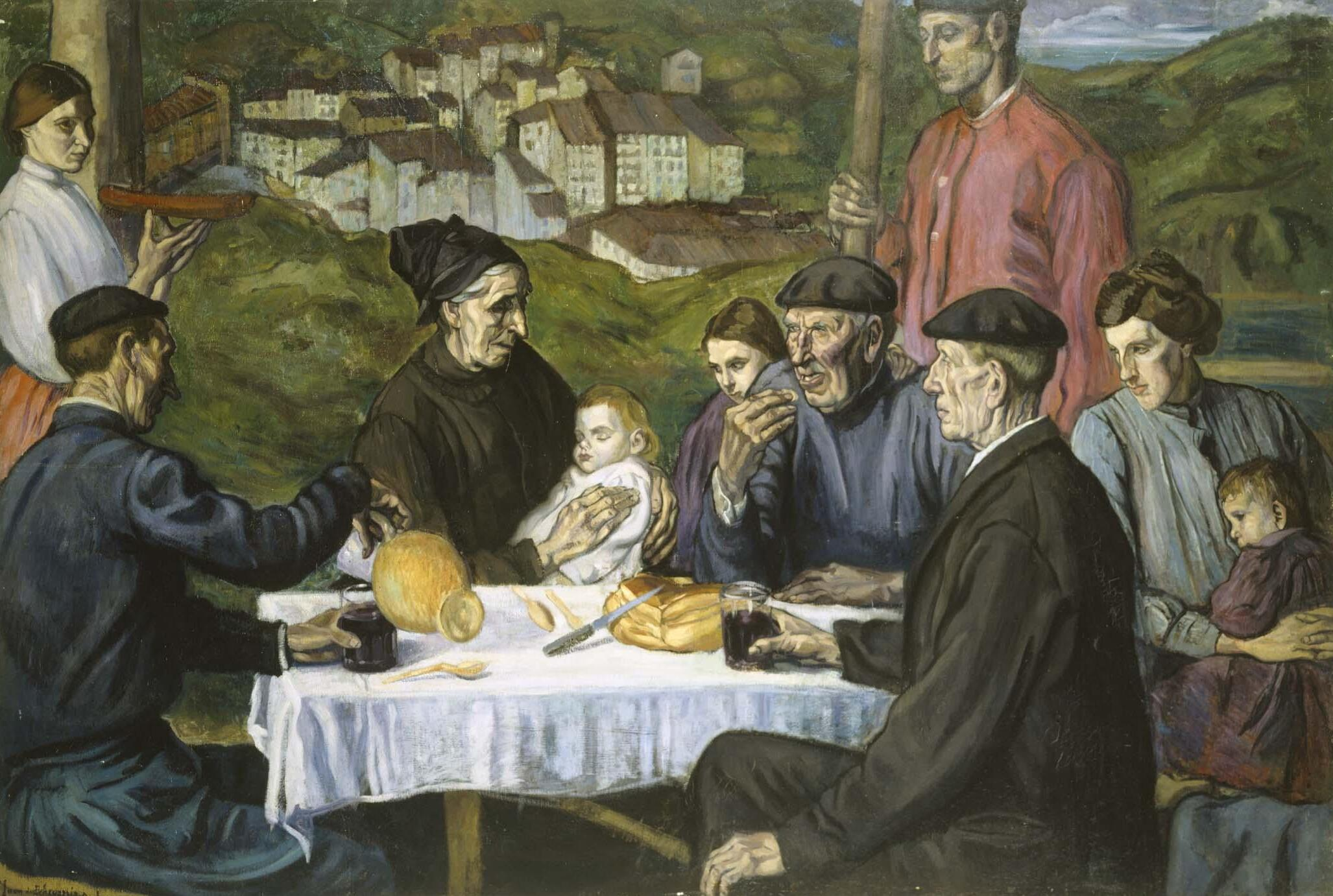
Afternoon Tea in Ondárroa

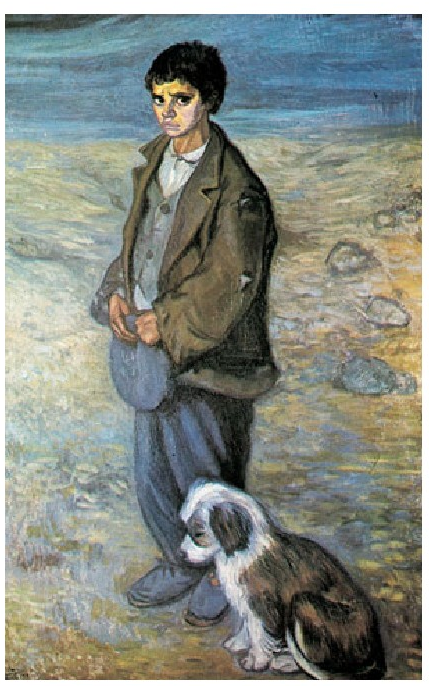
The Spanish Outcast

== Collection ==
- Museo Reina Sofia
