= Jesús María Echavarría Aguirre =

Venerable Bishop Jesús María Echavarría Aguirre
- Bishop of Saltillo
- Church: Roman Catholic Church
- Diocese: Saltillo
- See: Saltillo
- Appointed: 16 December 1904
- Installed: 27 March 1905
- Term ended: 5 April 1954
- Predecessor: José María de Jesús Portugal Serratos
- Successor: Luis Guízar Barragán

Orders
- Ordination: 18 October 1886 by José de Jesús María Uriarte Pérez
- Consecration: 12 February 1905 by José María de Jesús Portugal Serratos
- Rank: Bishop

Personal details
- Born: Jesús María Echavarría Aguirre; 6 July 1858 Bacubirito, Sinaloa, Mexico
- Died: 5 April 1954 (aged 95) Saltillo, Coahuila, Mexico
- Motto: Amor meus spes mea ("My love, my hope")

Sainthood
- Feast day: 5 April
- Venerated in: Roman Catholic Church
- Title as Saint: Venerable
- Attributes: Episcopal attire
- Patronage: Guadalupan Catechists Sisters

Jesús María Echavarría Aguirre (6 July 1858 – 5 April 1954) was a Mexican Roman Catholic prelate who served as the Bishop of Saltillo from 1904 until his death. He was also the founder of the Guadalupan Catechists Sisters. He was an ardent devotee to the Mother of God and attentive to the needs of local parishes; his pastoral mission consisted of improving parish conditions and focusing on alleviating the plight of the poor in his diocese.

The beatification cause opened under Pope John Paul II on 7 December 1990 and he was titled as a Servant of God while the confirmation of his heroic virtue in 2014 allowed for Pope Francis to name him as Venerable.

== Life ==
Jesús María Echavarría Aguirre was born in Mexico on 6 July 1858 as the first of twelve children to Don Ignacio Echavarría Yañez (9 May 1831 - 7 August 1904) and Doña María del Refugio Aguirre Rochín (26 May 1841 - 3 April 1919); the two married in 1857. His baptism was celebrated on 18 July in the local parish church in which he received the names of "José María Francisco Romulo de Jesús". His siblings were:

- María del Rosario (1862-1939)
- María del Refugio (1866-1946)
- Luz (1864-1908)
- Aurelia (1868-1946) (who lived with her bishop brother for a brief period)
- Ascensión (1870-1945)
- María Antonia (1872-1916)
- Francisco (1873-1954)
- José Vicente (d. 1939) (never married)
- Guillermo (1876-1914)
- María (1884-1956)
- Ranulfo (1881-1904)

His father died in August 1904 and his brother Ranulfo followed not long after.

On 3 December 1902 he was made the vicar-general for the Sinaloa diocese and made rector of seminarians at Culiacan on 23 November 1895. Echavarría was later appointed as the vicar of the Culiacan cathedral; in 1890 he set in motion the construction of the Shrine of the Sacred Heart of Jesus of Culiacan. In 1904 he moved to Guadalajara to undergo the spiritual exercises that the Jesuits led. Pope Pius X - on 16 December 1904 - appointed him as the Bishop of Saltillo; he received his episcopal consecration (in the Saltillo cathedral) and was installed in his new diocese both in 1905. On 2 April 1905 the new bishop sent his first circular letter to all priests asking for detailed reports on the status and conditions of each parish and sent a second on 15 May 1905 encouraging all priests to devote themselves to catechetical programmes. He founded a new educational institution for seminarians on 30 October 1905. In 1923 he founded the Guadalupan Catechists Sisters.

The bishop left Mexico for political reasons on two separate occasions and left for the first time on 27 April 1914 and returned later on 2 May 1918 and spent a brief period of that time in Havana. He also moved to places in the United States of America such as Florida and New Orleans. Echavarría also left in a second exile from 21 April 1927 to 2 July 1929 and travelled to both Utah and California.

He died on 5 April 1954 at 3:00pm and his remains interred in the cathedral.

== Beatification process ==
The beatification cause opened in a diocesan process in Saltillo and spanned from 12 February 1987 until its closure just under a decade later on 19 August 1995; he became titled as a Servant of God under Pope John Paul II after the Congregation for the Causes of Saints issued the official "nihil obstat" to the cause. The C.C.S. later validated the process in Rome on 23 November 1995 and received the Positio dossier in 2001 from the postulation.

Theologians approved the dossier's contents on 5 November 2010 as did the C.C.S. members on 4 February 2014; Pope Francis titled Echavarría as Venerable on 7 February 2014 after confirming that the late bishop lived a life of model heroic virtue. The process for a miracle opened in Saltillo on 28 October 1999 and closed on 5 January 2001; the C.C.S. validated this process on 11 January 2002.

The current postulator for this cause is Dr. Silvia Mónica Correale.
