= Itagüí station =

Medellín metro station

Coordinates: 6.1629°N 75.6067°W

Itagüí Estación Itagüí
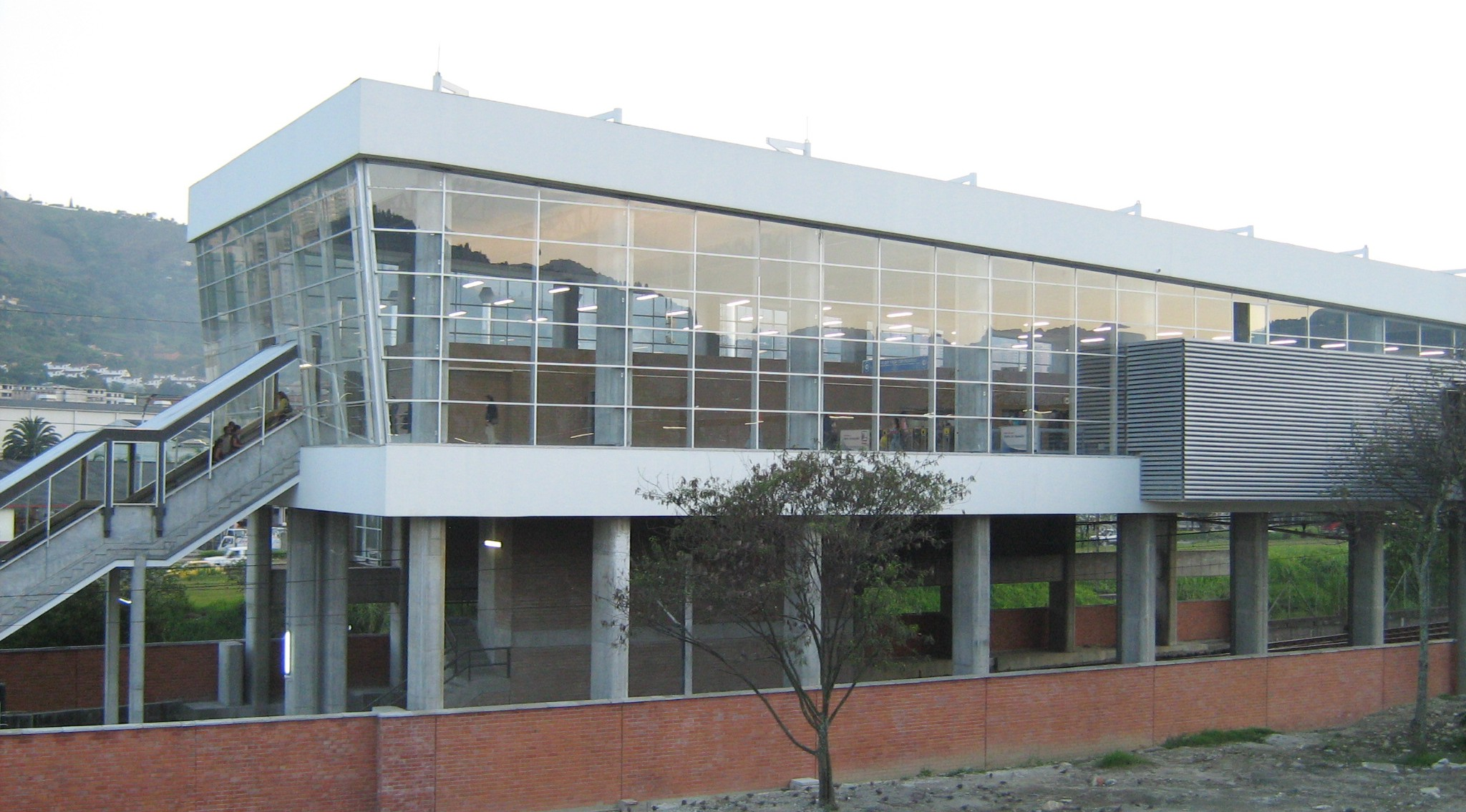

General information
- Location: Itagüí; Colombia

History
- Opened: 17 September 2012; 13 years ago

Services
Preceding station	Medellín Metro	Following station
Envigado towards Niquía	Line A	Sabaneta towards La Estrella
Location

Itagüí is a station on line A of the Medellín Metro going south. It is named after the city where it is located, Itagüí. The station was opened on 30 September 1996 as the terminus of the extension of the line from Poblado. On 17 September 2012, the line was extended to La Estrella.

In 2012, the second expansion of line A took place. Before the second expansion of the Medellín Metro, this was a terminal station for line A.
