= Etxeberria =

Origin
- Language: Basque
- Meaning: "The new house"
- Region of origin: Basque Country (Spain, France)

Other names
- Variant forms: Echeverria, Echevarria, Etcheverria, Echeverri, Echeverry, Hechavarria, Cheverie

Etxeberria (Basque pronunciation: [etʃeβeri.a], modern Basque spelling) is a Basque language placename and surname from the Basque Country in Spain and France, meaning 'the new house'. It shows one meaningful variant, Etxeberri (no Basque article –a, 'the'), and a number of later spelling variants produced in Spanish and other languages. Etxebarri(a) is a western Basque dialectal variant, with the same etymology. Etxarri (Echarri) is attested as stemming from Etxaberri.

Historically, the surname was often associated with the construction of new farms (baserri) after the introduction of New World crops like maize and potatoes. In many Basque areas, the surname Etxeberri(a) was formerly associated to the naturalized Roma people, while in the French Basque Country it was sometimes translated to Gascon Casenave/Cazenave.

== Spellings and dialectal distribution ==
Etxebarri(a) variants hail from Biscay, most of northern Álava, and western Gipuzkoa, while the Etxeberri(a) (Echeberri(a), Echeberry(a)) are based in the eastern tip of Álava, rest of Gipuzkoa, Navarre, and French Basque Country. The termination –a stands for the article, 'the', sometimes missing. As for the spellings, the v/b alternation doesn't reflect any allophones, but different writing styles and conventions. The Etcheverry or Echeverri type of spelling typically hails from the French Basque Country, while the Echeverría type shows a Spanish spelling. However, adaptations and distortions of original forms taking place during emigration to America added to the confusion. Etxeberri(a) denotes influence of the spelling rules developed by Sabino Arana for the Basque language as of the late 19th century.

Some cognate forms resulting from dialectal distribution and adaptation to other languages are:

- Etchevery, Etcheverry, Echeverri, Echeverría, Echeberria, Cheberri, Cheberry, Etxeberry, D'Etcheverry, Detcheverry, Decheverry
- Etxebarri, Etxebarria, Echebarría, Echevarría, Chávarri, Chavarria, Hechavarria, Echavarria
- Etxeber, Echeber
- Xavier, Xabier
- Etxeberre, Echeberre
- Txiberri, Chiberri, Iberri
- Etxeberrieta, Etxebarrieta
- Hechavarría

== Origin ==
The Biscayne branch of the Echevarría family is thought to have originated in the town of Dima, it grew to the neighbouring town of Zeanuri, and eventually spread to the nearby city of Vitoria-Gasteiz. However, it is too widespread a place-name to pinpoint just one location. Another branch of Echebarria hails from Durango and Zaldibar (Biscay).

An Echeberria branch originated in Sorabilla (Andoain) and extended its roots to many other towns across Gipuzkoa. Another one is from Amezketa, stretching out its roots to a large number of villages and towns in the province. It further expanded to Santander, and on to Seville and Chile. Another branch originated in different spots of Baztan, Baigorri, and Leitza (northern Navarre), expanding later to the south of Navarre: Pamplona, Estella-Lizarra, Tudela, etc.

The Echeberri form hails from Ezkio, Oñati, Hondarribia, Hendaye (the branch expanded out to Colombia), Oiartzun, San Sebastián, etc. "Echeberry" is typically from the town of Tolosa (Gipuzkoa), attested in 1346.

== Notable people ==
- Joseba Etxeberria (b. 1977), football player for Athletic Bilbao and Spain
- Imanol Etxeberria (b. 1973), football player for Athletic Bilbao
- Eloína Echevarría (1961–2025), Cuban long jumper and triple jumper
- Luis Echeverría Álvarez (1922–2022), president of Mexico, 1970–76
- Esteban Echeverría (1805–1851), 19th century writer and political activist from Argentina
- Liza Echeverría (b. 1972), Mexican actress and model
- Sandra Echeverría (b. 1981), Mexican actress and singer
- Atanasio Echeverría y Godoy, 18th century Mexican botanical artist and naturalist
- Francisco de Borja Echeverría (1848–1904), a Chilean Conservative Party deputy and diplomat
- Bernardino Echeverría Ruiz (1912–2000), a Roman Catholic Cardinal
- Rob Echeverria, former member of American rock band Biohazard
- Star Bonifacio Echeverria, Spanish manufacturer of small arms
- Andrea Echeverri (born 1965), pop singer
- Juan Carlos Echeverry, opera singer
- Adeiny Hechavarria, American baseball player
- Ignacio Echevarría (b. 1960), a Spanish literary critic and editor
- Andy Etchebarren (1943–2019), American baseball player
- Sam Etcheverry (1930–2009), American and Canadian football player
- Pedro Echevarria, Host/Producer, C-SPAN
- Marco Etcheverry, Bolivian footballer
- Tomás Martín Etcheverry (b. 1999), Argentine tennis player

Institutions

- Banco Etcheverría, a former Spanish bank

== Places ==
It is a widespread place-name across the whole Basque Country and showing similar Romanized variants in Aragon. It refers to baserris, neighbourhoods, villages, and towns:

- Etxeberri, Arakil, a village in Navarre, Spain

== See also ==
- Javier (name)
- Echevarria (disambiguation)

== General and cited references ==
- Michelena, L. (1997). Apellidos vascos (5th edition). Txertoa.
