= El Poblado =

El Poblado Comuna n°14 El Poblado El Poblado
- Commune
- El Poblado Commune
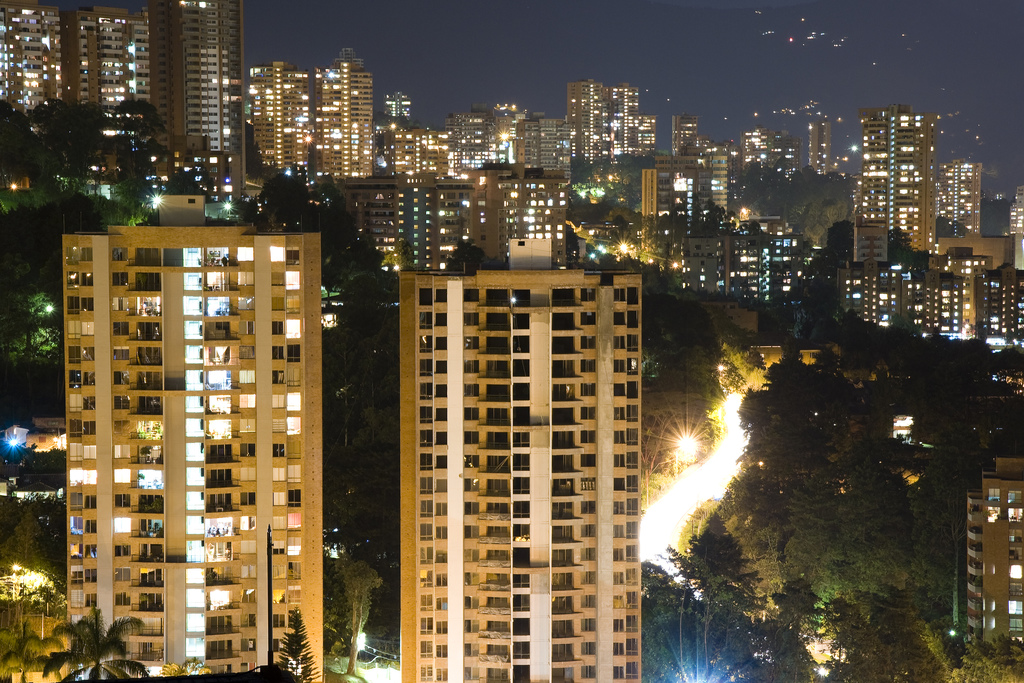
- Nickname: Las Manzanas de Oro (The Golden Apples)
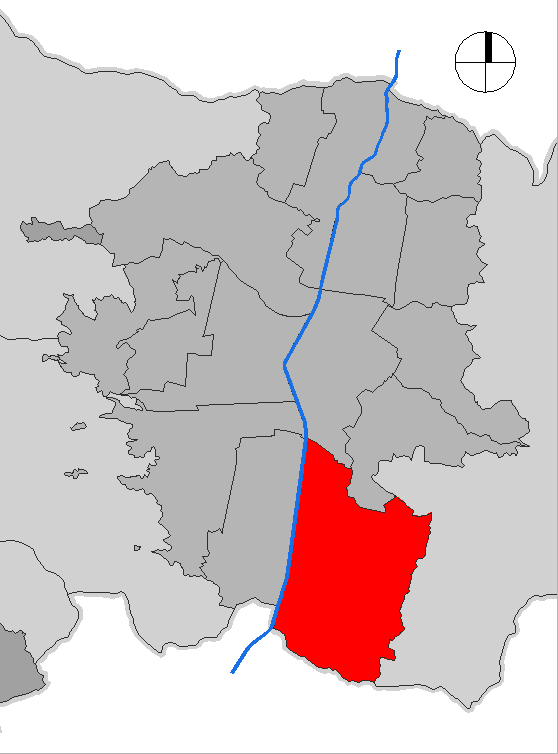
- Location of El Poblado in Medellín shown in red.
- Coordinates: 6°14′9.33″N 75°34′30.49″W
- Urban commune: Medellín Commune n°14
- Settled: 1616

Area
  - Total: 23.0 km^{2} (8.89 sq mi)
  - Land: 14.3200 km^{2} (5.52898 sq mi)
- Elevation: 1,495 m (4,905 ft)

Population (2015)
  - Total: 128,839
  - Density: 8,997/km^{2} (23,302/sq mi)
- Postal code: Medellín 17001000
- HDI (2006): ▼0.937 Very High
- Website: medellin.gov.co

El Poblado is the 14th commune in the metropolitan area of the city of Medellín, Colombia. According to a 2005 census the population was 94,704, distributed among its land area of 23 km^{2}, and by the year 2015, it had a population of 128,839. The comuna consists of 24 barrios, and is located in the south-east of the city. Its western boundary with the comuna of Guayabal runs along the Medellín River; to the south, it borders the city of Envigado, to the east, the township of Santa Elena, and to the north, the comunas of La Candelaria and Buenos Aires.

El Poblado is also known as Las Manzanas de Oro (The Golden Apples) because it is the main center of the industrial and commercial life of the second largest economy of Colombia.

The name El Poblado (The Village) derives from the first Spanish settlement of the Aburrá Valley in 1616 that was built in what is today its main square. In 1675, the Spanish administration founded another village in El Sitio de Aná (The Aná Place), today's Berrío Square, designed to become the center of the future Medellín; instead, El Poblado itself became the main economic center during the 20th century.

== History ==
The Spanish explorer Francisco Herrera y Campuzano established the first European settlement in the Aburrá Valley, in what is today El Poblado Square, by a royal edict of March 2, 1616. The new village, called San Lorenzo de Aburrá had a population of 80 indigenous people. A later edict stated that indigenous people, white and mestizos, could not live together, and by 1675, the Spanish administration moved the center to a new village in what is today the Berrio Square. El Poblado became a marginalized township until the 20th century.

In 1845, the parish was given the name San José del Poblado and had a plaza, streets and land for sale. At that time the most famous fincas (estates) were Provenza, Manila, Patio Bonito, Vizcaya, Castropol and Astorga, that would remain the barrio names.

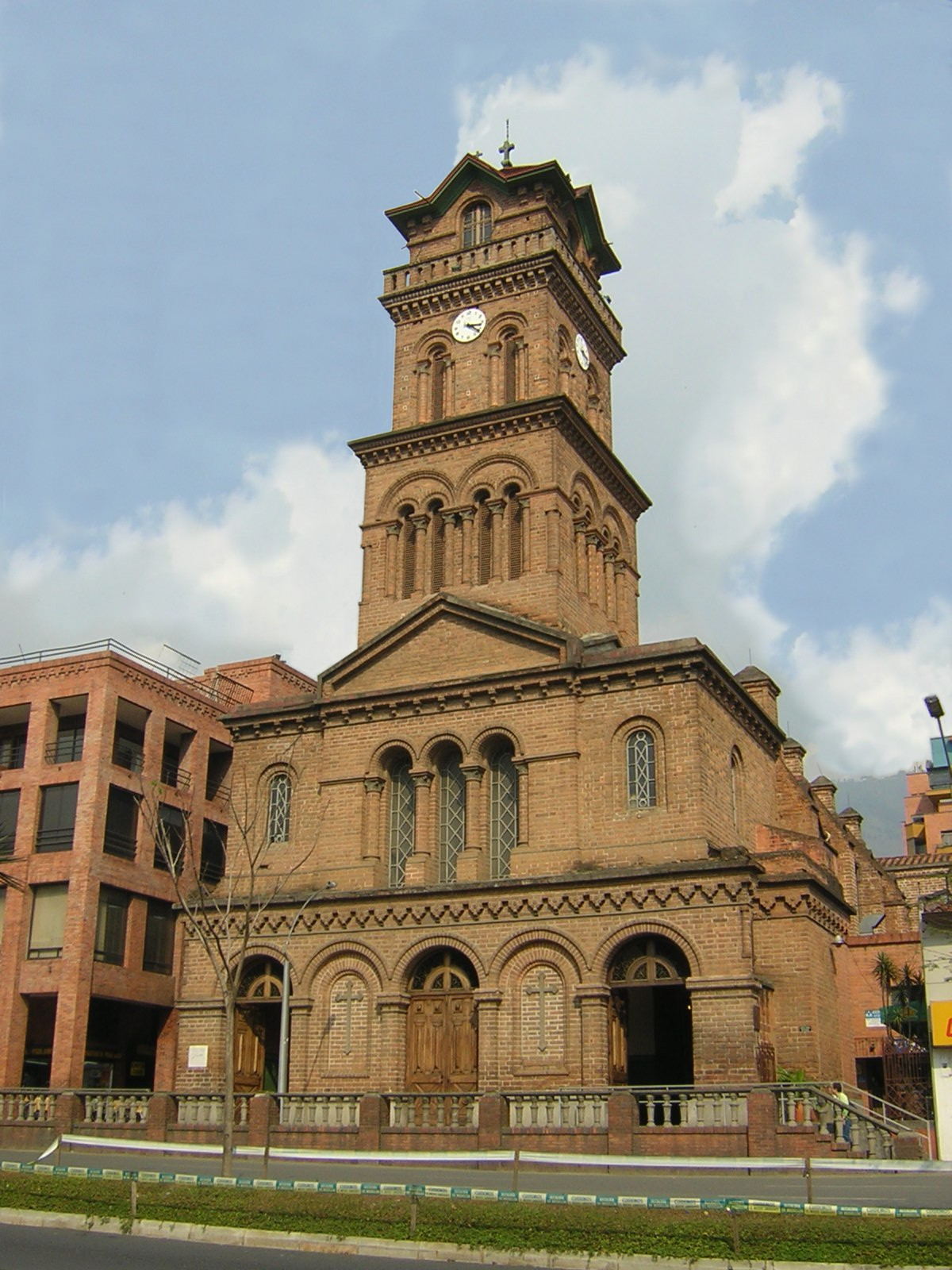
The Saint Joseph of El Poblado Church in the main square of the district marks the place where Medellín was founded in 1616.

At the beginning of the 20th century, El Poblado was the preferred area for wealthy families of the city to buy rural villas. At the time, travel between El Poblado and Medellín was difficult, but the area was attractive for the industrialists and business families that settled Barrio Prado in what is now the downtown area. With the construction of the Medellín - El Poblado Avenue, the land became valuable for urban settlements, and the villas or "fincas" were built in Envigado. During the 1930s, farming families from outlying areas came to Medellín looking for new opportunities, and were attracted by the industrialization of the city in El Poblado. This inspired the creation of a new barrio, Barrio Lleras, financed by Banco Central Hipotecario.

In the 1950s, El Poblado was included in the city due to the extension of industrial activities along the Medellín River to the south. The rich families of Barrio Prado started to move to El Poblado because La Candelaria became overpopulated and the land rose in price.

In the 1970s El Poblado became the place for Medellín's wealthy residents and was the second urban center; it was given the nickname Milla de Oro (Golden Mile) and the Zona Rosa was established – an exclusive tourist area for business, night clubs and general activities for locals and visitors.

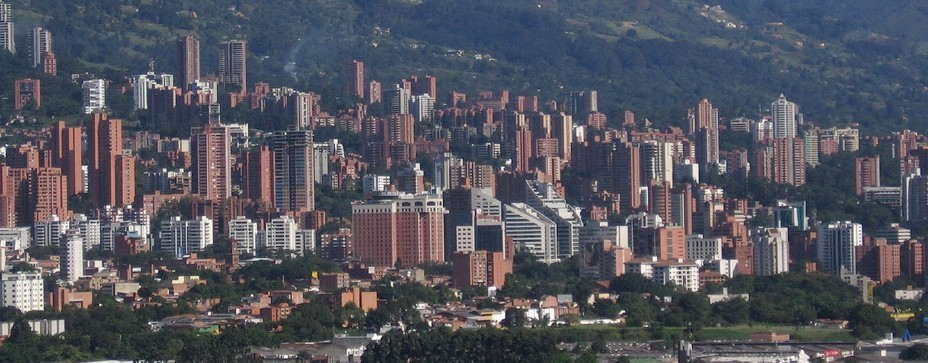
A view of El Poblado Commune.

== Geography ==
El Poblado consists of 1,432.58 hectares (3,540.0 acres), encompassing 39% of the Medellín municipality. It is located in the southeastern zone of the city towards the mountains of the Aburrá Valley. The Medellín River borders its western side, separating it from the Guayabal Commune and its elevation east of the river rises from approximately 1,538 meters (5,046 feet) above sea level to over 2,000 meters (6,600 feet) at its highest point.

Several streams descending from the eastern mountain flow into the Medellín River and pass throughout El Poblado. The most important ones are El Poblado and Aguacatala creeks.

== Demographics ==
Population by age range Commune 14 El Poblado
Range of age	No. of inhabitants	%
0 - 14	23,216	24.5
15 - 39	37,328	39.4
40 - 64	28,775	30.3
65 y más	5,385	5.6
Total	94,704	100.0

According to the 2005 Annual Medellín Statistics Report, El Poblado has a population of 94,704 inhabitants (53,561 males and 41,143 females). The age distribution is (63.9%) under age 39, (39.4%) from ages 15 to 39, and (5.6%) who were 65 or older.

In addition, another 2005 report from the Medellín municipality estimates that 66.5% of the housing in El Poblado belongs to the richest class in Colombia known as (estrato 6); 27.5% belongs to the high-middle class (estrato 5); 4.2% belongs to the middle class; 1.3% to the low-middle class and 0.5% to the poor class.

According to figures presented by the DANE census 2005, the ethnographic composition of the district is: White (78.4%), Mestizos (20%) and Afro-Colombians (1.6%).

== Neighborhoods ==
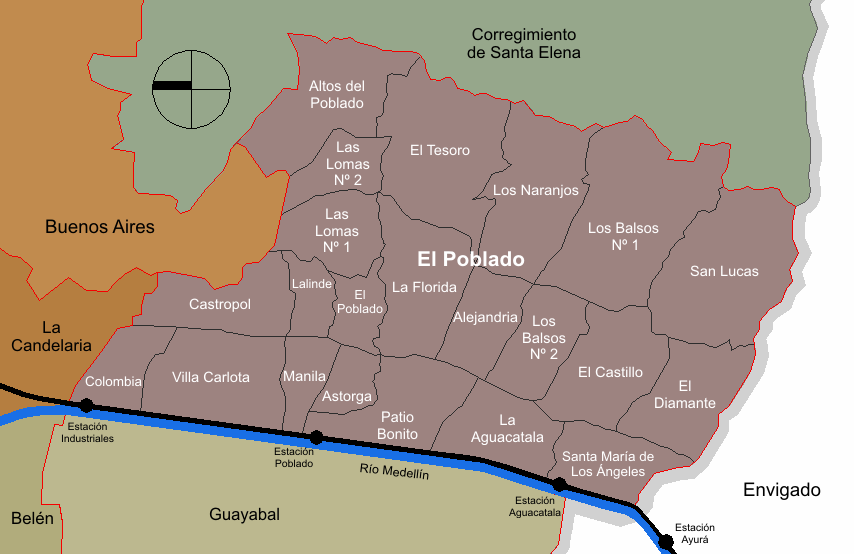
El Poblado divided by barrios.

The commune is divided into 22 "barrios" or neighborhoods:

Barrio Colombia; Villa Carlota; Castropol; Lalinde; Las Lomas No. 1; Las Lomas No. 2; Altos del Poblado; El Tesoro; Los Naranjos; Los Balsos No. 1; San Lúcas	El Diamante No. 2; El Castillo; Los Balsos No. 2; Alejandría; La Florida; El Poblado; Manila; Astorga; Patio Bonito; La Aguacatala; Santa María de Los Ángeles

== Streets and transport ==
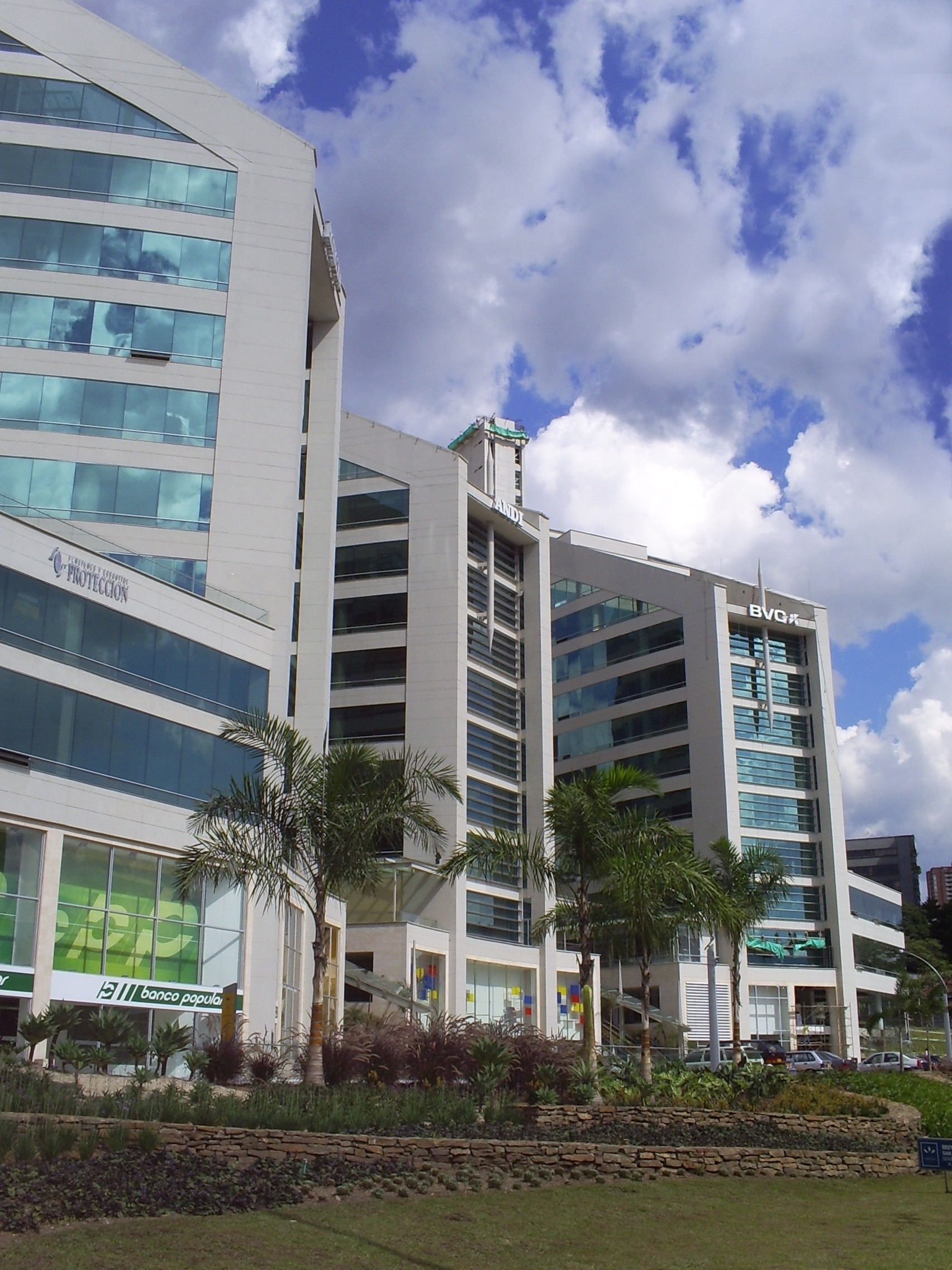
San Fernando Plaza Complex.

=== Streets ===
The main streets of the communes are oriented north to south following the direction of the Medellín River. Due to the undulating and varied relief of the area, there are many kind of streets, which are often named due to their orientation:

- Avenidas (Avenues): a major thoroughfare or main street.
- Carrera: a street that goes from north to south.
- Calle (Street): a thoroughfare that goes from east to west.
- Loma: a street that goes to a specific hill.
- Circunvalar: a street that goes around a specific area.
- Transversal: a street that is not oriented east to west.

El Poblado follows the Medellín tradition of using names for the streets, rather than numbers, though it has its own kind of numbering for its streets (calles), different from the rest of the Medellín municipality. The number of the calles (those that go from east to west) increases from south to north: Calle 1 at the south of the city and Calle 120 at its north. However, this order is reversed in El Poblado. The numbers instead increase from north to south. They are also easily distinguished by the word "sur" (south) appended to their names: Calle 1 Sur is at the northernmost part of El Poblado and Calle 10 Sur is at its southern limits.

==== El Poblado Avenue ====
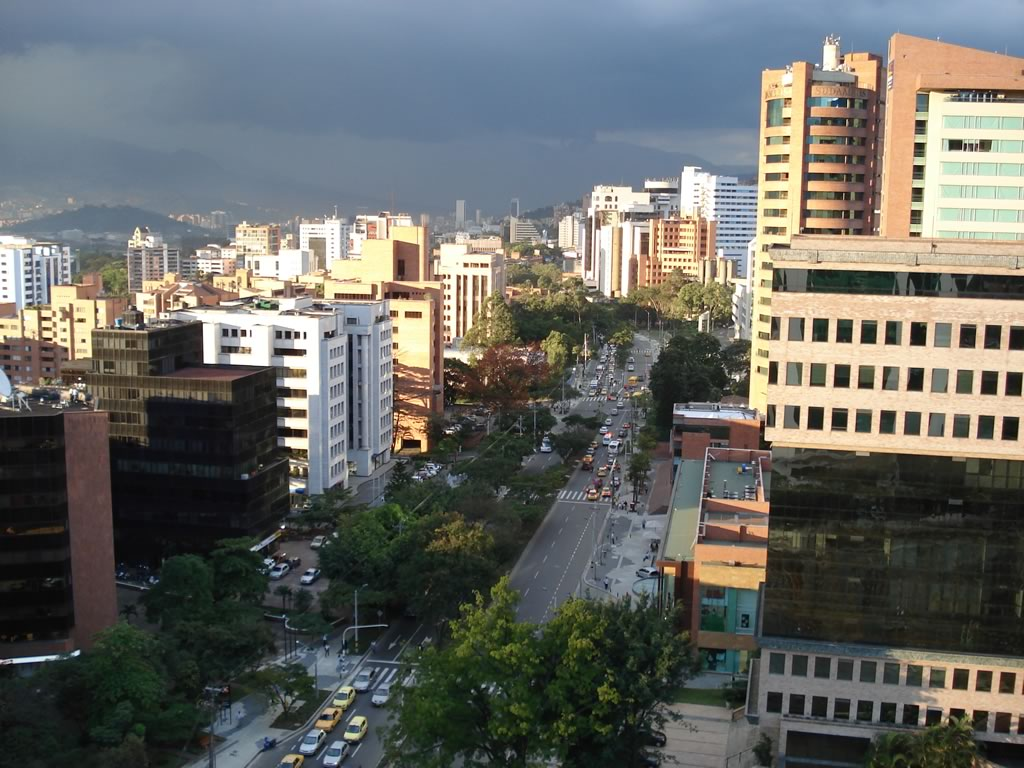
A view of El Poblado Avenue toward the north.

This is one of the main thoroughfares in Medellín, and it changes name several times as it traverses the eastern hills of the city connecting the most northern neighborhoods of Medellín like Manrique to southern Envigado. In El Poblado it starts at an intersection with the 30th Street (Calle 30) at its north and connects El Poblado to Envigado at its southern terminus. The avenue passes by El Poblado Square and Calle 10 (10th Street), which is noted for its thriving businesses and nightlife.

==== Las Vegas Avenue ====
The avenue is oriented north to south and runs along the eastern side of the Medellín River and is the urban limit of the Commune. It is also the continuation of Industrialist Avenue (Avenida los Industriales) that starts in 33rd Street finishing in 10th Street, where it becomes Las Vegas until the end of the commune in the south.

==== Las Palmas Highway ====
This is a road that connects Medellín to the near eastern region of the Antioquia State (for example to La Ceja and El Retiro). The road is also the eastern limit of the commune and has many commercial buildings, hotels, restaurants and places to view the Aburrá Valley. The road starts in the intersection of 33rd Street and El Poblado Avenue. It is a long ascent to the eastern mountain, which gives a good view of the valley. There is also a small and twisting road that goes from the center of the commune to the highway crossing and named La Cola del Zorro (The Tail of the Fox road).

==== Other important ways ====
As an alternative from going north to south through El Poblado there are two transversales (transverse streets): the Transversal Inferior (Bottom Transverse Street) and Transversal Superior (Top Transverse Street). The main streets are oriented mostly from north to south, due to the rising mountainous terrain running from west to east. The most well known west–east streets following the rising terrain to the highest area of the commune are:

- 10th Street (Calle 10)
- 14th Street (Calle 14)
- 5th South Street (Calle 5Sur)
- Los Balsos Hill Street (Loma de los Balsos)

The commune is connected to the Guayabal Commune in the west by four bridges crossing the Medellín River in the following streets:

- 37th Street.
- 29th Street.
- 10th Street.
- 12th South Street.

=== Metro de Medellín ===
The Metro of Medellín has three stations in the city of El Poblado along the 1st Line going from north to south through the Industriales and Las Vegas Avenue.

- El Poblado Station on the cross of Las Vegas Avenue and 10th Street. It is also near to the bridge of 10th Street that connects with Guayabal Commune.
- Aguacatala Station near 12th South Street.
- Ayurá Station, the last Metro station within the municipality of Medellín.

=== Buses ===
Five bus lines provide service to El Poblado from downtown Medellín:

- The Poblado 130.
- The Poblado 131 Barrio Colombia.
- The Poblado-Exito 132.
- The Poblado-San Lucas 133.
- The Poblado Intercontinental-Las Lomas 134.

The buses from Medellín to the towns of Envigado and Sabaneta also run through El Poblado.

=== Metroplús ===
The Metroplus is a new transportation project in Medellín that will integrate the current subway stations to different sectors of the city. In the case of El Poblado, the Metroplus will provide service from the Industriales Station near El Poblado Avenue to Zúñiga Creek. It will have 12 stations.

== Squares and malls ==
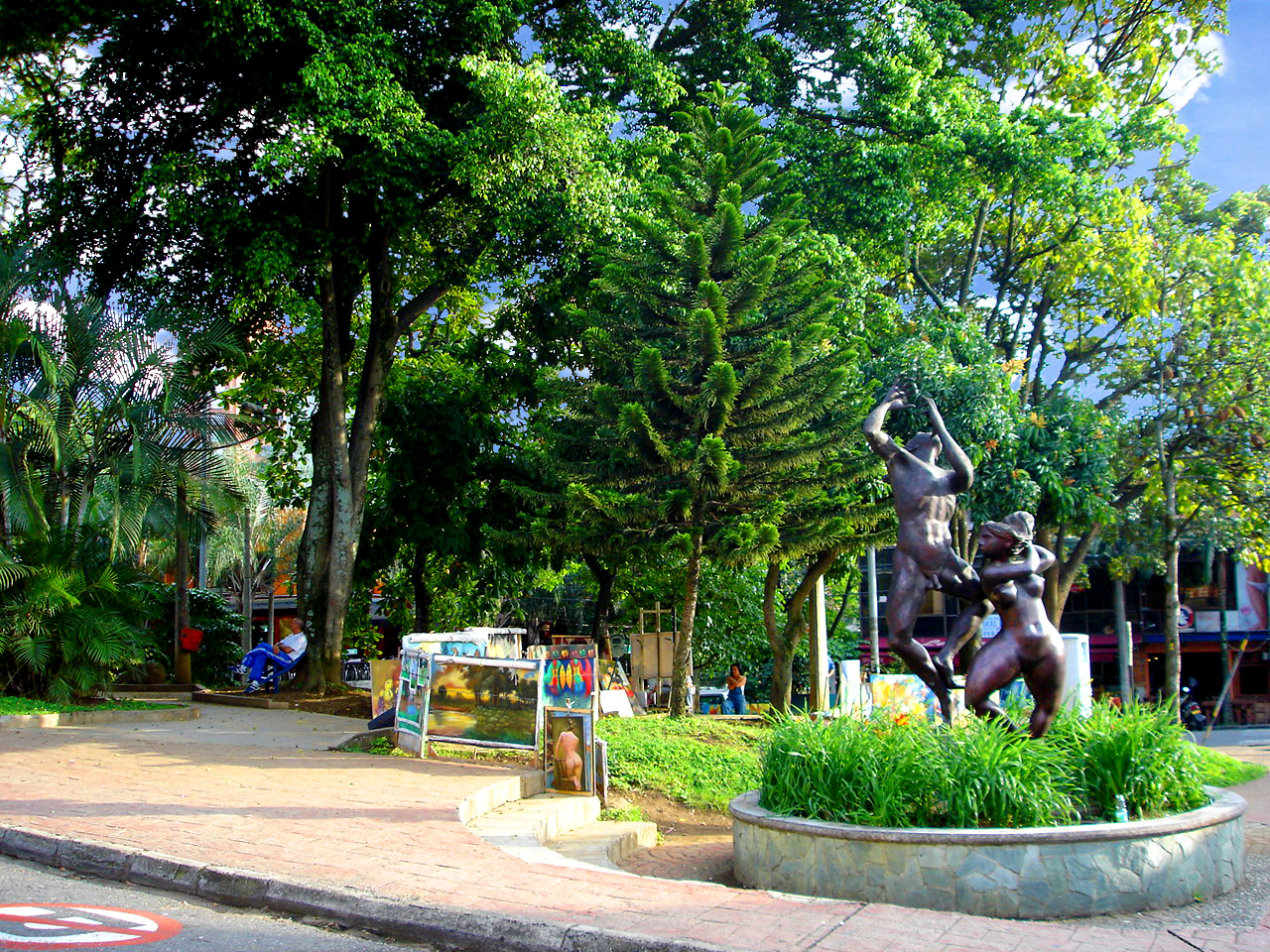
The Lleras Park.

El Poblado contains some of the more well known squares and malls of Medellín.

- El Poblado Square: The main square that is important for being the exact spot where the Spaniards founded the first European settlement in the Aburrá Valley in 1616 and it is considered the first seed of Medellín. There are no remains of that time however. The square is a very traditional Antioquian square that follows the Spaniard architecture with the main building being the Saint Joseph Church (Iglesia San José del Poblado). The square is on the intersection of El Poblado Avenue and 10th Street, this last one a preferred place by young people because its nightlife.
- The Lleras Park: Located between the 9th and 10th Streets and the 35th and 38th carreras. It is also known as Zona Rosa which in Latin America means a place of nightlife, restaurants, discos, youth gatherings and other kinds of recreation.

As a commercial city the Medellín malls are considered amongst the best in Colombia and the ones in El Poblado lead the way. Some of the more important malls are:

- El Tesoro Commercial Park
- Oviedo Shopping Mall: Located in the Golden Mile (Milla de Oro)
- Santafé Shopping Mall: Located in the Golden Mile (Milla de Oro)
- San Diego Shopping Mall
- Vizcaya Shopping Mall
- Premium Plaza Shopping Mall

== Education ==
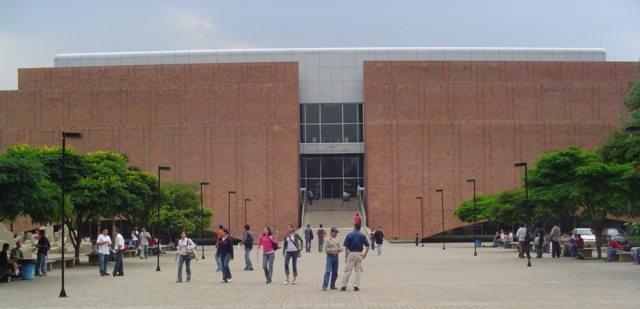
The library of Eafit University.

The commune has the highest level of education of the city with several private and government-owned schools and colleges.

- Universidad EAFIT: Located on Las Vegas Avenue and has a high reputation nationally and internationally. It was established in 1960 as a college for administrative business, finance and industrial formation for national development. In 2004 it was declared by the same administration as "Park University" as an ecological proposal for the city.
- Universidad CES: Located in the Transversal Superior near Calle 10. It started in 1979 as Instituto Ciencias de la Salud (Institute for Health Sciences) but has since expanded and now has several schools: School of Medicine, School of Dentistry, School of Veterinary and Zootechnics, Law School, School of Psychology and School of Biomedical Engineering (in association with Escuela de Ingeniería de Antioquia). It has a high reputation within the country and internationally.
- Jaime Isaza Cadavid Polytechnic: Located next to Eafit University this government-owned polytechnic was founded in 1964 and offers professional and technical education.
- INEM José Félix de Restrepo: A government-owned high school that is one of the biggest in the city and attended by youths from many other barrios of Medellín.

Other private schools located in El Poblado:

- Marymount School
- Gimnasio Los Pinares
- Lord College
- El Palermo
- San José de Las Vegas
- New School
- Compañia de María La Enseñanza
- Montessori School
- Euskadi School
- Fontán School
- Gimnasio Los Cedros

== El Castillo Museum ==
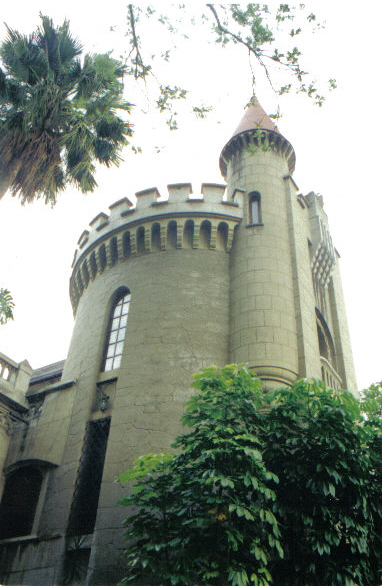
El Castillo Museum

One of the more well known museums of Medellín is El Castillo Museum, and it is located in El Poblado. Built in 1930 by architect Nel Rodríguez, it was designed in the gothic medieval style inspired by the castles of Loire, France. It is known for its French gardens, libraries, concert hall, and space for temporary art exhibits.

Its first resident was José Tobón Uribe, who had initially brought the architecture plans from France. He lived there until 1943 when business man Diego Echavarría Misas purchased the property as a family residence. In 1971, Echavarria Misas donated the castle to the City of Medellin as a museum.

== See also ==
- San José de la Salle school Medellín
