= Juan Carlos Echeverry (singer) =

Colombian operatic tenor

Juan Carlos Echeverry Bernal is a Colombian operatic tenor. He was born in Manizales, Colombia.

== Education and profession ==
He began singing at the age of five in the children's choir of his native city Manizales, while also learning the piano. Later he studied Piano and voice at the University of the Andes, Colombia (Universidad de los Andes), in Bogotá then at the Musikhochschule in Mannheim, Germany, where he was also studying vocal technique. In 1997 he continued his vocal training at the Conservatory of Cologne (Hochschule für Musik Köln), a large European music school, in the class of Professor Klesie Kelly. He received his degree with honours in July 2000. A few weeks later, he was selected to enter the Paris Opera Young Artist Program, where he remained engaged for three years.

There he took part in master classes of singers like Renata Scotto, Christa Ludwig, Teresa Berganza, Ileana Cotrubas and sung roles in the Magic Flute (Tamino), Carmen (Remendado), The Barber of Seville (Almaviva), Gianni Schicchi (Rinuccio), among others. In the autumn 2008 in Paris, and then on tour for almost two years, he was Tony Candolino in the play "Master class - Maria Callas". Playing opposite famous actress Marie Laforêt, while also singing Puccini. He has performed in France, Spain, Germany, Switzerland, Greece, Holland, Colombia and Uruguay in a variety of recitals and operas such as: Petr Eben, Anita Baldi, Vanja and Vicente Pradal La Traviata, Cosi fan tutte, Don Giovanni, Don Pasquale, The Abduction of the Serail.

== Sources ==
- "El tenor colombiano Juan Carlos Echeverry deslumbró en la Opera de la Bastilla", El Tiempo, 17 February 2004
