= Carlos Gardel (Buenos Aires Underground) =

Buenos Aires Underground station

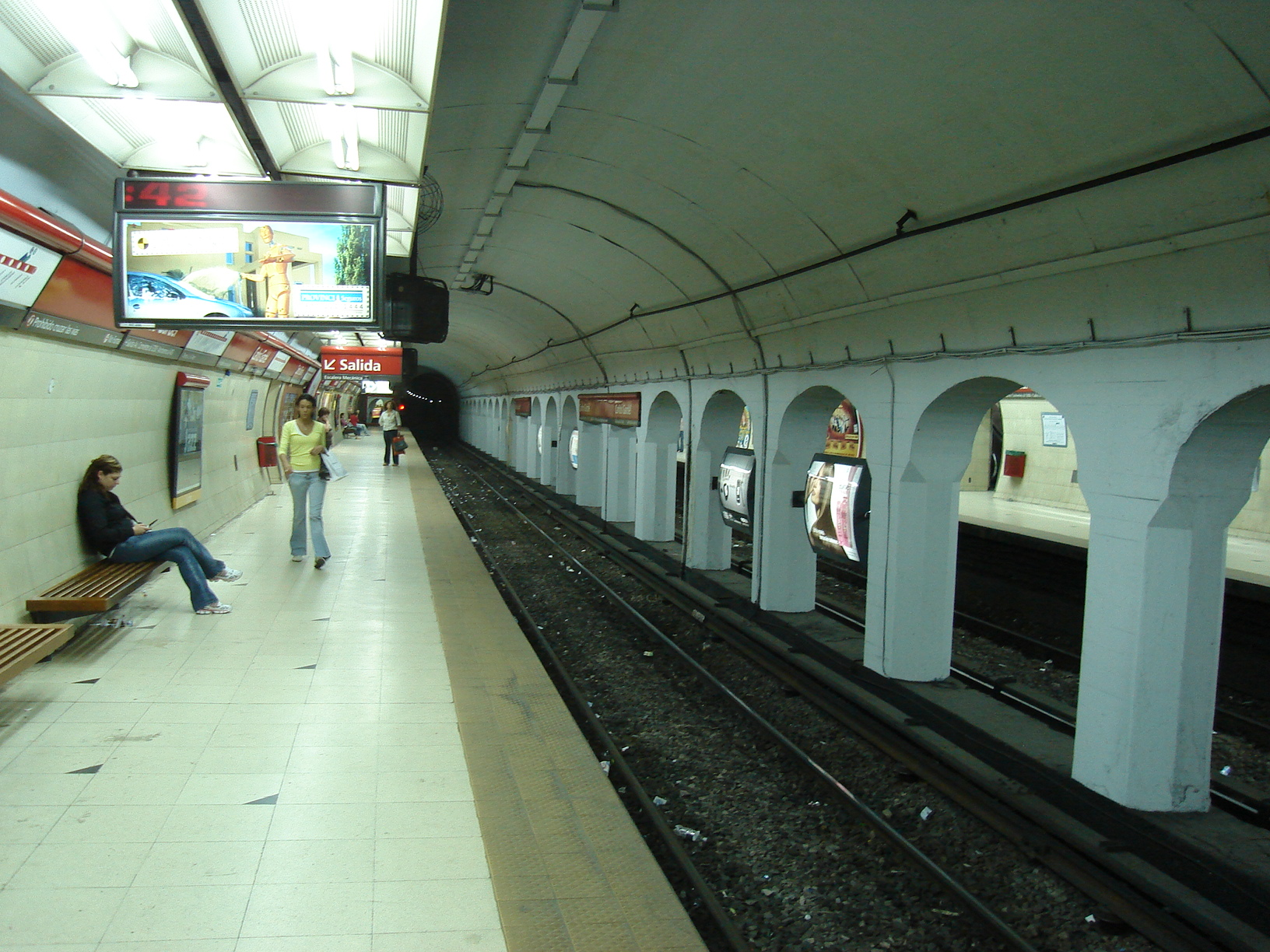

General information
- Location: Corrientes and Agüero
- Coordinates: 34°36′14.7″S 58°24′42.1″W
- Platforms: Side platforms

History
- Opened: 17 October 1930

Services
| Preceding station | Buenos Aires Underground | Following station |
|---|---|---|
| Medrano towards Juan Manuel de Rosas | Line B | Pueyrredón towards Leandro N. Alem |
Location

Carlos Gardel is a station on Line B of the Buenos Aires Underground.

The station is located in the Balvanera barrio, at the intersection of Avenida Corrientes and Calle Agüero. It was opened on 17 October 1930 as part of the inaugural section of the line between Federico Lacroze and Callao.

== Overview ==
Carlos Gardel station runs under the Abasto de Buenos Aires, one of Buenos Aires' most prominent landmarks. There is an underground connection that makes it possible to access the shopping centre from the subway station without going outside to street level.

Although initially when this station was first opened in 1930 it was named Agüero after the road it crosses, it was later renamed Carlos Gardel, after the famous tango singer. He was known as "El Morocho del Abasto" (The Brunette boy from Abasto).

The station was reopened in 2025 after a renovation.

== Gallery ==
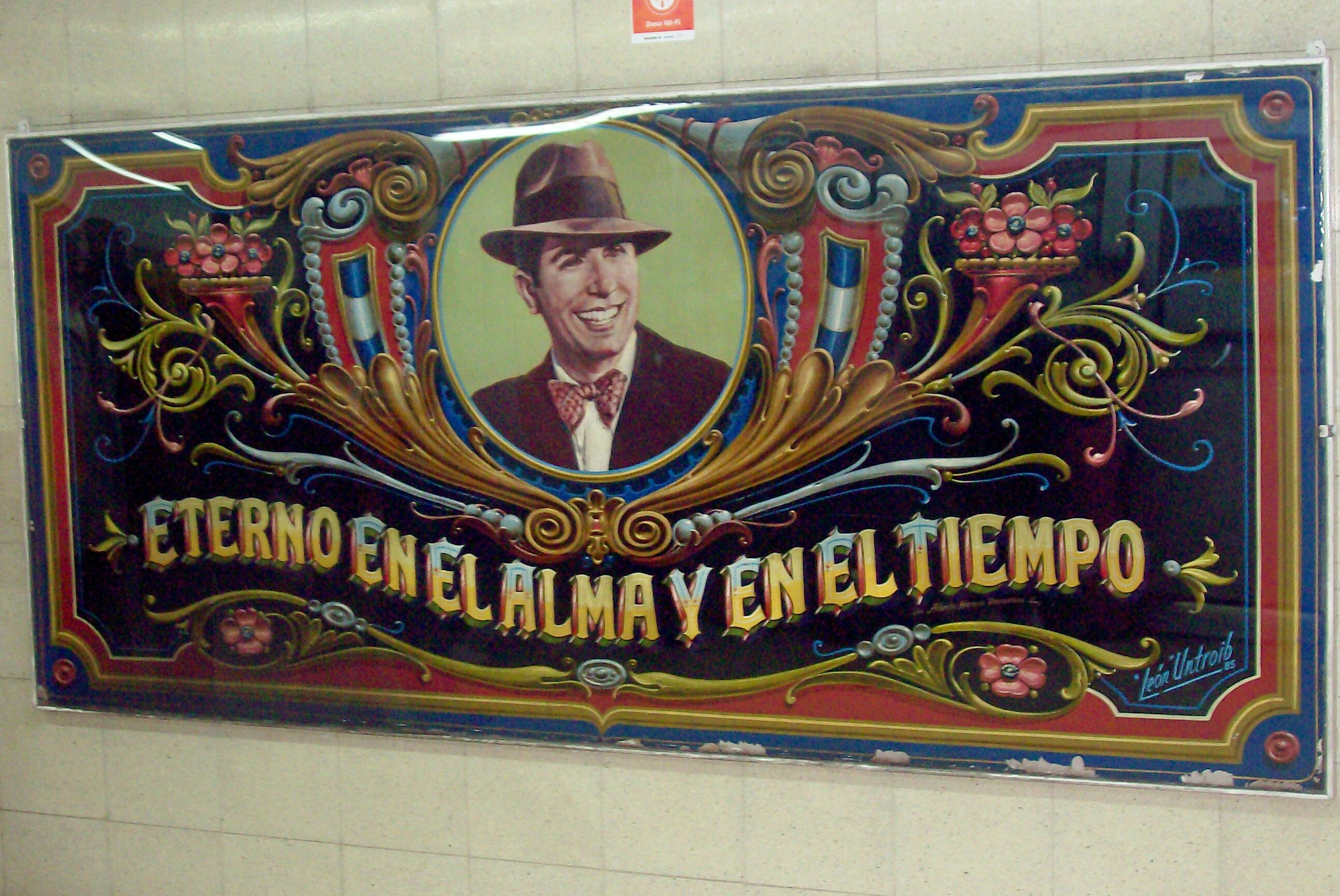
Fileteado-style portrait of Carlos Gardel located opposite the ticket counter

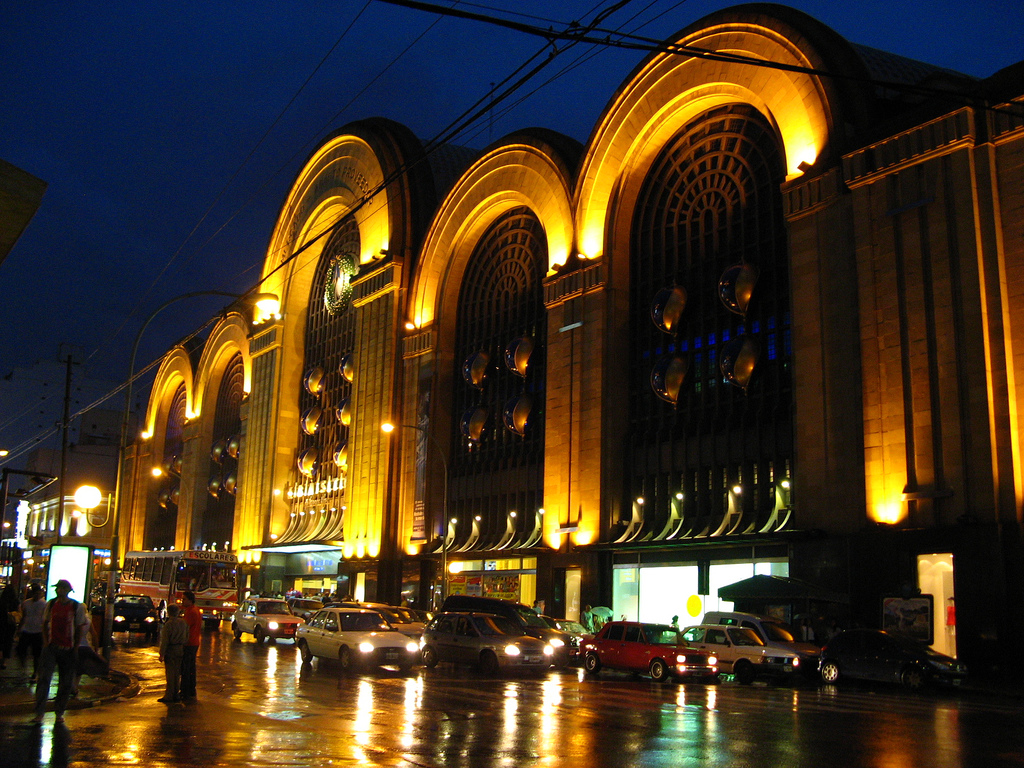
Carlos Gardel station is located under the Abasto de Buenos Aires, one of Buenos Aires' most prominent landmarks

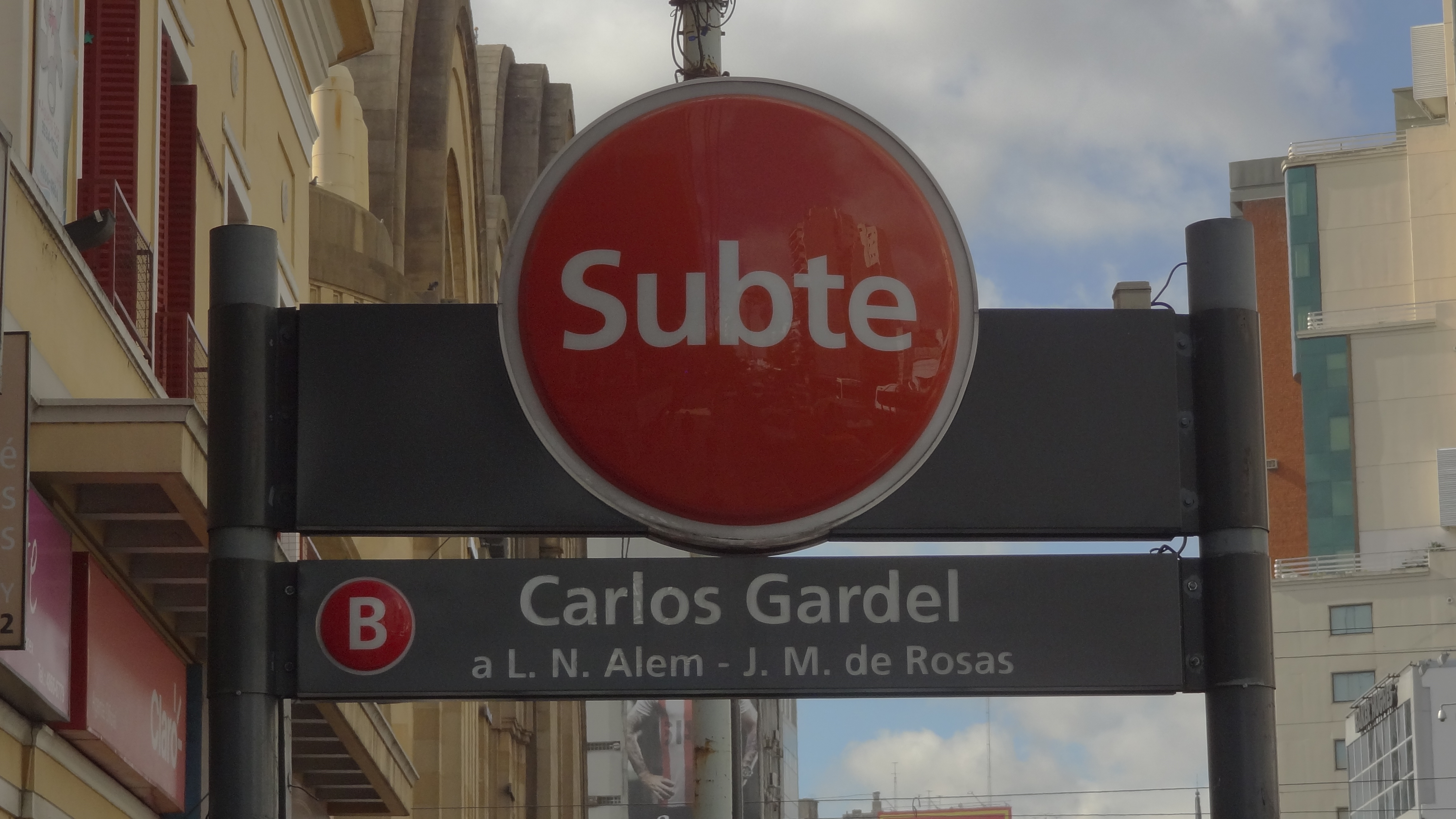
Entrance to the station
