= Malabia - Osvaldo Pugliese (Buenos Aires Underground) =

Buenos Aires Underground station

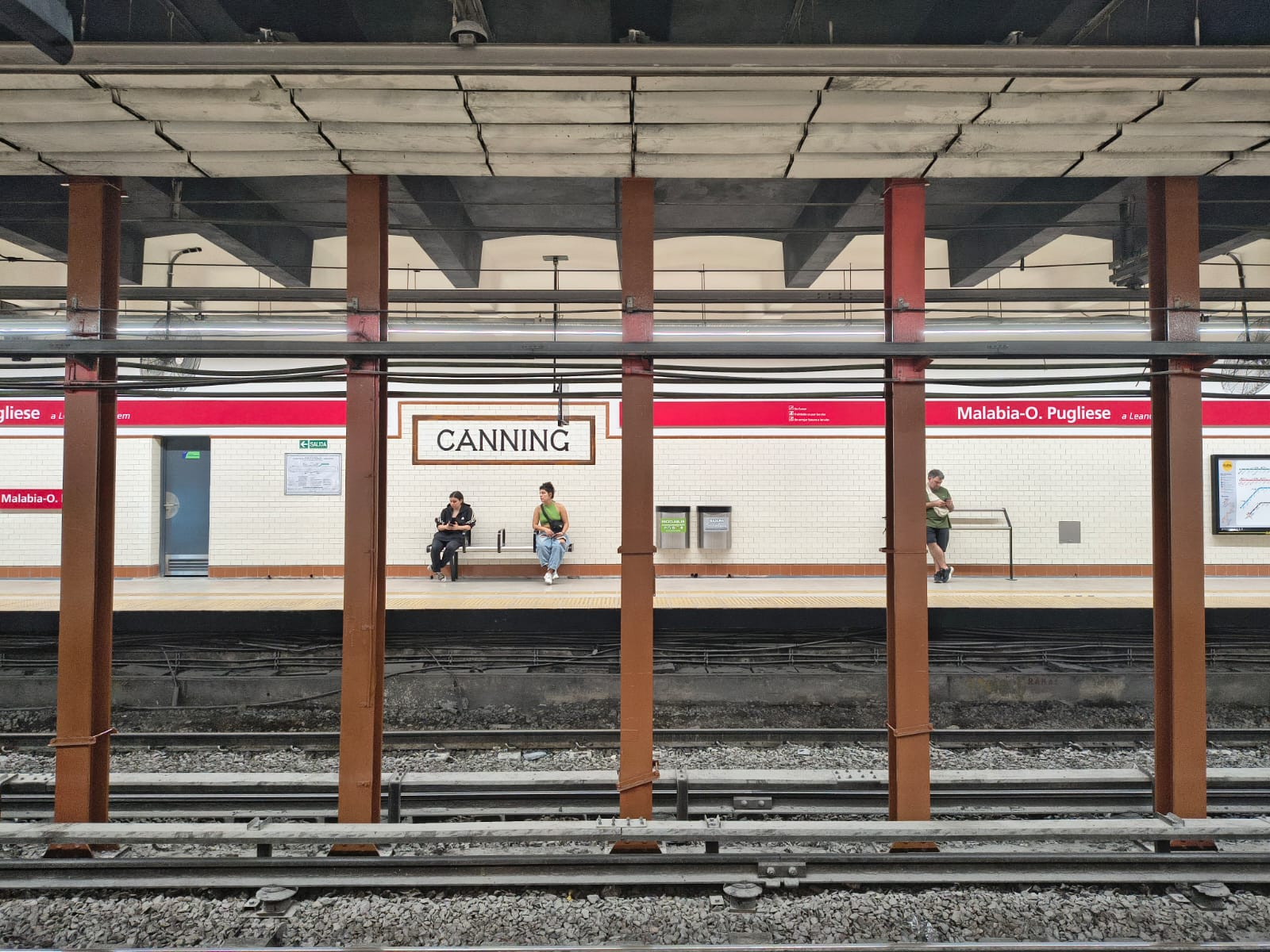

General information
- Location: Corrientes and Malabia
- Coordinates: 34°35′58.9″S 58°26′20.3″W
- Platforms: Side platforms

History
- Opened: 17 October 1930

Services
Preceding station	Buenos Aires Underground	Following station
Dorrego towards Juan Manuel de Rosas	Line B	Ángel Gallardo towards Leandro N. Alem
Location

Malabia - Osvaldo Pugliese is a station on Line B of the Buenos Aires Metro. The station was opened on 17 October 1930 as part of the inaugural section of the line between Federico Lacroze and Callao.

== Overview ==
Malabia Station is located in the Villa Crespo barrio, at the intersection of Avenida Corrientes and Calle Malabia, and named after the latter. The Osvaldo Pugliese part of the name was added in 2010 to commemorate the Argentine tango musician Osvaldo Pugliese.

Before being known as Malabia, the station was called Canning, but when Canning Avenue was renamed Scalabrini Ortíz in honour of the poet and journalist Raúl Scalabrini Ortiz, the name Malabia was adopted to avoid confusion with Scalabrini Ortiz station on Line D.

The station was reopened in 2026 after being renovated.

From this station, passengers will be able to transfer to the Corrientes Station on Line I once Line I is built.
