= Ángel Gallardo (Buenos Aires Underground) =

Buenos Aires Underground station

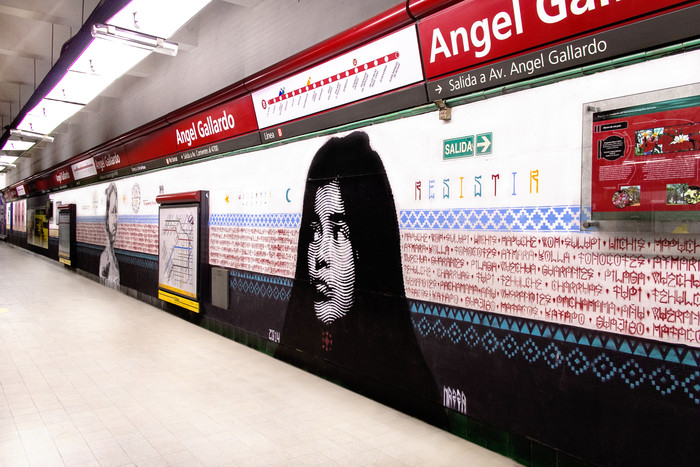

General information
- Location: Corrientes and Angel Gallardo
- Coordinates: 34°36′7.8″S 58°25′52.5″W
- Platforms: Side platforms

History
- Opened: 17 October 1930

Services
Preceding station	Buenos Aires Underground	Following station
Malabia - Osvaldo Pugliese towards Juan Manuel de Rosas	Line B	Medrano towards Leandro N. Alem
Location

Ángel Gallardo is a station on Line B of the Buenos Aires Underground. This is the station for Parque Centenario and the Natural History Museum.

The station is located at the intersection of Avenida Corrientes and Angel Gallardo, and named after the latter. The station was opened on 17 October 1930 as part of the inaugural section of the line between Federico Lacroze and Callao. Its original name was Rio de Janeiro.
