= Medrano (Buenos Aires Underground) =

Buenos Aires Underground station

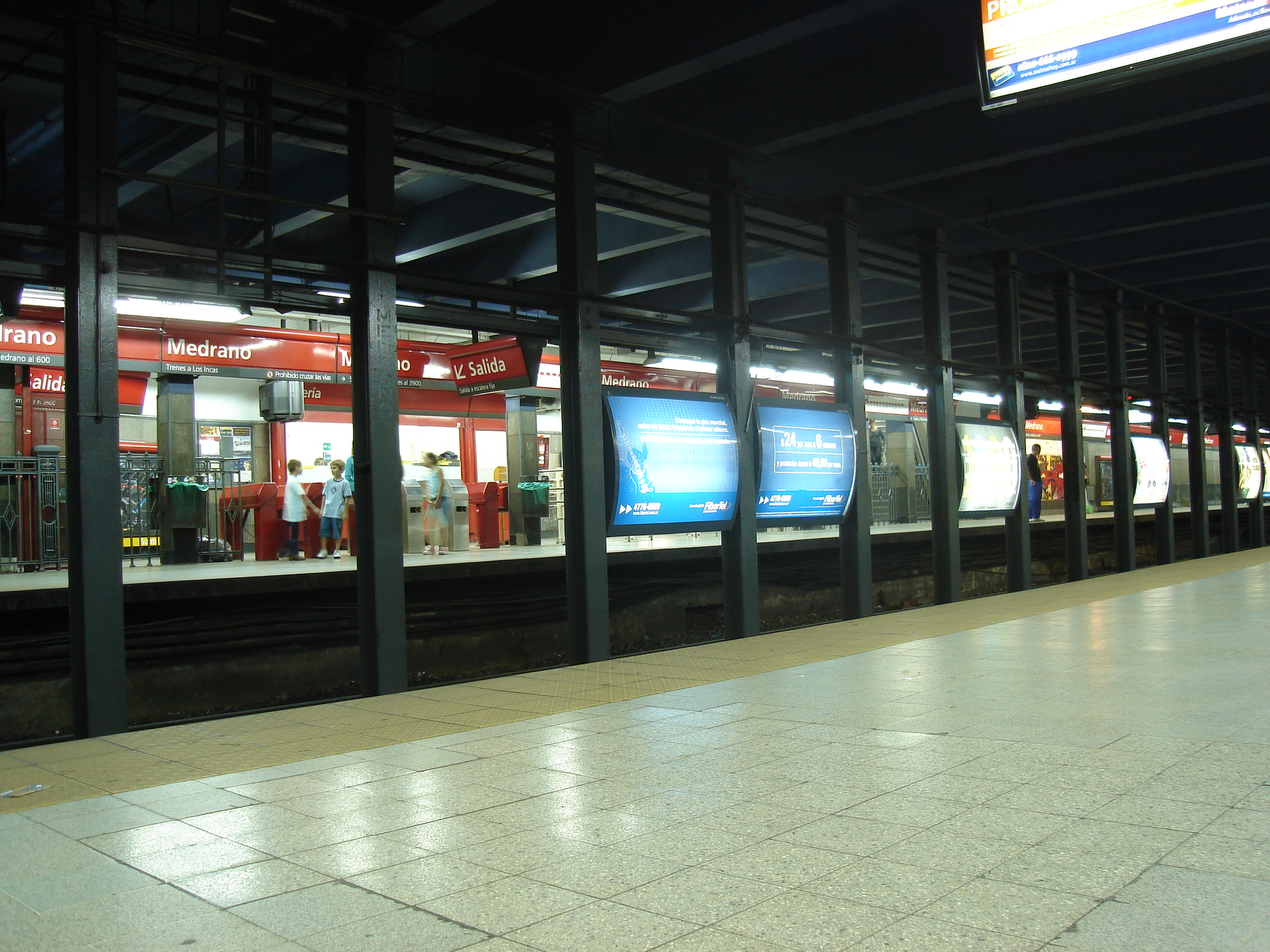

General information
- Location: Corrientes and Medrano
- Coordinates: 34°36′11.5″S 58°25′15.4″W
- Platforms: Side platforms

History
- Opened: 17 October 1930

Services
Preceding station	Buenos Aires Underground	Following station
Ángel Gallardo towards Juan Manuel de Rosas	Line B	Carlos Gardel towards Leandro N. Alem
Location

Medrano is a station on Line B of the Buenos Aires Underground. The station was opened on 17 October 1930 as part of the inaugural section of the line between Federico Lacroze and Callao.

== Overview ==
It is located in the Almagro barrio, at the intersection of Avenida Corrientes and Avenida Medrano, and named after the latter.

It is the nearest subway station to the National Technological University and the Hospital Italiano de Buenos Aires.
