= Dorrego (Buenos Aires Underground) =

Buenos Aires Underground station

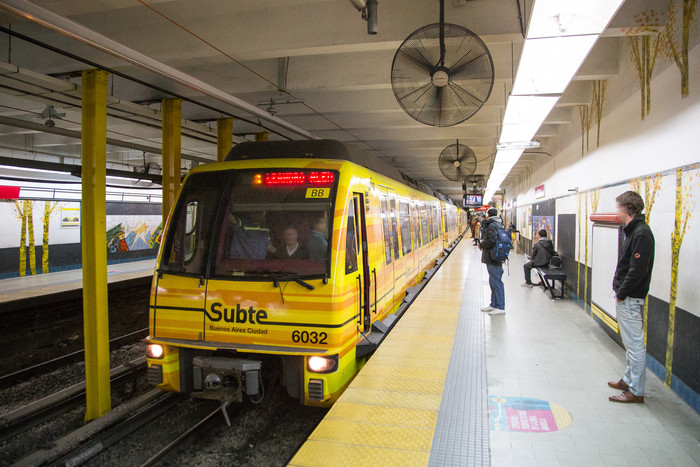

General information
- Location: Corrientes 6000, at Dorrego
- Coordinates: 34°35′30.2″S 58°26′51.3″W
- Owner: Subterráneos de Buenos Aires
- Operator: Metrovías
- Distance: 7.6 km (4.7 mi)
- Platforms: Side platforms
- Tracks: 2
- Connections: San Martín Line; Metrobus Juan B. Justo

Construction
- Structure type: Underground

History
- Opened: 17 October 1930; 95 years ago

Services
Preceding station	Buenos Aires Underground	Following station
Federico Lacroze towards Juan Manuel de Rosas	Line B	Malabia - Osvaldo Pugliese towards Leandro N. Alem
Location

Dorrego is a station on Line B of the Buenos Aires Underground. The station was opened on 17 October 1930 as part of the inaugural section of the line between Federico Lacroze and Callao.

It is located at the intersection of Avenida Corrientes and Avenida Dorrego, and named after the latter. One of the corners of the Parque de los Andes is also located at that intersection. The station connects with Villa Crespo Station of the San Martín Line commuter rail service, as well as Metrobus Juan B. Justo.

== Gallery ==
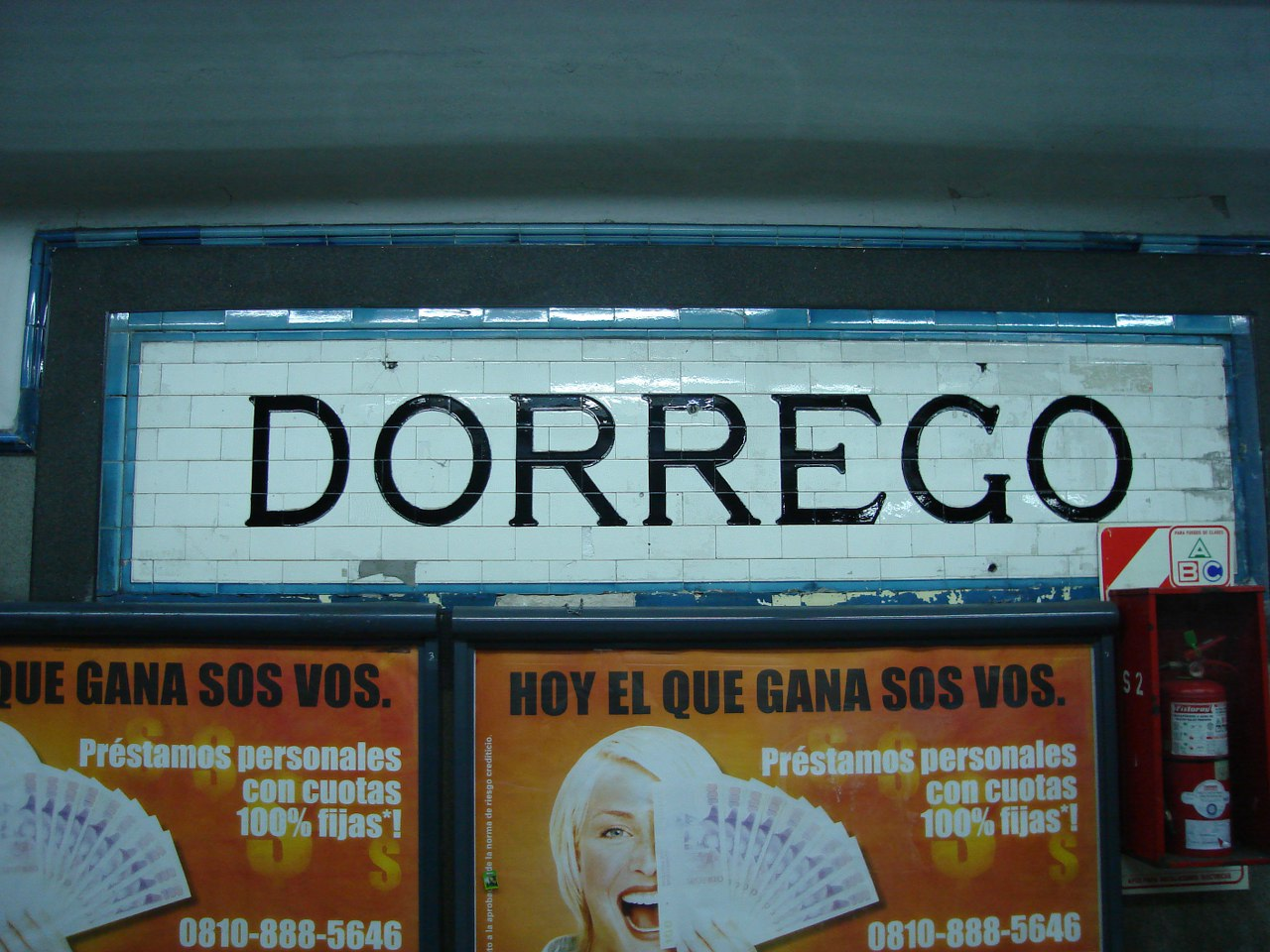
The original 1930 signage is still preserved

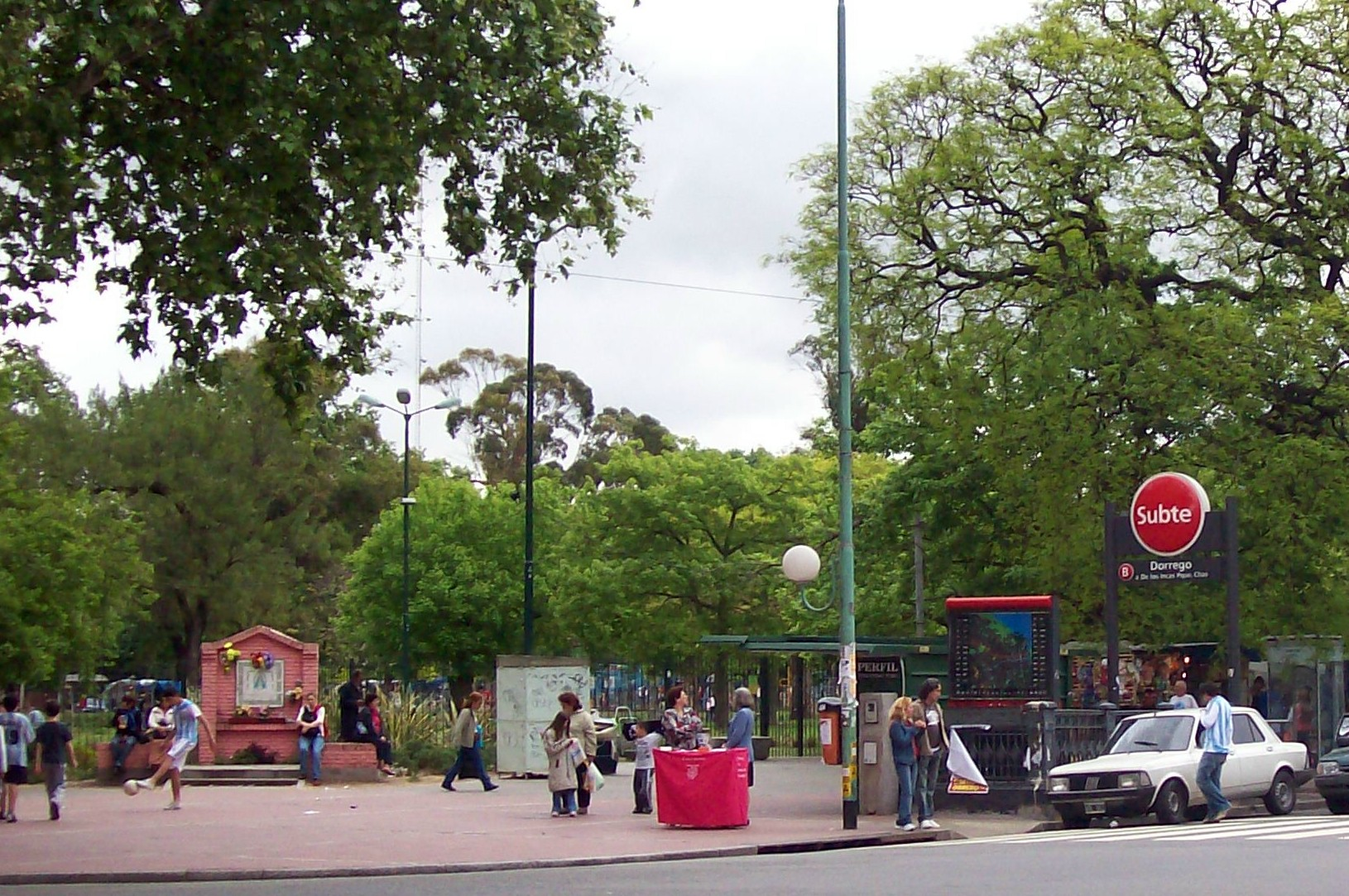
One of the entrances of the station, at a corner of the Parque de los Andes
