= Federico Lacroze =

Argentine businessman and entrepreneur

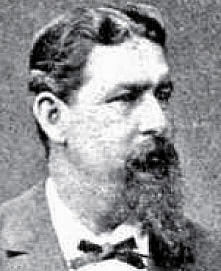
- Portrait of Lacroze, late 1800s
- Born: November 4, 1835; Buenos Aires, Argentina
- Died: February 16, 1899 (aged 63); Buenos Aires, Argentina
- Occupations: Businessman, entrepreneur
- Known for: Railway pioneer and founder of the Buenos Aires Central Railway

Federico Lacroze (4 November 1835 – 16 February 1899) was an Argentine businessman and railway entrepreneur. He created the first tram line in Buenos Aires and his Buenos Aires Central Railway helped link the provinces of Entre Ríos, Corrientes and Misiones by rail to Argentina's capital. Lacroze is buried in La Recoleta Cemetery, Buenos Aires.

== Biography ==
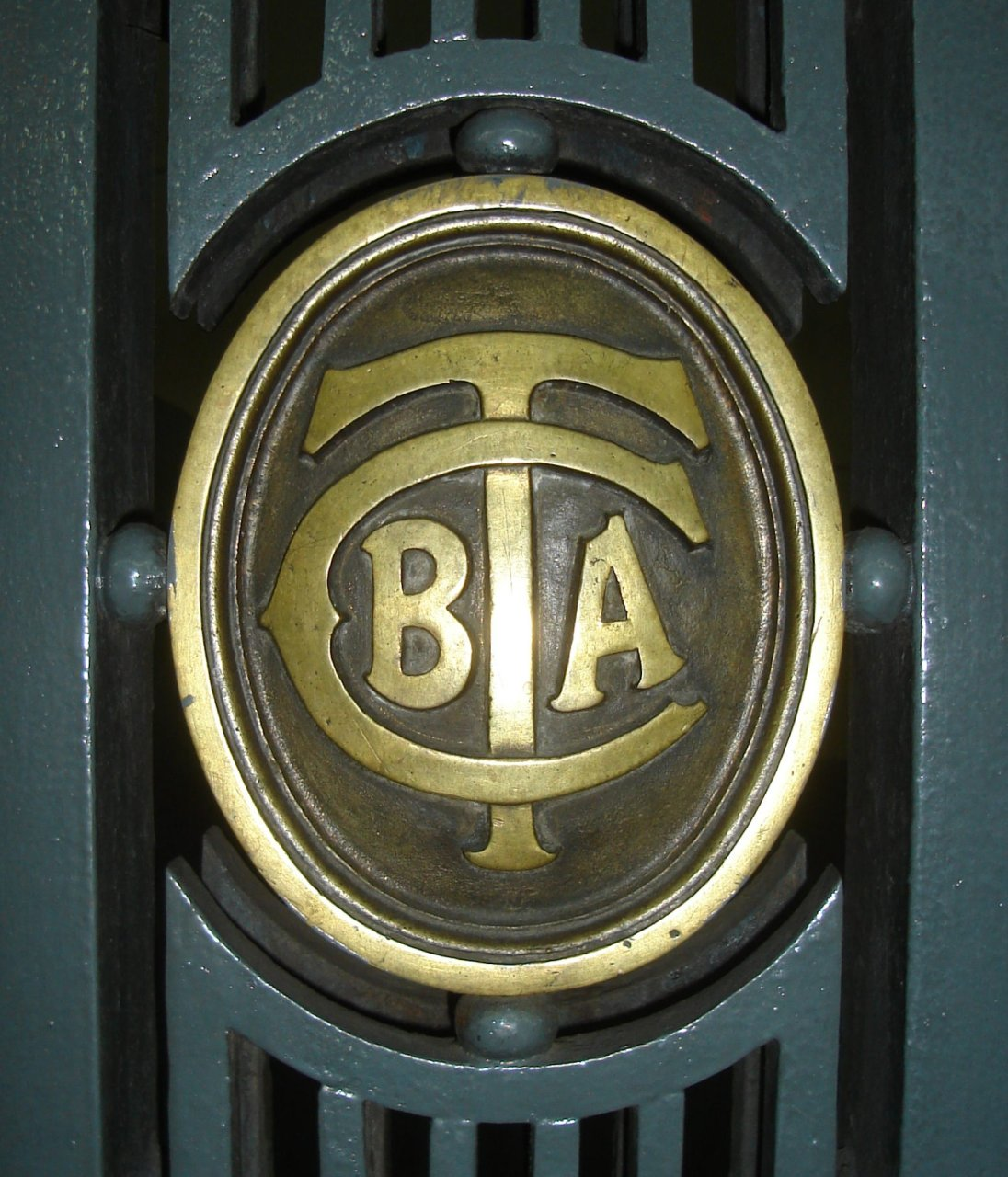
Buenos Aires Central Terminal bronze plaque at F. Lacroze station.

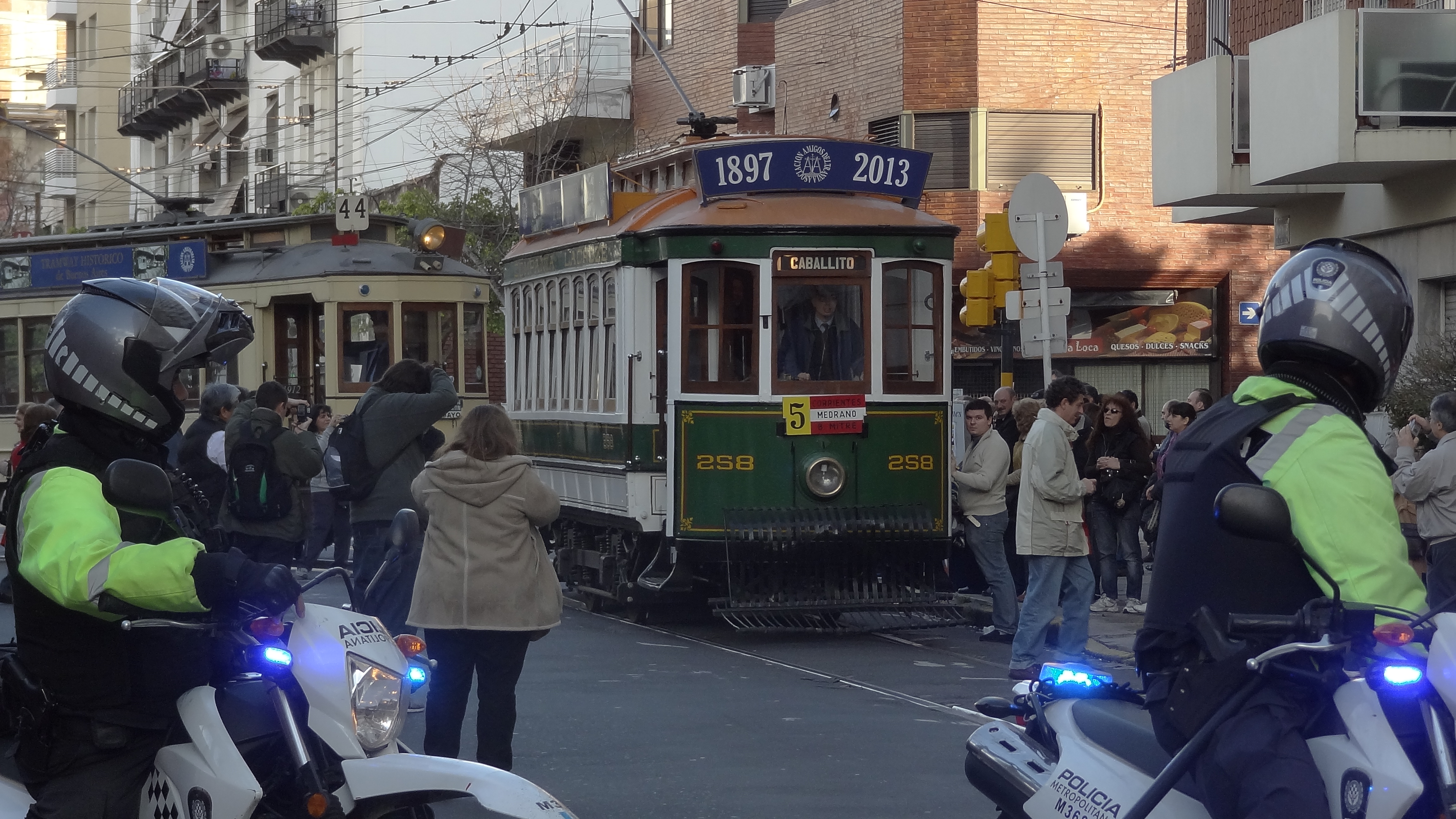
A Lacroze Company tram on the Buenos Aires Heritage Tramway.

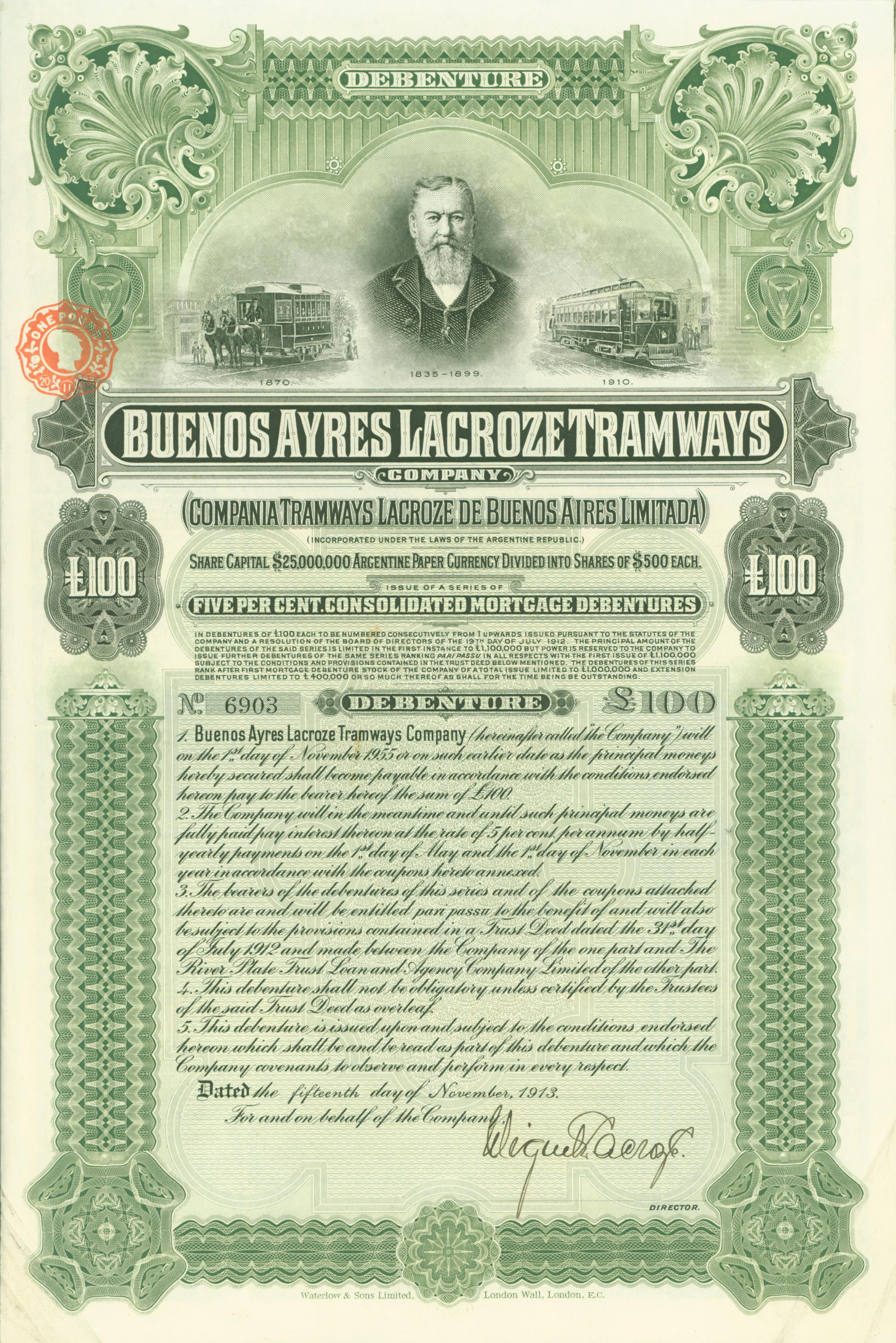
Illustration of Federico Lacroze on a debenture of the Buenos Ayres Lacroze Tramways Company

Federico Lacroze was the second of eight children born to Juan Lacroze, who had immigrated at a young age to Argentina. He began working from a young age at the Mallmann bank until he was 20 years of age when he moved to Chivilcoy, where he started a business with activities in agriculture.

His relationship with the railway industry began in 1866 when he proposed constructing a railway line between Luján and Salto. The proposal was turned down given budgetary constraints as a result of the war of the triple alliance.

By the 1870s, Lacroze (together with other Argentine businessmen) proposed the construction of a tram system in the city of Buenos Aires. After some debate in the Argentine National Congress, the proposal was approved and Lacroze began the construction of Buenos Aires' tramways together with his brother Julio. The first segment was completed in 1871 and its route passed through approximately sixty blocks from the Plaza de Mayo to Plaza Miserere.

During this time he also created what was at the time the longest horse-driven railway in the world, from Buenos Aires to Rojas. Parts of this line were then electrified and joined with the province of Entre Ríos to create what is today the General Urquiza Railway. In the neighbourhood of Chacarita he created an underground station which he intended to be the central terminal for his Buenos Aires Central Railway, however this would eventually become a station for Line B of the Buenos Aires Underground and the railway station that serves the Urquiza Line and General Urquiza Railway was moved above ground.

Lacroze was also a Freemason, becoming a member of the Logia Regeneración Nº 5 in 1857. He died in Belgrano in 1899 and was buried in La Recoleta Cemetery.

== Tramway Rural gallery ==
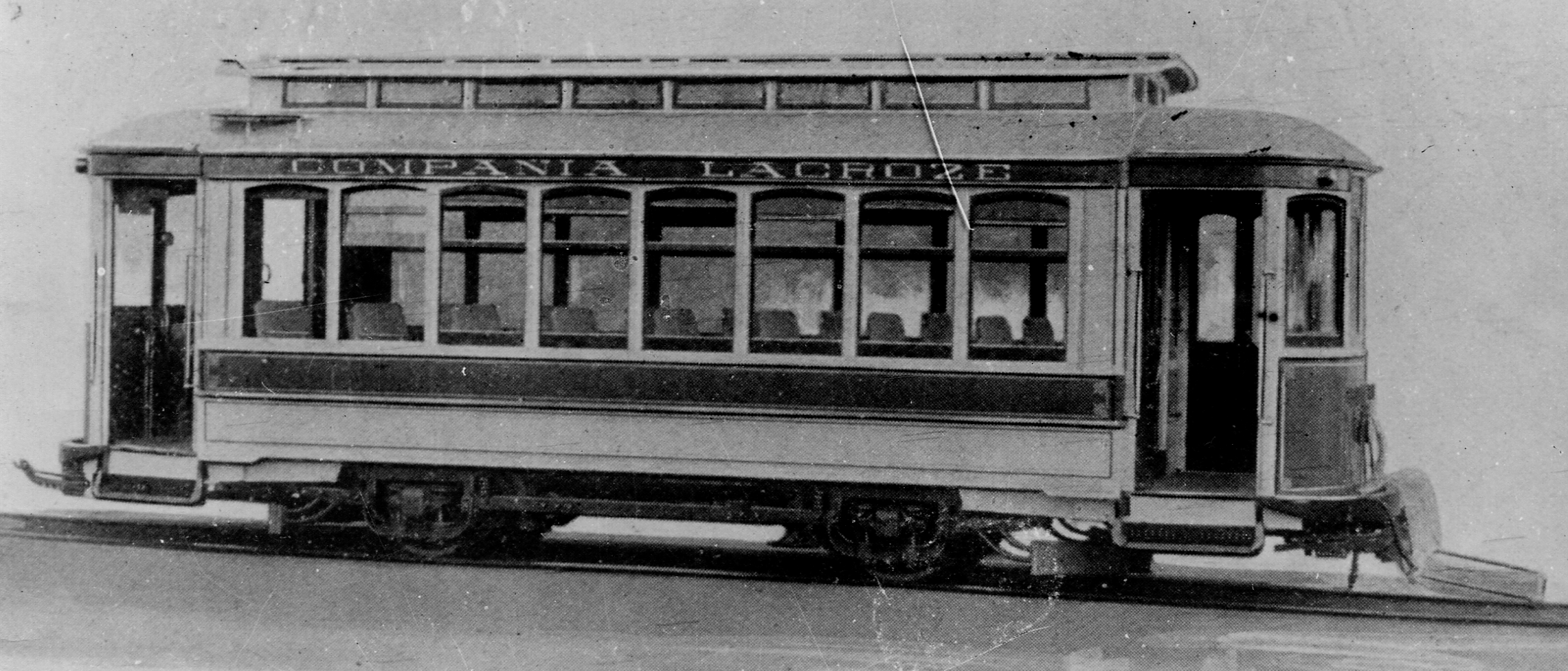

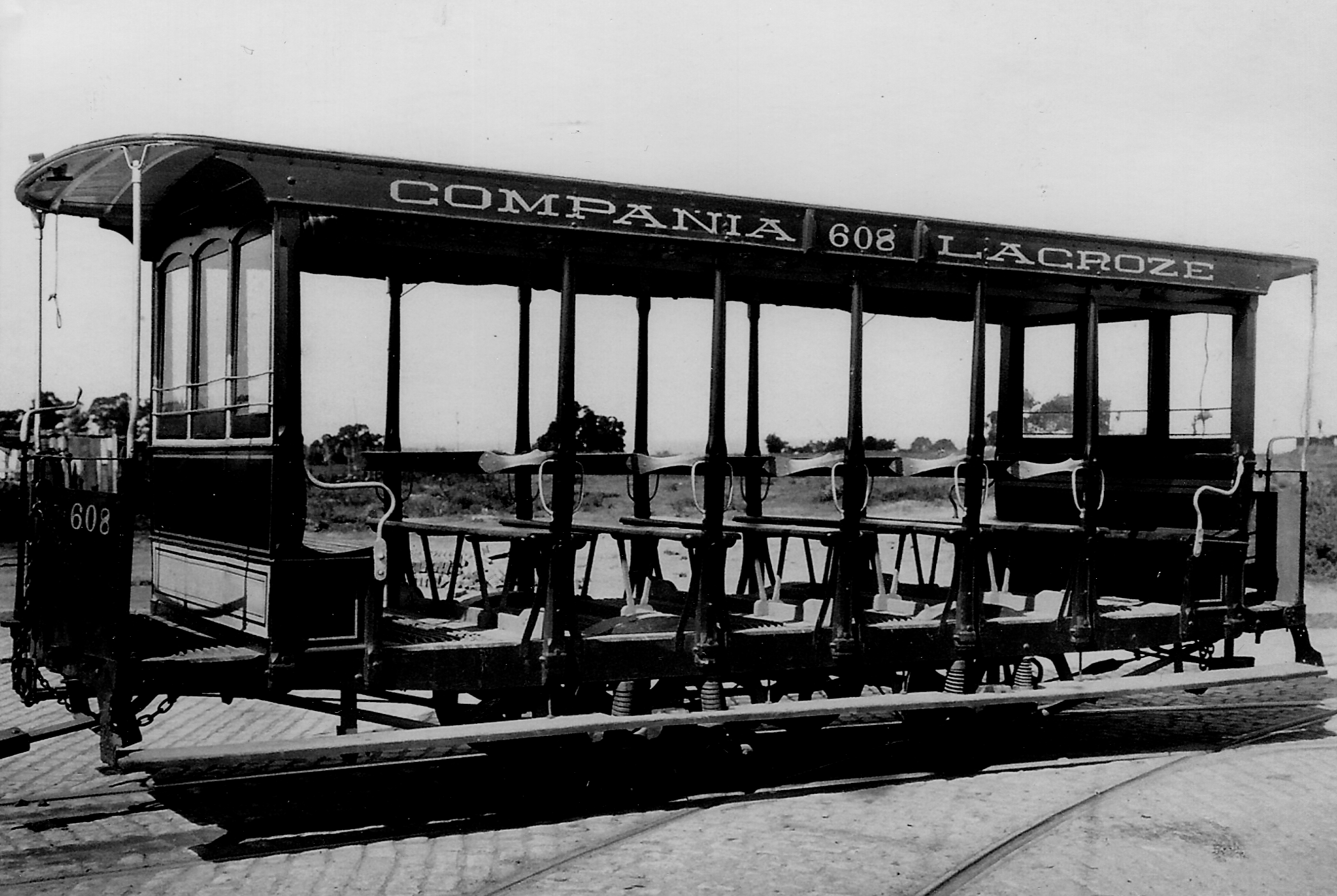

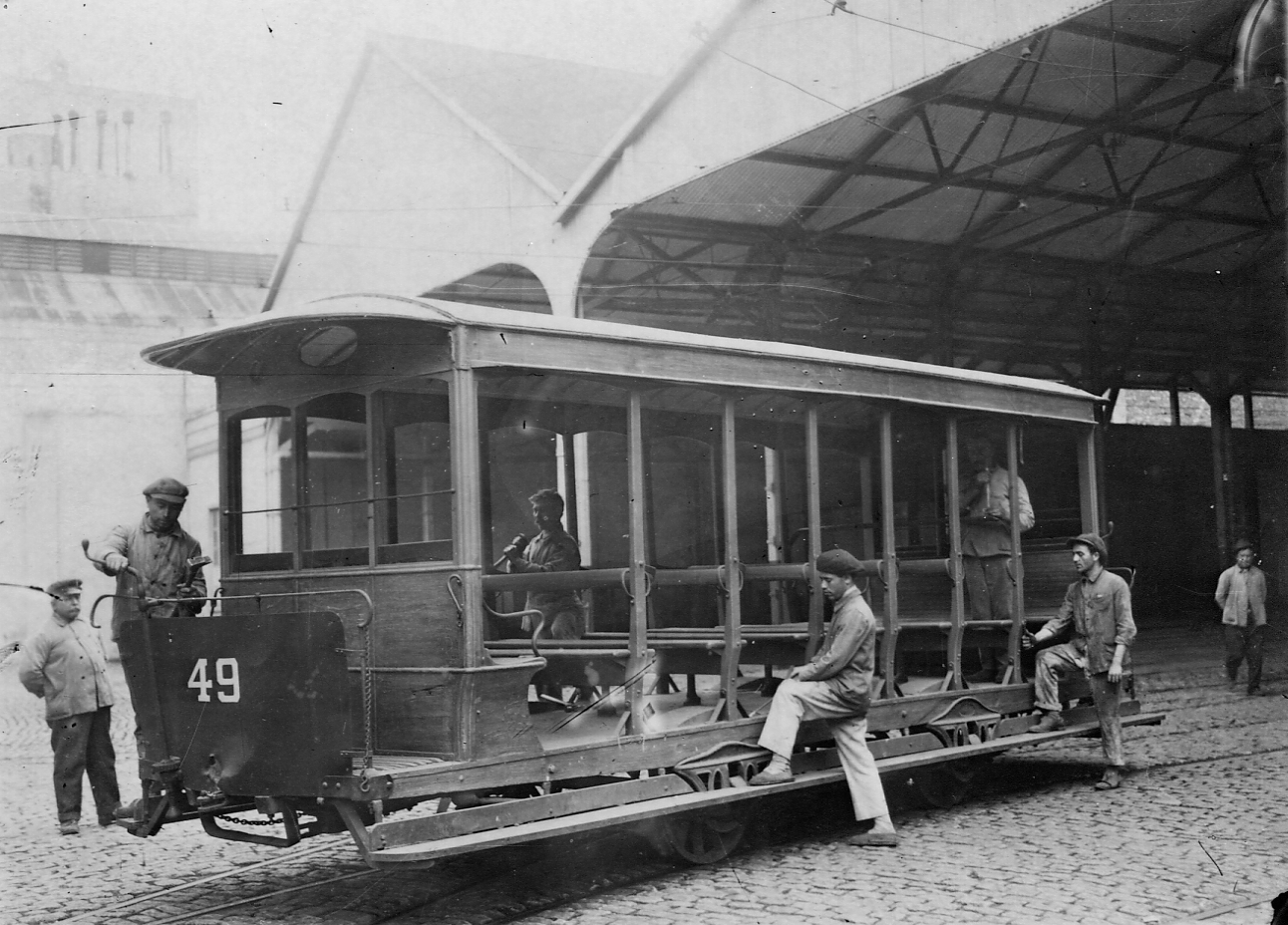

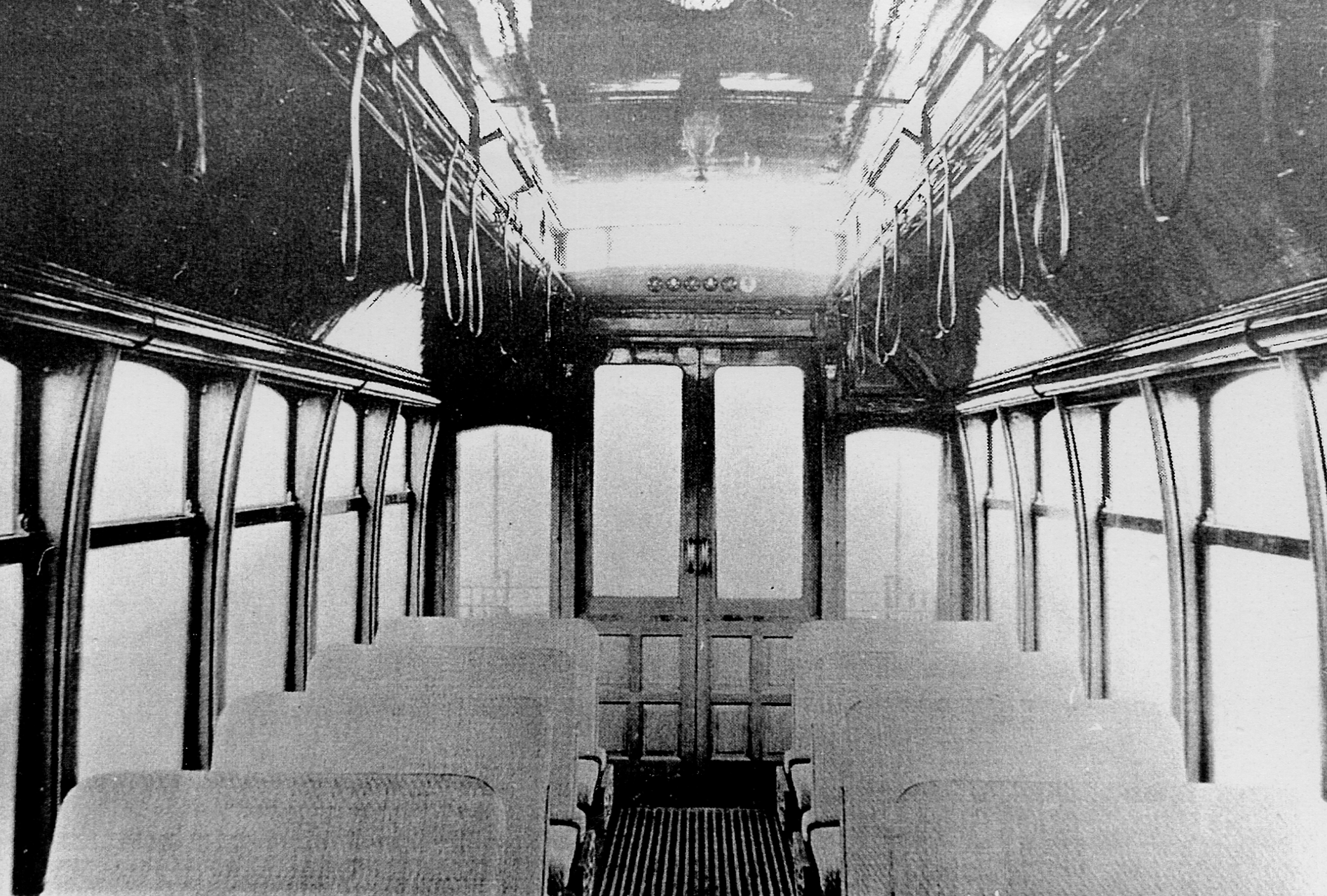

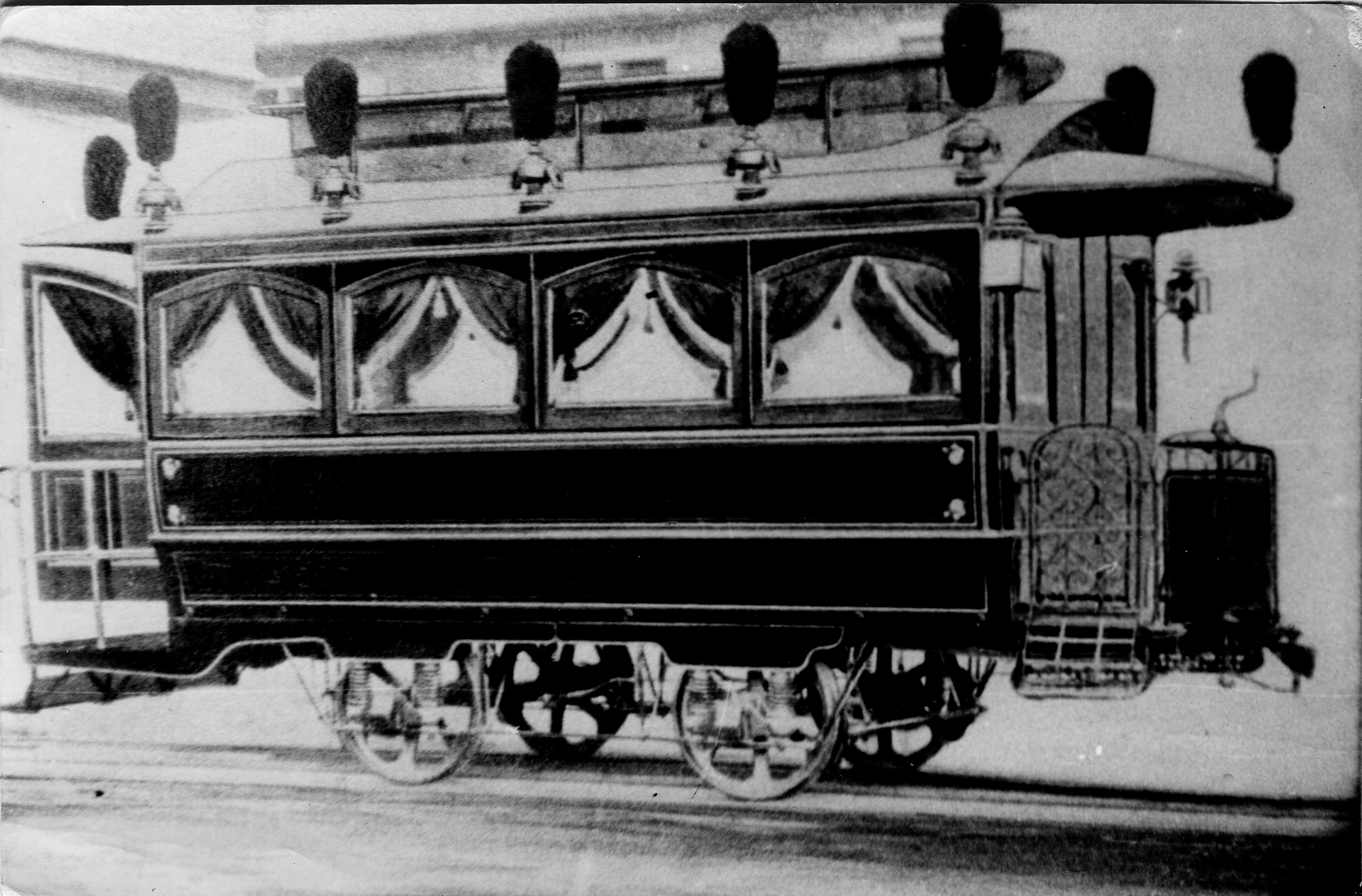

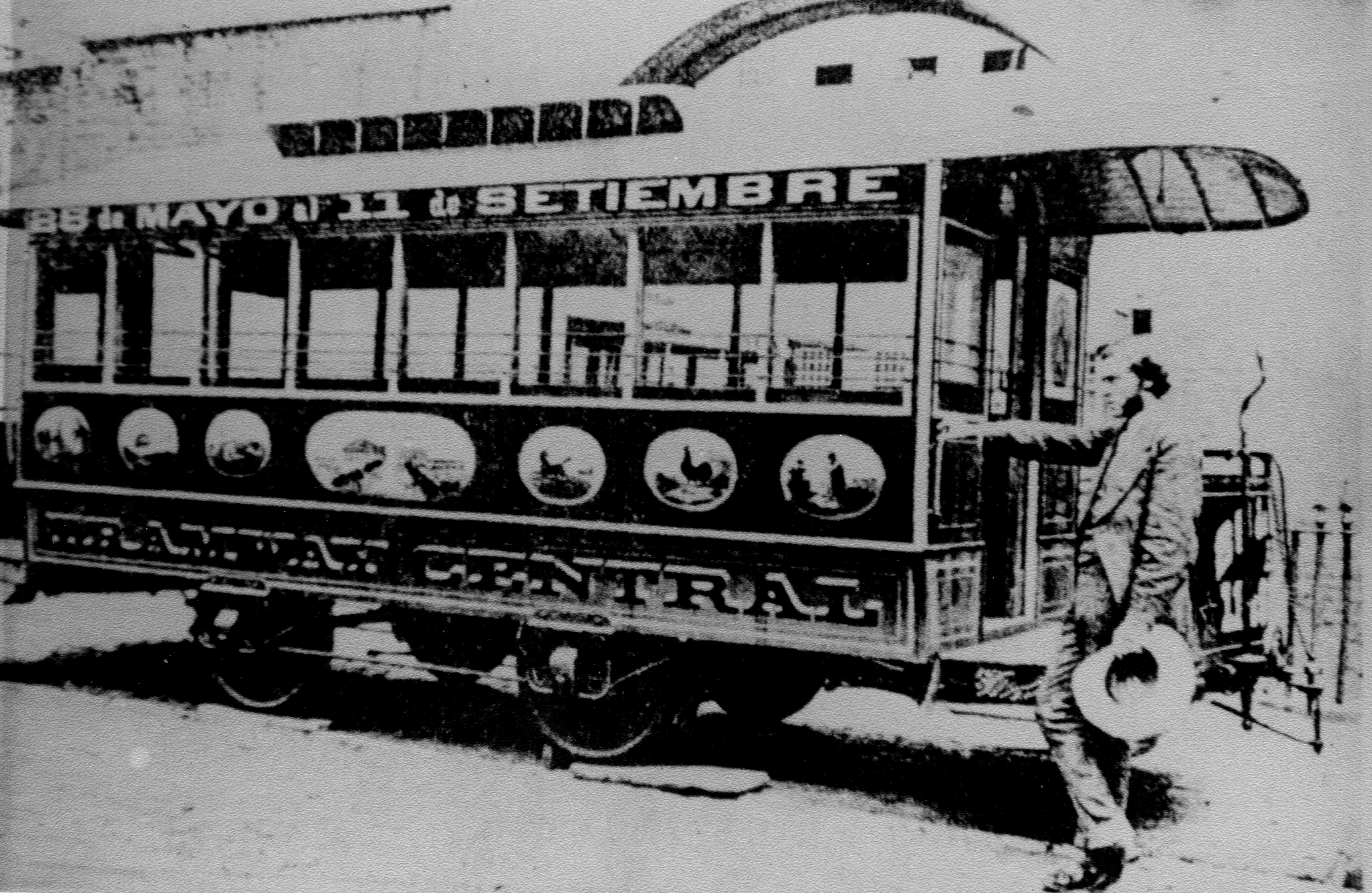

== See also ==
- Buenos Aires Central Railway
- Urquiza Railway
- Trams in Buenos Aires
- Rail transport in Argentina
