= Villa Urquiza =

Coordinates: 34°34′24″S 58°29′49″W

- Neighborhood of Buenos Aires
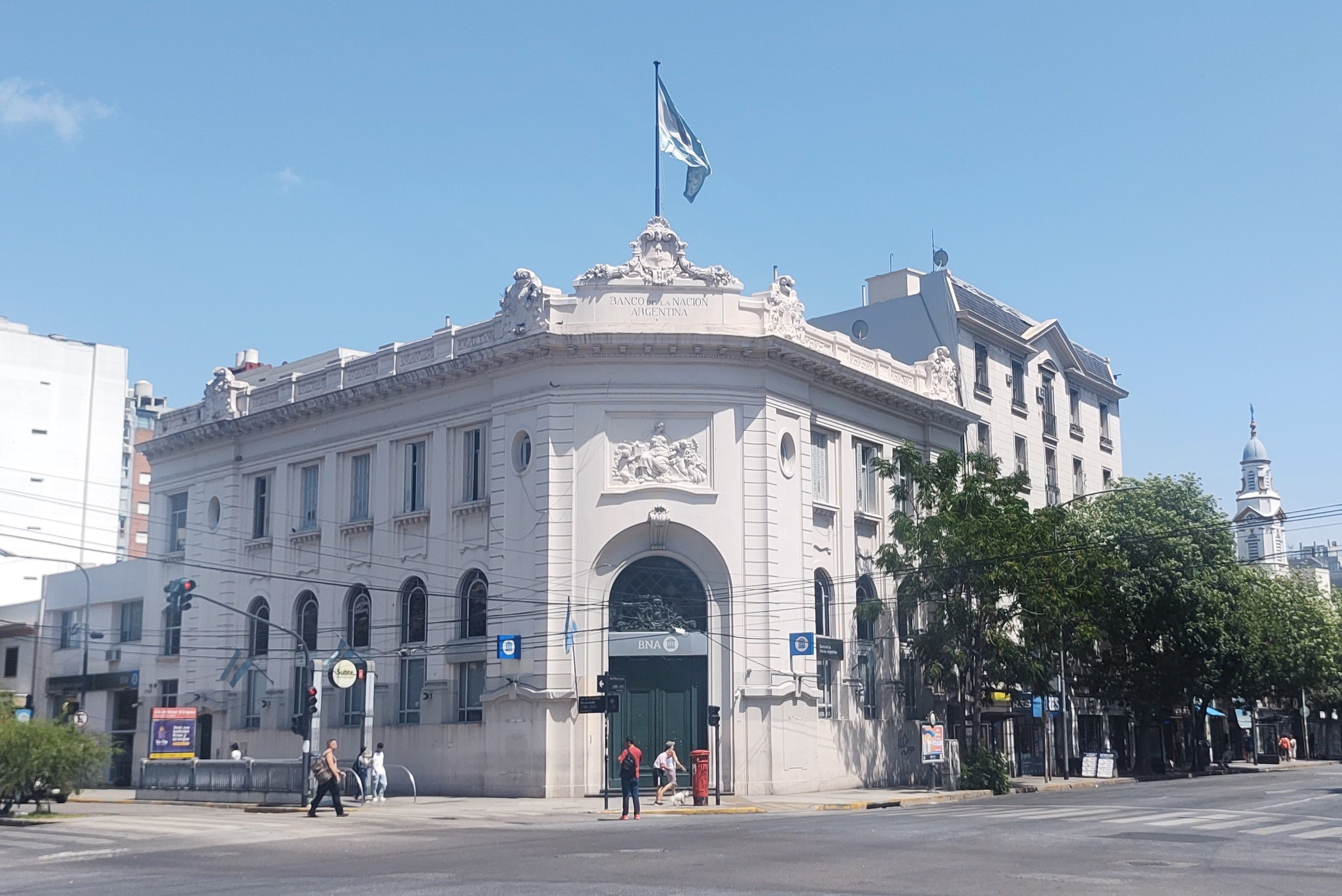
- Banco Nación on the Triunvirato Avenue

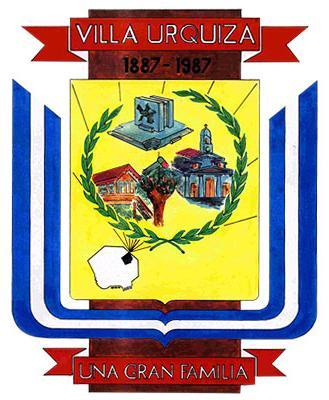
- Coat of arms

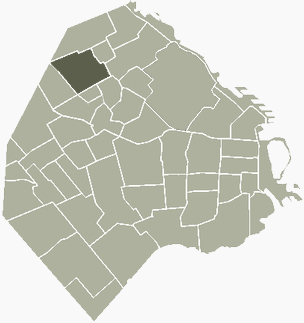
- Location of Villa Urquiza within Buenos Aires
- Country: Argentina
- Autonomous City: Buenos Aires
- Comuna: C12

Area
  - Total: 5.6 km^{2} (2.2 sq mi)

Population (2001)
  - Total: 89,360
  - Density: 16,000/km^{2} (41,000/sq mi)
- Time zone: UTC-3 (ART)

Villa Urquiza is a barrio or neighborhood of Buenos Aires, Argentina. It is located between the barrios of Villa Pueyrredón, Belgrano, Villa Ortúzar, Coghlan, Saavedra and Agronomía. Its limits are the streets and avenues Constituyentes, Crisólogo Larralde, Galván, Núñez, Tronador, Roosevelt, Rómulo S. Naón and La Pampa.

It is a residential neighborhood with older houses and apartment buildings, quiet streets and a few high-traffic avenues. It has several parks. During warm weather, residents commonly socialize on sidewalk chairs.

It is also home of several institutions of importance to the Buenos Aires culture, such as the tango and milonga ballrooms Sunderland and Club Sin Rumbo, Argentine rock pioneer Litto Nebbia's Melopea Records, and the winner of three in a row futsal metropolitan tournaments, Club Pinocho.

== History ==
The founder of Villa Urquiza was Francisco Seeber, who was a soldier in the War of the Triple Alliance against Paraguay. Seeber was also Mayor of Buenos Aires between 1889 and 1890, merchant and president of the Buenos Aires Western Railway. In its beginnings, the barrio was composed of three small neighborhoods called Villa Catalinas, Villa Mazzini and Villa Modelo.

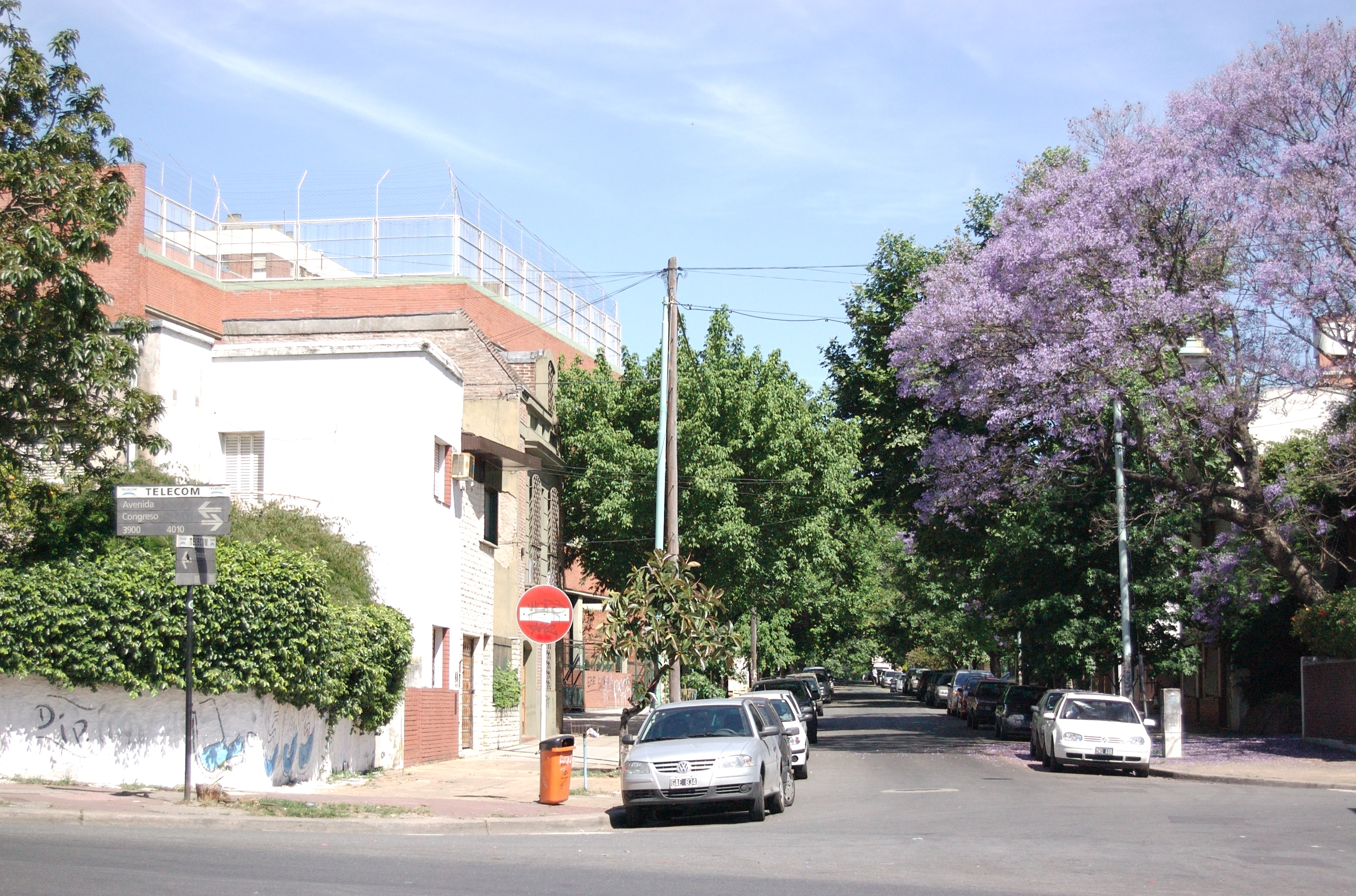
Residential section at Calle Tronador and Avenida Congreso

The neighborhoods were situated on top of highlands, almost 40 meters (130 feet) above sea level. At the time, Francisco Seeber owned a company downtown called "Muelle de las Catalinas" (Catalinas Wharfs), located at the time on very low ground. He bought land in the former area with the intent of hauling soil to Catalinas for land reclamation. The workers that had worked on the project were mostly from the Province of Entre Ríos, and in 1901, they successfully petitioned for the neighborhood to be named after their provincial hero, Justo José de Urquiza.

Villa Urquiza has been served by the Mitre Railway Line since 1902. Work began on a Buenos Aires Metro Line B extension into Villa Urquiza in 2010, helping increase the neighborhood's appeal as a bedroom community for downtown-bound commuters. The extension was finished in 2013 and now serves as the last stop of the B line.

Day of the neighborhood: October 2
