= Federico Lacroze (Buenos Aires Underground) =

Buenos Aires Underground station

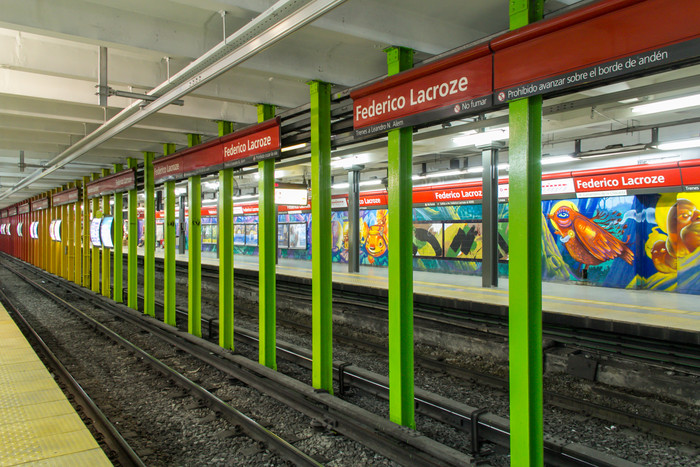

General information
- Location: Corrientes and Federico Lacroze
- Coordinates: 34°35′13.6″S 58°27′19.3″W
- Platforms: Side platforms
- Connections: Urquiza Line and General Urquiza Railway

History
- Opened: 17 October 1930

Services
Preceding station	Buenos Aires Underground	Following station
Tronador - Villa Ortúzar towards Juan Manuel de Rosas	Line B	Dorrego towards Leandro N. Alem
Location

Federico Lacroze is an underground station on Line B of the Buenos Aires Underground named after the Argentine railway entrepreneur, located at the intersection of Corrientes and Federico Lacroze avenues in the Chacarita neighbourhood and near the La Chacarita Cemetery. The station was opened on 17 October 1930 as the western terminus of the extension of the line from Federico Lacroze to Callao.

It was a terminal station of line B from its inauguration and the inauguration of the extension to the Incas station on 9 August 2003.

This station has rail connection to Federico Lacroze railway station, the central station of the General Urquiza Railway and terminus of the Urquiza Line suburban electric commuter line operated by the underground operator Metrovías.

== History ==
Originally, the underground station was intended to be the central terminal for Federico Lacroze's Buenos Aires Central Railway, however years later when construction of Line B began, it became an underground station. When the Federico Lacroze railway station was built, the Urquiza Line and General Urquiza Railway were moved permanently above ground.

== Gallery ==
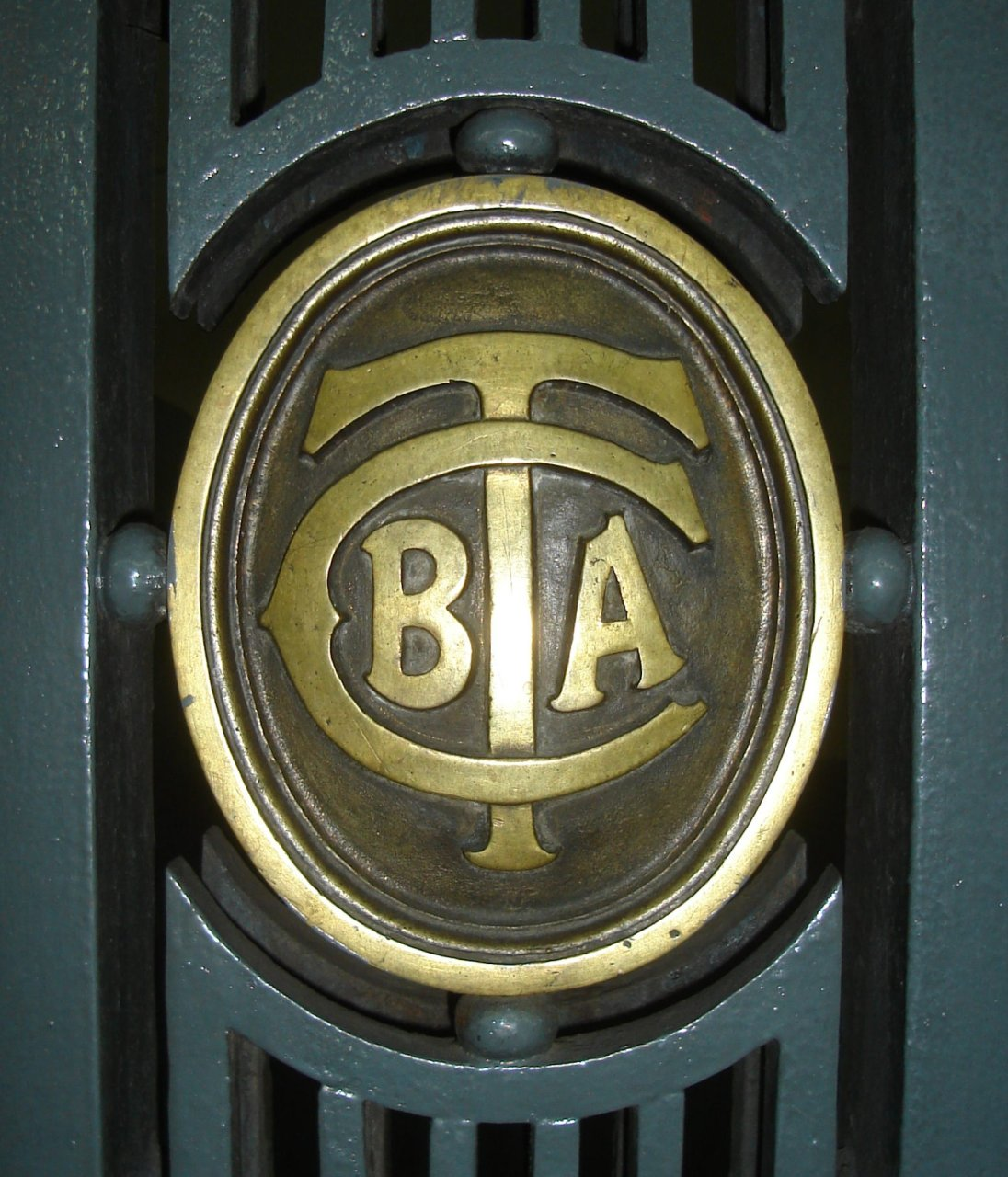
Original Buenos Aires Central Railway plaque

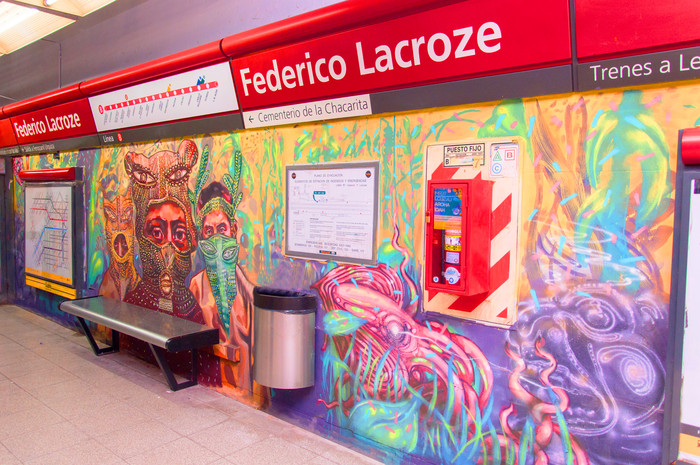
Modern mural

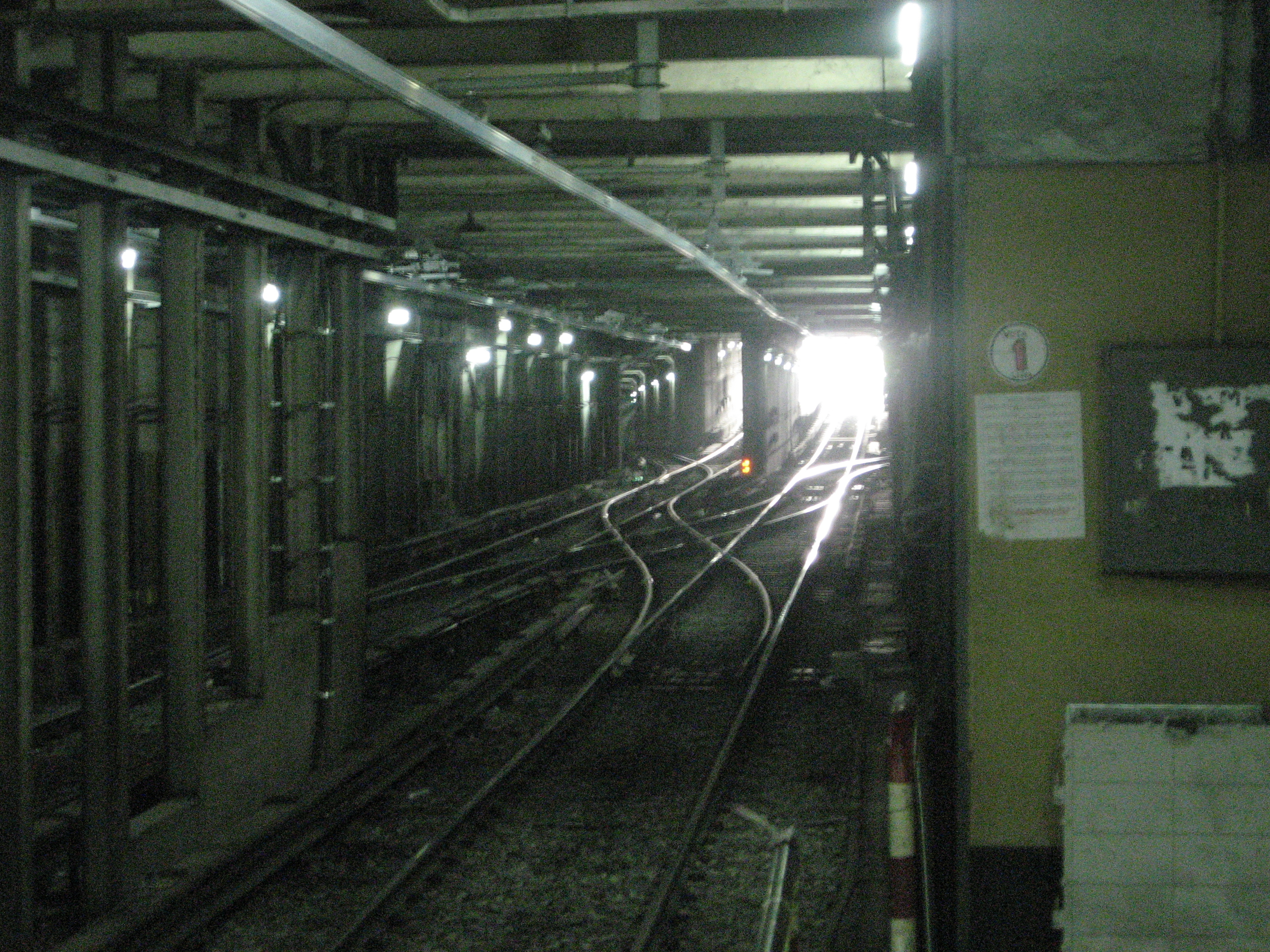
Ramp that leads to the General Urquiza Railway

== Nearby ==
- La Chacarita Cemetery
- Federico Lacroze railway station
