= Line B (Buenos Aires Underground) =

Rapid transit line in Buenos Aires

Line B

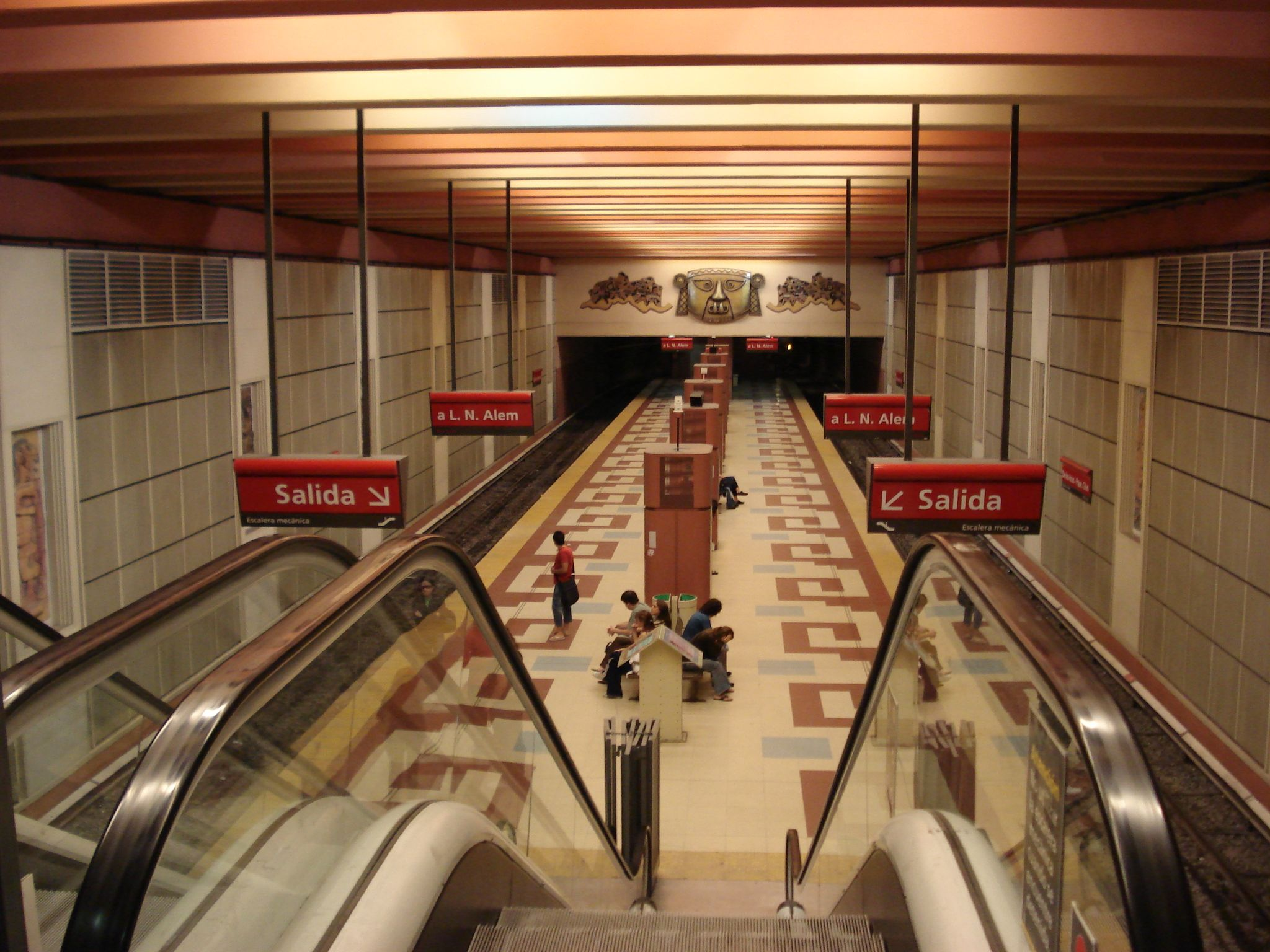
- De los Incas station

Overview
- Termini: Leandro N. Alem; Juan Manuel de Rosas
- Stations: 17

Service
- Type: Rapid transit
- System: Buenos Aires Underground
- Operator: Emova
- Daily ridership: 137,167 (2024)

History
- Opened: 17 October 1930; 95 years ago
- Last extension: 2013

Technical
- Line length: 11.75 km (7.30 mi)
- Character: Underground
- Track gauge: 1,435 mm (4 ft 8 1/2 in) standard gauge
- Electrification: Overhead line and third rail, 550 V DC

Line B of the Buenos Aires Underground runs 11.75 kilometres (7.30 mi) from Leandro N. Alem to Juan Manuel de Rosas in Villa Urquiza. Line B opened to the public on 17 October 1930.

In recent years, it has held the title of being the most used line of the Buenos Aires Underground, and its patronage has increased even more after the opening of a section of tunnel between Los Incas station in the neighbourhood of Parque Chas and a shopping centre in Villa Urquiza. It was the first line in Buenos Aires whose stations had turnstiles and moving stairways.

It is the only line that uses third rail current collection, while the rest of the Underground lines collect electric current from overhead lines, although there has been ongoing conversion to overhead lines to incorporate new rolling stock. Its gauge of 4 ft 8 1/2 in (1,435 mm) is the same as the rest of the Buenos Aires underground system.

The rolling stock currently used on the B line are former Tokyo Metro (formerly Eidan Subway) 300/500/900 stock, which was used on Marunouchi Line, and CAF 6000 stock. The Japanese units were acquired in the early 1990s, and offer less sitting room than the previous rolling stock, increasing the line's capacity during peak hours. The Japanese trains have been partially supplanted by CAF 6000 rolling stock, acquired in 2013 from the Madrid Metro.

== History ==
In 1912 the Congress of Argentina enacted Law 8,870 to construct a line that would unite the Correo Central (Central Post Office) and the intersection of Triunvirato and Elcano streets, and meet with the tracks of the Buenos Aires Central Railroad (Ferrocarril Central de Buenos Aires or FCCBA), which belonged to the same business group, through an 8.7 km (5.4 mi) tunnel. The Act provided that the works "would help reduce traffic in the central area of the city".

On 17 December 1927 in New York City the financial agreement to build the line was signed between Teófilo Lacroze, the president of Banco de la Nación Dr. Tomás de Estrada, Dr. Louis J. Rocca directory owner of Ferrocarril Terminal de Buenos Aires and bankers Harris and Forbes. This agreement granted the concession of the line for passengers, parcels and freight to Lacroze Brothers Company.

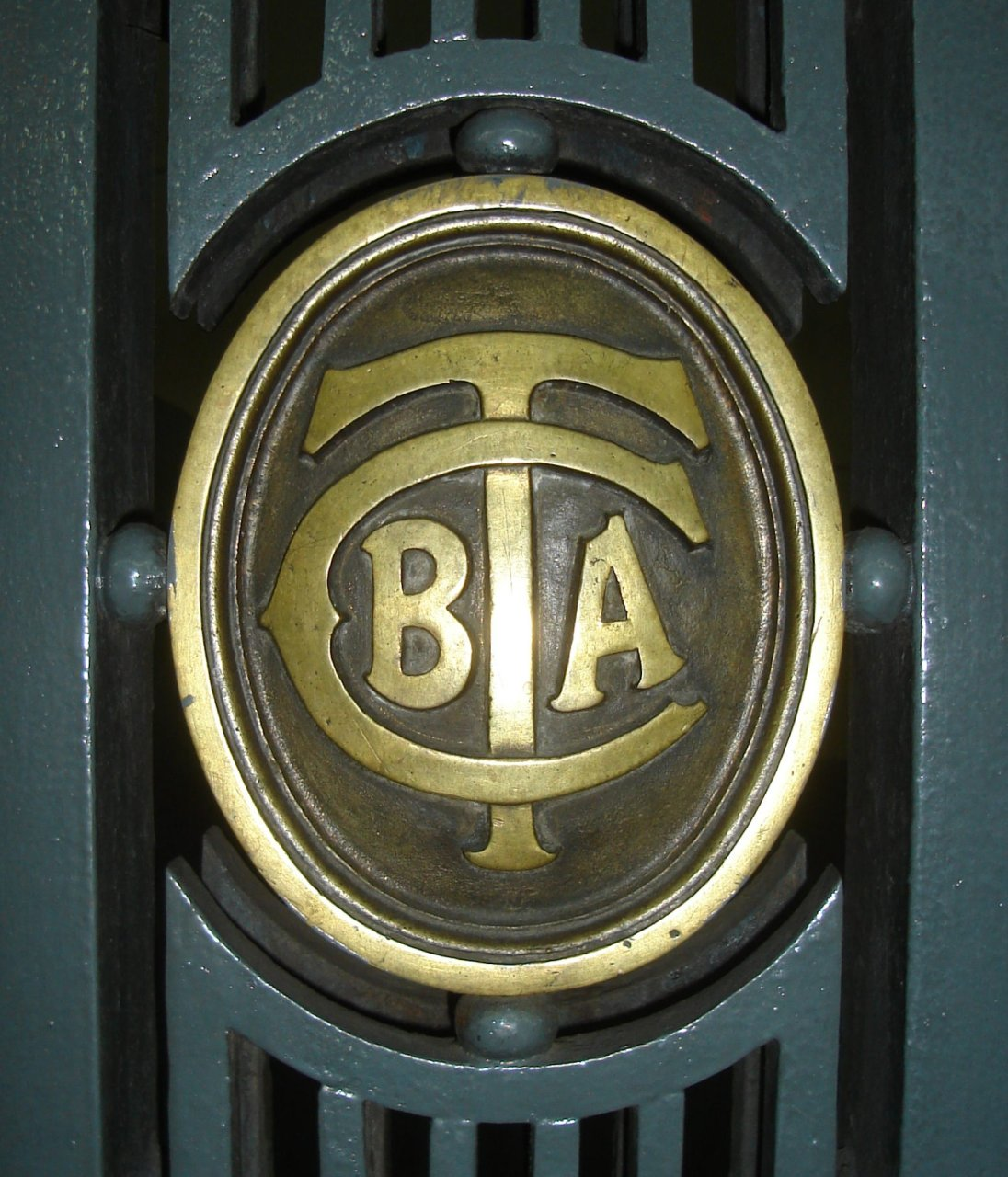
Terminal Central de Buenos Aires bronze plaque in Federico Lacroze railway station

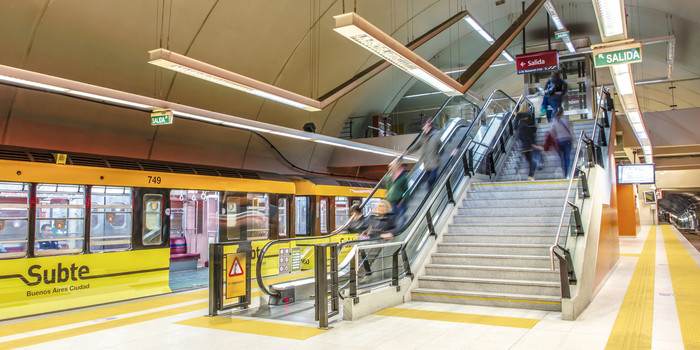
Eidan 500 train at Juan Manuel de Rosas station

The construction was carried out by the Argentine builder Dwight P. Robinson & Cía, and the line was called Ferrocarril Terminal Central de Buenos Aires (Buenos Aires Central Terminal Railroad). The first section between Federico Lacroze and Callao opened on 17 October 1930 and was 7.021 km (4.363 mi) in length. The Argentine President, José Félix Uriburu, travelled on the maiden journey.

On 22 June 1931, Line B was extended to Carlos Pellegrini station. The line was finally completed on 1 December 1931 when the subway reached the Leandro N. Alem station. These three sections were located below Corrientes Avenue, including 19 curves and 13 stations.

Depending to the depth of the line, some sections were constructed using an open trench (cut-and-cover method) or gallery or tunnel. The open trench approach was used in constructing the Federico Lacroze, Dorrego, Canning (now Malabia), Río de Janeiro (now Ángel Gallardo) and Medrano stations. The tunnel at Maipu Street reached a maximum depth of 17 metres (56 ft). Underneath the Rancagua (today Los Andes) park in Chacarita, a workshop and a 10 track garage (with capacity for 110 cars) were built.

Line B had escalators and turnstiles for the payment of coin-operated service, initially manufactured in the United States, formerly controlled by guards. Line B is deeper underground than Line A, and like it, each station was decorated with friezes of characteristic colours.

An underground link with the Mercado Central de Abasto (a wholesale fruit and vegetable market) was opened on 12 July 1933, through which goods wagons with freight from the Ferrocarril Central de Buenos Aires (Buenos Aires Central Railroad) would arrive, driven by electric locomotives. This service ceased after a fire occurred on the link on 27 November 1952.

The line always had an automatic light signalling system. In 1980 the mechanical stop-gear devices were replaced by magnetic induction devices, and in 1998 they were finally replaced by an electronic system with Automatic Train Protection (ATP). The original tracks were replaced, and a new automatic signal system with automatic train protection was installed and the transformers were changed to ones that did not contain PCBs, a carcinogenic chemical.

The modernisation carried out from 1996 by the private concessionaire Metrovías brought about a radical change in the appearance of the stations, covering the walls of both the platforms and the halls with asphalt-type material painted black and ochre in most cases, except for Callao and Carlos Gardel which were decorated with white tiles with black veins. As a result, the previous coloured friezes that embellished the stations and gave them their characteristic touch were covered.

On 9 August 9, 2003, two new stations, Tronador - Villa Ortúzar and De los Incas - Parque Chas, were inaugurated, allowing the line to transport more than 300,000 passengers per business day.

== Recent expansion and refurbishment ==
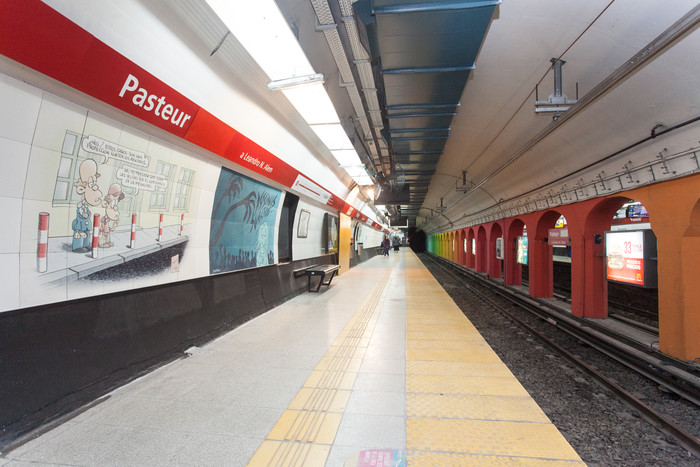
Overhead lines were added for the CAF 6000 trains.

In 2013 Line B was extended underground further west (2 km (1.2 mi)) from Los Incas/Parque Chas to Echeverría and Juan Manuel de Rosas (previously named Villa Urquiza) where transfer to the Ferrocarril Mitre line was provided. The new stations opened on 26 July 2013.

Further plans include: installation of a new signal system, acquisition of new cars, construction of a new central workshop for the repair of machinery, widening of platforms, hallways and all areas of pedestrian traffic at stations and at transfer nodes, improvements in transfer centres with other means of transport.

Some refurbishment on the line has come under criticism, mostly due to the overwhelming colour of the new murals, but also due to alleged cases where the historic artwork of the line has been destroyed during the line's modernisation.

== Rolling stock ==
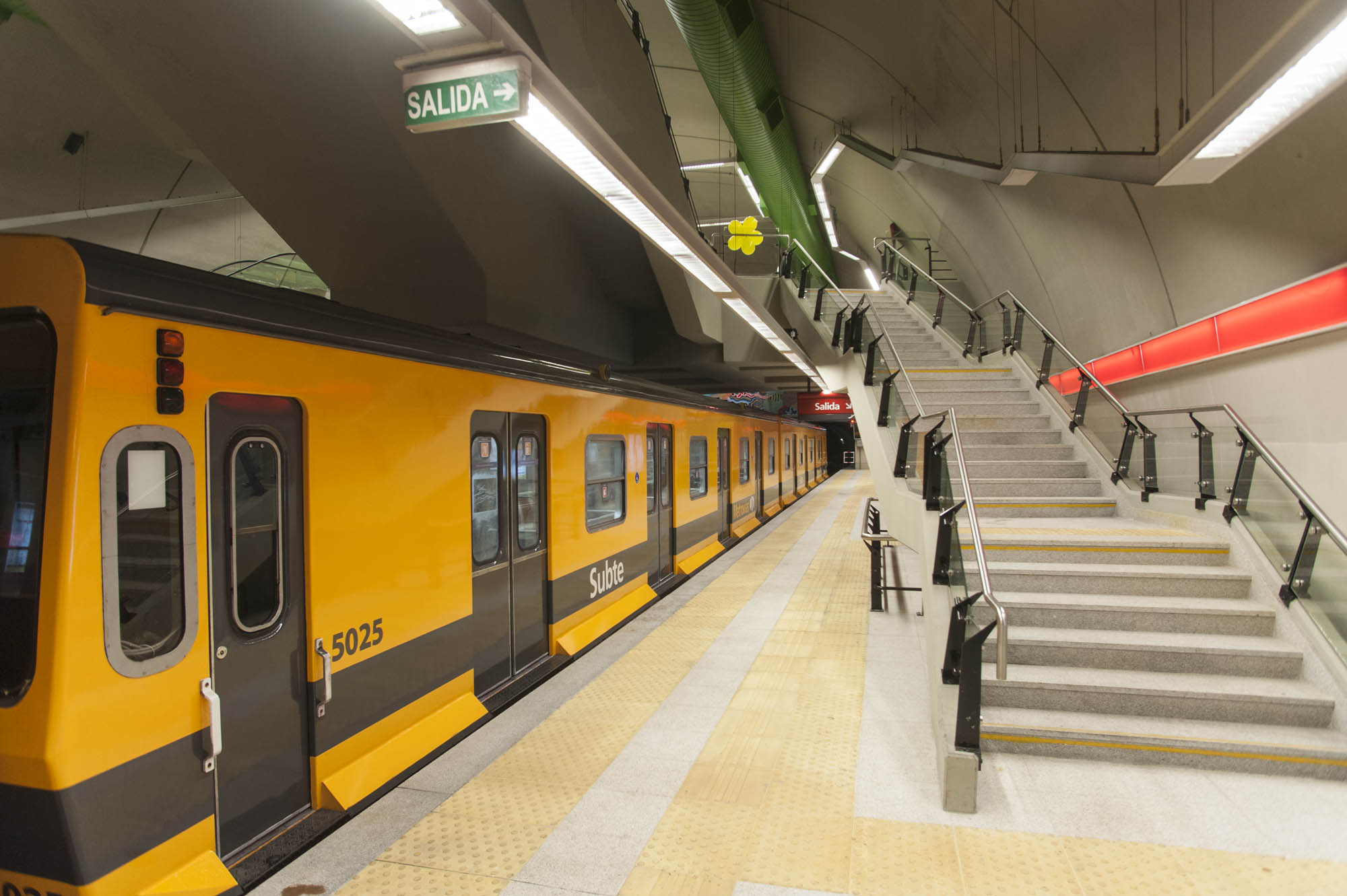
CAF 5000 train at Echeverría station

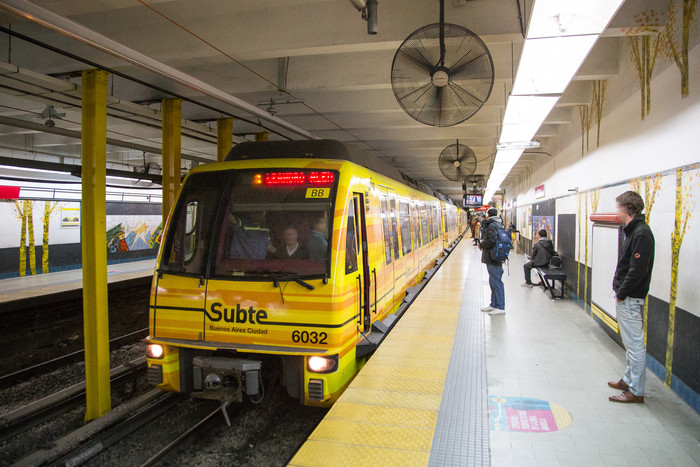
Controversial new CAF 6000 rolling stock

Initially, the Line B had 56 English Metropolitan Cammell cars, with metal bodywork and two bogies, painted cream and red and with a capacity of 47 seated people. Each car had 3 double-leaf sliding doors on each side, at platform height, whose opening and closing was controlled by the guard, and had two 105 HP motors. Then 20 North American Osgood-Bradley cars were added. Between 1965 and 1967, 14 similar cars were purchased from Fabricaciones Militares, and between 1977 and 1979, 20 units with 195 HP Siemens engines.

In 1995, the replacement of the existing fleet began and in 1996 128 second-hand Japanese Tokyo Metro (formerly Eidan Subway) 300/400/500/900 rail cars were purchased that were in excellent condition.

In 2009, it was announced that the Madrid Metro has sold its oldest wide-profile trains to Buenos Aires. The CAF 5000 series trains, which were in operation in Madrid since 1974, entered service in 2013 to replace some of the Eidan 300/400/500/900 sets that were utilized on line B starting in 1996. In operation, the 5000 series sets proved problematic, particularly with electrical issues, and were temporarily removed from service in late 2016 in response to brake-related safety concerns. Although slowly reinstated starting in 2017, the 5000 series sets were permanently withdrawn less than a year later, following the discovery of asbestos in some cars' electrical components.

In July 2013, Madrid Metro sold 73 of its 6000 series cars (which entered service in Madrid in 1998) to Buenos Aires for €32.6 million in exchange for the retirement of the rest of the Japanese-built trains. The purchase of the CAF 6000 rolling stock was met with major criticism due to the need for large and expensive alterations to accommodate the new rolling stock that was poorly adapted for Line B.

Due to the 6000 series cars using overhead lines for power collection, in contrast to the existing and functional third rail electrification system of Line B, a new solid overhead catenary system had to be installed. The new overhead power collection system turned out be insufficient in powering the 6000 series cars resulting in the cars operating at reduced performance leading to lower acceleration. The trains were significantly narrower than the Line B's original loading gauge necessitating the need for modifications to the trains to reduce the large platform gap. These alterations made the second-hand units not any cheaper than simply purchasing new rolling stock, as was done with the 200 Series on Line A. The rolling stock suburban interior design was a poor fit for the urban Line B. The seating was arranged as transverse seating, designed for long distance comfort with limited standing room which is a poor fit to Line B's typically short passenger trips with high passenger turnover at each station. The trains also were not completely walk through train sets as they were organised into married pairs. These factors and the narrow width of the train cars themselves led to very poor internal passenger circulation. The shorter cars meant that a 6000 series six car train made poor use of the existing platform length compared to older six car trains. These factors led to the new 6000 series rolling stock having a much smaller passenger capacity compared to the existing rolling stock.

As of 2020, the remaining Eidan 300/400/500/900 sets are the oldest rapid transit cars that remain in operation in the world; the remaining cars are expected to be retired in the mid-2020s.

== Events and highlights ==
- When excavation was carried out for construction of the Leandro Alem station, the remains of a Mammoth of the Quaternary period where found, which were sent to the Museum of Natural Sciences of La Plata.
- Line B connects through a ramp at Federico Lacroze into the electrified track of the Urquiza Line, where the underground rolling stock heads to the Urquiza Railway workshops in Ruben Darío (Hurlingham) for wheel, gear and axle maintenance.
- Florida and Carlos Pellegrini stations are the two busiest stations on the line, as most commuters alight there in the morning to work in the downtown financial district. They also provide easy access to the entertainment district in the evening (see also Florida Street).
- Carlos Pellegrini station can be reached from an underground commercial gallery located right below the Obelisco landmark, used by pedestrians to avoid crossing 9 de Julio Avenue at street level.
- Since the 1940s, the line used to end in Federico Lacroze Station, near Chacarita Cemetery, where commuters could board the suburban bound Urquiza Line. In the 1990s, work began to expand the line to Villa Ortúzar and Villa Urquiza.

== Gallery ==
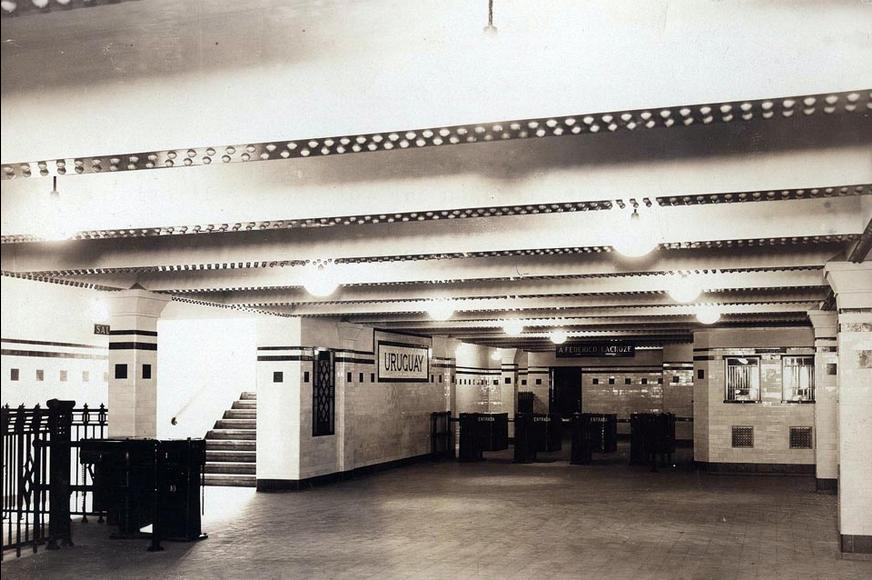
Uruguay station hall (1931)

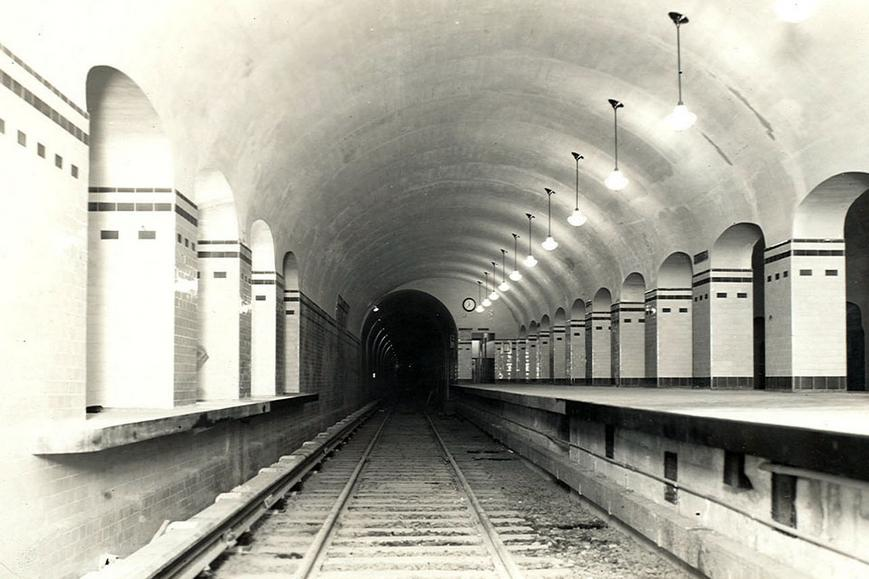
Carlos Pellegrini station (1931)

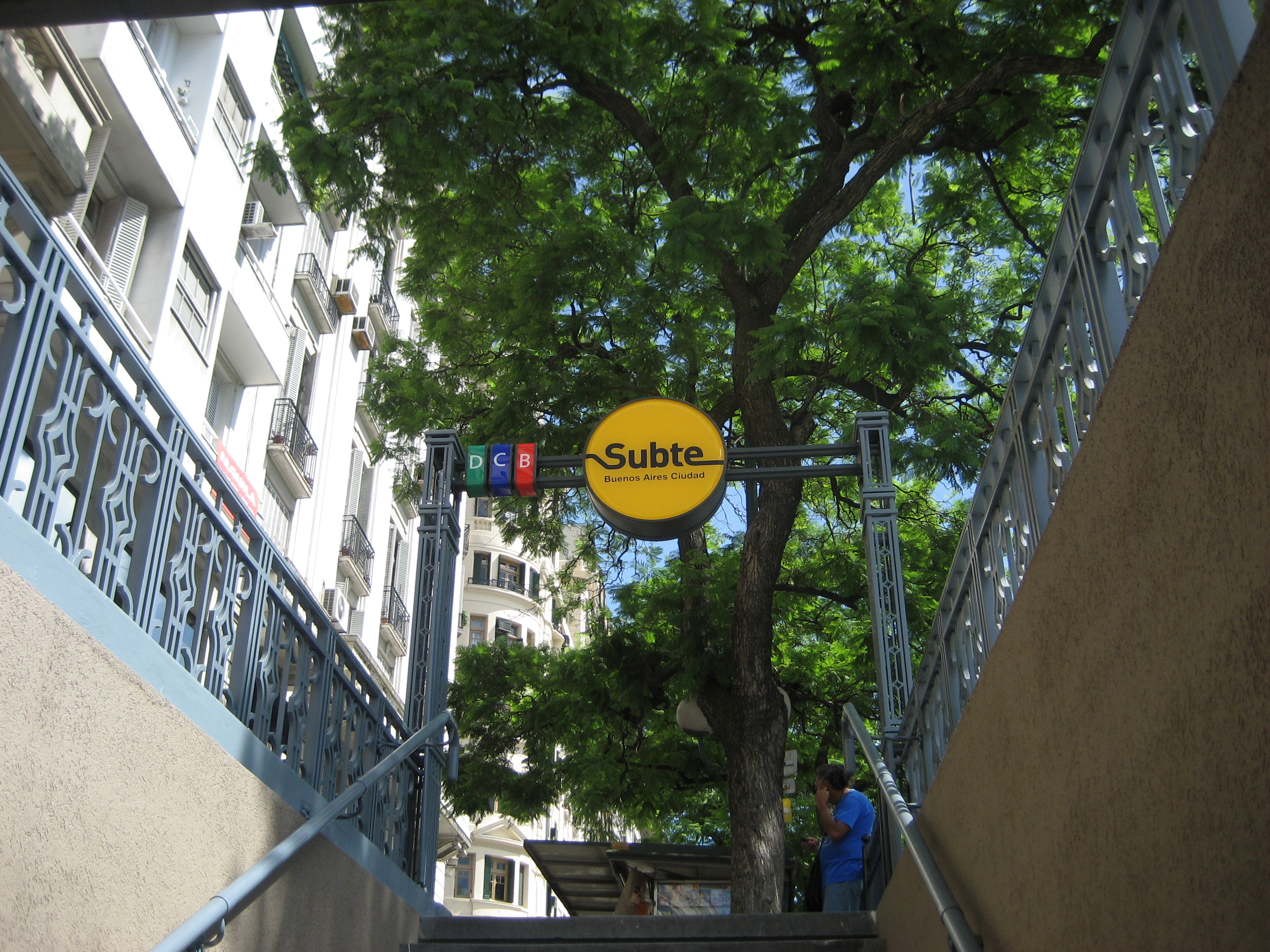
Exit from the Obelisco commercial gallery

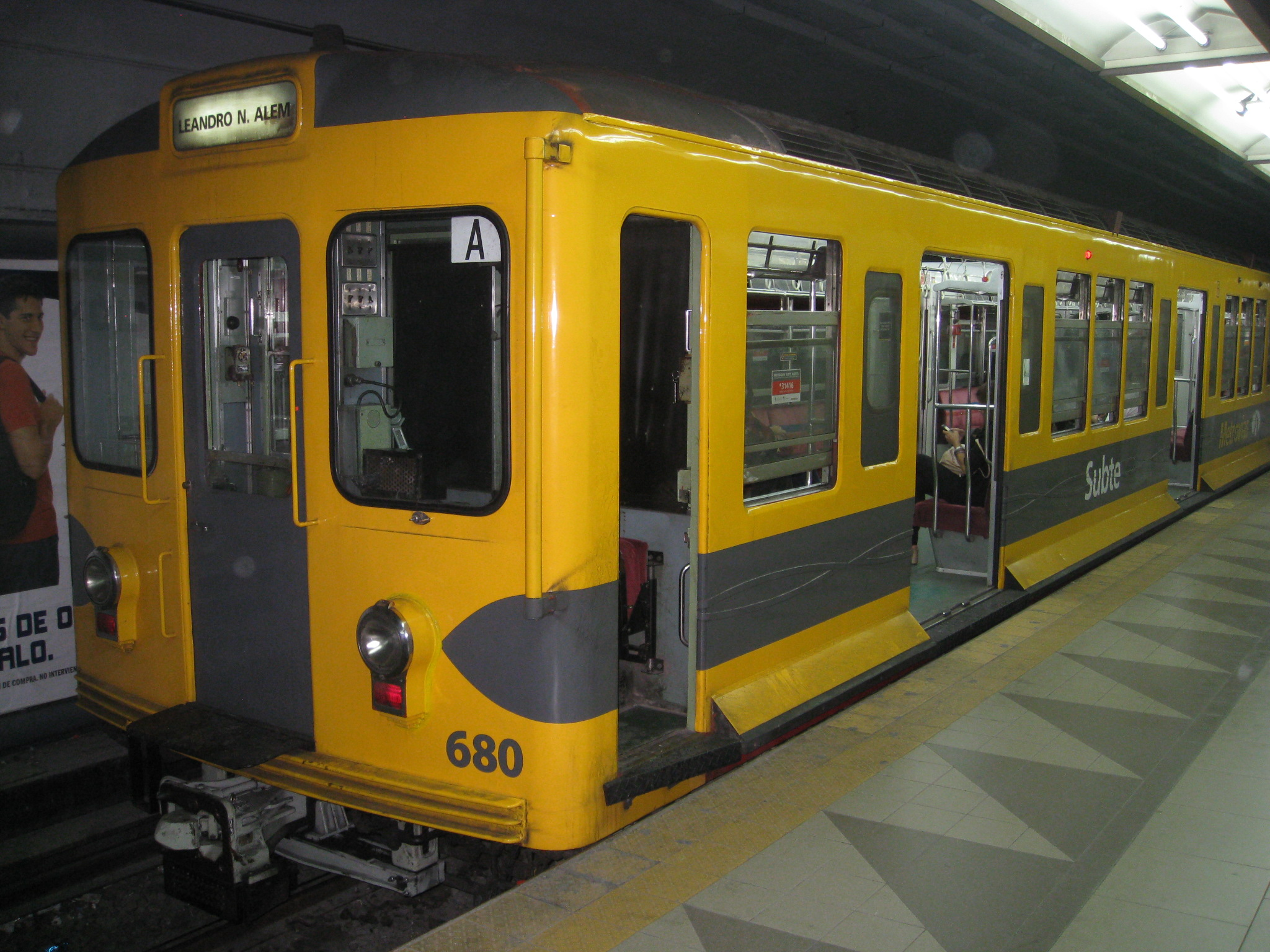
Eidan 500, formerly used on Tokyo Metro Marunouchi Line
