= Juan Manuel de Rosas (Buenos Aires Underground) =

Buenos Aires Underground station

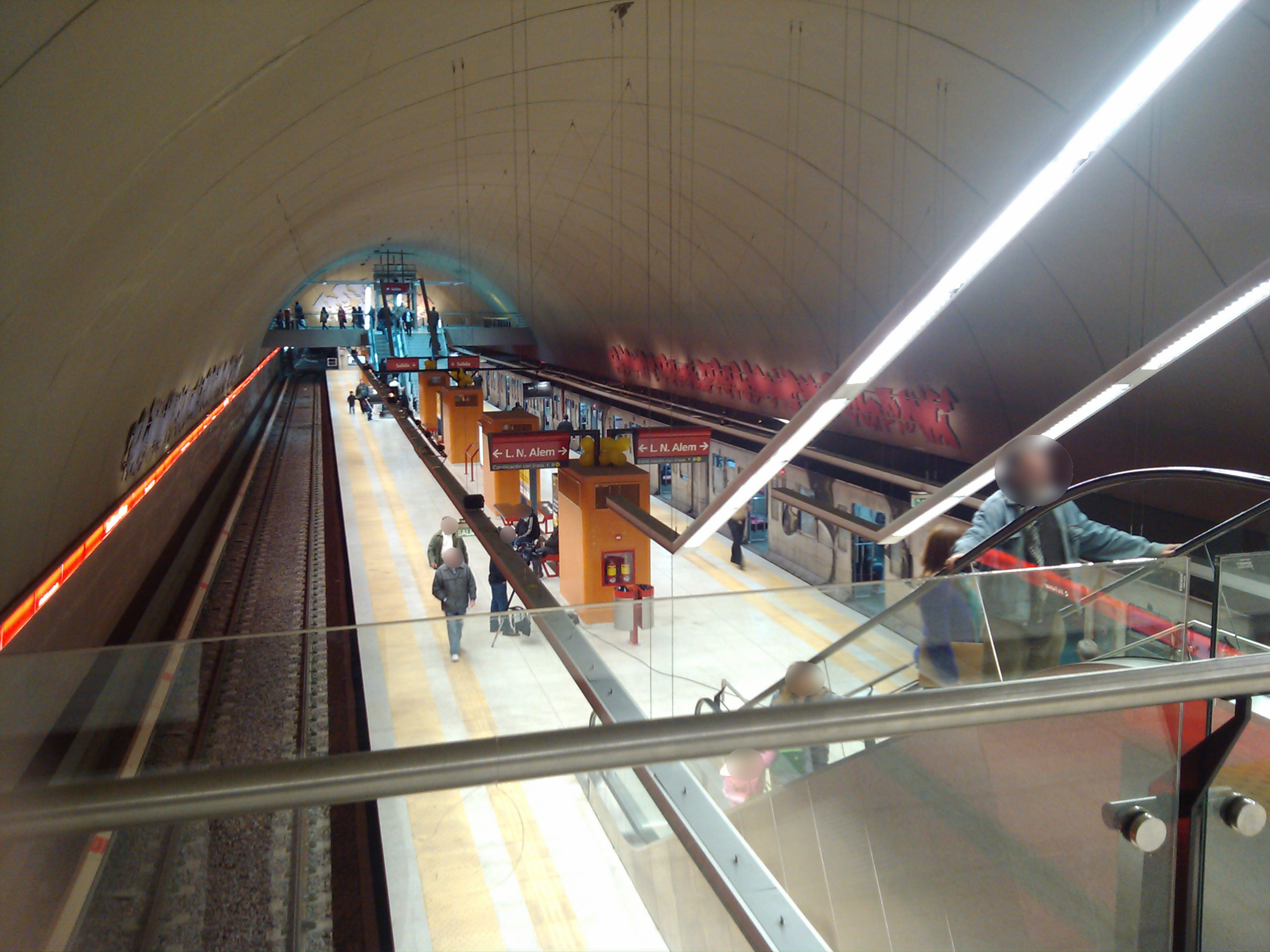

General information
- Location: Triunvirato and Monroe
- Coordinates: 34°34′26″S 58°29′12″W
- Platforms: Island platforms
- Connections: Mitre Line

History
- Opened: July 26, 2013

Services
Preceding station	Buenos Aires Underground	Following station
Terminus	Line B	Echeverría towards Leandro N. Alem
Location

Juan Manuel de Rosas - Villa Urquiza is a terminus station on Line B of the Buenos Aires Underground. It is placed beneath Avenida Triunvirato, between Avenida Monroe and Avenida Franklin D. Roosevelt, in the Villa Urquiza barrio, and is an important transfer center with General Urquiza station in the Ferrocarril General Bartolomé Mitre. It is named after Juan Manuel de Rosas, a politician, army officer and caudillo who ruled the Argentine Confederation almost uninterruptedly from 1829 until 1852.

The station opened for use on July 26, 2013 as part of the extension of the line from Los Incas - Parque Chas. It had previously been planned to open in 2011. It also connects with General Urquiza station on the Mitre Line commuter rail service.
