= Leandro N. Alem–Correo Central (Buenos Aires Underground) =

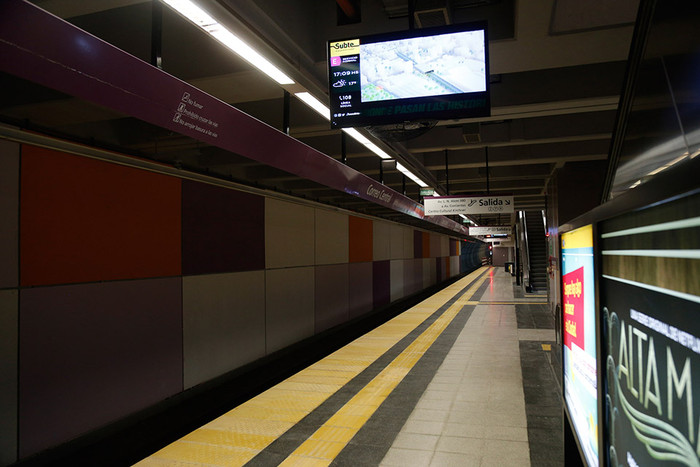
- Line E platform in 2019

General information
- Location: Leandro N. Alem and Corrientes
- Coordinates: 34°36′11″S 58°22′13″W
- Platforms: 1 island platform (Line B); 1 island platform (Line E)
- Tracks: 4

Construction
- Accessible: Line E only

History
- Opened: 1 December 1931 (Line B); 3 June 2019 (Line E)

Services
Preceding station	Buenos Aires Underground	Following station
Florida towards Juan Manuel de Rosas	Line B	Terminus
Bolívar towards Plaza de los Virreyes	Line E	Catalinas towards Retiro
Location

Leandro N. Alem and Correo Central are two stations on the Buenos Aires Underground that serve as a station complex. Leandro N. Alem station is the eastern terminus of Line B, and Correo Central is a station on Line E. The platforms of Line B opened on 1 December 1931 as part of an extension of that line from Carlos Pellegrini, while the platforms of Line E opened on 3 June 2019 as part of an extension of that line from Bolívar to Retiro.

The Corrientes tram stop on the Tranvía del Este, which was located adjacent to the station complex, operated from July 2007 to October 2012, when the line ceased operations due to low ridership.

== Overview ==
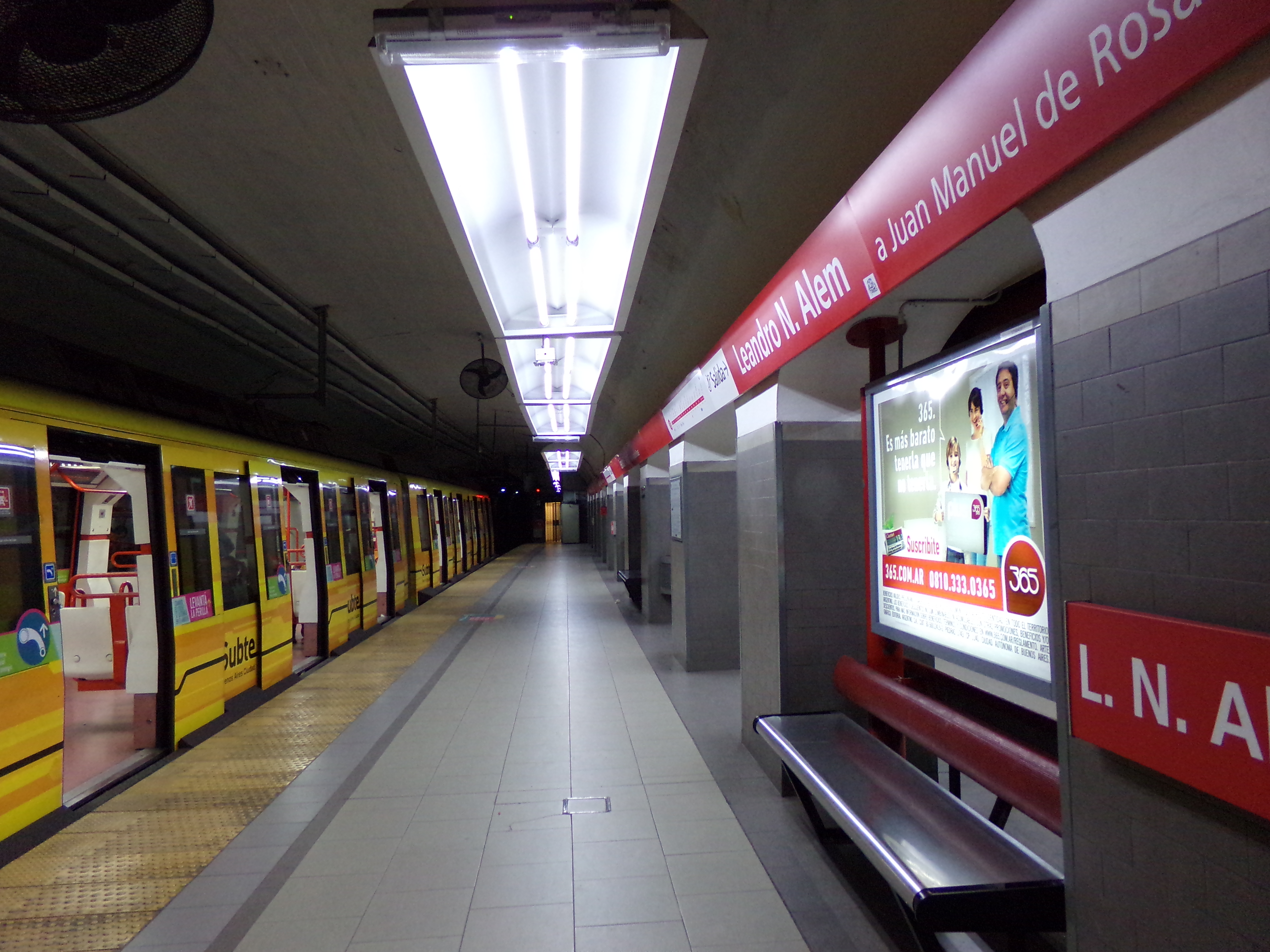
Line B platform in 2016

The stations are located at the intersection of Corrientes and Leandro Alem, near the Luna Park stadium and the Puerto Madero district, and is a short walk from Plaza de Mayo. The Line B station is named after Argentine politician Leandro N. Alem and is situated at the bottom of a steep incline at sea level; hence the name el bajo (the lowlands), which is historically linked to the bars and night clubs that were in the area at the time of the station's 1931 opening. The zone has been mostly for office buildings since the 1950s.

The Line E station, Correo Central, is situated 17 m (56 ft) below Leandro N. Alem due to the station's location near the original coast of the Río de la Plata. Although Correo Central was expected to open in August 2012 as a temporary terminus for line E, the station's opening was postponed as a result of construction-related issues in other areas of line E's extension from Bolívar to Retiro. By mid-2013, Correo Central was 90% complete, with most of the completed work being structural; however, its elevators and escalators would not be completed until sometime after the installation of the station's electrical substation in May 2015. Correo Central would ultimately open on 3 June 2019, together with the other stations of the extension of Line E from Bolívar to Retiro.

While Correo Central was under construction, Leandro N. Alem received a renovation in 2014 which involved artwork from artist Ignacio De Lucca.
