= Avenida La Plata (Buenos Aires Underground) =

Buenos Aires Underground station

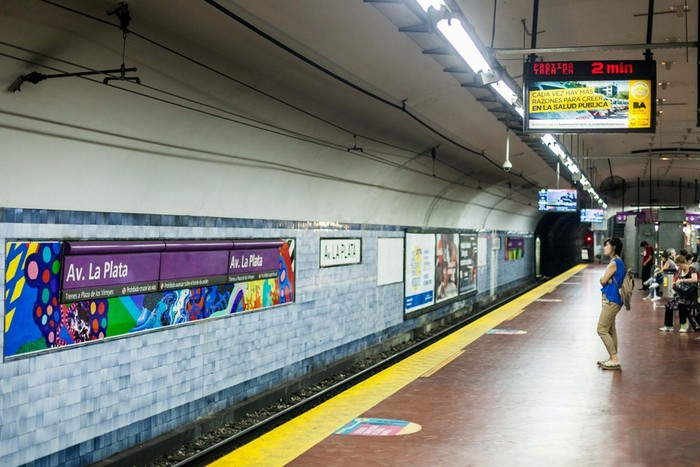

General information
- Location: Directorio 1
- Coordinates: 34°37′37.1″S 58°25′35.1″W
- Platforms: Island platforms

History
- Opened: 24 April 1966

Services
| Preceding station | Buenos Aires Underground | Following station |
|---|---|---|
| José María Moreno towards Plaza de los Virreyes | Line E | Boedo towards Retiro |
Location

Avenida La Plata is a station on Line E of the Buenos Aires Underground located at the intersection of Avenida Directorio and Avenida La Plata, at the limit between Caballito and Boedo. The station was used as a set in the 1996 Argentine science fiction film Moebius. It was opened on 24 April 1966 as the western terminus of a one station extension from Boedo. On 23 June 1973 the line was extended further west to José María Moreno.
