= Boedo (Buenos Aires Underground) =

Buenos Aires Underground station

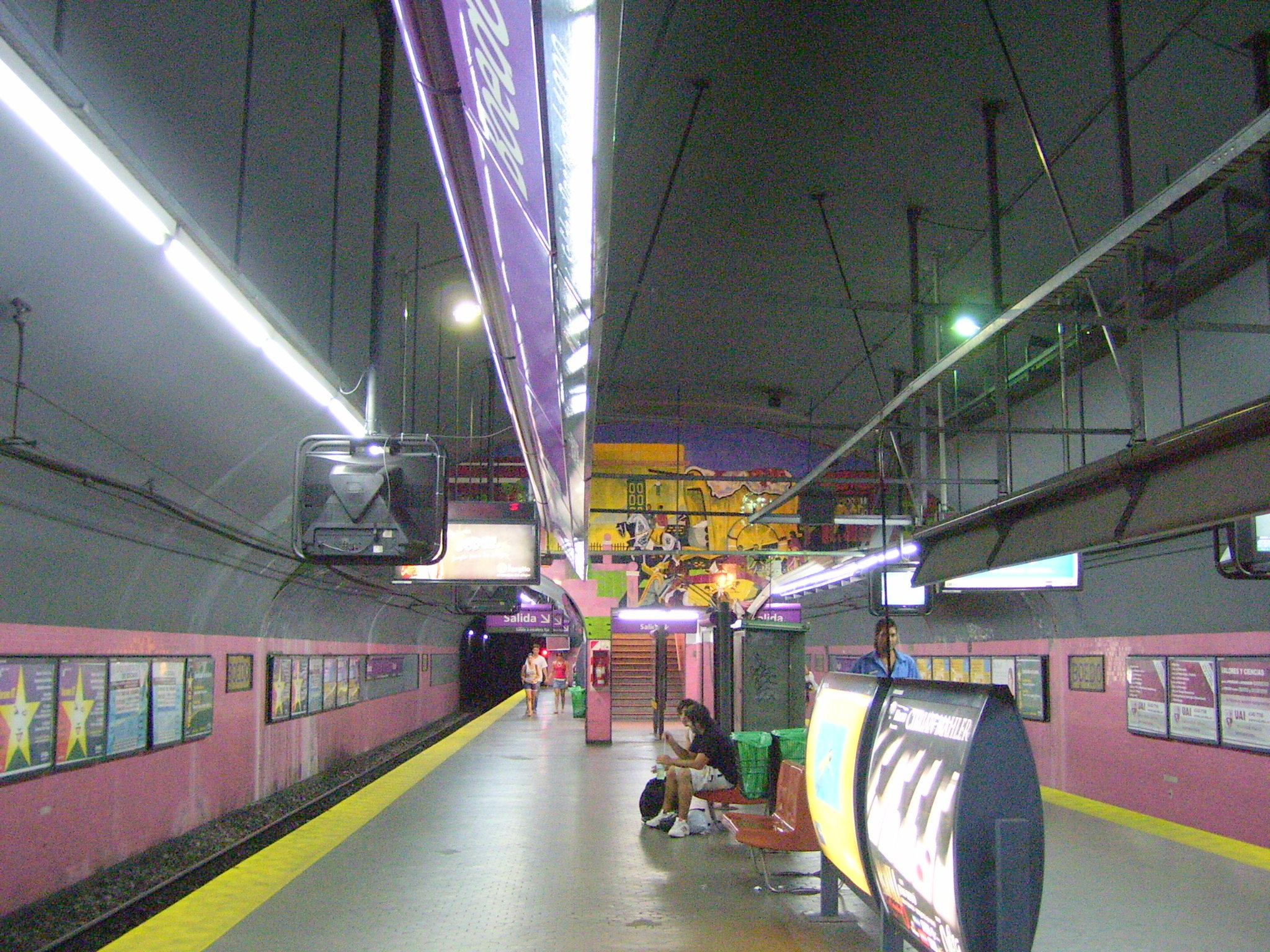

General information
- Location: San Juan 3500
- Coordinates: 34°37′31.2″S 58°24′55.6″W
- Platforms: Island platforms

History
- Opened: 9 December 1960

Services
Preceding station	Buenos Aires Underground	Following station
Avenida La Plata towards Plaza de los Virreyes	Line E	General Urquiza towards Retiro
Location

Boedo is a station on Line E of the Buenos Aires Underground located at the intersection of San Juan and Boedo avenues. The area is known for tango dance.

The station was opened on 16 December 1944 as a one station extension from General Urquiza. However, a temporary platform was in operation, and the current station was only opened on 9 December 1960. On 24 April 1966, the line was extended to Avenida La Plata.
