= Catalinas (Buenos Aires Underground) =

Buenos Aires Underground station

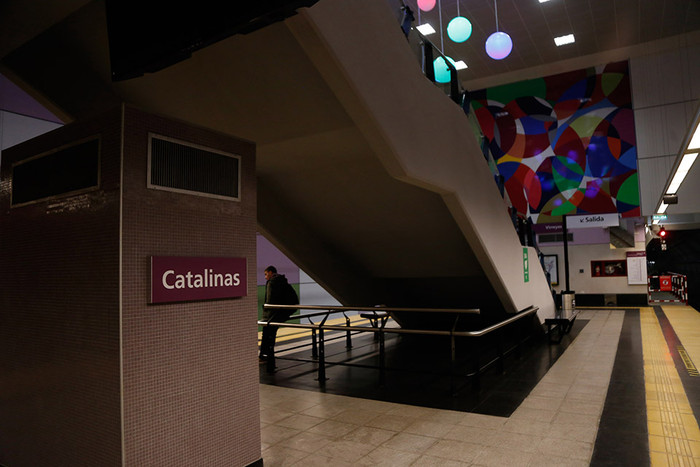

General information
- Location: Leandro N. Alem and Paraguay
- Coordinates: 34°35′47.4″S 58°22′18.1″W
- Platforms: Side platforms

History
- Opened: 3 June 2019

Services
Preceding station	Buenos Aires Underground	Following station
Correo Central towards Plaza de los Virreyes	Line E	Retiro Terminus
Location

Catalinas is a station on Line E of the Buenos Aires Underground. The station was opened on 3 June 2019 as part of the extension of the line from Bolívar to Retiro.
