= San José (Buenos Aires Underground) =

Buenos Aires Underground station

General information
- Location: San Juan 1400
- Coordinates: 34°37′20.4″S 58°23′6.5″W
- Platforms: Island platforms

History
- Opened: 24 April 1966

Services
Preceding station	Buenos Aires Underground	Following station
Entre Ríos/Rodolfo Walsh towards Plaza de los Virreyes	Line E	Independencia towards Retiro
Location

San José is a station on Line E of the Buenos Aires Underground. The old station San José vieja was closed the year the current station opened, after the line was re-routed from Constitucion railway station to its current trajectory. The station was opened on 20 June 1944 as the eastern terminus of the inaugural section of the line from San José to General Urquiza. On 24 April 1966 the line was extended further east to Bolívar.

In December 2014, murals representing scenes and dialogues from the Argentine film Moebius (which used the station as one of the locations of the film) were set up at the station.
