= José María Moreno (Buenos Aires Underground) =

Buenos Aires Underground station

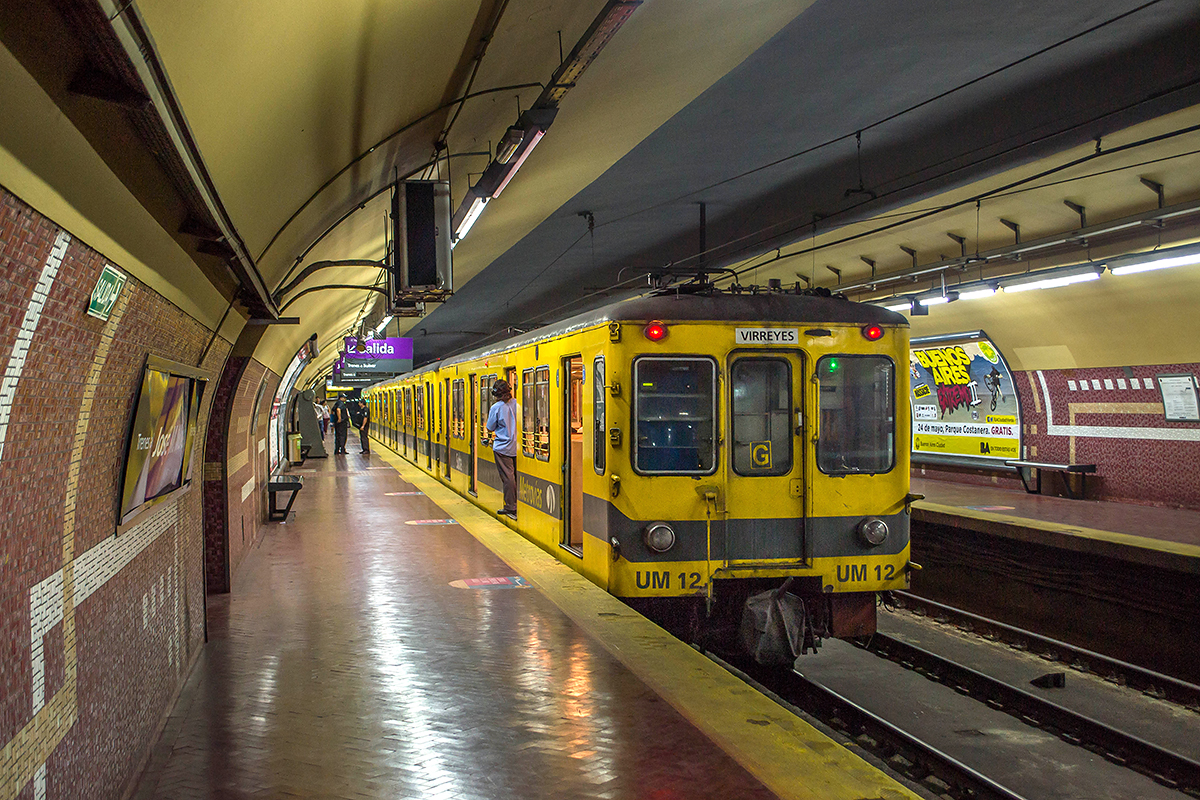

General information
- Location: Directorio 400
- Coordinates: 34°37′40.8″S 58°26′1.6″W
- Platforms: Side platforms

History
- Opened: 23 June 1973

Services
Preceding station	Buenos Aires Underground	Following station
Emilio Mitre towards Plaza de los Virreyes	Line E	Avenida La Plata towards Retiro
Location

José María Moreno is a station on Line E of the Buenos Aires Underground. The station was opened on 23 June 1973 as the western terminus of a one station extension from Avenida La Plata. On 7 October 1985, the line was extended to Emilio Mitre.
