= General Urquiza (Buenos Aires Underground) =

Buenos Aires Underground station

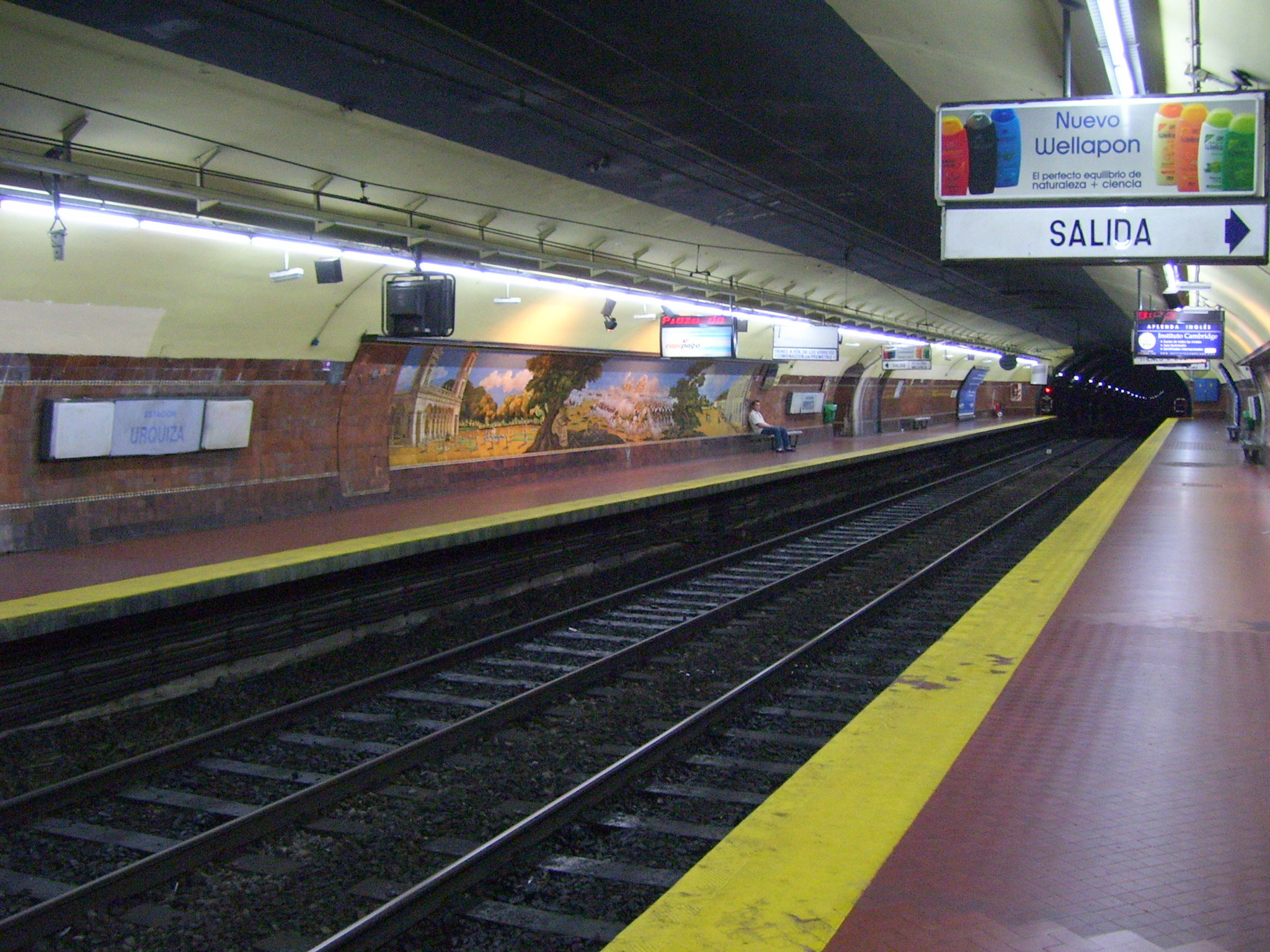

General information
- Location: San Juan 3100
- Coordinates: 34°37′28.8″S 58°24′34″W
- Platforms: Side platforms

History
- Opened: 20 June 1944

Services
Preceding station	Buenos Aires Underground	Following station
Boedo towards Plaza de los Virreyes	Line E	Jujuy towards Retiro
Location

General Urquiza is a station on Line E of the Buenos Aires Underground. The station was opened on 20 June 1944 as the eastern terminus of the inaugural section of the line from San José to General Urquiza. On 16 December 1944 the line was extended to Boedo.
