= Line E (Buenos Aires Underground) =

Rapid transit line of Buenos Aires

Line E

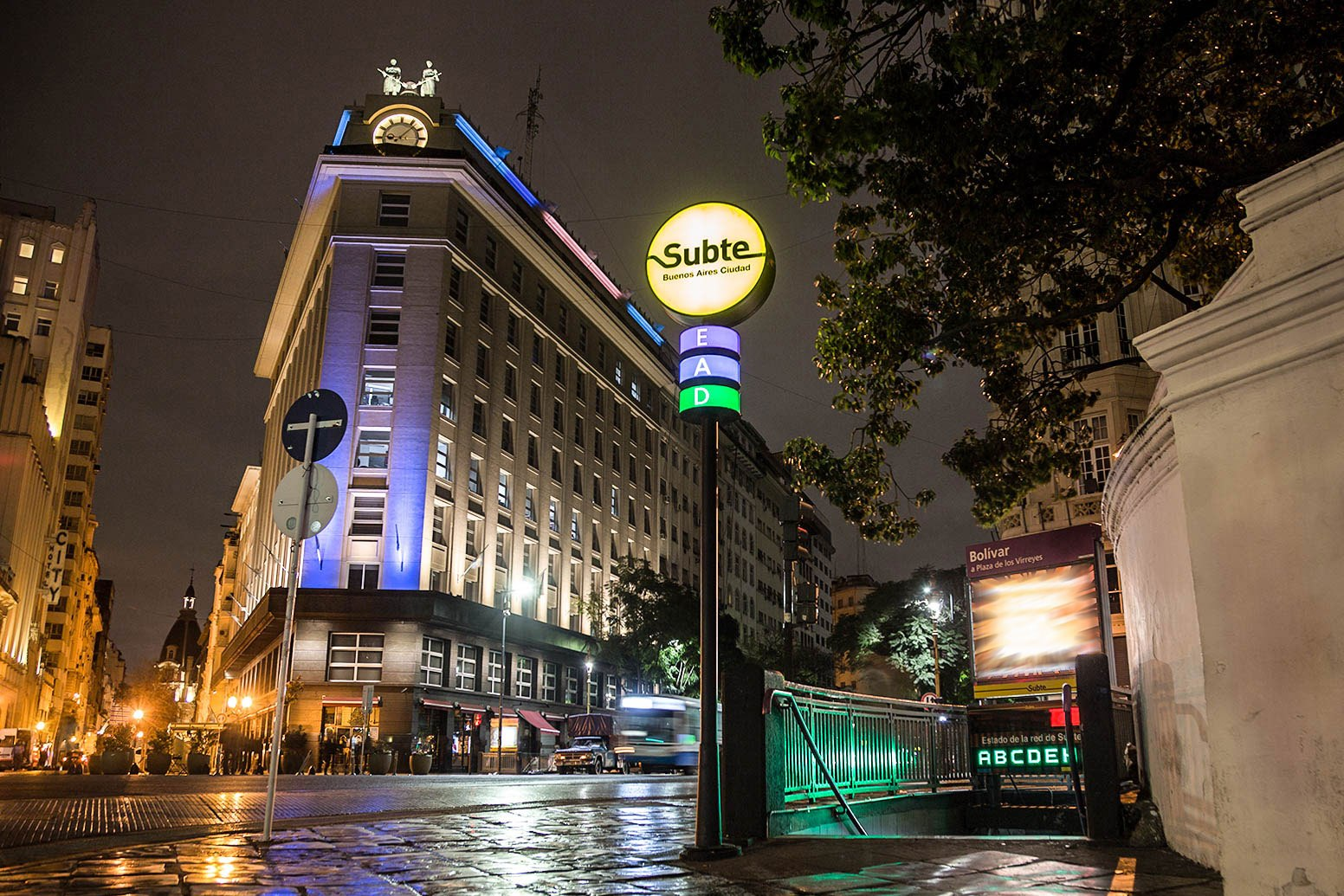
- Entrance to Bolívar station

Overview
- Termini: Retiro; Plaza de los Virreyes
- Stations: 18

Service
- Type: Rapid transit
- System: Buenos Aires Underground
- Operator(s): Emova
- Rolling stock: 100 series · Fiat-Materfer
- Daily ridership: 53,237 (2024)

History
- Opened: 20 June 1944; 81 years ago
- Last extension: 2019

Technical
- Line length: 12 km (7.5 mi)
- Character: Underground
- Track gauge: 1,435 mm (4 ft 8 1/2 in)
- Electrification: Overhead line, 1,500 V DC

Line E of the Buenos Aires Underground runs from Retiro to Plaza de los Virreyes, a total distance of 12 km. Opened in 1944, the Line E was the last completely new line to be added to the Buenos Aires Underground, until 2007 when Line H was opened. The line has a history of being re-routed and extended due to having been historically the line with the lowest passenger numbers on the network.

== History ==
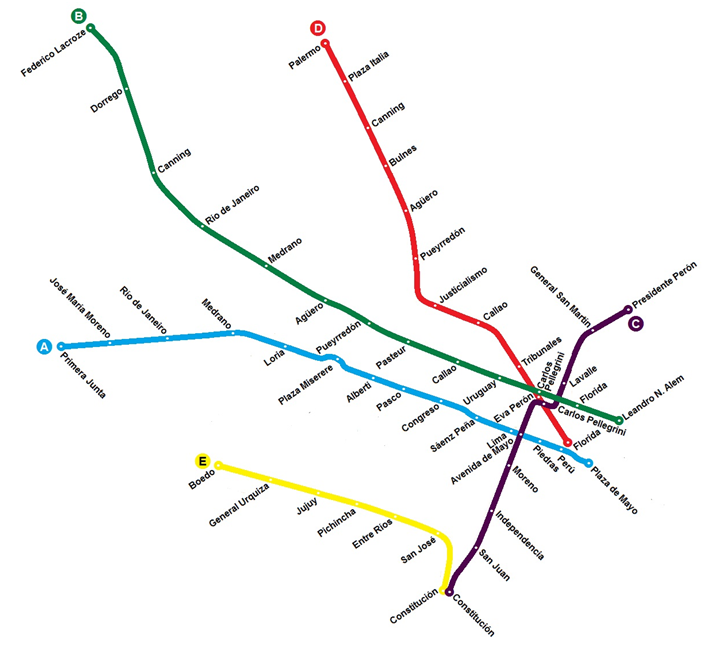
1955

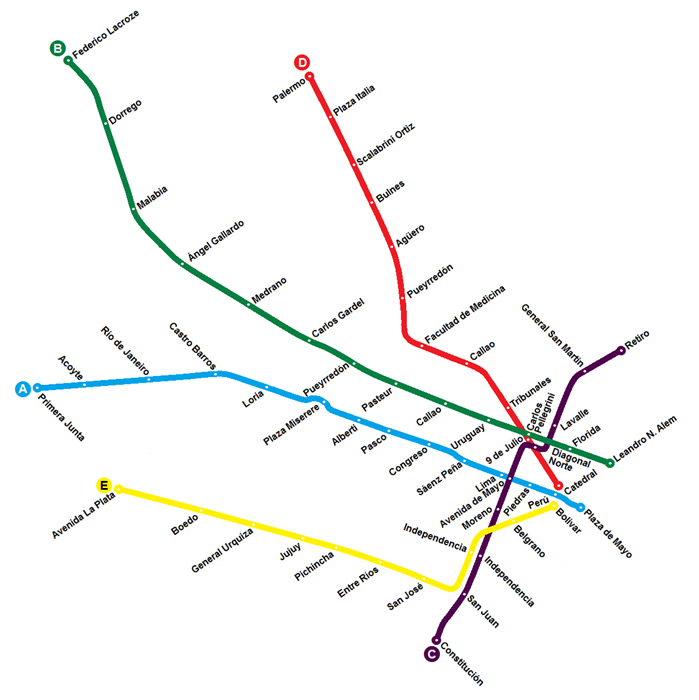
1966

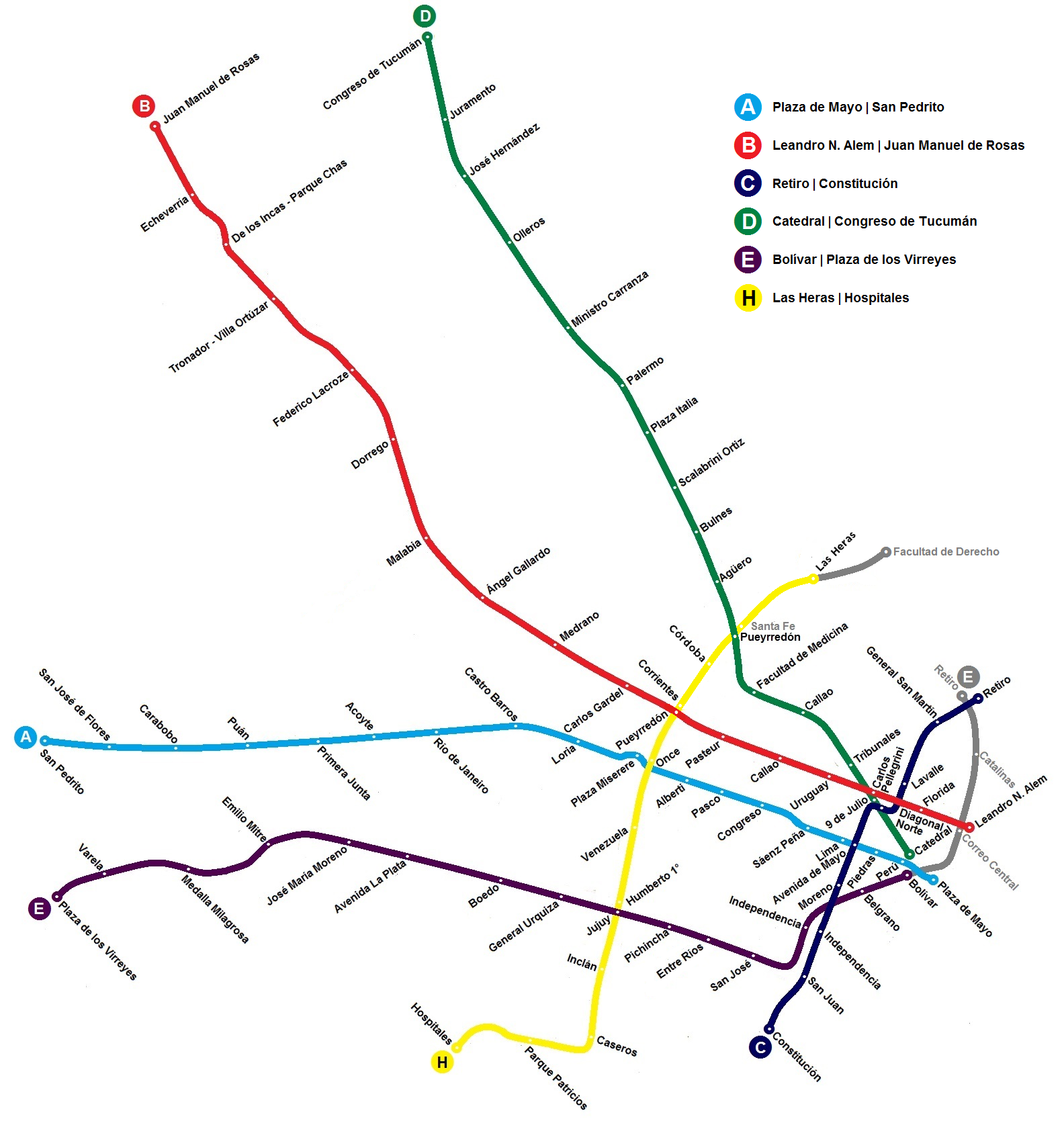
2015

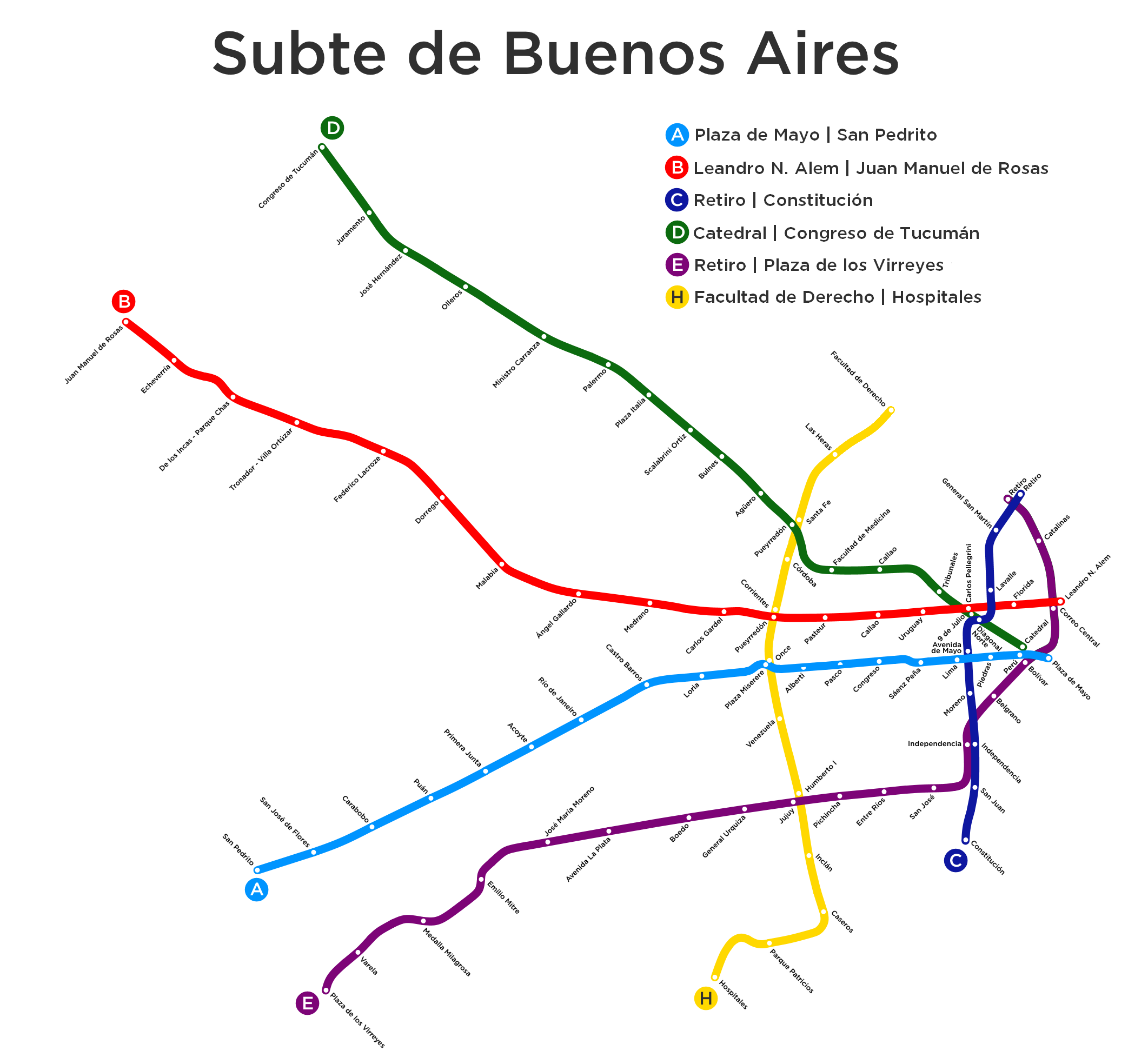
2019

Line E was opened on 20 June 1944, after construction began in 1938, with an original route that ran from Constitución railway station to General Urquiza. Soon after, it was decided to abandon the terminus at Constitución (which also served as the connection with Line C) and instead reroute the line towards the Plaza de Mayo.

Work began in 1957, and in 1966 the San José, Independencia, Belgrano and Plaza de Mayo (now Bolívar) stations were opened to the public by president Arturo Umberto Illia. For many years, the two stations that had been closed as a result of the Line E re-route remained unused until the mid-1990s when one was converted into a workshop to service the rolling stock of the line.

The line was further extended in 1973 to José María Moreno and then again in 1985 to Plaza de los Virreyes. The PreMetro E2 tramway was completed in 1987 and was linked to Line E with the intention of connecting a larger Premetro network to the line, although this never materialised following privatisation.

Under the private operation of the Subte by Metrovías, the colour of the line was changed from yellow to purple during the 1990s. Purple had previously been used for Line C, while yellow is now used for Line H.

=== Extension to Retiro ===
As part of a general effort to extend the Buenos Aires Underground, it was decided to extend Line E from Bolívar to Retiro railway station (with intermediate stations at Catalinas and Correo Central) where it would re-connect with Line C and the Mitre Line, and eventually Line H when its extension was completed. By 2014, all the major structural works had been completed on the three new stations with the tracks and signalling systems still to be completed.

In July 2015, the City of Buenos Aires confirmed that, despite the advanced state of the works, the extension would not be opened until 2019 citing delays that came about as a result of the transfer of the works from the National Government to the City Government in 2012. The city completed the additional work required by the new deadline. On Monday 3 June 2019 the extension to Retiro was completed. The extension was expected to increase ridership on the line by 25%.

== Rolling stock ==
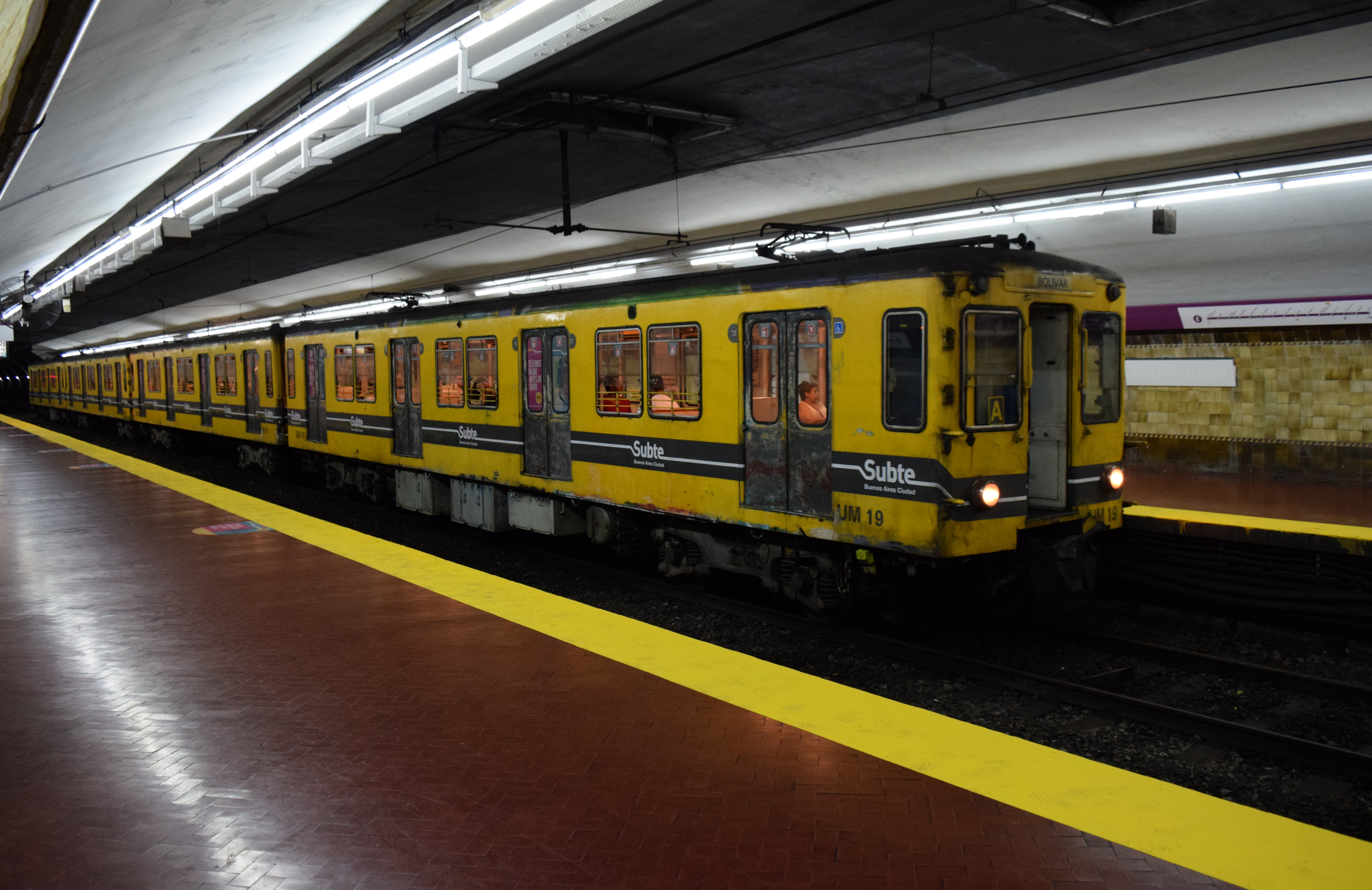
CAF-GEE rolling stock

The line originally used Siemens-Schuckert Orenstein & Koppel rolling stock during its inauguration and for many years after. However, this was later replaced by similar CAF-GEE rolling stock purchased in 1968 which served on the line until 2020, when they were retired In 2006, 64 of the CAF-GEE cars were to be refurbished, but this was ultimately abandoned.

In 2019, refurbished Alstom Metropolis 100 cars began to operate on Line E, after being displaced from Line D. These units have worked alongside the Fiat-Materfer fleet since then. The Alstom 100 fleet continued to transfer to Line E until 2024, comprising the vast majority of the line's rolling stock. Less than five Fiat-Materfer formations operate in regular service as of July 2024.

== Ghost stations ==
There are two ghost stations on the line – San José vieja and Constitución. These formed part of the line's original Line E route towards Constitución railway station until the line was re-routed in 1966. Both stations have been used as workshops and storage areas for the line's rolling stock. It has also been evaluated using the two stations and their corresponding tunnels as the southern part of Line F since that line's projected route in that area overlaps with the former Line E route.

San José vieja was used as a set for the 1996 Argentine film Moebius and served as the fictional Dock Sud and Parque stations.

== Gallery ==
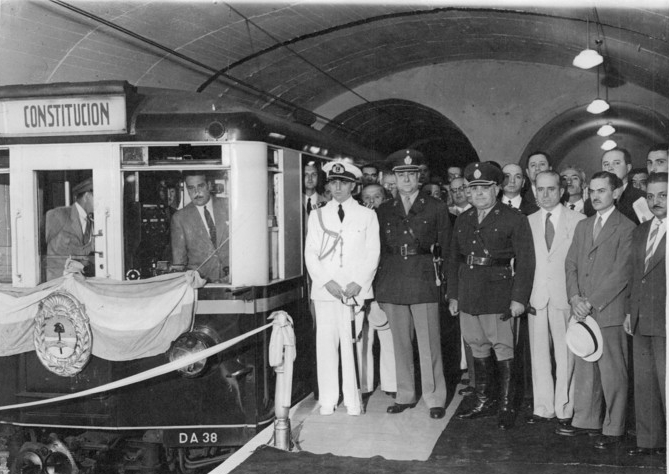
Temporary Boedo station being opened (1944)

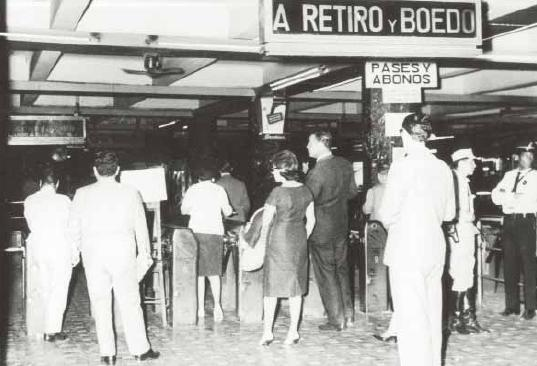
Passengers changing to Line C at the former Constitución station (c.1950s)

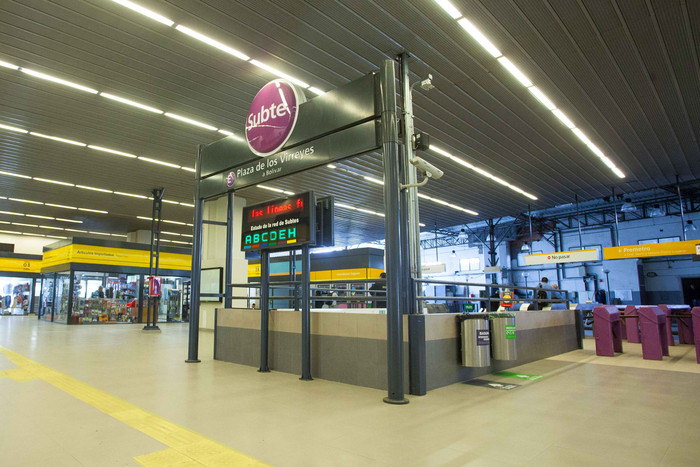
Entrance to Plaza de los Virreyes station at the Premetro's Intendente Saguier terminal.

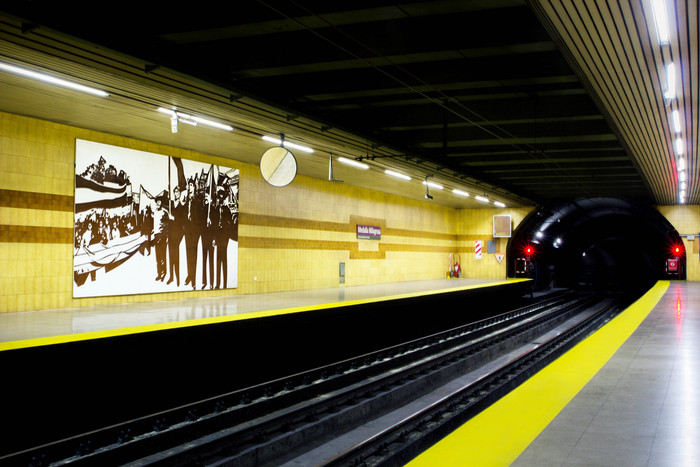
Medalla Milagrosa station

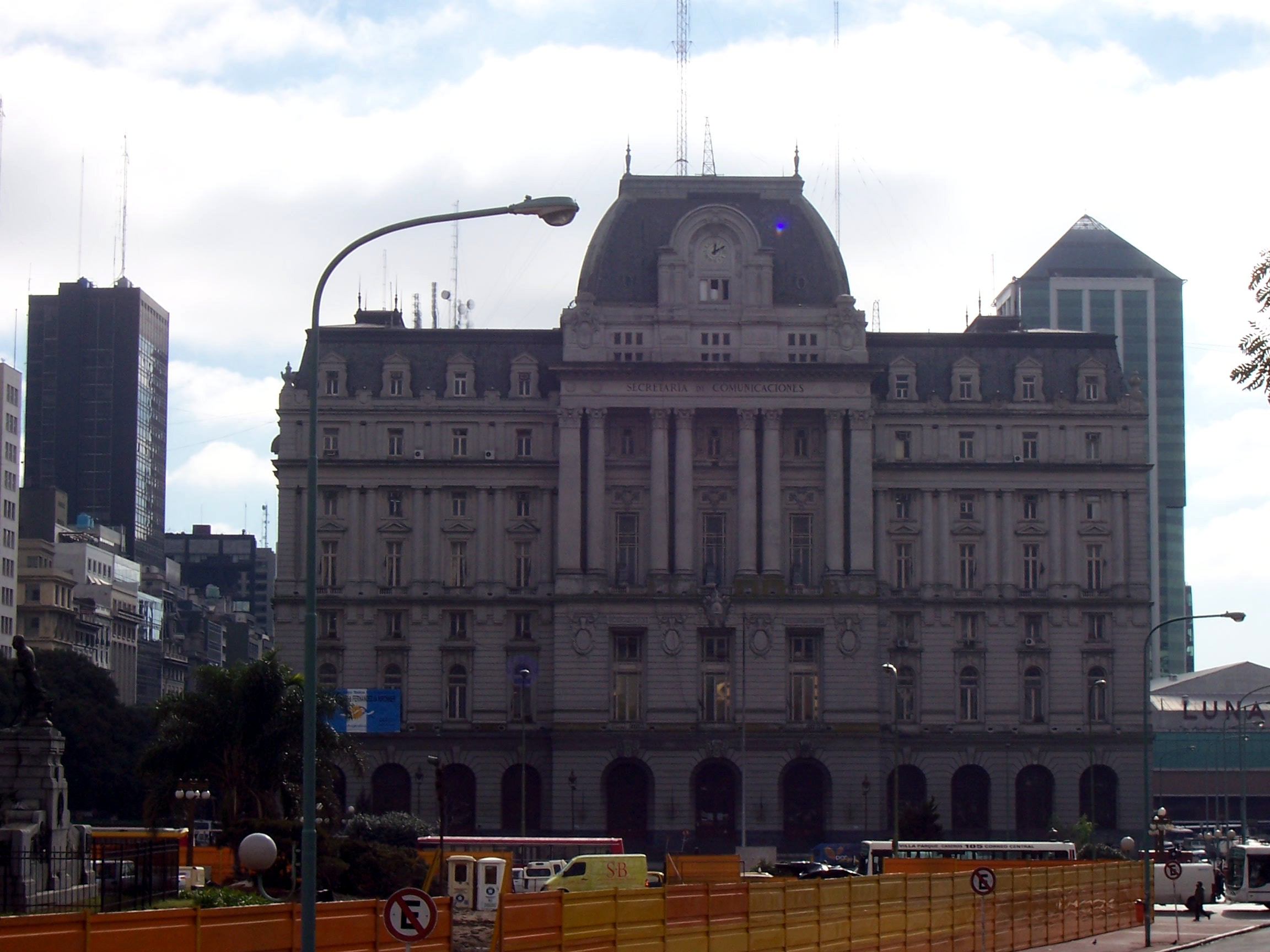
Correo Central station being built in front of the Central Post Office

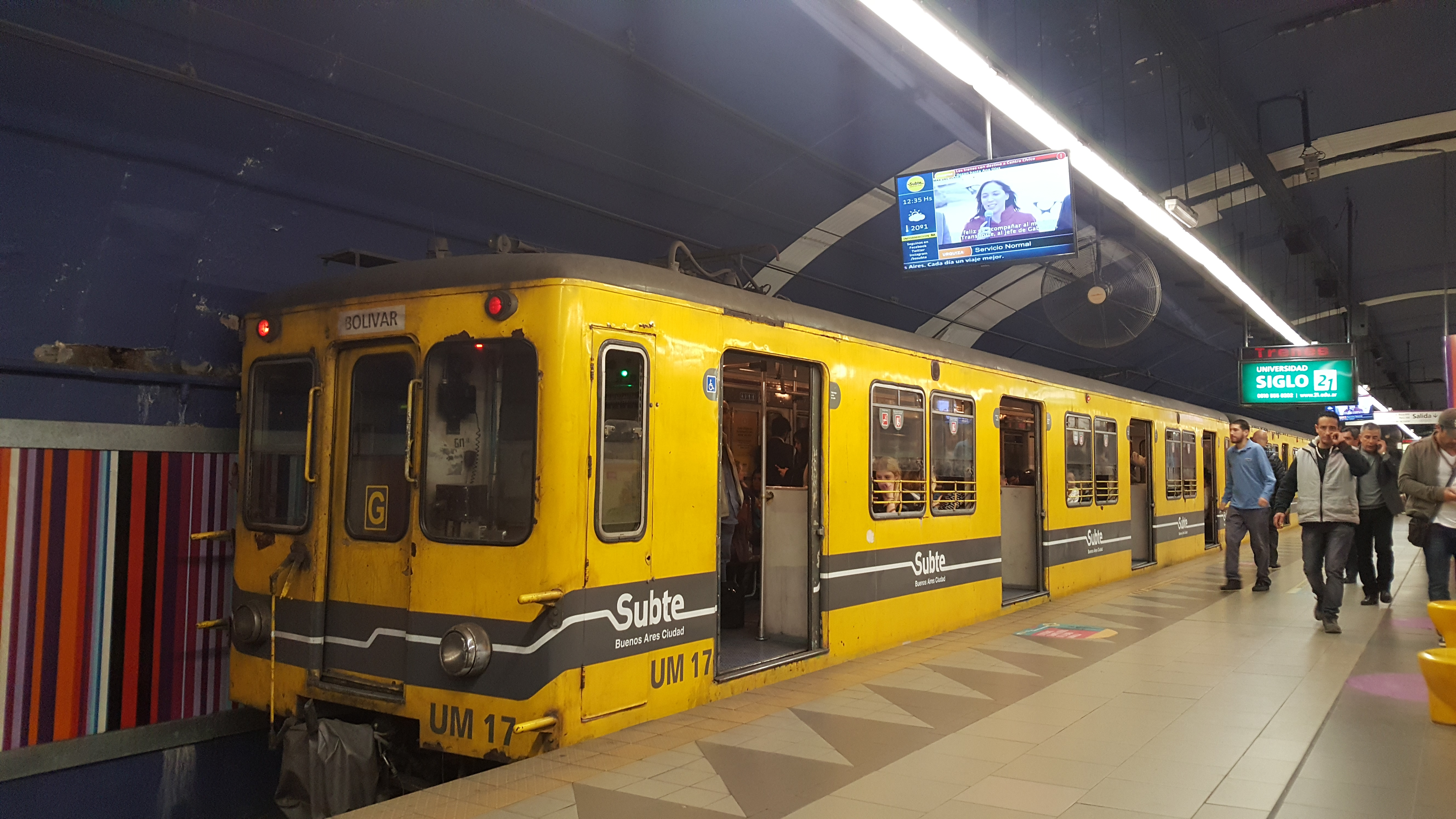
Subway car at Bolivar station

== See also ==
- Buenos Aires PreMetro
- Rail transport in Argentina
