= Buenos Aires Underground =

Rapid transit railway in Buenos Aires, Argentina

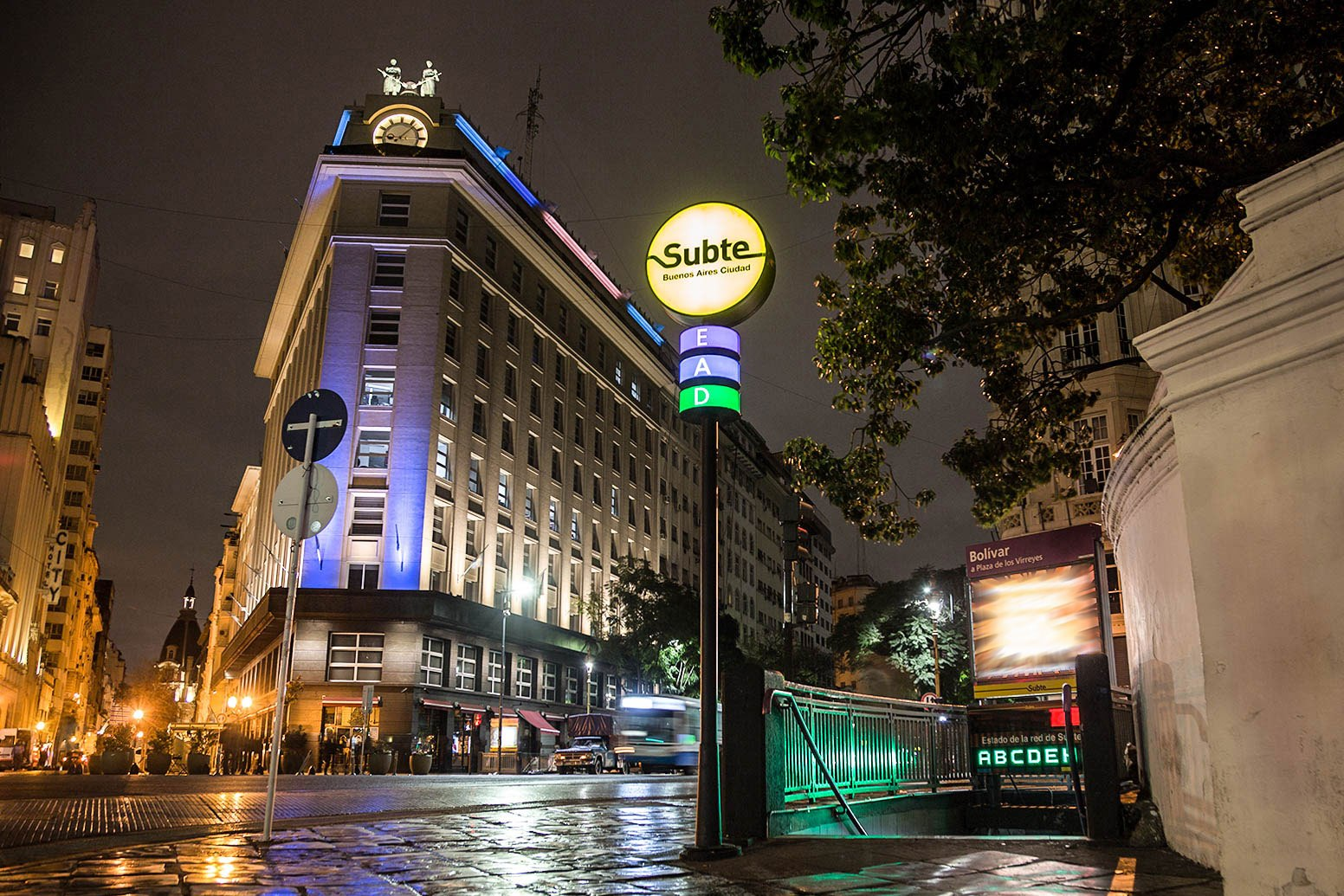
- Bolívar station

Overview
- Native name: Subterráneo de Buenos Aires
- Owner: Subterráneos de Buenos Aires S.E. (government corporation)
- Locale: Buenos Aires
- Transit type: Rapid transit
- Number of lines: 6 heavy rail 1 light rail (Line P)
- Number of stations: 90 (108 including Line P)
- Daily ridership: 545,523 (2024)
- Annual ridership: 199,116,074
- Website: City of Buenos Aires

Operation
- Began operation: 1 December 1913; 112 years ago
- Operator: Emova Movilidad S.A.

Technical
- System length: 56.7 km (35.2 mi); 64.1 km (39.8 mi) including Line P
- Track gauge: 1,435 mm (4 ft 8 1/2 in) standard gauge
- Electrification: : Overhead line, 1,500 V DC; : Overhead line and third rail, 550 V DC; : Overhead line, 750 V DC
System map
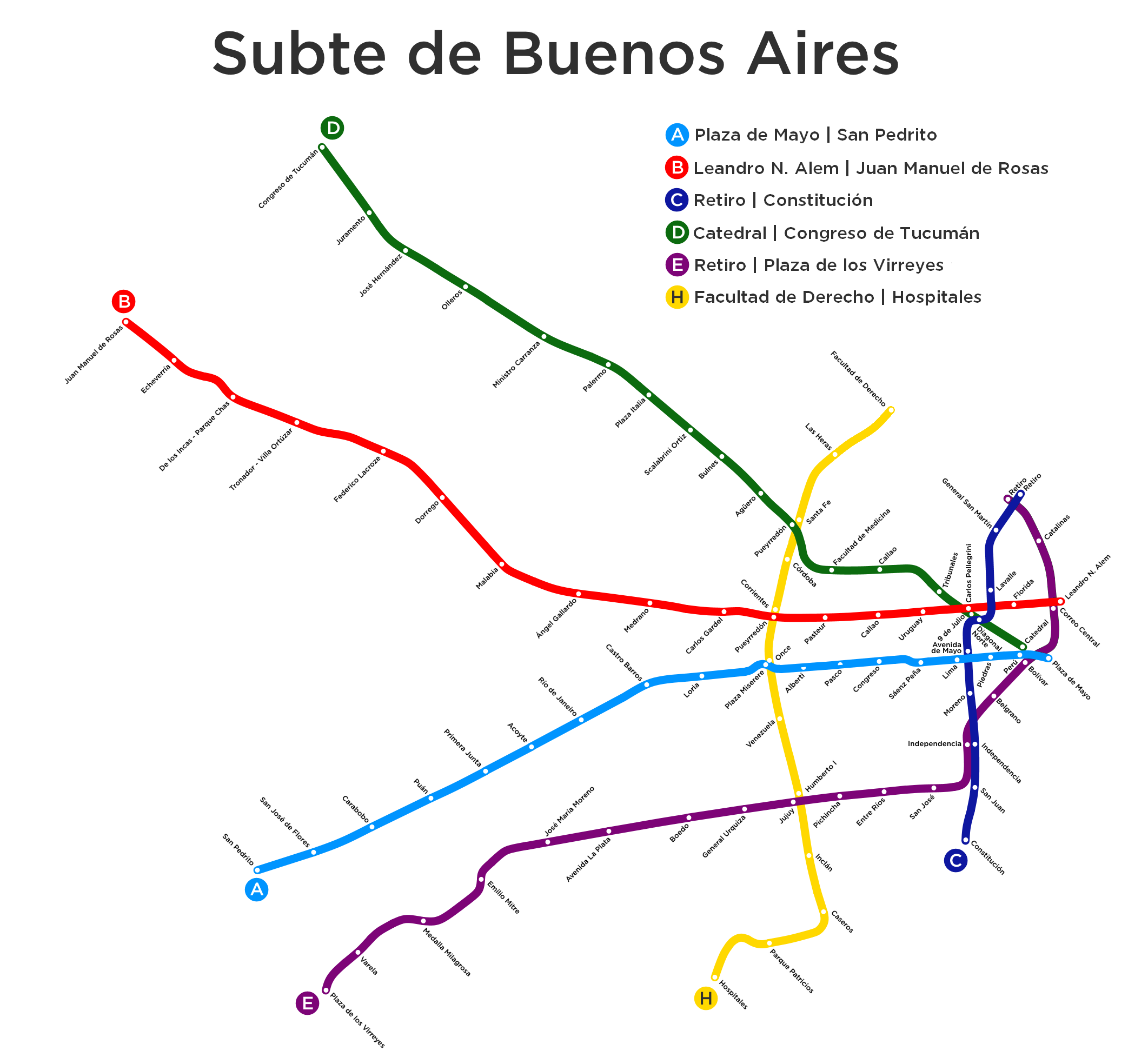

The Subte (Spanish: Subterráneo de Buenos Aires; Spanish: [ˈsuβte]), or Buenos Aires Underground, is a rapid transit system serving the city of Buenos Aires, Argentina. Its first section (Plaza de Mayo–Plaza Miserere) opened in 1913, making it the 13th earliest subway network in the world and the first underground railway in Latin America, the Southern Hemisphere, and the Spanish-speaking world. The Madrid Metro opened nearly six years later, in 1919. As of 2026, Buenos Aires is the only Argentine city in Argentina with a metro system.

Currently, the underground network's six lines—A, B, C, D, E, and H—comprise 56.7 kilometers (35.2 mi) of routes that serve 90 stations. The network is complemented by the 7.4-kilometre-long (4.6 mi) Line P, an 18 station light rail line. Traffic on subterranean lines moves on the left because Argentina drove on the left at the time the system opened. Over a million passengers use the network, which also provides connections with the city's extensive commuter rail and bus rapid transport networks.

The network expanded rapidly during the early decades of the 20th century; by 1944, its main routes were completed, with the addition of its newest line occurring as late as 2007. The pace of expansion fell sharply after the Second World War. In the late 1990s, expansion resumed at a quicker pace, and four new lines were planned for the network. Despite this, the network's expansion has been largely exceeded by the transportation needs of the city and is said to be overcrowded. In 2015, two modernization plans were presented: City of Buenos Aires Law 670, proposing the creation of 3 new lines (F, G, and I), and the PETERS plan, wherein 2 lines were to be created and the I line would have been postponed for future expansion, plus several other route amendments. However, since 2019, there have been no expansions under construction, for the first time in half a century.

The entire network was nationalized in 1939, remaining in state hands and operation until the mid-1990s, when it entered into a concession model. The previously state-operated lines were offered as 20-year concessions to interested private parties; the two complementary lines were also included in this privatization, and all were operated by Metrovías from 1995 to 2021, though the network and rolling stock remain the property of the City of Buenos Aires.

In December 2021, "Emova Movilidad S.A." took over the concession of the Buenos Aires Underground for 12 years. Emova is also part of the Roggio Group, associated with former operator Metrovías.

== History ==
The Subte opened in 1913, becoming the 13th underground system in the world, as well as the first in Latin America, the Southern Hemisphere and the Hispanophone world, followed by the Madrid Metro in 1919. The creation of the underground was part of a number of other urban transformations. A system of public water and sewage was first completed in 1886 and expanded in the subsequent decades, and many streets were paved as part of this same urban renewal.

The underground network was originally built and operated by three separate private companies and later nationalized in 1939. In 1952 it was absorbed by a unified state administration, in 1963 it became the property of a newly founded company, which changed hands in 1979. The Subte then entered into a concession model in the mid-1990s through which private sector parties were to submit bids to execute investment plans "designed and funded" by the state, while implemented by the concessionaire. All the Underground lines, along with the Urquiza Line and Premetro were offered as 20-year concessions to interested private parties. By 1995, Metrovías took over the Subte under a $395 million plan.

=== Early days ===
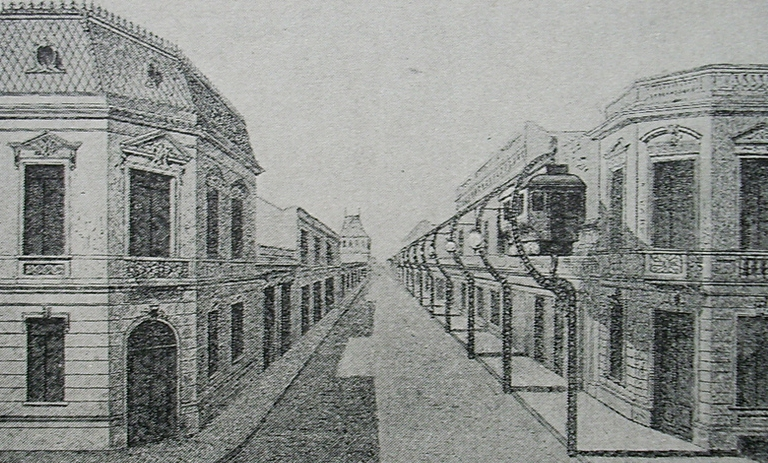
The Le Tellier aerial tramway was an early proposed alternative to the existing tramway system (1889)

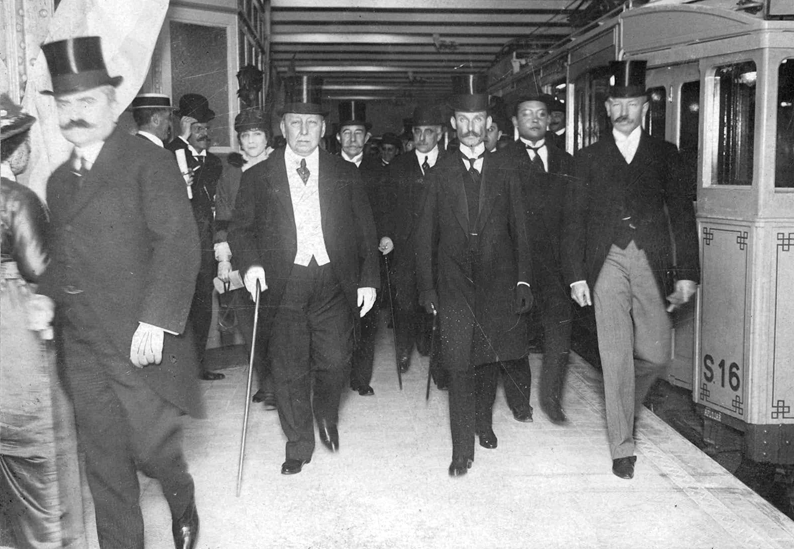
Vice president Victorino de la Plaza opening Line A (1913)

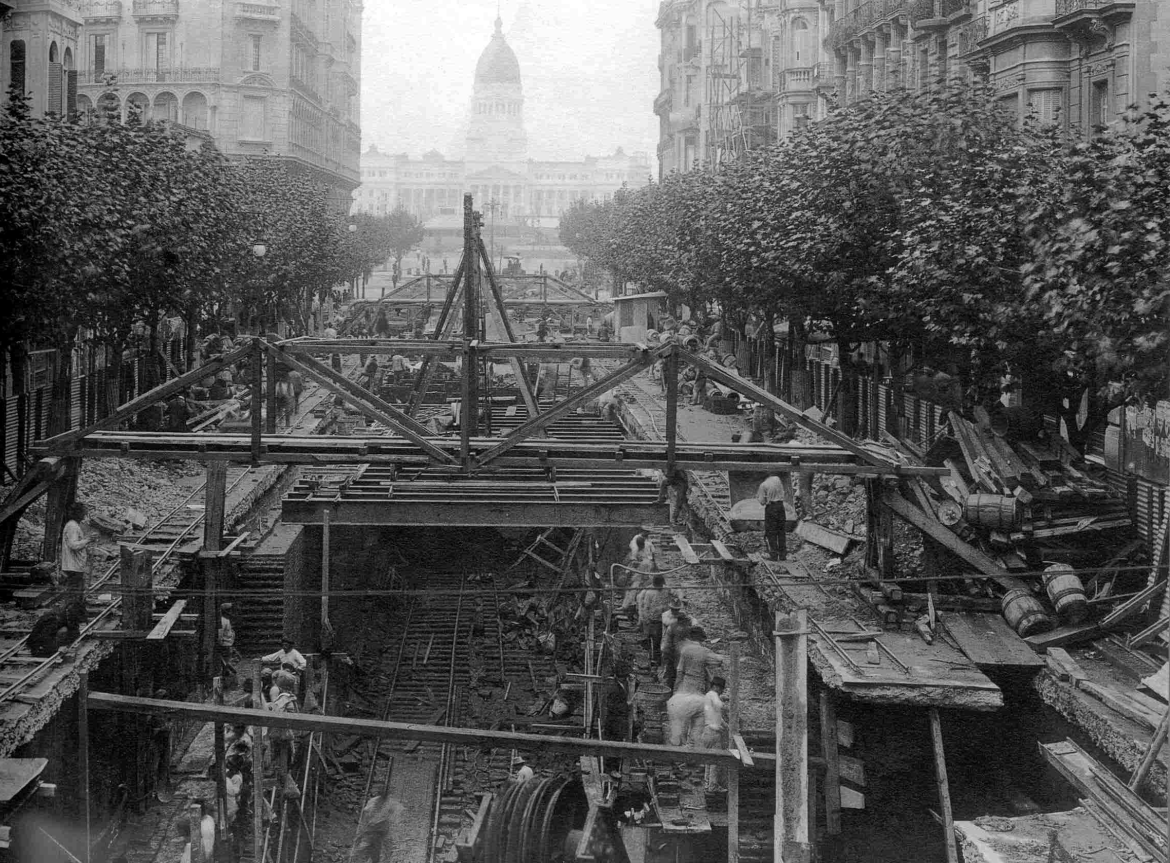
Construction of Line A under the Avenida de Mayo (1912)

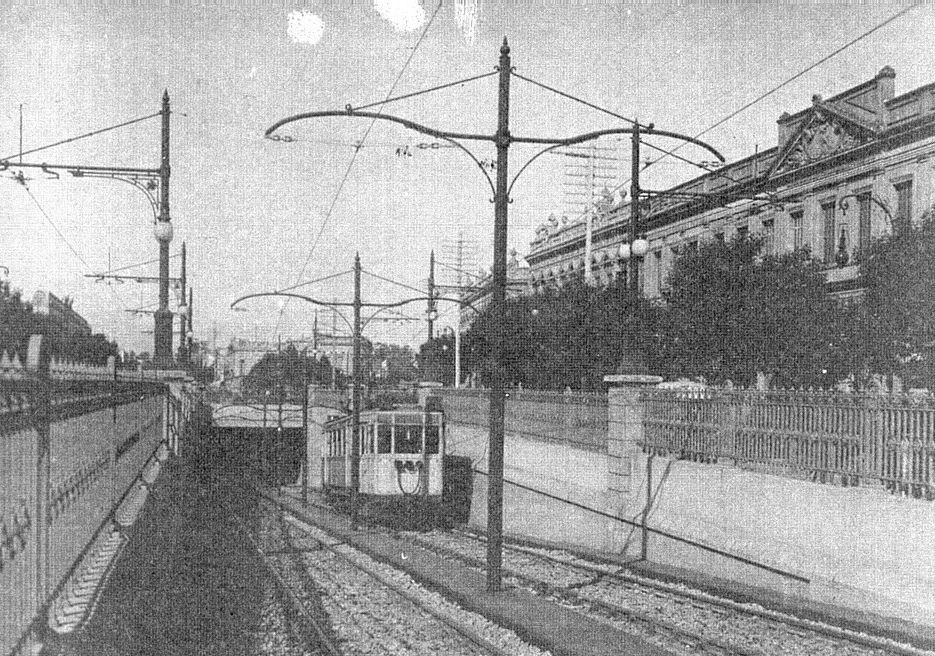
In its early days, Line A continued on above ground (1913).

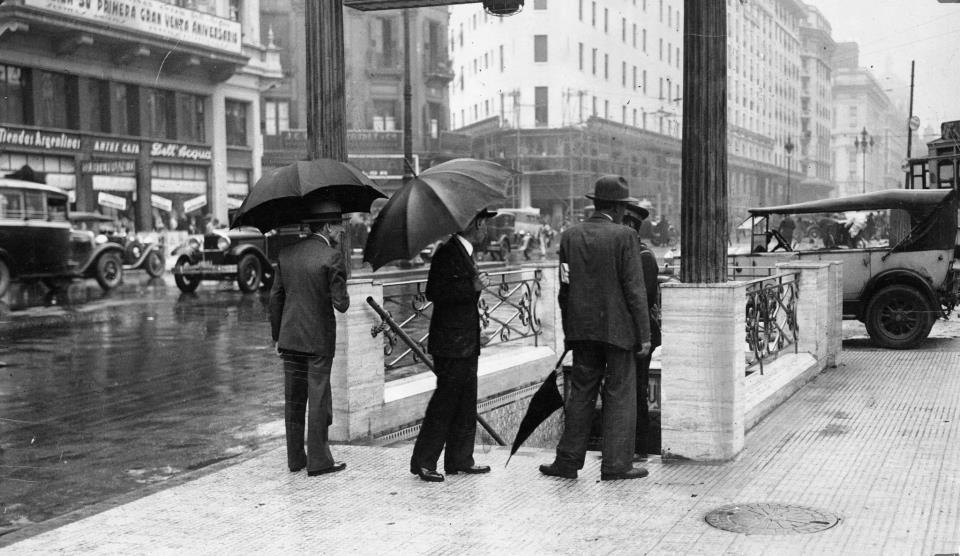
Entrance to Diagonal Norte station on Line C (1936)

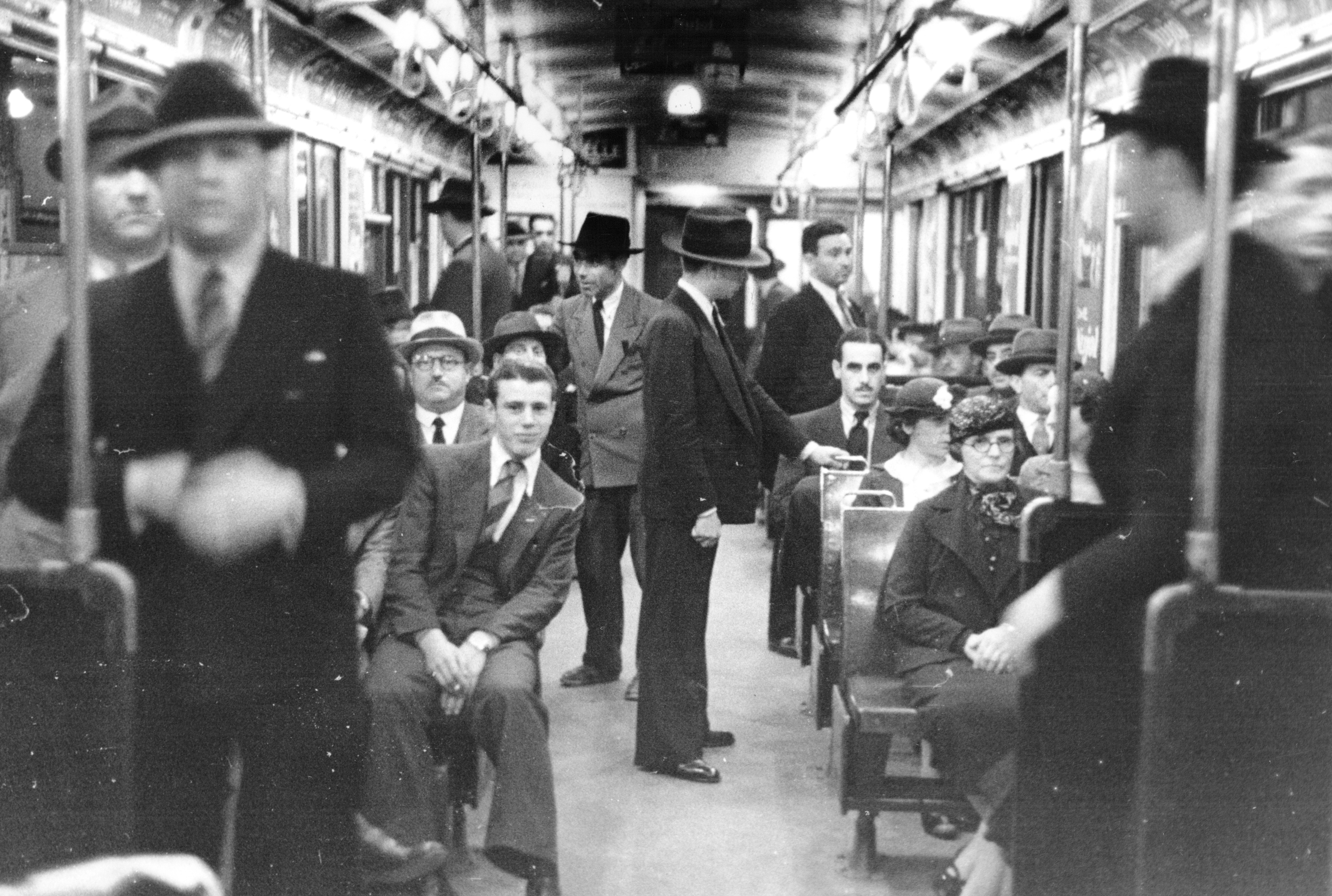
Inside a Line B Metropolitan Cammell car, circa 1938

Evolution of the network from 1913 to 2015.

Discussions on the need to build an underground transportation system in Buenos Aires began in the late nineteenth century, alongside the tramway system, which was one of the most extensive in the world at the time. The first trams appeared in 1870, and by about 1900 the system was in a crisis exacerbated by the monopolization of the lines, which had concentrated under the ownership of fewer companies during the electrification of the system.

In this context, the first proposals for the building of an underground system were made, along with requests for government grants: first, in 1886, and several more in 1889. However, the Ministry of Interior (Ministerio del Interior, in Spanish) denied the city administration the power to license building in the city's subsoil and for this reason, subsequent drafts were submitted directly to this ministry. In 1894, when it was decided to construct the Congress building in its present location, the underground idea was revived, since it would shorten the travel time between the Casa Rosada and the Congress. In 1896 Miguel Cané, former mayor of Buenos Aires (1892–1893), expressed the need to build an underground railway similar to the one in London

There were numerous proposals at the time to build an electric aerial tramway, with one such line to go down the Avenida de Mayo. One proposal was the 1889 Le Tellier proposal, which envisioned multiple lines running along the city's wider avenues with the trams moved using cables and would hang from steel rails fixed to 6-metre-high (20 ft) steel and iron posts positioned in 10-to-15-metre (33 to 49 ft) intervals. The lines would take 24 months to build, and construction would commence 3 months after their approval by the Argentine National Congress, a decision which was ultimately not taken, favoring instead an underground tramway.

The first Underground line was opened on 1 December 1913 and was built by the Anglo-Argentine Tramways Company (AATC), which had been given permission to build in 1909. That line was made up of one of the existing sections of Line A, linking the stations of Plaza de Mayo and Plaza Miserere. 170,000 passengers took part in the line's first trip. On 1 April 1914 the line was to expand to Río de Janeiro station and on 1 July was extended to Primera Junta Station.

In 1912, the Lacroze Hermanos company won a concession to build another Underground line. The company was a competitor to the Anglo-Argentine company, operating tramways in Buenos Aires as well as the Buenos Aires Central Railway, which later became part of the Urquiza Line. Construction began in 1927, and this line became Line B when it was inaugurated on 17 October 1930. During 17–18 December, 380,000 passengers travelled on the line's then 32 cars. The line was originally intended to continue above ground, with the current Federico Lacroze station to be the central terminal of the Buenos Aires Central Railway (today the General Urquiza Railway), however nowadays the overground service forms part of the Urquiza Line instead.

By the 1920s, the Argentine government was dissatisfied with the lack of progress the AATC (which enjoyed a near-monopoly on the city's tramways by this point) had made in expanding the rest of the network and thus revoked its right to build any more lines in 1930, seeking instead another company to do so. By this point, the AATC had only built 48 meters of what is today Line C, a line which would link two of the city's most important rail terminals (Constitución and Retiro) together. In 1933 a third company, the Hispano-Argentina Company of Public Works and Finances (Compañía Hispano–Argentina de Obras Públicas y Finanzas (CHADOPyF), in Spanish) began construction of the other Underground lines. Line C's first section, Constitución railway station-Diagonal Norte, was inaugurated on 9 November 1934 by Agustín P. Justo, then President of Argentina.

CHADOPyF opened Line D in 1937, from Catedral through Tribunales; with Line E following later in 1944, from Constitución to San Juan y Urquiza, later joining with Boedo station. By this point the advent of the Second World War had slowed expansion significantly, but the network was 29 km (18 mi) in length with each of the three companies – unusually for an underground network – continuing to run their respective lines, which were financed entirely with private capital, unlike the country's railways which had been largely dependent on subsidies.

=== Nationalisation ===
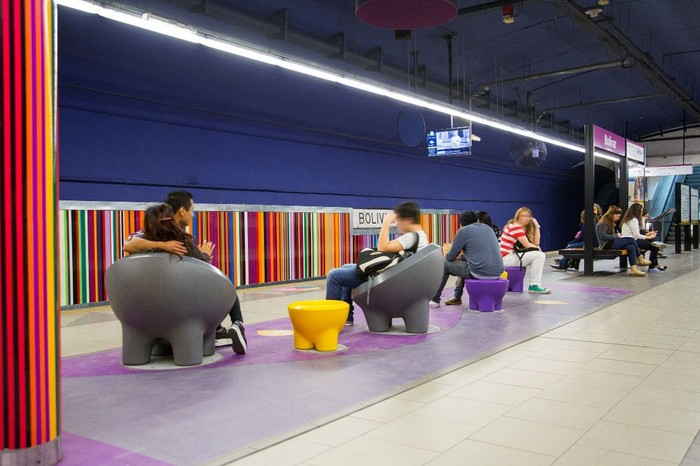
Bolívar station on Line E was opened in 1966.

Former logo of SBA (1963–1980s)

Current logo of SBASE (1980s-present)

The entire network was centralized and nationalized in 1939 under the management of the Transport Corporation of Buenos Aires (CTCBA) and the lines were given their current lettered naming scheme, from A to D in the order in which the lines were opened. In 1952, the CTCBA was absorbed by the Buenos Aires Transport General Administration (AGTBA), and in 1963, the administration was dissolved and the underground network became the property of the Subterráneos de Buenos Aires company (SBA).

In the early years of nationalization, interchanges were provided between the lines previously belonging to the three different companies that built them (AATC, CHADOPyF and Lacroze) since previously only the CHADOPyF lines (C, D and E) had formal connections between them. However, the rate of expansion of the network during this period had slowed considerably and only one station was opened during the 1970s.

Four different long-term expansion proposals were put forward between 1964 and 1991 which all proposed adding numerous lines to the network as well as extending the existing ones. Given the political instability characteristic of Argentina during this time, none of these proposals came to fruition, though aspects of them have been incorporated into contemporary expansion plans. One additional proposal put forward in 1973 saw the unification of the city's commuter rail lines through tunnels and incorporated into the Buenos Aires Underground, and while this was also shelved, it was included in the Red de Expresos Regionales proposal.

During the 1960s and 70s, efforts were primarily concentrated on Line E, which was re-routed from its terminus at Constitución to the centre of the city at the Plaza de Mayo in an attempt to boost passenger figures, something which proved to be successful. The segment was opened by president Arturo Illia in 1966 and Spain offered CAF-General Eléctrica Española trains in order to cancel part of the debt it had accrued with Argentina; trains which continue to serve on the line today. The line was extended westward to José María Moreno in a project that began in 1969 and opened in 1973.

In 1979, SBA became Subterráneos de Buenos Aires Sociedad del Estado (SBASE) under Buenos Aires mayor Osvaldo Cacciatore of the National Reorganisation Process military junta. After a long period of stagnation, the Underground began to be expanded again with Lines B and E within the scope of these plans, though only the extension of Line E was commenced and completed before the transition to democracy where expansion was once again stalled. During this time, four Premetro feeder lines were planned leading out from the western termini of Lines D and E as well as one in Puerto Madero, however only Line E2 was completed in 1987 and these plans were scrapped in 1994 when operation of the Underground changed hands.

=== Privatisation ===
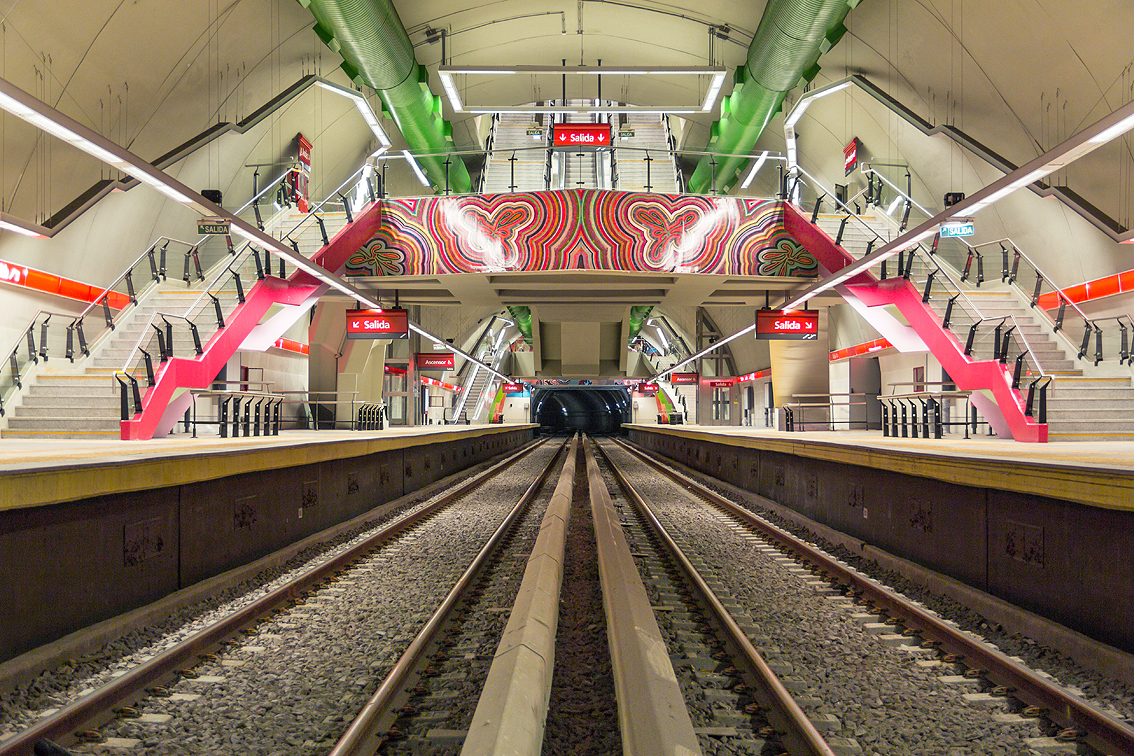
Echeverría station is one of the most recent additions to the network.

In 1994 the operation of the network was privatized, along with the country's railways, and is now managed by Metrovías. SBASE (as part of the Government of the City of Buenos Aires) maintained ownership of the network, its rolling stock, and infrastructure, and administers its expansion and budget. One cosmetic change carried out in the 1990s under private operation was the re-assignation of the colors of the lines, with Lines B and D switching colors, Line C changing from purple to blue and Line E changing from yellow to purple. The change of colors was also accompanied by a standardization of the network's signage to match the new schemes.

In 2012, the role of Metrovías was lessened to simply operating the lines, while maintenance of infrastructure became the responsibility of SBASE. The relationship between Mauricio Macri's mayoral administration and Metrovías became increasingly strained, with the Government of Buenos Aires issuing multiple fines to the operator. The relationship was further strained in 2013 when Metrovías' 20-year concession ended and has since been renewed on a year-by-year basis, leaving the door open for a state-run or mixed operation. Among the public, privatization has proved unpopular, with a survey carried out in 2015 indicating that 82% of passengers would like the Underground to be operated by the state instead of a private company.

In more recent years, Line A and Line B have been extended westwards, adding a total of 4 stations to each line between 2003 and 2013. During the same period, Line H was opened 2007, making it the first completely new line on the underground since Line E, excluding the Premetro. There have also been significant modernizations of infrastructure, signaling systems, stations and the network's rolling stock.

The current contract expired on 31 December 2019 with bids put forward by:

- Keolis in partnership with Transport for London and Eduardo Eurnekian's Corporación América
- Metrovías in partnership with Deutsche Bahn
- RATP Group

Timeline of openings/closures
Date	Line	Opening(s)	Closure
1913-12-01	Line A (Buenos Aires Underground)	Plaza de Mayo – Plaza Miserere	
1914-04-01	Line A (Buenos Aires Underground)	Plaza Miserere – Río de Janeiro	
1914-07-01	Line A (Buenos Aires Underground)	Río de Janeiro – Primera Junta	
1930-10-17	Line B (Buenos Aires Underground)	Federico Lacroze – Callao	
1931-07-22	Line B (Buenos Aires Underground)	Callao – Carlos Pellegrini	
1931–12	Line B (Buenos Aires Underground)	Carlos Pellegrini – Leandro N. Alem	
1934-11-09	Line C (Buenos Aires Underground)	Constitución – Diagonal Norte	
1936-02-06	Line C (Buenos Aires Underground)	Diagonal Norte – Retiro	
1937-06-03	Line D (Buenos Aires Underground)	Catedral – Tribunales	
1937-08-17	Line C (Buenos Aires Underground)	Gral. San Martin	
1940-02-23	Line D (Buenos Aires Underground)	Tribunales – Palermo	
1944-06-20	Line E (Buenos Aires Underground)	Constitución – General Urquiza	
1944-12-16	Line E (Buenos Aires Underground)	General Urquiza – Boedo (old)	
1953-08-06	Line A (Buenos Aires Underground)		Pasco Sur; Alberti Norte
1960-12-09	Line E (Buenos Aires Underground)	General Urquiza – Boedo (current)	General Urquiza – Boedo (old)
1966-04-24	Line E (Buenos Aires Underground)	Boedo (current) – Av. La Plata; San José – Bolívar	San José vieja Constitución
1973-06-23	Line E (Buenos Aires Underground)	Av. La Plata – José María Moreno	
1985-10-07	Line E (Buenos Aires Underground)	José María Moreno – Emilio Mitre	
1985-10-31	Line E (Buenos Aires Underground)	Emilio Mitre – Medalla Milagrosa	
1985-11-27	Line E (Buenos Aires Underground)	Medalla Milagrosa – Varela	
1986-05-08	Line E (Buenos Aires Underground)	Varela – Plaza de los Virreyes	
1987-04-29	PreMetro E2 (Buenos Aires)	Intendente Saguier – Centro Cívico; Intendente Saguier – General Savio	
1987-12-29	Line D (Buenos Aires Underground)	Palermo – Ministro Carranza	
1997-05-31	Line D (Buenos Aires Underground)	Ministro Carranza – José Hernández	
1999-06-21	Line D (Buenos Aires Underground)	José Hernández – Juramento	
2000-03-13	PreMetro E2 (Buenos Aires)	Fátima	
2000-04-27	Line D (Buenos Aires Underground)	Juramento – Congreso de Tucumán	
2003-08-09	Line B (Buenos Aires Underground)	Federico Lacroze – Los Incas/Parque Chas	
2006-11-07	PreMetro E2 (Buenos Aires)	Pola	
2007-10-18	Line H (Buenos Aires Underground)	Once – Caseros	
2008-12-23	Line A (Buenos Aires Underground)	Primera Junta – Carabobo	
2010-12-06	Line H (Buenos Aires Underground)	Once – Corrientes	
2011-10-04	Line H (Buenos Aires Underground)	Caseros – Parque Patricios	
2013-05-27	Line H (Buenos Aires Underground)	Parque Patricios – Hospitales	
2013-07-26	Line B (Buenos Aires Underground)	Los Incas/Parque Chas – Juan Manuel de Rosas	
2013-09-27	Line A (Buenos Aires Underground)	Carabobo – San Pedrito	
2015-12-18	Line H (Buenos Aires Underground)	Corrientes – Las Heras	
2016-07-12	Line H (Buenos Aires Underground)	Santa Fe	
2018-05-17	Line H (Buenos Aires Underground)	Las Heras – Facultad de Derecho	
2019-06-03	Line E (Buenos Aires Underground)	Bolivar – Retiro	

== Network and services ==
The network comprises six underground lines, labelled "A" to "E" and "H" and which are further identified by different colours, covering a total route length of 56.7 kilometers (35.2 mi) and serving 90 stations. There is also one surface 7.4-kilometer (4.6 mi) Premetro "P" line with an additional 17 stations. Daily ridership was approximately 1.11 million in 2015. With the current usage patterns, the entire system is overstretched, and during weekdays overcrowded and with insufficient services. An expansion programme is underway, and it is expected to enlarge the network to 97 kilometers (60 mi) in the future. Similarly, new rolling stock has been incorporated across lines between 2013 and 2016, followed by further orders of new rolling stock, which was expected to increase ridership figures to 1.8 million by 2019.

=== Fares and operating times ===
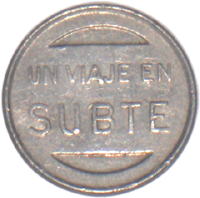

The network historically used token coins, but now uses the SUBE card.

Prior to 2024, standard fares cost AR$125 per trip on the Subte, regardless of travelled distance. After 20 trips, the fare is discounted 20%; after 30 trips, 30%, and after 40 trips the fare is discounted 40%. The Premetro has a flat rate of AR$43.75. Fares have been increased multiple times due to devaluation of the Argentine Peso. While tokens have been used in the past, at present riders use contactless cards called SUBE, which are rechargeable with multiple forms of payment. Previously, single or multi-use paper cards with a magnetic strip (called Subtepass) were used, however, these were phased out of the system in May 2016, opting instead only to use the digital cards, with the exception of some retired, disabled and student cards. In 2024, fares were raised to AR$574, an increase of 360%, as part of austerity policies introduced by President Javier Milei.

Trains run from 05:00 until 23:00, every 3–4 minutes, for all lines except Line H which has a frequency of around 6 minutes. Under modernisation plans commenced in 2013, service frequencies increased to an average of one train every 2 minutes 20 seconds by 2019.

Trains originally ran until 01:00 am, but following the privatisation of the service through concession to Metrovías, the company established an earlier closing time of 23:00 in 1994 to carry out works on the lines. This change was only meant to be temporary, but was never reverted even after the works were completed. There have been numerous petitions as well as a campaign by the City Ombudsman to extend services to 1:30 am on weekdays and 3:00 am on Fridays and Saturdays. These proposals have been rejected by Subterráneos de Buenos Aires, which stated in 2015 that the reduced schedule is needed in order to carry out infrastructure modernisation works across all the lines while they are closed.

The Subte operations are radio-controlled and monitored remotely from the Metrovías Central Operations Post (PCO in Spanish). There 24 operators have been monitoring four of the six subway lines (lines C and H have separate monitoring) since 2001. As of 2015, last formations arrive at their respective terminals at approximately 11:30 pm, where maintenance and cleaning operations take place until about 4:00 am.

Buenos Aires Underground Lines
Line	Year of opening	Last expansion	Original path	Current termini	Length (km)	Number of stations	Daily passengers (2024)
Line A (Buenos Aires Underground)	1913	2013	Plaza de Mayo – Plaza Miserere	Plaza de Mayo – San Pedrito	9.8	18 (17 per orientation)	109,964
Line B (Buenos Aires Underground)	1930	2013	Federico Lacroze – Callao	L. N. Alem – J.M. de Rosas	11.9	17	137,167
Line C (Buenos Aires Underground)	1934	1936	Constitución – Diagonal Norte	Constitución – Retiro	4.5	9	86,657
Line D (Buenos Aires Underground)	1937	2000	Catedral – Tribunales	Catedral – Congreso de Tucumán	10.4	16	96,279
Line E (Buenos Aires Underground)	1944	2019	Constitución – Gral. Urquiza	Retiro – Plaza de los Virreyes	12	18	53,237
Line H (Buenos Aires Underground)	2007	2018	Once – Caseros	Facultad de Derecho – Hospitales	8.8	12	60,547

=== Premetro ===
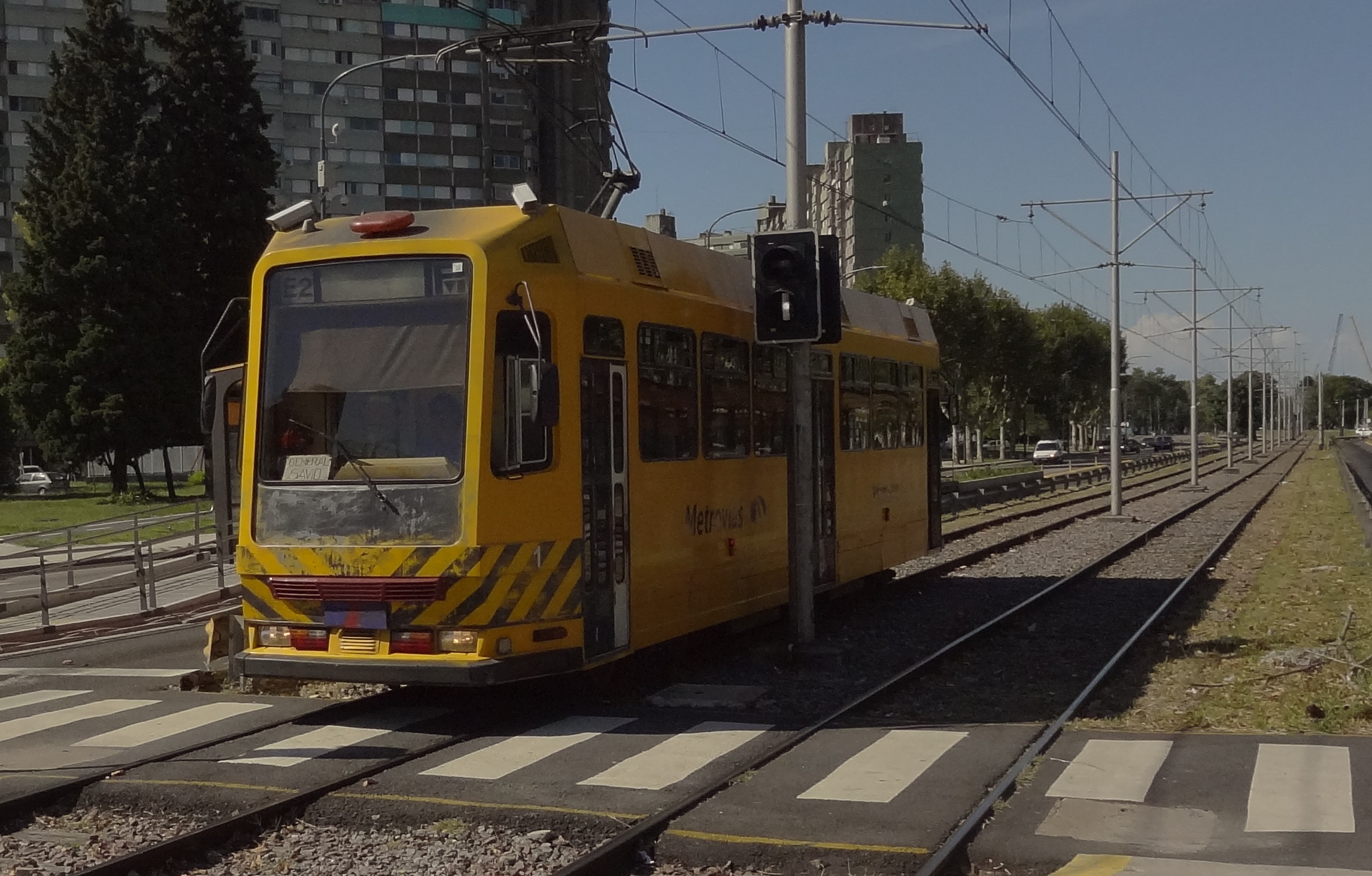
Tram by Argentine company Materfer

The PreMetro line E2 is a 7.4-kilometer (4.6 mi) tramway feeding Line E. The Premetro line opened in 1987. It carries approximately 2,300 passengers daily and is also run by Metrovías. In 2015, SBASE began making plans to refurbish and rebuild many of the stations, including a brand-new central terminal, as part of a plan to modernise the network, with the intent of increasing the amount of rolling stock in circulation. By the end of 2015, the Intendente Saguier terminal had been refurbished, though other works on the line were delayed.

The Premetro was originally intended to include a number of feeder lines to the Underground network, including a second one to Line E and ones on lines C and D. The Premetro project was largely abandoned since it occurred in Argentina's transition to democracy from the military junta and then the privatisation of the railways, which was a difficult time economically for the country, and only Line E2 was built. New Premetro feeder lines have been proposed in recent years, however, the role of the network has given way to the new Metrobus network which covers many of the same routes originally intended for the Premetro.

=== Urquiza Line ===
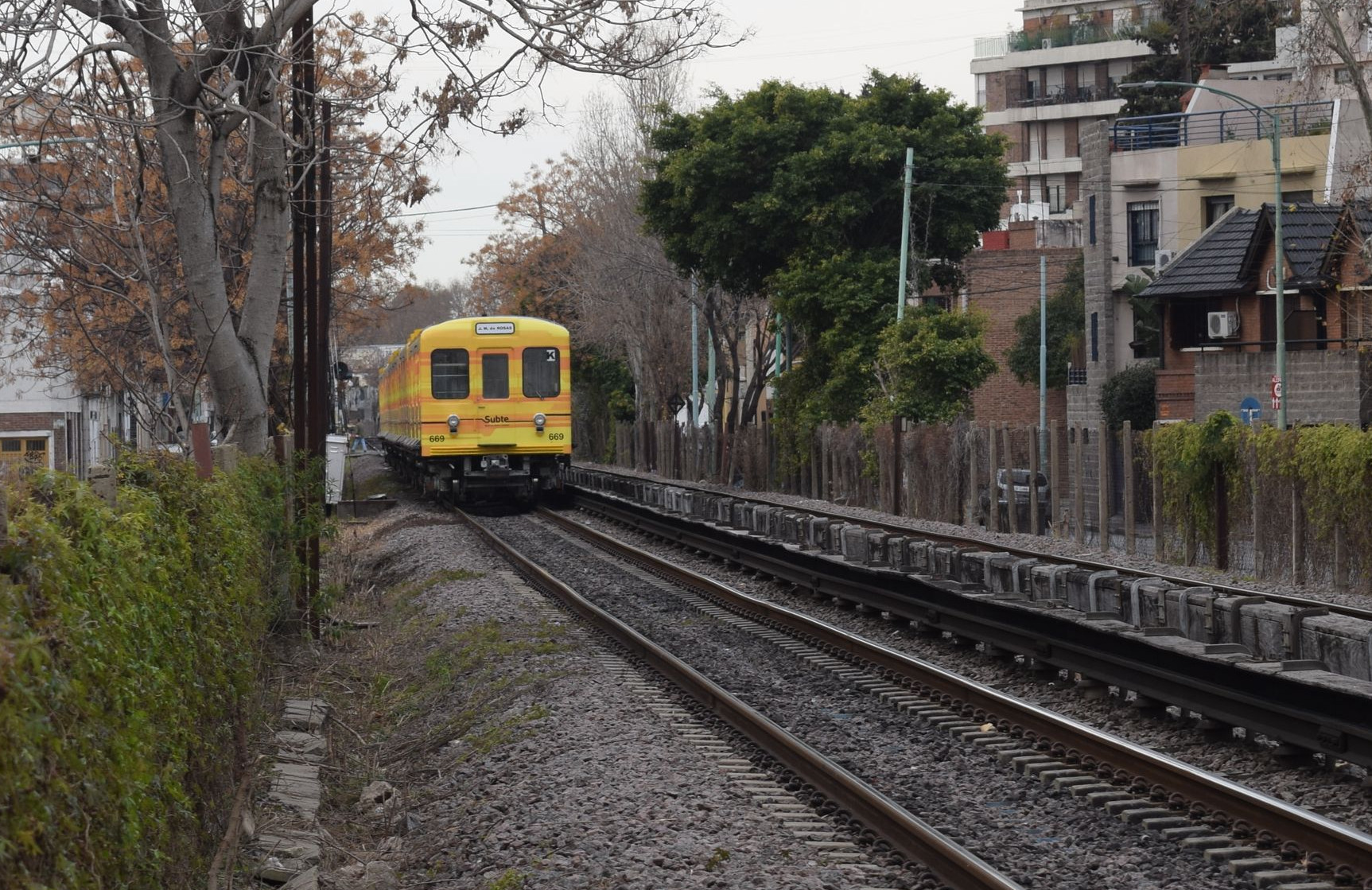
Line B rolling stock running aboveground on the Urquiza Line

Línea Urquiza (in English: Urquiza Line) is a 26-kilometer (16 mi) suburban electric commuter rail line originally designed to be part of the Underground system as part of Line B and operated by the Underground operator Metrovías. As a result, it has similar characteristics to Line B, using third rail electrification and standard gauge as opposed to the broad gauge used in the Buenos Aires commuter rail network. It runs from the Federico Lacroze terminus in the barrio of Chacarita, to General Lemos terminus, Campo de Mayo in Greater Buenos Aires. The line is completely at grade (ground-level) and uses third rail current collection. It operates 20 hours a day, 7 days a week at 8-to-30-minute intervals. The Urquiza Line transported 15 million passengers in 2013.

Originally the line was planned to run into the centre of Buenos Aires through a long tunnel. But when the tunnel was finally built in 1930, it ended up as Line B. The access ramp still exists and is in use today, but for maintenance and storage purposes rather than for passenger services. The Urquiza Line itself opened in 1948, so suburban passengers travelling on the Underground's Line B have to transfer to the Urquiza Line at Federico Lacroze station, named after its builder, about 6 km (3.7 mi) from the city centre.

== Stations and connections ==
Stations are listed from East to West or North to South. Stations in gray have yet to open. Stations in bold are the current termini. Small interchange icons indicate interchanges under construction

=== Ghost stations ===
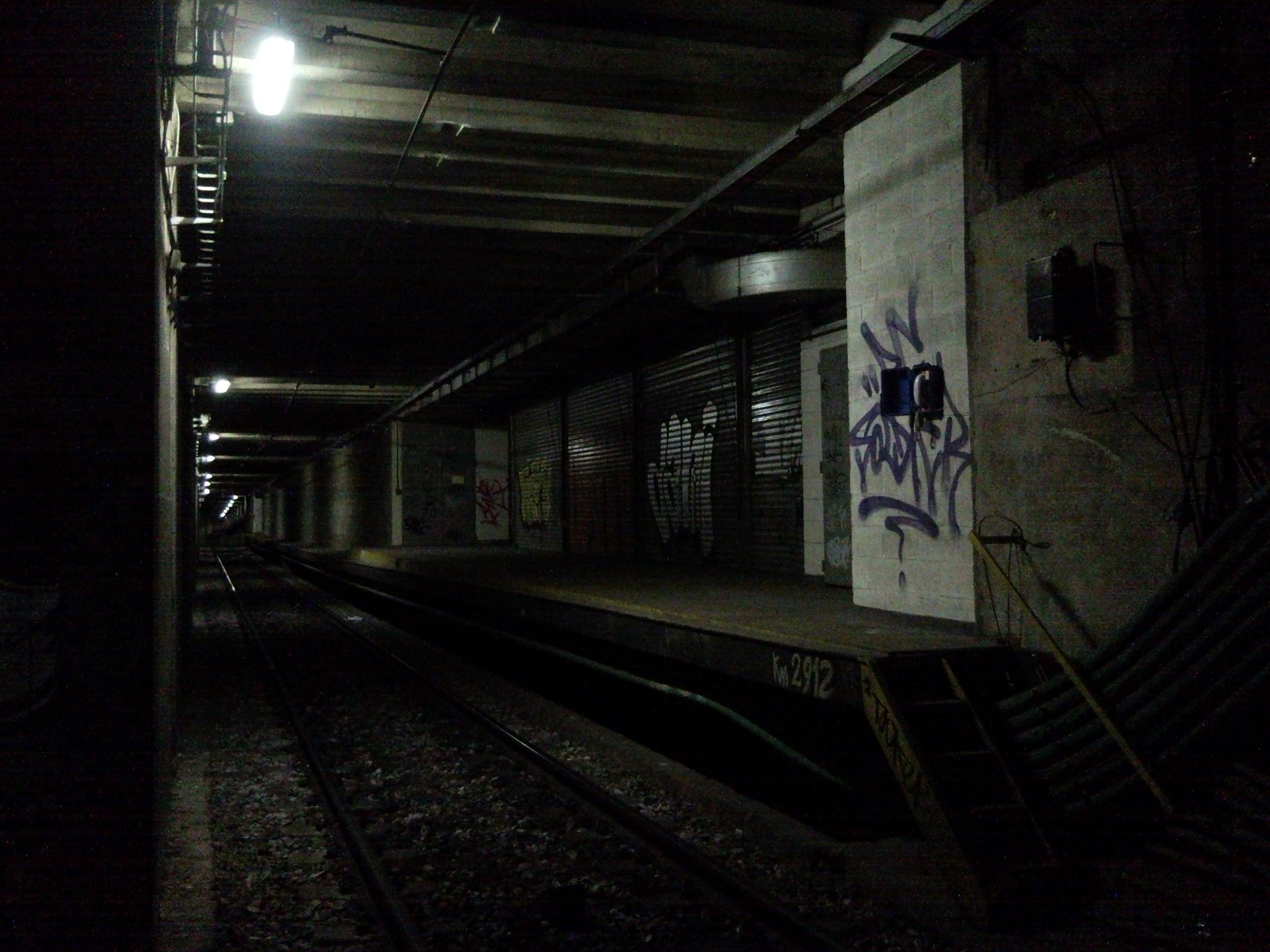
Alberti Norte station on Line A, closed in 1953.

There are four ghost stations on the Buenos Aires Underground, two on Line A and two on Line E. The Line A stations – Pasco Sur and Alberti Norte – were closed in 1953 since stations in that part of the line were grouped very closely together and having fewer stops improved the line's frequency. Pasco Sur remains in very good condition, while Alberti Norte was converted into an electrical substation.

The Line E stations were closed in 1966, after the line was re-routed from Constitución railway station (where it connected with Line C) closer to the centre of the city, leaving the San José vieja and Constitución stations out of the network, a move which tripled traffic on the line. The two stations have subsequently been used as workshops and storage areas.

At one point it was considered that the two former Line E stations and tunnels should be used for Line F since the line's southern terminus would be there and that part of the route would be roughly similar to the old Line E. However, it was eventually decided that the line should use new tunnels in that section due to its sharp curves.

== Expansion plans ==
There have been several plans to expand the Underground system. The Underground's routes are said to spread out like "branches of a tree" from the Plaza de Mayo, something Miguel Delibes described as "restrictive". Current expansion efforts seek to not necessarily go through Plaza de Mayo by creating more north–south lines and moving termini away from the city centre. An expansion plan was approved in the year 2000 under Law 670 and has seen the creation of Line H, as well as the extensions of Line A and Line B westwards. In 2015, an alternative plan has been proposed which would make numerous amendments to the Law 670 plan. As of 2024, no new stations have been added to the network since 2019, and both the 2000 and 2015 expansion plans remain incomplete.

=== Expansions in the 2010s ===
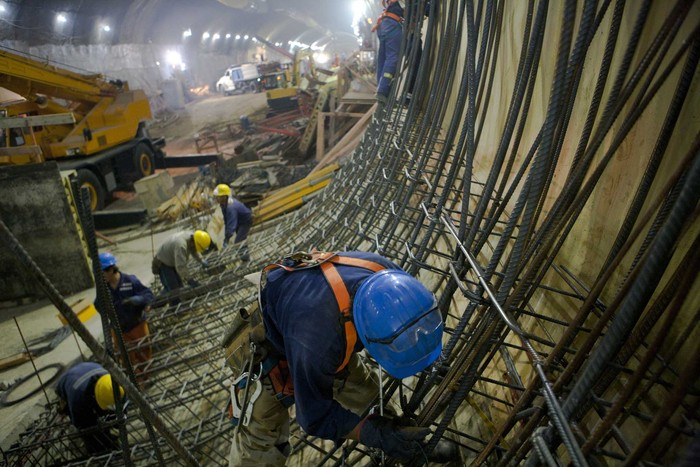
New line H and extensions to other lines are under construction.

Line H's extensions to the north from Corrientes to Plaza Francia, serving intermediate stations at Córdoba, Santa Fe and Las Heras, and south from Hospitales with stations at Nueva Pompeya and Sáenz, were initiated with ground-breaking ceremonies on 17 January 2012. Since then, following concerns that the construction of Plaza Francia station would damage the natural beauty of the area surrounding the Recoleta Cemetery, the station was relocated to Facultad de Derecho next to the University of Buenos Aires's faculty of law, with the change delaying the opening of the station until 2018. Cordoba and Las Heras were opened in December 2015, while Santa Fe opened in mid-2016, providing the line with a connection to Line D. The 20 new Alstom trains to serve the expected increase in passenger numbers as a result of the connection with Line D began arriving in the country in 2015.

=== Planned lines ===
The future network as outlined in Law 670

The future expansion outlined in Law 670 would see the addition of three new lines (F, G, and I).

Line F will run from Barracas to Plaza Italia in Palermo and will include 16 new stations. The planned route length of this line is 10.8 km. Construction was due to begin in 2020, once the northern extension of Line H is complete, and as originally planned, the line would have automatic trains and platform screen doors.

Line G will connect Retiro and Caballito/Villa Crespo; 12.5 km long with 15 new stations. Originally, construction was due to start in 2012–2013, however city legislators opposed the turnkey construction proposed by Chinese firms since the total cost would have been 30% higher than if it was done with local companies.

Line I will run from Parque Chacabuco to Ciudad Universitaria with 18 new stations. The route length is 12.6 km. The future of this line (which had the lowest priority in the expansion plans) is currently uncertain since it has been proposed that a Metrobus line be built instead, which would follow the same trajectory as the line.

=== PETERS plan ===
The PETERS 3 layout was the one recommended in the study.

In October 2015, the city of Buenos Aires together with the Inter-American Development Bank presented a 150-page plan for the Underground called the Strategic and Technical Plan for the Expansion of the Subterranean Network (Plan Estratégico y Técnico para la Expansión de la Red de Subtes, or PETERS), highlighting past expansion efforts and the need to adapt plans to the current needs of the city. In this version of the Underground, Line I is cancelled while Line G takes a different route through the center of the city terminating at Constitucion railway station after going through the neighborhood of San Telmo, rather than through Retiro railway station. Other changes include a Retiro Norte node where lines F and H terminate, rather than at Plaza Italia and Retiro respectively, while Line E is extended to Plaza Italia from Retiro – a segment which in the original plan was part of Line F. In these plans, Line C is extended both northwards in a loop to Retiro bus station and southwards to the Buenos Aires Belgrano Sur Line railway station minor terminal.

Such plans are subject to approval by the Buenos Aires City Legislature and would mean the annulment of many of the existing expansion plans outlined in Law 670. Some criticisms include the failure of the PETERS plan to account for the extension of the Belgrano Sur Line to Constitucion railway station, meaning that Line C's extension to the minor Buenos Aires terminal would be redundant, and that the Retiro Norte node would also be made redundant by the planned Red de Expresos Regionales commuter rail tunnels which are to link the three major railway terminals of the city.

== Modernization of existing lines ==
Much of the modernization in recent years has centered around the Underground's rolling stock, with large scale renewals and refurbishments of existing fleets, in particular on Lines A and H. Along with this came the construction of new underground workshops and storage areas on lines A, H and E, as well as the expansion of the existing facilities on Lines B and D.

In September 2015, the president of SBASE highlighted plans for the 2015–2019 period for the Underground at a conference with other South American mass transit operators in Brazil. One of the largest changes to be made during this period was the upgrading of signaling systems on all lines, with the exception of Line E. Lines A and B were to receive Automatic Train Operation systems, replacing their ATS and ATP systems respectively, whilst lines C, D and H were to receive Communications Based Train Control systems. The implementation of these systems was already under way on Lines C and H as of September 2015, and was due to be completed on other lines before 2019. Line D was also to receive platform screen doors along with the CBTC system.

Other works to be carried out during this period include the improvement of disabled access in older stations, new ventilation systems on lines B, C and D, improvements in electrification (such as replacing overhead lines and substations) on lines A, B, C and D and the replacement of 14 km of track on Lines C and E. The total investment in this period for these new projects was set at US$1.34 billion.

=== Stations ===
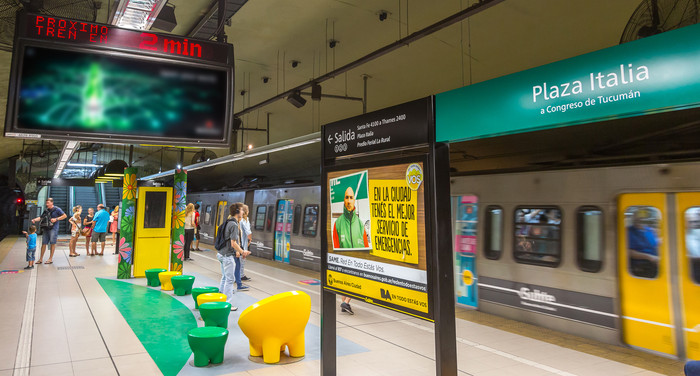
A "digital space" at Plaza Italia station, which also features the new matte signs

Starting in 2007, the network's stations began to receive technological updates ranging from Wi-Fi to interactive terminals. Through BA-WIFI (the citywide free internet service), passengers can use internet free of charge across all stations and aboard trains, though this has been delayed on Line A due to complications surrounding the line's age. There are also several "digital spaces" across the network and in its commercial galleries where seating areas are provided, along with recharging stations for mobile devices.

There has also been widespread cosmetic changes to stations, including the restoration of historical murals, the incorporation of new artwork and improving the lighting. The renovations on Line B have been met with criticism for destroying parts of the line's historic heritage, which dates back to the 1930s. The appearance of the network's signs has also been changed and the new signs have been gradually replacing the old ones since November 2014.

== Rolling stock ==
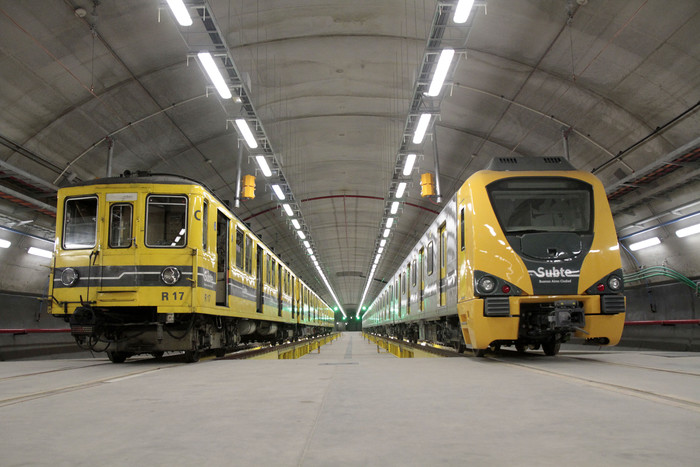
The Siemens-Schuckert Orenstein & Koppel stock was replaced by the 300 Series.

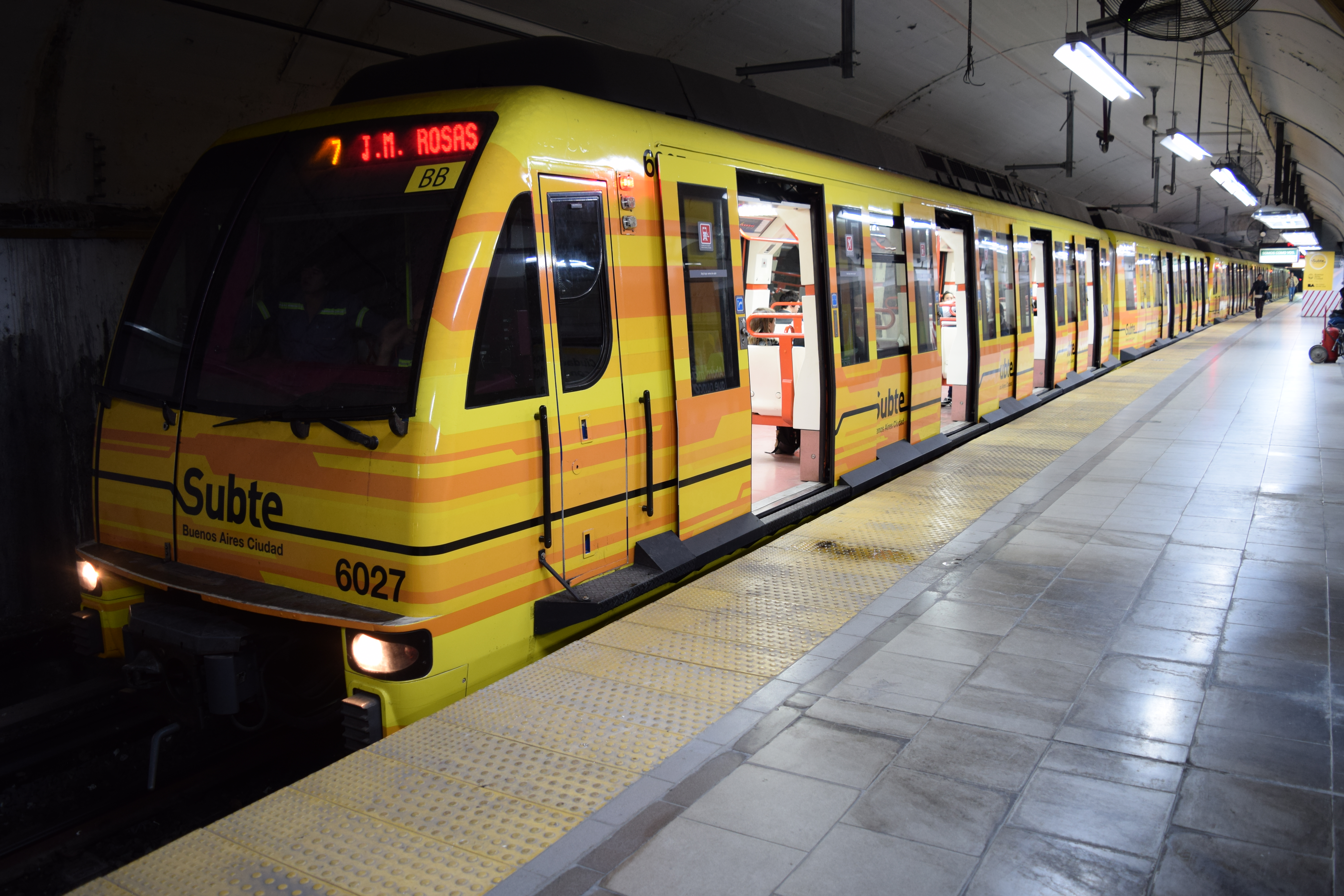
CAF 6000 trains were one of the second hand purchases.

The Buenos Aires Underground has had among the longest serving and most varied rolling stock in the world, in part due to the network having been originally built and operated by three different companies in its early years, causing incompatibilities between the lines. The network began with uniform rolling stock, with the Anglo-Argentine Tramways Company Anglo-Argentine Line A using La Brugeoise cars (with the exception of a few UEC Preston cars), the three CHADOPyF lines (C, D and E) using Siemens-Schuckert Orenstein & Koppel stock and Lacroze's Line B using Metro-Cammell cars. However, as the lines were expanded and passenger numbers increased, more rolling stock was needed, which made the network less uniform, particularly with regard to the problematic Line B, which used a different electrification system and measurements from the other lines. Line B also became the first line of the network to receive second-hand rolling stock in 1995.

=== 2010s fleet upgrades ===
Since then there have been moves towards greater modernization and standardization, with large purchases of new rolling stock from companies such as Alstom and China CNR Corporation, as well as smaller orders of second hand rolling stock, which the government of the City of Buenos Aires claims are temporary measures while those lines are modernized to be able to incorporate more modern rolling stock. Such stock has been acquired from Tokyo, Nagoya, and Madrid. From 2013 to 2019, 468 new cars arrived while 232 received refurbishment, bringing the average age of the fleet to 22 years in 2016, down from 34 in 2014.

The network's oldest cars – the La Brugeoise cars – were retired in 2013, while its historically most widely used cars – the Siemens-Schuckert Orenstein & Koppel cars – were to be retired in 2015, though this was pushed back to June 2016 following delays on the opening of Santa Fe station on Line H. While there has been much movement of rolling stock, often in a "hand-me-down" manner from higher frequency lines to less used lines (the primary recipient being Line E), the transition to newer models has gone fairly smoothly, despite shortfalls in some lines following extensions. The Fiat-Materfer cars have been the primary stand-ins while the new trains arrive, though this role has also been filled by the Siemens-Schuckert Orenstein & Koppel cars, delaying their retirement.

Though Line A ran on a different voltage to the rest of the network, it was converted to the 1500 V used on the rest of the network when the 200 Series trains began to arrive. On the other hand, Line B has traditionally been the most troublesome of the network given its different voltage and the fact that it uses third rail electrification as opposed to the overhead lines used on the rest of the network, making it in effect a separate entity not capable of sharing its stock with other lines. Presently this line uses 1950s rolling stock acquired from Tokyo's Eidan 300/400/500/900 series Marunouchi Line, along with CAF 5000 and CAF 6000 stock acquired from Madrid which are to replace the aging Eidan stock. The line, along with its remaining third rail stock, is being converted to overhead lines at 1500 V, after which the entire network will be standardized.

== Culture and heritage ==
The Buenos Aires Underground has historically been characterized by murals and other artistic works in its stations, making it a kind of museum throughout the system. These works, and a number of complete stations, are considered part of the cultural heritage of the city and several of them were declared National Historic Landmarks in 1997.

=== National patrimony ===
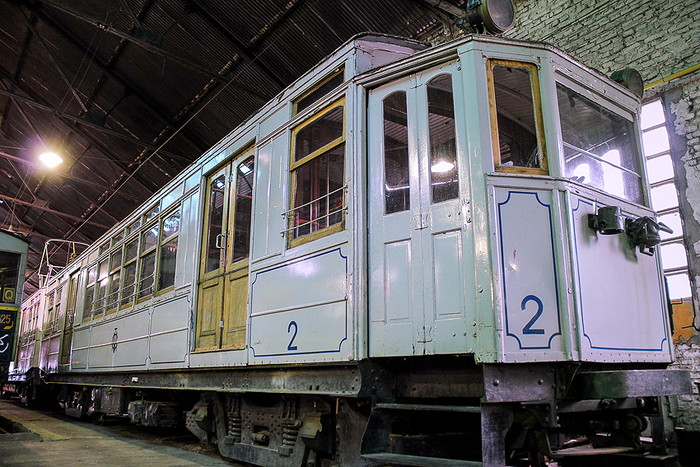
A UEC Preston car inside the Polvorín Workshop. These were used from 1913 to 1977.

Line A is renowned for having kept its original 1913 rolling stock running on the line up until 2013, making them the oldest underground carriages in commercial service in the world at the time. They were built by La Brugeoise, et Nicaise et Delcuve, a Belgian rolling stock manufacturer established in the city of Bruges, between 1913 and 1919. Entirely made of wood, they were originally designed to run as underground as well as tramway cars, but they were adapted in 1927 to their current style for underground service only.

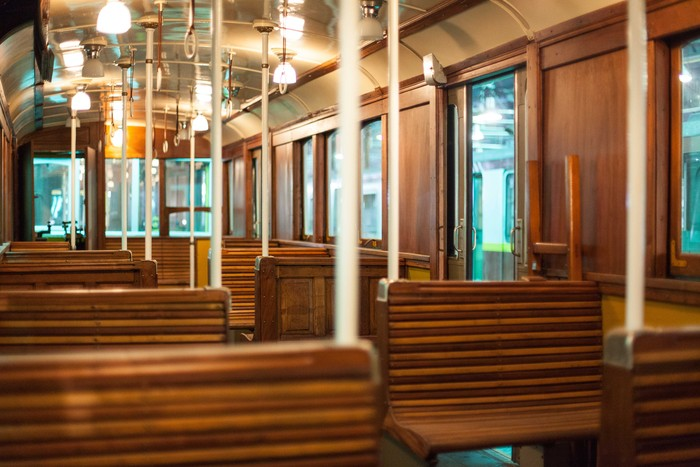
Refurbishment of La Brugeoise cars for public display began in 2013.

In March 2013, La Brugeoise subway carriages were replaced by new Chinese 200 Series rolling stock, just 11 months prior to their 100th anniversary on the line. The original rolling stock has since been maintained, some in exhibition and some being converted to 1500 V to run tourist services on the line. During the festivities of the 100th anniversary of the underground on 1 December 2013, many restored La Brugeoise trains circulated Line A and there was a symphonic orchestra at Plaza de Mayo station as well as free rides for the entire city in order to mark the event. Throughout the week that followed, there were also numerous displays and events across the different lines of the Underground. As of 2017, there were plans to preserve and run some of the cars a few times each year for special events.

Currently, the Polvorín Workshop – originally inaugurated along with Line A – is being transformed into a museum to display artefacts and the former rolling stock of the Underground. The workshop also serves as the headquarters for the Association of Friends of the Tramway and many of the Underground's historical artefacts are stored there, such as the wooden UEC Preston "palace cars", which also make appearances on Line A during special occasions such as anniversaries and even the inauguration of president Raúl Alfonsín in 1983, where he and other officials were transported from the National Congress to the Casa Rosada using these cars.

=== Artwork and exhibits ===
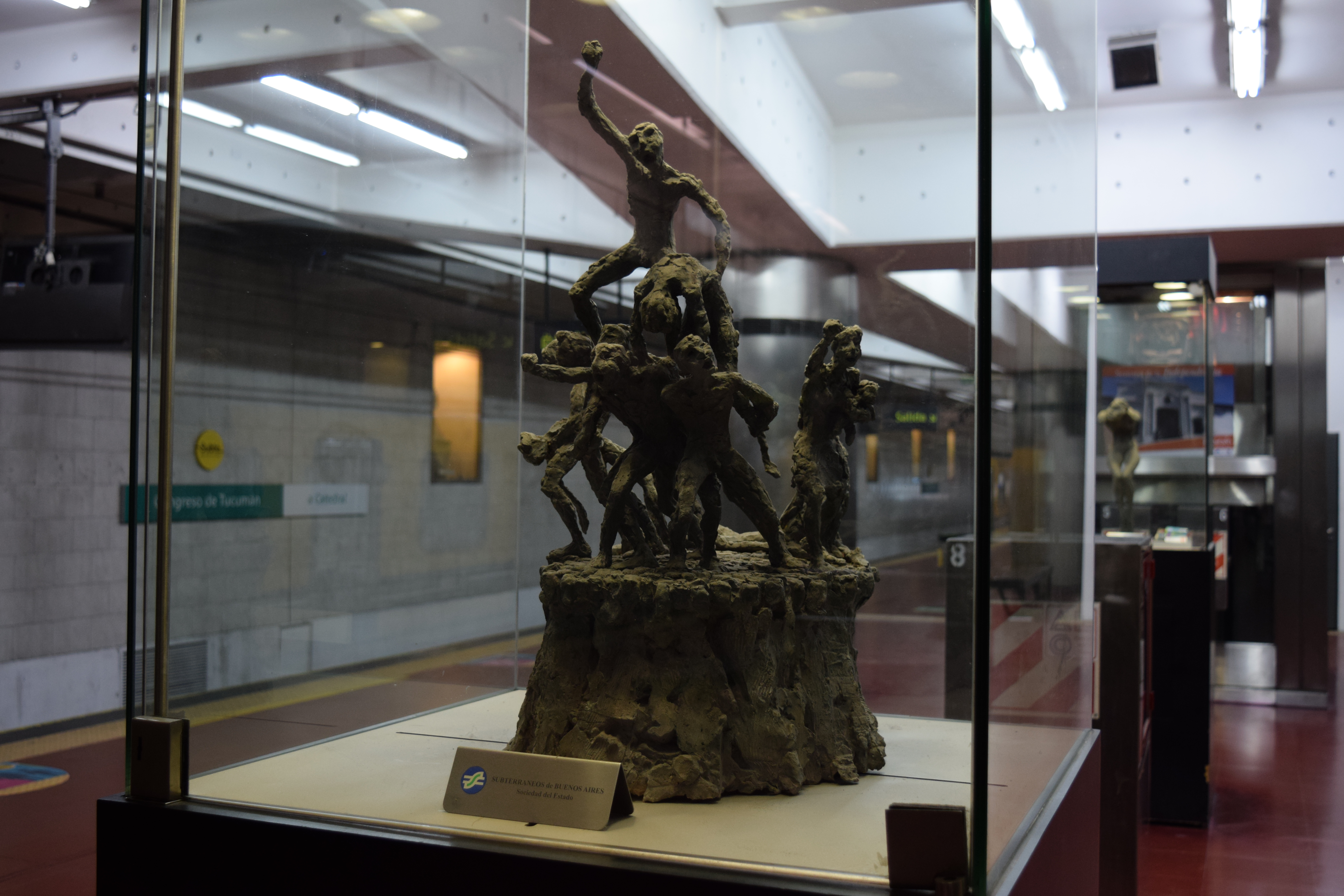
One of the exhibits at Congreso de Tucumán on line D. Note the glass encasings along the walls where the busts are exhibited.

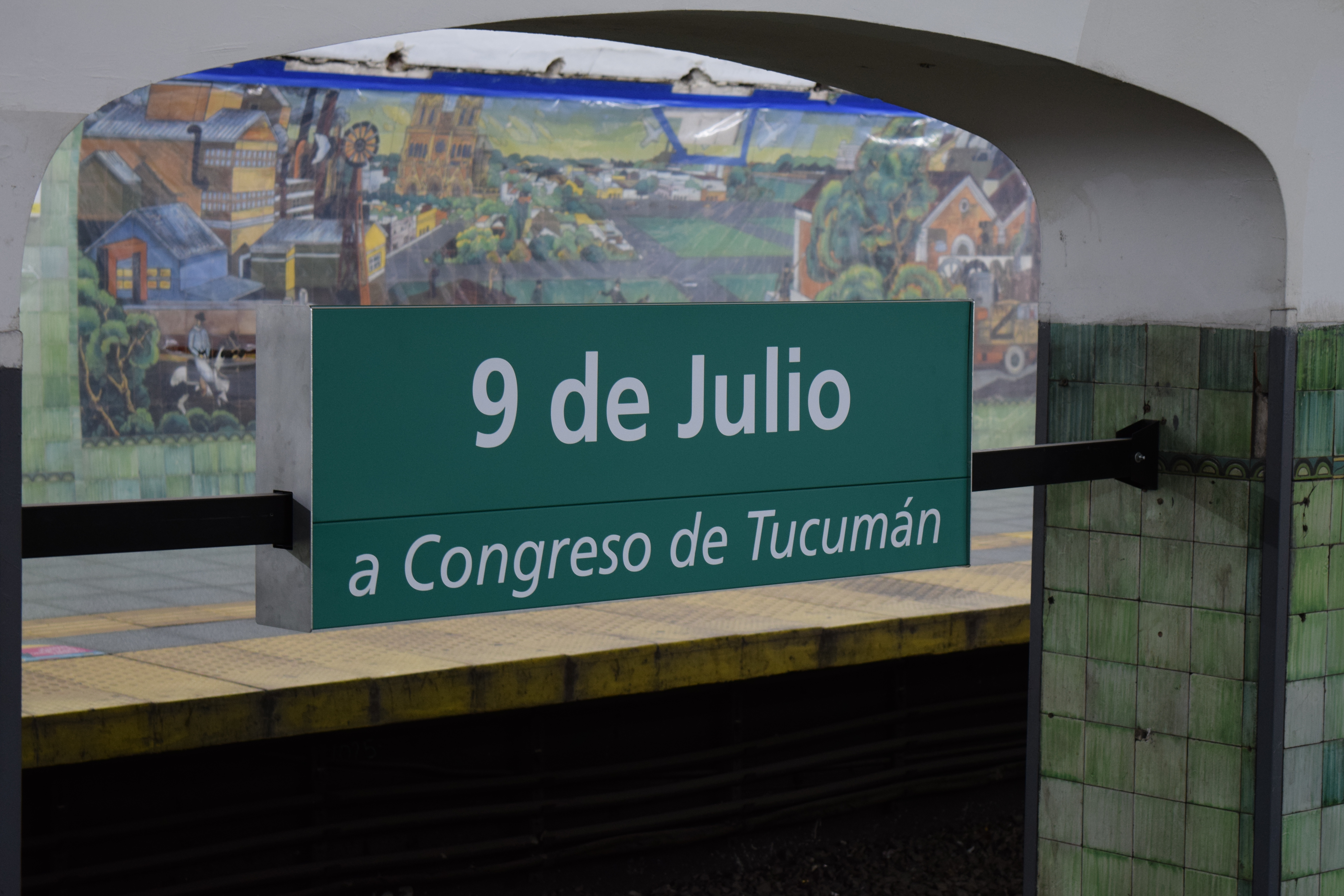
A mural undergoing restoration at 9 de Julio station

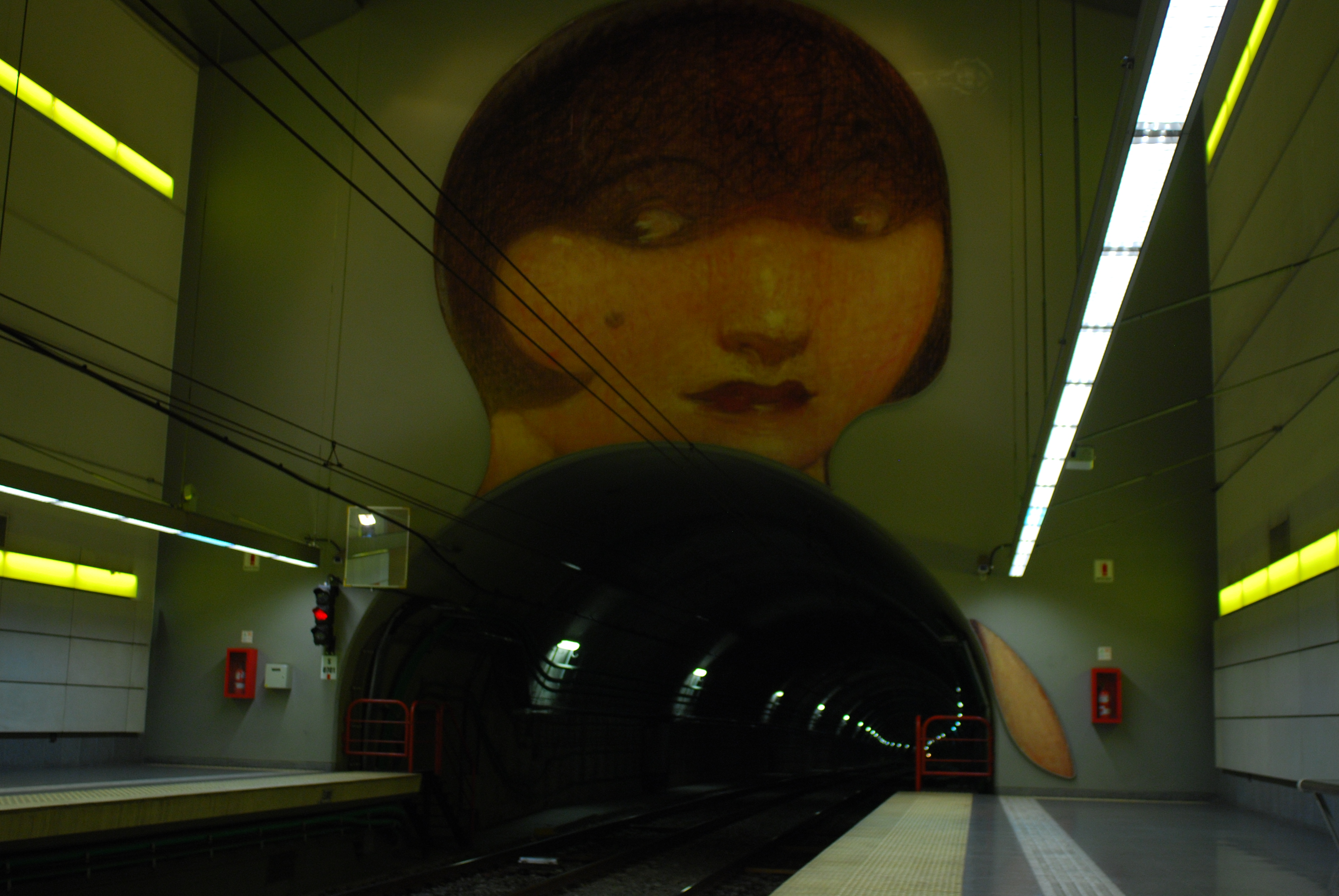
A modern mural at Venezuela station on line H

The network has over 390 artworks by over 170 artists across its stations, ranging from historic murals to modern art. Styles also vary, from mosaic to fileteado, sculpture and installation pieces. Many stations are decorated with intricate ceramic tile work, some of which date back to 1913 when the Underground first opened its doors. Featured artists include painters and reproductions by Quino, Molina Campos, Raúl Soldi, Rodolfo Medina and Jorge Schwarz. In addition, they provide spaces for music and theatre events, including an underground iteration of the Pepsi Music Festival on Line H.

==== Line A ====
The oldest line on the network has maintained its original appearance from 1913 and 1914 on the Plaza de Mayo – Primera Junta segment following restoration works in 1988 for the 75th anniversary of the line and again in 2007. These older stations feature no advertisements, but instead have recreations of original advertisements from the early 20th century. The Line's newest segment, which runs from Puán to San Pedrito, displays more modern artworks, such as those by Uruguayan artist Guillermo Roux at San José de Flores station.

==== Line B ====
In Tronador – Villa Ortúzar station there are 18 stained glasses that refer to the history of the Villa Ortúzar neighborhood, where the station is located. In Los Incas – Parque Chas station there are murals related with different Pre-Columbian era civilizations are exhibited. In 2015, SBASE faced criticism for its incorporation of new artworks in multiple stations on the line. Many of these artworks were painted directly over tiles dating back to the 1930s when the line was opened by the Lacroze company, while others were completely removed and destroyed.

==== Line C ====
From Constitución to Diagonal Norte, the line features murals of Iberian landscapes created by Spanish artists such as Ignacio Zuloaga and Fernando Álvarez de Sotomayor y Zaragoza, which date back to the time of the line's opening by CHADOPyF.

==== Line D ====
The line's murals on its original Catedral – Palermo route date back to 1937 and 1940, and began to be restored in 2013. These include murals by Argentine artists Benito Quinquela Martín in Plaza Italia station. There are also numerous showcase exhibits in its newer stations, with a series of ceramic reproductions by Raúl and Daniel De Francisco in Juramento station, ceramic reproductions of four murals made by Raúl Soldi in José Hernández station and showcases exposing works made in the Ceramic School No.1 in Olleros station Congreso de Tucumán station was the network's first "museum station" and holds numerous exhibits, among them busts of key political and cultural figures in Argentine culture and history such as Jorge Luis Borges and Manuel Belgrano displayed in glass enclosures in its platform walls.

==== Line E ====
Some modern murals on the line include an homage to the 1996 Argentine film Moebius at San José station. The film used the line for its primary filming locations and the murals depict scenes from it. Recently opened Correo Central station has received an award from the Association of Structural Engineers in Argentina for the quality and creativity of the work.

==== Line H ====
The newest line on the Underground has many Hermenegildo Sábat mural reproductions related to tango in all stations. Its numerous stations depict different tango singers and poets relating to the neighbourhoods in which they are situated. Santa Fe station was renamed to Santa Fe - Carlos Jáuregui in 2017, in honour of LGBT rights activist Carlos Jáuregui.

=== Graffiti ===
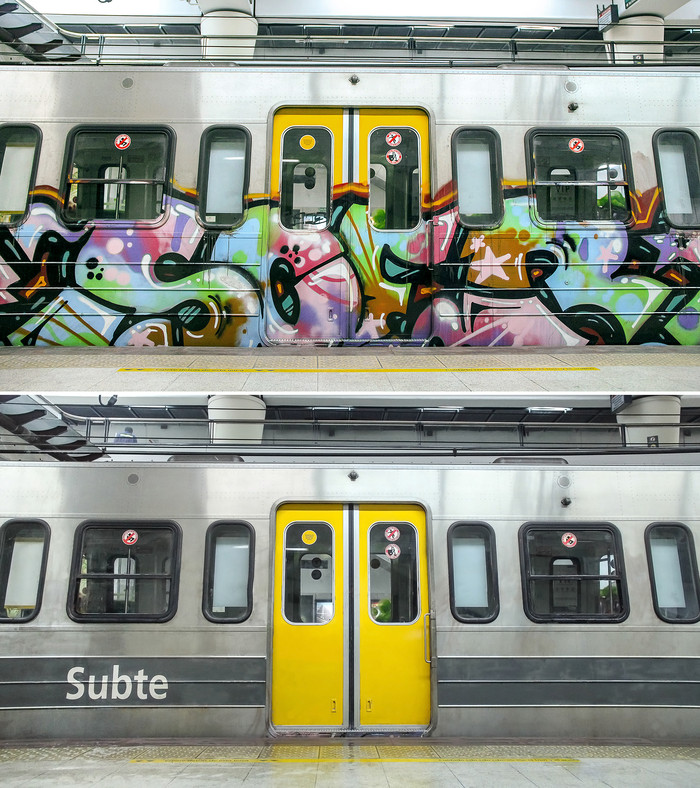
Graffiti before and after removal on a 100 Series car.

Graffiti on the Buenos Aires Underground became particularly prevalent in the late 2000s and early 2010s, and by 2013, four out of every five cars on the network had some degree of graffiti. By January 2015, all the painted cars had been cleaned by night-time cleaning teams using a product specially developed for SBASE that allowed the removal of graffiti without damaging the livery of the cars. Cleaning the 410 vandalized cars had cost the City of Buenos Aires AR$ 10.25 million pesos, while a coat of anti-graffiti paint has been applied to the cars to make future cleaning easier using alcohol.

SBASE, along with the Buenos Aires Metropolitan Police, has adopted a zero tolerance policy on graffiti in the Buenos Aires Underground, imposing fines ranging from AR$400–6000 and up to 30 days community service, the culprits often being made to clean the cars they vandalized. Increased vigilance from over 500 police officers, as well as close to 300 CCTV cameras, have aided in decreasing new acts of vandalism by 85% in 2014, with a further decrease of 50% in 2015 after security was intensified.

Painted cars were often worked on by organised groups in a "whole car" (graffiti jargon for covering the entire visible surface of the vehicle) manner, severely reducing visibility from inside the cars. Numerous arrests have been made on these groups which often consist of foreign nationals from countries such as Chile, Germany and France; two German nationals and a Chilean national were arrested in January 2016. One high-profile arrest of such a group saw four Argentines detained in 2015 after vandalising a 200 Series train on Line A. Their houses were subsequently raided, uncovering a vast collection of stolen Subte paraphernalia as well as documented evidence of their activities in the form of videos and photographs.

According to Clarín, people from across the world have visited Buenos Aires with the sole purpose of "bombing" (painting cars in a clandestine manner), while competition among different groups exists in the form of greater points being earned for painting newer cars or the level of danger experienced. In most cases, the people involved are university educated and with stable employment. In January 2016, a group called Soketes Calcetines was discovered to be offering tourists graffiti tours of the Underground, giving them a chance to paint cars for a fee. The group documented their activities and uploaded them to YouTube in order to promote the business, which has been subsequently shut down with its members arrested.

=== In popular culture ===
The Buenos Aires Underground is featured in the 1996 science-fiction film Moebius, directed by Gustavo Mosquera. In the film, the circumstances surrounding the disappearance of an underground train are investigated by a topologist. The film is based on the short story "A Subway Named Mobius", which takes place in the Boston Subway.

Other films with scenes shot in the Underground include Highlander II: The Quickening, Focus and The Official Story.

In Ricardo Piglia's 1997 novel Plata Quemada, the bank robber protagonists enjoy riding the underground regularly. In Ernesto Sabato's novel On Heroes and Tombs, Fernando, one of its main characters, develops a paranoia with blind people in the underground.

One of Jorge Luis Borges' earlier editorial jobs was for Urbe, a promotional magazine for the underground system, which was privately owned at that time. In the magazine, he wrote several articles on sci-fi topics under various pseudonyms.

Line B and some of its stations feature heavily in the 2013 Argentine point-and-click adventure game Reversion: The Meeting.

El Eternauta is a science fiction comic book created by Héctor Germán Oesterheld and Francisco Solano López in 1957. The story is about an alien invasion in Buenos Aires. Part of the action takes place at the Plaza Italia station, as the heroes try to use the tunnel to escape from the aliens, and successfully exploit the weakness of the alien leader to kill him. The comic book, published in the 1950s, made reference to the "Canning" station, a former name of the Scalabrini Ortiz station.

== See also ==
- List of Buenos Aires Underground stations
- List of Latin American rail transit systems by ridership
- List of metro systems
- Rail transport in Argentina
- Trams in Buenos Aires
- Transport in Argentina
