= Moebius (1996 film) =

- Directed by: Gustavo Mosquera
- Screenplay by: Pedro Cristiani; Gabriel Lifschitz; Arturo Onatavia; Natalia Urruty; María Ángeles Mira; Gustavo Mosquera R.
- Based on: "A Subway Named Mobius" by A.J. Deutsch
- Produced by: Gustavo Mosquera
- Starring: Guillermo Angelelli; Roberto Carnaghi; Anabella Levy; Jorge Petraglia
- Cinematography: Abel Peñalba; Frederico Rivares
- Edited by: Alejandro Brodersohn; Pablo Giorgelli
- Music by: Mariano Núñez West
- Production company: Universidad del Cine
- Distributed by: Fama Films
- Release date: 1996
- Running time: 90 minutes
- Country: Argentina
- Language: Spanish
- Budget: $ 250.000

Moebius is a 1996 Argentine science fiction film directed by Gustavo Mosquera, and starring Guillermo Angelelli, Roberto Carnaghi and Annabella Levy. It is based on the 1950 short story "A Subway Named Mobius" by Armin Joseph Deutsch. The film is set in the Buenos Aires Underground, in a dark and dystopian Buenos Aires.

== Plot ==
On one 4 March, the controllers of the Buenos Aires Underground discover that train number UM-86 (a Siemens-Schuckert Orenstein & Koppel train), along with its passengers, has gone missing in the network of tunnels. After searching the entire network (which in the film is shown as being much larger than in reality) they fail to find both the train and its passengers.

In an attempt to hide the incident from the public, the director of SBASE contacts the engineering firm responsible for the construction of the line where UM-86 went missing in order to investigate the incident. The firm then sends a young topologist Daniel Pratt, rather than an experienced engineer, which displeases the director.

Upon looking for the original plans of the line at a national archive, Pratt discovers that they are missing and were taken away by his former lecturer at the University of Buenos Aires, Hugo Mistein. After looking for him at the university, another professor tells Pratt that Mistein retired some time ago and has not been seen or contacted for a considerable period.

Pratt gets hold of Mistein's address and calls his house from a public telephone. The professor is not at home; however, the phone is answered by an uncooperative young girl who tells him Mistein isn't home and then hangs up. Since Pratt is out of change, he decides to go to the apartment in person.

After arriving at the apartment, Pratt is greeted by the same girl who spoke to him on the phone and after some reluctance, lets him into the apartment. Inside, he discovers the plans he had been looking for but is forced to leave through the fire escape, along with the girl, after a knock on the door.

The pair enter a station and search for the director. The girl is told to wait on one of the platforms while Pratt addresses the director and numerous officials tasked with getting to the bottom of the UM-86 mystery. The group informs him that the entire line has been closed and all trains halted to make the search for the missing train easier. Upon delivering the news, the sound of a train is heard through the tunnels.

The group runs around the multi-level station looking for UM-86 but it is nowhere to be found. Maintenance workers at the bottom level also heard the sound, but presumed it was coming from the top level, where Pratt and the others were located. Upon hearing this, the director orders that all power be turned off in the line, which has little effect other than further angering the committee.

The group return up the station and Pratt reveals his complex theory: that the construction of the perimeteral line has turned the network into a form of Möbius strip which, under the right conditions, caused the missing train to pass into another dimension. The theory is ridiculed by the rest of the committee and Pratt is relieved of his post as investigator. He then leaves the station along with the girl.

After seeing a roller coaster at the Parque de la Ciudad, Pratt is inspired to make a series of mathematical calculations, perfecting his theory. He quickly returns to the underground line and begins taking notes throughout the day on the movements and schedules of the different trains, coming to the realisation that UM-86 is soon to appear.

He then begins walking through the tunnels and ascends one level through a maintenance passage and continues walking. After some time, a train appears and almost hits him. The shaken-up Pratt continues through the maintenance areas and finds himself at another station, named after the Argentine writer Borges (an intentional decision by the director of the film). He boards the first train that arrives there.

Pratt makes his way up the train, and to his surprise notices the UM-86 naming on the carriages. The 30 passengers onboard are in a serene state, unresponsive and staring forwards. Upon reaching the conductor's cabin, Pratt discovers professor Mistein sitting in the conductor's chair, waiting for him.

After some philosophical discussion which confirms the validity of Pratt's theory, the two critique modern society. The following day, the director of SBASE is summoned to a station. There he finds UM-86, empty of passengers and with only Pratt's journal explaining his theory, which was left in the conductor's cabin. As the director is about to leave, he receives a phone call about another train that is missing.

== Locations ==
The following Buenos Aires Underground stations were used as sets for the film:

Name in film	Real location
Borges	Catedral
Ciudad Universitaria	Independencia
Dock Sud	San José vieja
Parque 1	Independencia
Parque 2	San José vieja
Parque 3	San José
Sur	Avenida La Plata

== Cast ==
- Guillermo Angelelli ... Daniel Pratt
- Roberto Carnaghi ... Marcos Blasi
- Annabella Levy ... Abril
- Jorge Petraglia ... Mistein
- Miguel Ángel Paludi ... Aguirre
- Fernando Llosa ... Nazar
- Martín Adjemián ... Canotti
- Daniel Di Biase ... Kenn
- Jean Pierre Reguerraz ... Deckes
- Martín Pavlovsky ... Driver 101
- Felipe Méndez ... Transhipment Manager
- Fernando Cia ... Figas
- Osvaldo Santoro ... Vega
- Horacio Roca ... Edmundo
- Nora Zinsky ... Female Professor
- Sammy Lerner ... Old man in the file room
- Rodolfo Franghi ... Mussio (as Rodolfo Franggi)

== See also ==
- Cinema of Argentina
- List of films about mathematicians
