= Plaza de los Virreyes - Eva Perón (Buenos Aires Underground) =

Buenos Aires Underground station

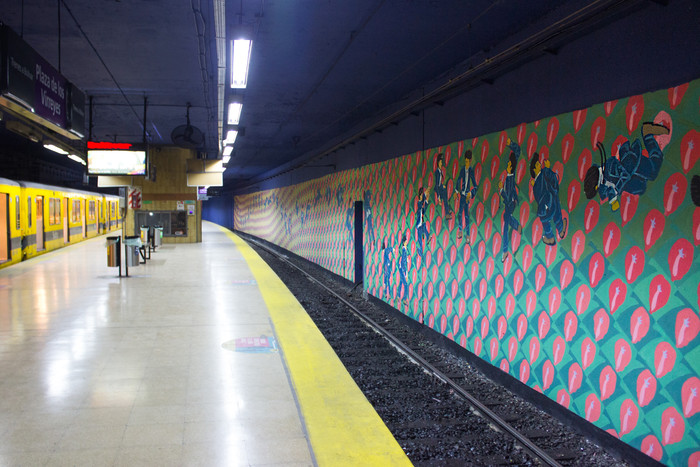

General information
- Location: Lafuente 1000
- Coordinates: 34°38′34.9″S 58°27′41.8″W
- Platforms: Island platforms

History
- Opened: 8 May 1986

Services
Preceding station	Buenos Aires Underground	Following station
Terminus	Line E Transfer to: Intendente Saguier	Varela towards Retiro
Location

Plaza de los Virreyes - Eva Perón is a station on Line E of the Buenos Aires Underground and is the current terminus. The station was opened on 8 May 1986 as the western terminus of the one-line extension from Varela. It was originally called Plaza de los Virreyes; however, Eva Perón was added to the name of the station to commemorate Eva Duarte de Perón, the prominent Argentine historical figure. The Premetro connects here at Intendente Saguier station.

This station is the second-southernmost metro station in the world, after Melbourne's Anzac railway station.
