= Sáenz (Buenos Aires Underground) =

Buenos Aires Underground station

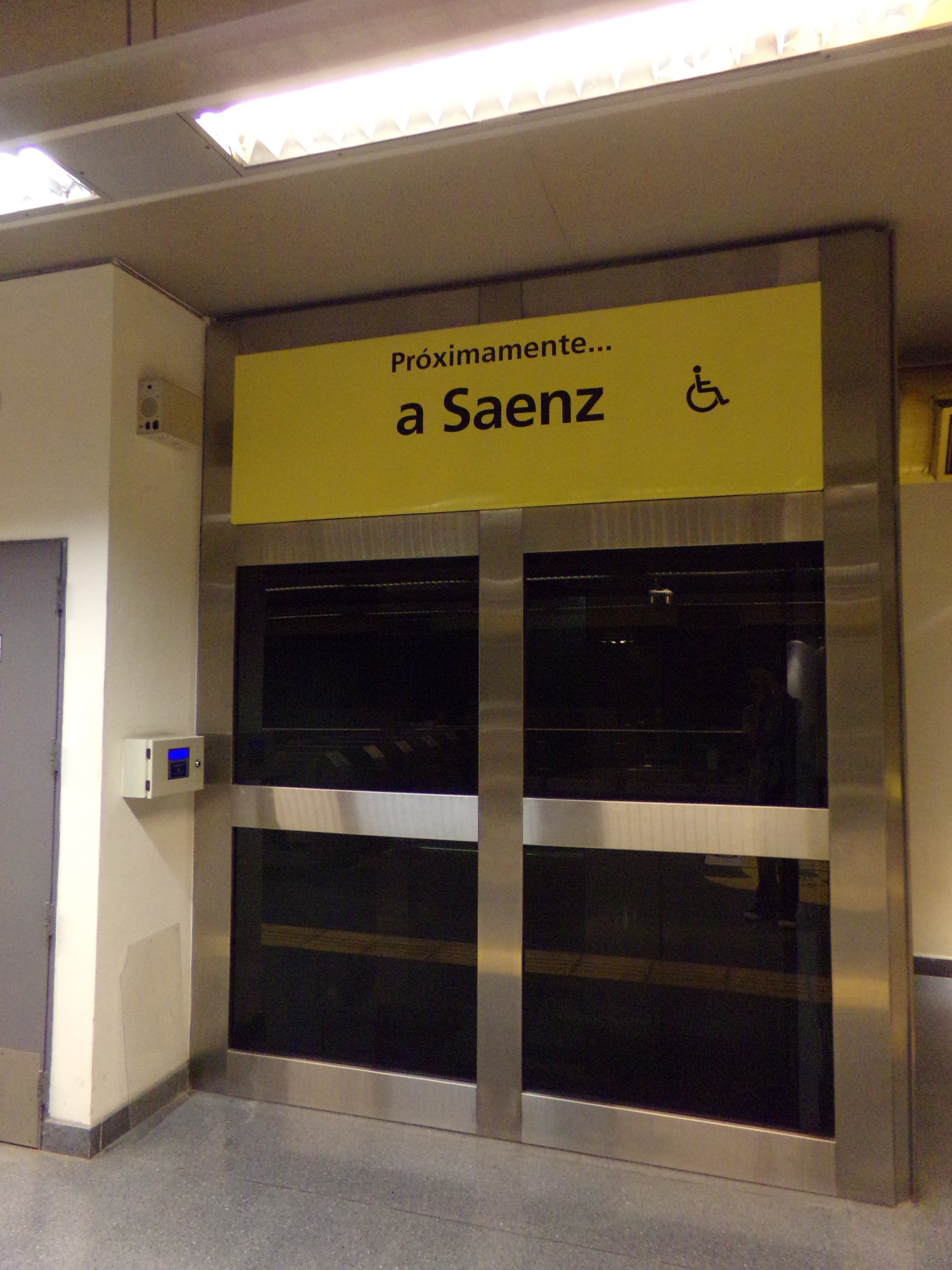

General information
- Platforms: Island platforms
- Connections: Belgrano Sur Line

History
- Opening: 2020s

Services
Preceding station	Buenos Aires Underground	Following station
Hospitales towards Facultad de Derecho	Line H	Terminus

Sáenz is a station under construction and the future terminus of Line H of the Buenos Aires Underground. Once complete, the station will connect with the Belgrano Sur commuter rail line and the Metrobus Sur BRT line in a new facility designed for the connection of the three lines.

Construction began in 2012, along with Facultad de Derecho, Las Heras, Santa Fe and Córdoba stations; however, it was decided to prioritise the northern extension and Sáenz will open in the 2020s instead of with the other stations in 2015.
