= Buenos Aires Underground 300 Series =

Railcars used on the Buenos Aires Underground

300 Series
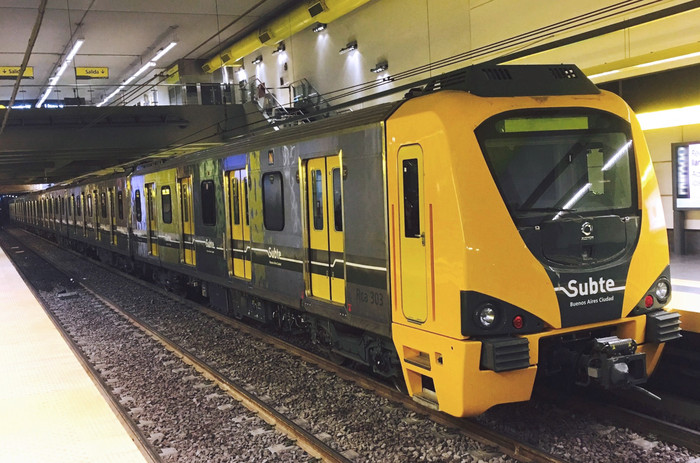
- A 300 Series train on Line H undergoing tests before its introduction
- In service: July 2016-present
- Manufacturer: Alstom
- Family name: Alstom Metropolis
- Replaced: Siemens O&K; Fiat-Materfer
- Constructed: 2014-2019
- Entered service: July 2016
- Number built: 78; 42
- Number in service: 120
- Formation: 6 cars per trainset
- Capacity: 270 (seated)
- Operator: Buenos Aires Underground

Specifications
- Car body construction: Stainless steel
- Car length: 17 m (55 ft 9 1/4 in)
- Width: 2,600 mm (8 ft 6 3/8 in)
- Doors: 4 per side
- Traction system: Alstom Optonix
- Electric system: 1500 V DC overhead lines
- Track gauge: 1,435 mm (4 ft 8 1/2 in) standard gauge

The 300 Series are a set of underground cars manufactured by Alstom in Brazil for use on the Buenos Aires Underground. They are used on Line H of the network, and more have been introduced on Line D where they operate alongside the similar 100 Series.

== History ==
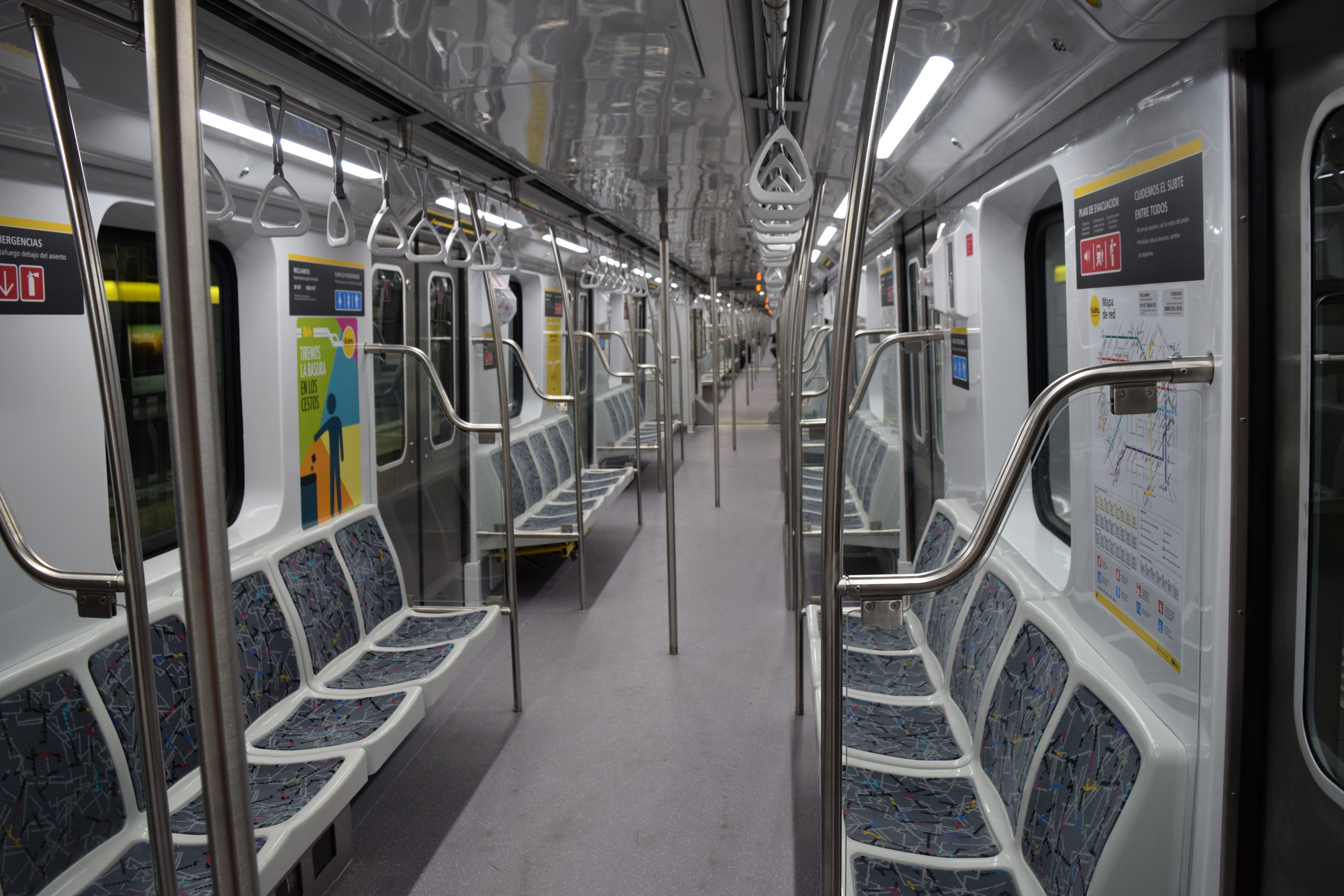
Interior of one of the cars

The 300 Series cars were initially ordered for Line H in 2012 with an initial order of 120 cars at a cost of US$ 216 million. These were to be delivered in 2015 and produced solely in Alstom's plant in São Paulo, unlike the 100 Series which also had components produced in Argentina. These were to be put into service once the Córdoba, Santa Fe and Las Heras stations were opened.

On Line H, the cars replaced the Siemens-Schuckert Orenstein & Koppel cars which had served on every line of the system, with the exception of Line B, at different times since 1934. When Line H was originally opened, it was not deemed necessary to purchase new stock until it had been extended enough and passenger numbers were at a level where new rolling stock was warranted. Thus the Siemens O&K cars were brought out of retirement temporarily. In July 2016, 36 of the Alstom cars were put into service on Line H, leading to the withdrawal of the Siemens cars, while the remaining cars and those for Line D were put into service gradually until 2017.

In late 2014, the order was expanded by 50% to include an additional 60 cars for Line D to replace the ageing Fiat-Materfer cars built in the early 1980s. Unlike Line H, whose now consists of 300 series cars, Line D cars operate alongside the 100 Series, which are also Alstom Metropolis cars and bear similarities.

== Characteristics ==
The cars are designed to work with Communication Based Train Control (CBTC) to ensure a better frequency on the lines. They come installed with security cameras, audio warnings for approaching stations and are accessible to the disabled.

The cars also have air conditioning and a system to prevent cars from stacking atop one another in the event of a collision, as well as being equipped with black boxes in the conductor's cabins.

== Gallery ==
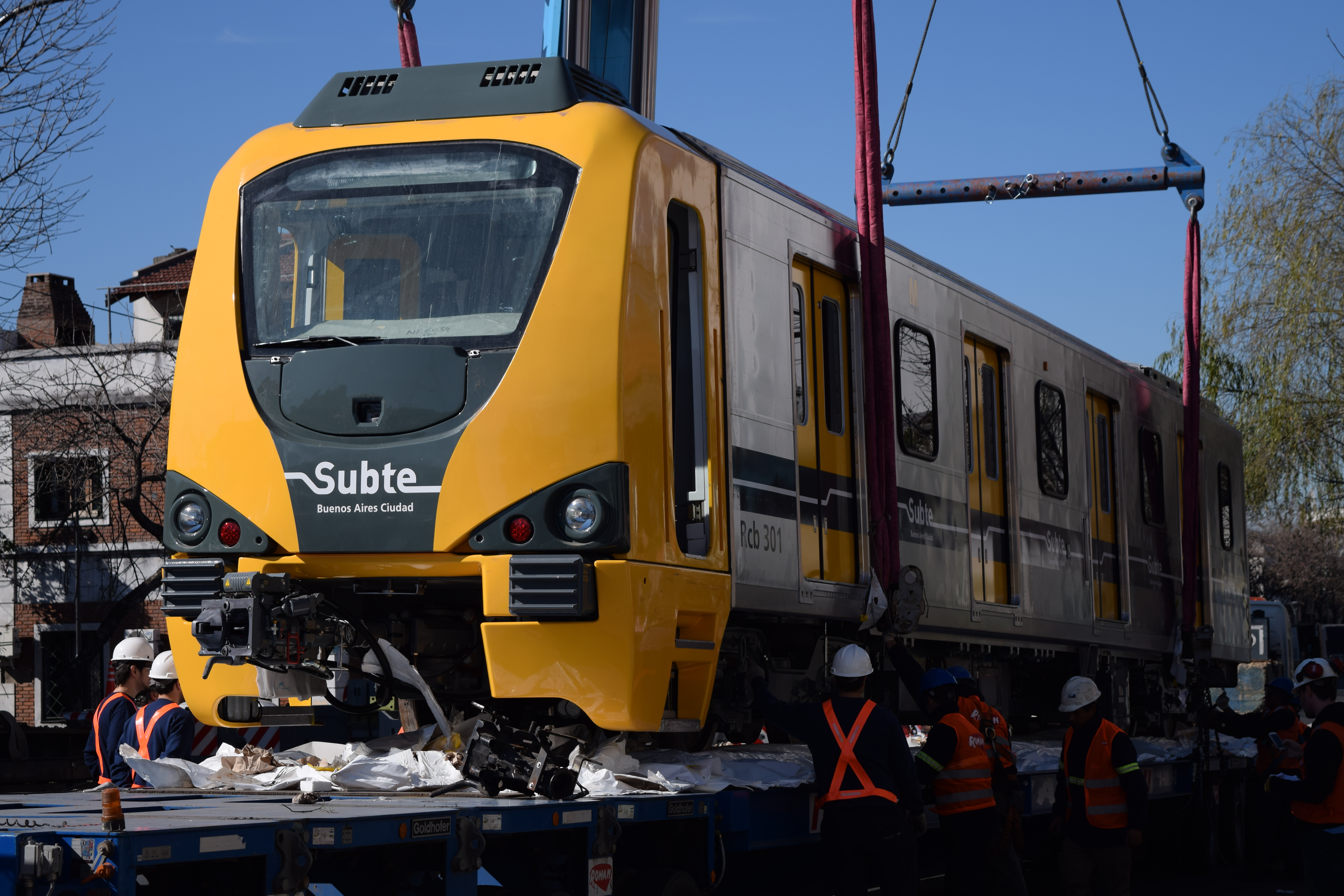
First cars being loaded into Line H

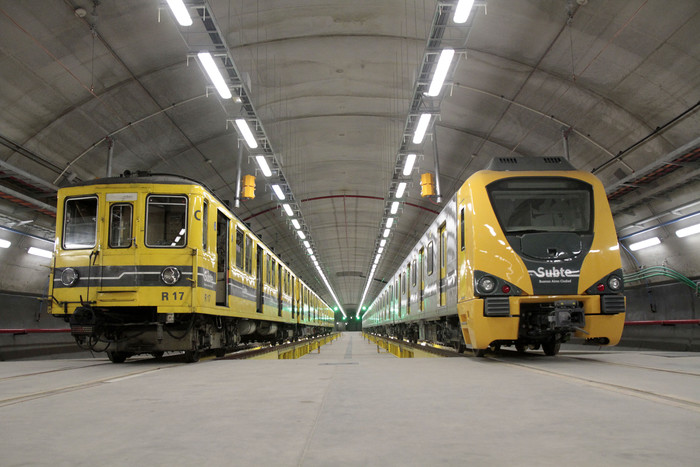
The 300 series replaced the aged Siemens-Schuckert Orenstein & Koppel cars

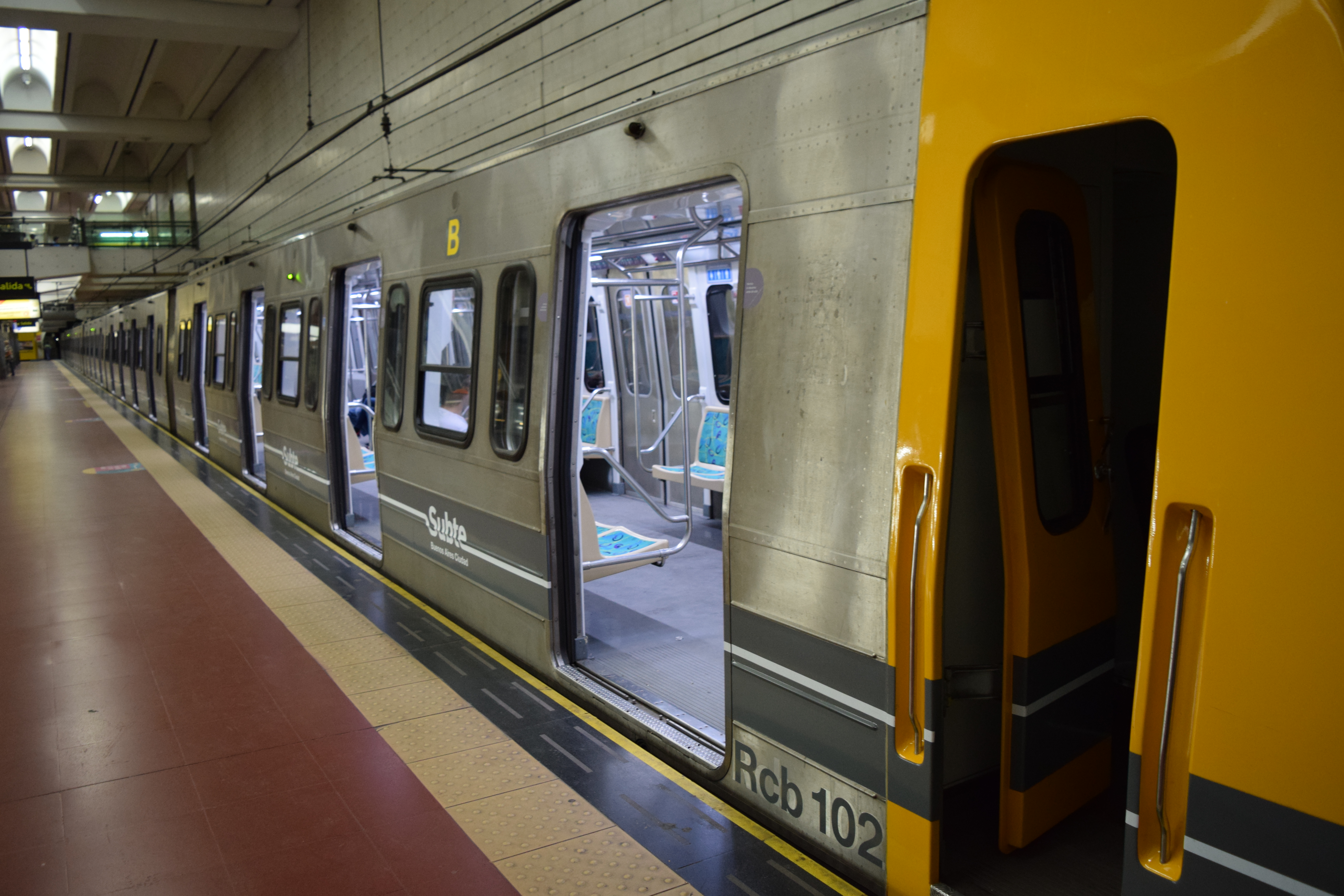
The 100 Series has a number of similarities to the 300 series

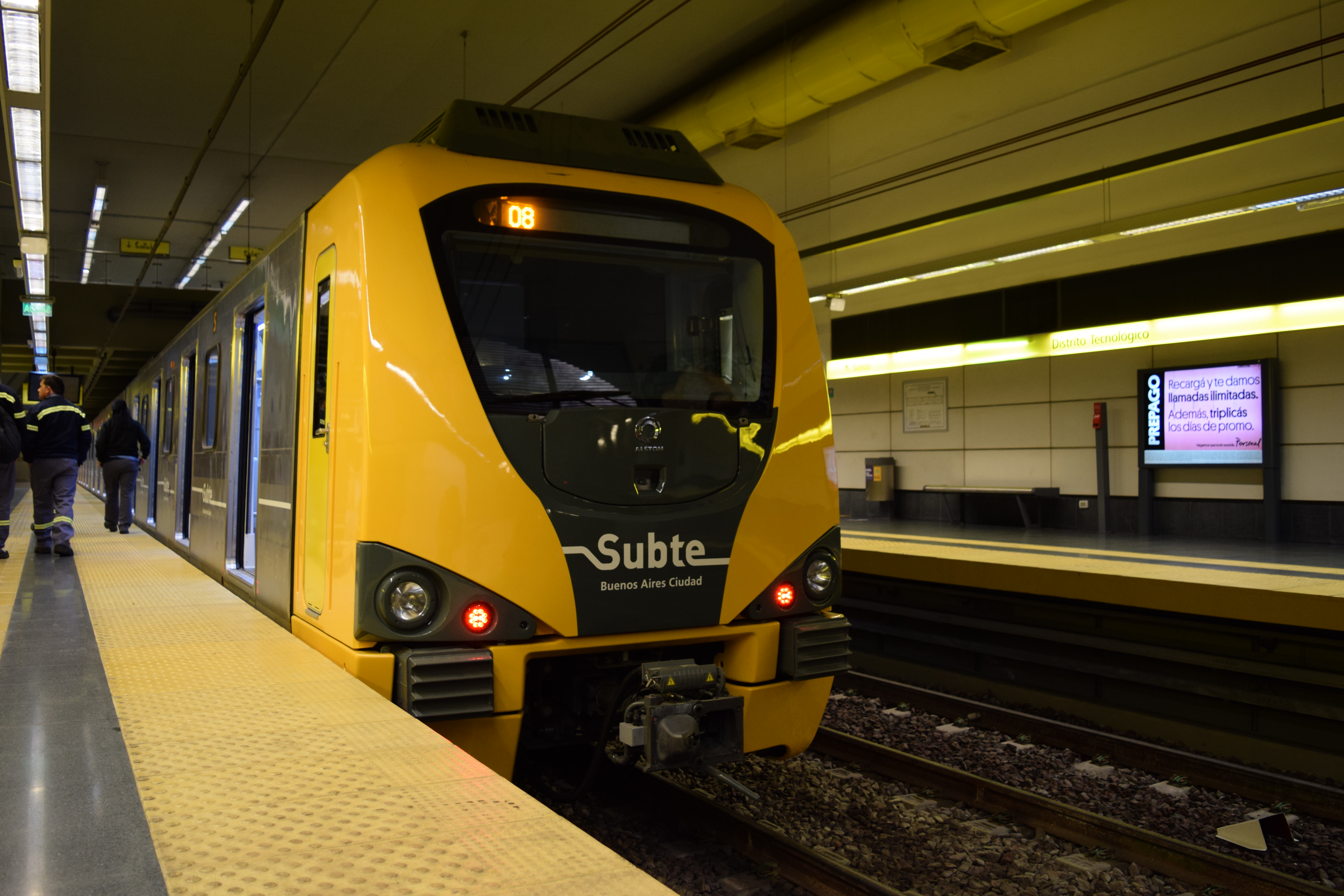
A train on Line H

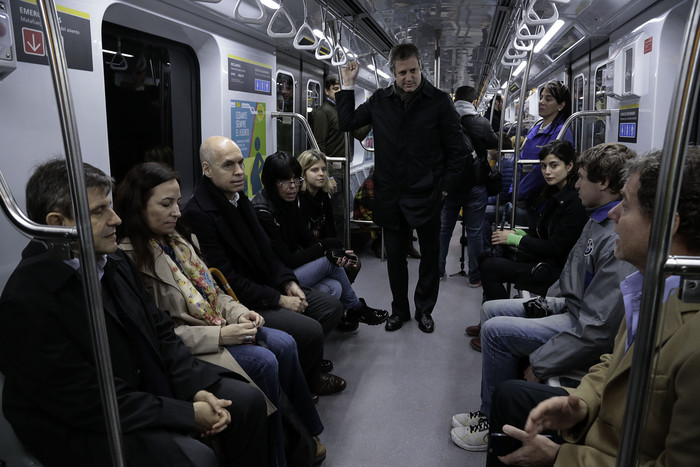
Mayor Horacio Rodriguez Larreta on the inaugural trip

== See also ==
- Buenos Aires Underground rolling stock
- Alstom Metropolis
- Buenos Aires Underground 100 Series
- Buenos Aires Underground 200 Series
