= Córdoba (Buenos Aires Underground) =

Buenos Aires Underground station

Coordinates: 34.5986°S 58.4039°W

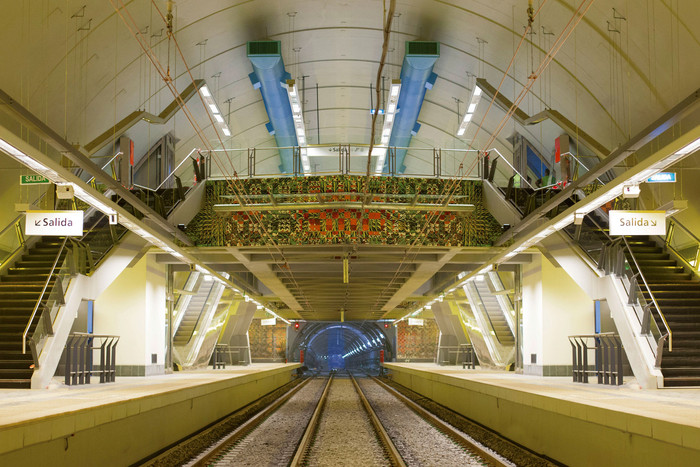

General information
- Location: Pueyrredón and Córdoba
- Platforms: Side platforms

History
- Opened: December 18 2015

Services
Preceding station	Buenos Aires Underground	Following station
Santa Fe towards Facultad de Derecho	Line H	Corrientes towards Hospitales
Location

Córdoba Station is a station on Line H of the Buenos Aires Underground, opened in 2015. It is located in the junction of Córdoba and Pueyrredón Avenues, in the limit with Balvanera and Recoleta neighborhoods. It is near to the University of Buenos Aires faculties of Economics, Pharmacy and Medicine. The station was opened on 18 December 2015 as part of the extension of the line from Corrientes to Las Heras.

It counts on an underground typology with two lateral platforms and two railways.
