= Fiat-Materfer (Buenos Aires Underground) =

Trains used on the Buenos Aires Underground

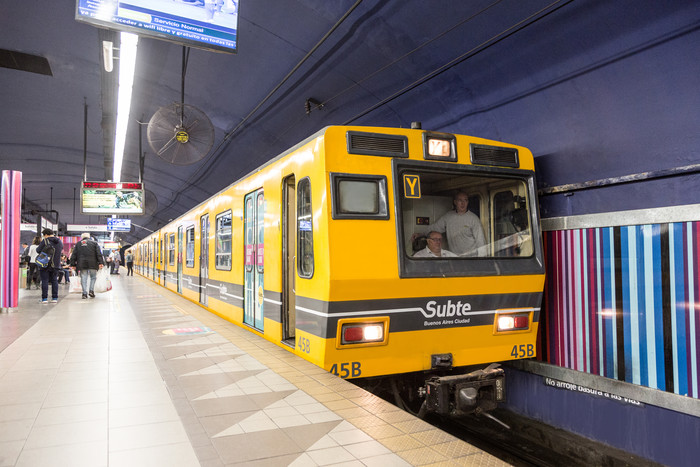
- Fiat-Materfer at Bolívar station on Line E
- In service: 1980-Present
- Manufacturer: Materfer
- Built at: Córdoba, Argentina
- Replaced: Siemens O&K; La Brugeoise cars CAF-GEE
- Constructed: 1980-1997
- Entered service: June 1980
- Number in service: 95 cars
- Successor: 300 Series; 200 Series
- Formation: 5-6 cars per trainset
- Operators: Buenos Aires Underground
- Lines served: 1980-Present; 1980-2018; 2008-2017

Specifications
- Car body construction: Stainless steel
- Doors: 4 per side
- Track gauge: 1,435 mm (4 ft 8 1/2 in)

The Fiat-Materfer Buenos Aires Underground rolling stock was built by the Argentine company Materfer - then a subsidiary of Fiat Ferroviaria - beginning in 1980 and continuing on through that decade. It was originally conceived to standardise the diverse rolling stock of the Buenos Aires Underground with the use of one model throughout all the lines. However, with the economic and political turmoil faced in the country during and following the collapse of the National Reorganisation Process junta in 1983, its production ended up being far more limited. During the 2010s, the cars were used as temporary stock for two lines, being phased out as newer models arrived from overseas.

== History and overview ==
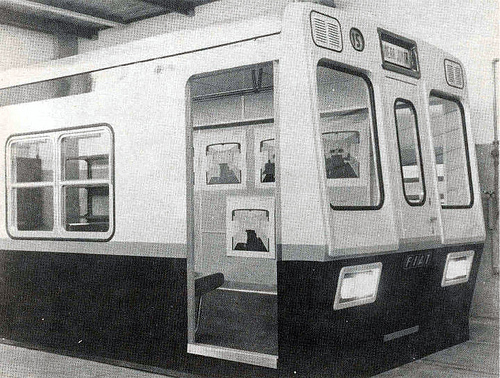
The first prototype presented in 1978. The split windows were changed for a single window in the production version.

By the late 1970s, the Buenos Aires Underground had a vast array of ageing rolling stock. This was because the different lines were developed by different companies in different periods. Yet the need for standardisation was becoming apparent given the increased cost of dealing with so many different models. One challenge was the use of 1100 V electrification on Line A (though it was converted to 1500 V in 2013) and 1500 V on other lines, but also the use of third rail on Line B while all others used overhead lines.

In 1978, Materfer presented a prototype vehicle which solved the issue of the different voltages by providing a model which could be easily switched between the two voltages, though Line B would remain an independent entity in the underground network. The trains were produced throughout the 1980s for use on Line E, however due to the economic problems in the country at the time, they never attained widespread use on the rest of the network since there was not the funding available to purchase new rolling stock for all the lines.

== Current use ==
A Fiat-Materfer at San José de Flores station on Line A.

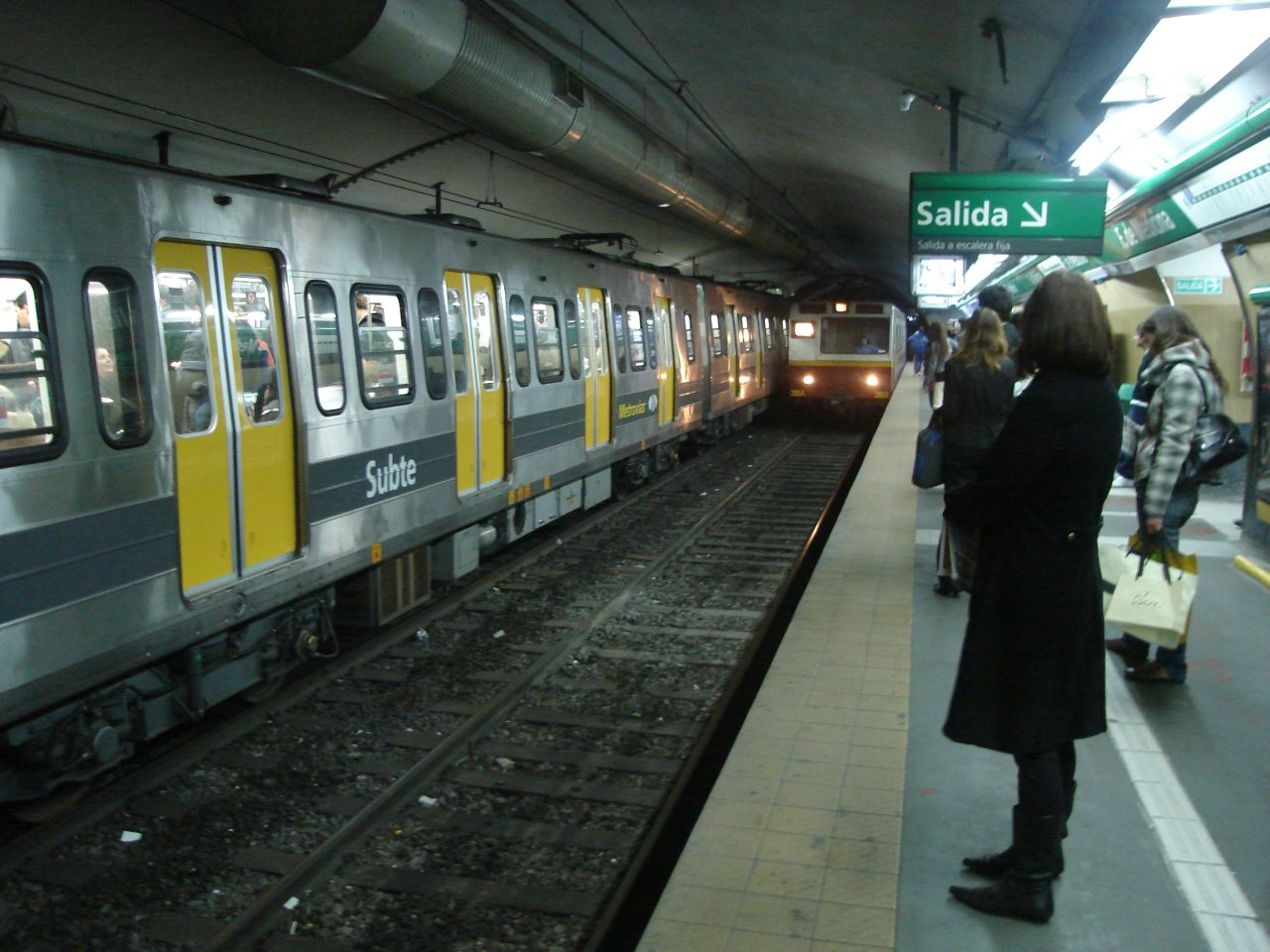
Fiat-Materfer passing a 100 Series car on Line D.

Over the years, the cars have seen cosmetic upgrades, as well as technical ones, such as the incorporation of Automatic Train Protection, the new Line H, and ability to play pre-recorded messages through its speakers, a feature which, unusually, was left out at the time of production. While the Fiat-Materfer trainsets briefly made up the entire rolling stock of Line E, during the 2010s they were used on Line D and Line A as temporary rolling stock alongside newer trains while more of the newer cars arrived. After the new Buenos Aires Underground 300 Series arrived for these lines, the Fiat-Materfer trains were stored, with the intention that they then be incorporated into Line E once again in time for its extension to Retiro station. Most of the new cars were transferred to Line H though.

On Line D they operated alongside Alstom Metropolis trains. The Alstom trains were originally intended to make up the entire rolling stock of the line and began operating in 2001, however due to the economic crisis in the country that year, only 80 of the 120 cars were bought for the line and the Fiat-Materfer trains were used to fill in the shortfall. In 2008, 14 more of the Alstom trains were eventually bought and used on the line, while a further 24 arrived between 2015 and 2016, meaning that the Fiat-Materfer cars were then retired.

Similarly, the retirement of the La Brugeoise cars from Line A in 2013, as well as the presence of only 45 new CITIC-CNR cars at the time of retirement, meant that Fiat-Materfer cars needed to be incorporated into the line in order to make up shortfalls while the other 105 cars arrived from China. Ironically, the line had also been converted to 1500 volts that same year to incorporate the new CNR trains so the easy 1100 V to 1500 V conversion which the Fiat-Materfer cars were designed to have was ultimately never needed. The last of the CNR trains arrived before 2017 and the Fiat-Materfer trains were retired from the line.

== See also ==
- Buenos Aires Underground rolling stock
- Buenos Aires PreMetro - uses trams manufactured by the same company
- Fabricaciones Militares - the only other Argentine manufacturer of rolling stock for the Underground
- Moebius (1996 film) - Fiat-Materfer trains featured in the film
