= Siemens-Schuckert Orenstein & Koppel =

Railway cars formerly used on the Buenos Aires Underground

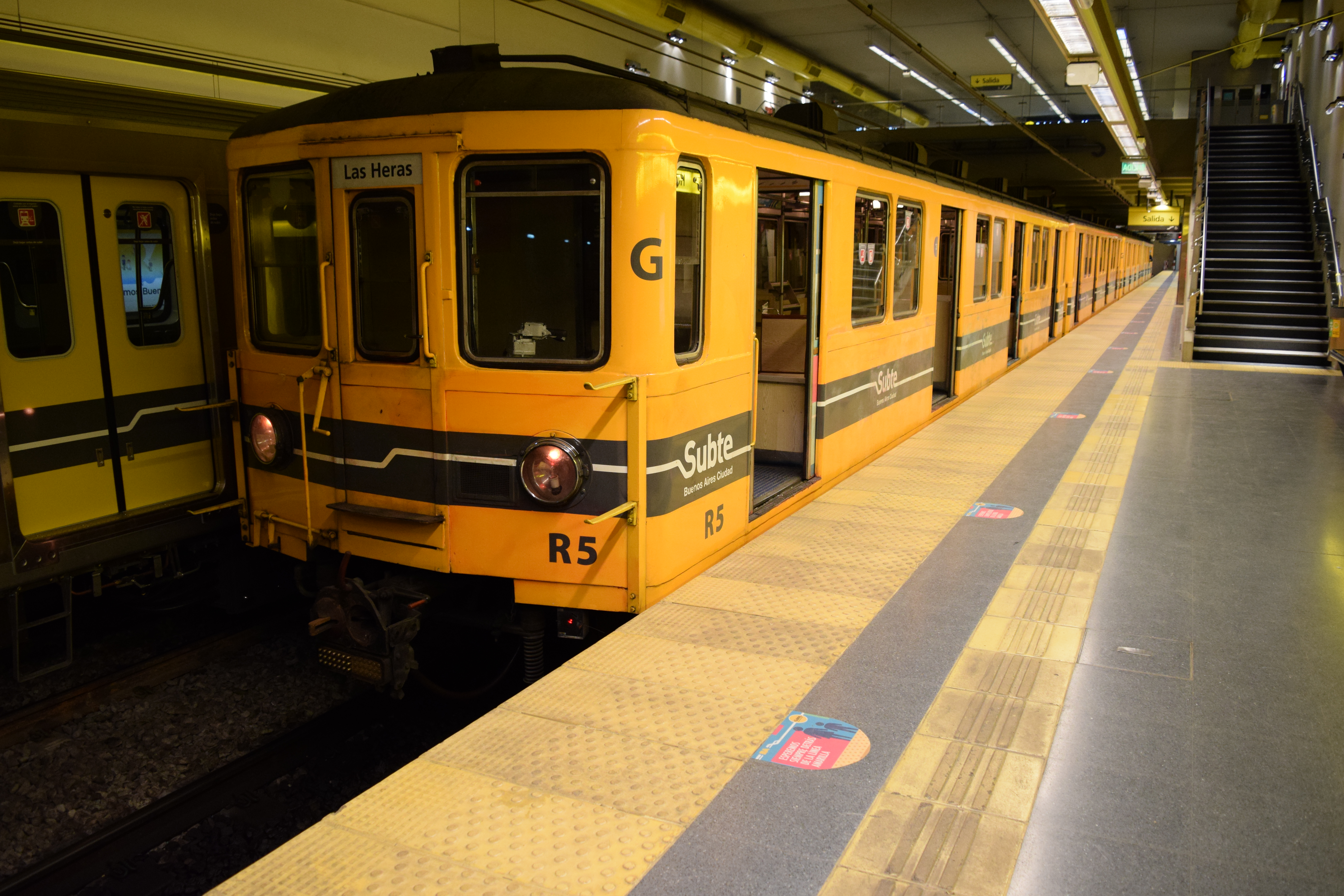
- Siemens O&K during its last day serving Line H, alongside its replacement 300 Series train.
- In service: 9 November 1934-2016 (Siemens-Schuckert); 1955-2016 (Orenstein & Koppel); 2014-2017 (Alstom)
- Manufacturers: Siemens-Schuckert, Orenstein & Koppel
- Constructed: 1934-1937-1944 (Germany); 1950-1955-1960 (Argentina); 2013 (Refurbished)
- Entered service: 1934
- Refurbished: 2013
- Scrapped: 2016 (non-refurbished)
- Number in service: 50 cars (refurbished Emepa cars)
- Successor: 100 Series; 300 Series; Fiat-Materfer
- Capacity: 162 seated per car
- Operator: Buenos Aires Underground
- Lines served: (former)

Specifications
- Car length: 17 m (55 ft 9 1/4 in)
- Width: 2.6 m (8 ft 6 3/8 in)
- Height: 2.34 m (7 ft 8 1/8 in) (?); 3.34 m (10 ft 11 1/2 in) (?)
- Doors: 4 per side
- Maximum speed: 65 km/h (40 mph)
- Weight: 32 tonnes (31 long tons; 35 short tons) per car
- Power output: 115 kW (154 hp) per traction motor
- Electric system: 1500 V DC Overhead line
- Braking system: Pneumatic
- Track gauge: 1,435 mm (4 ft 8 1/2 in) standard gauge

The Siemens-Schuckert Orenstein & Koppel (normally abbreviated to Siemens O&K) is an underground car formerly used on the Buenos Aires Underground first built by Siemens-Schuckert and Orenstein & Koppel in 1934, 1937 and 1944 with a smaller number of cars built in Argentina during the 1950s. The Siemens O&K rolling stock made up the entirety of the trains used on the three lines built by the Hispanic-Argentine Company for Public Works and Finances (CHADOPyF) and has since served on every line of the Underground (with the exception of Line B, which uses third rail electrification) from 1934 to 2016, with cars refurbished by the Emepa Group and Alstom continued to function on the network till 2017.

As such, it has been the most widely used rolling stock in the Underground's history, and second only to the Brugeoise cars in the number of years served, being the oldest cars in circulation at the time of their retirement in 2016.

== History ==
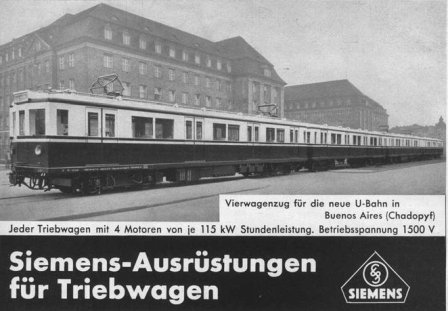
Siemens advertisement showing the cars outside the Siemens headquarters in Berlin, Germany (c.1934).

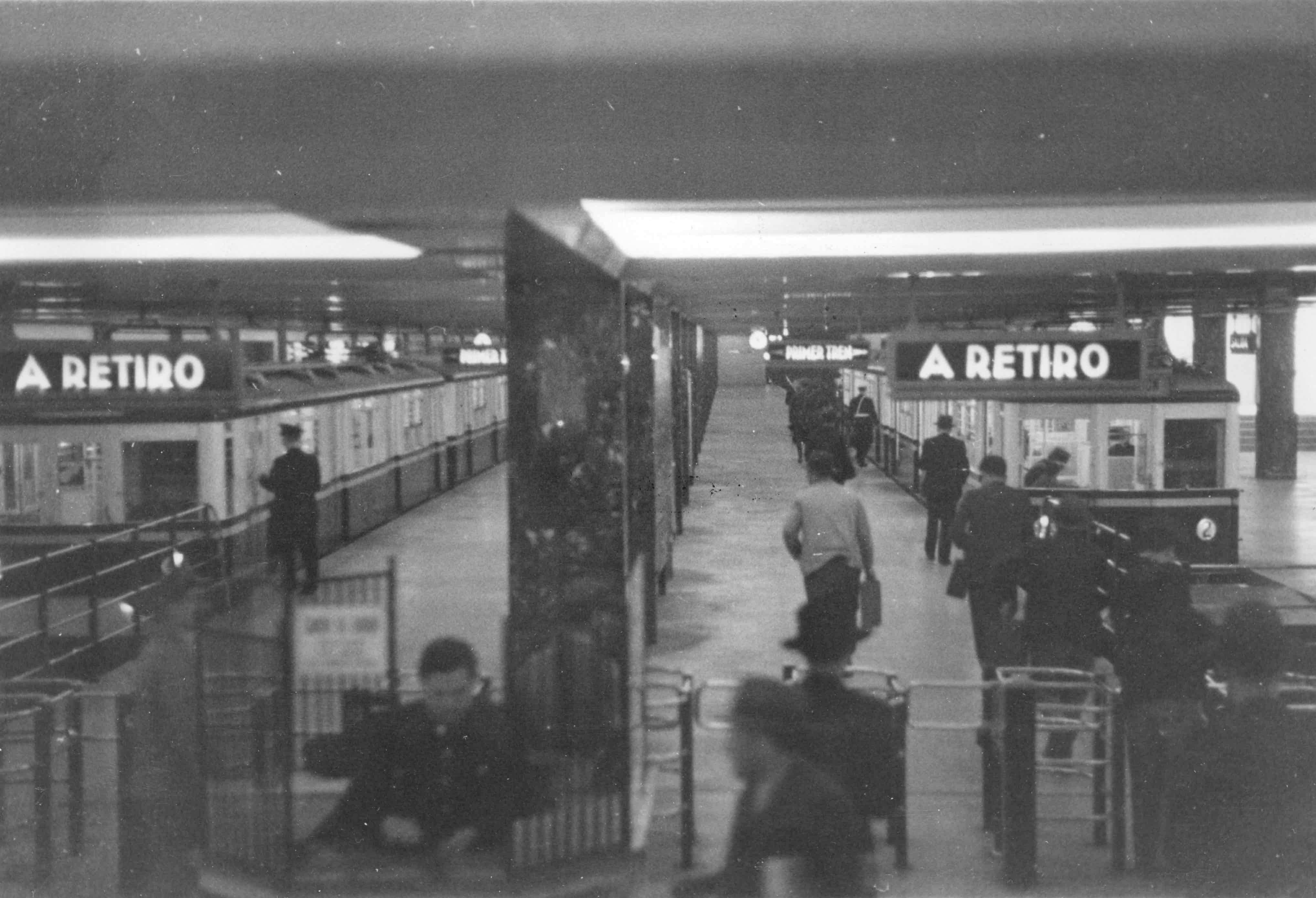
Siemens O&K cars at Constitución on Line C (c.1934).

The first Siemens-Schuckert Orenstein & Koppel cars were purchased in 1933 by the Hispanic-Argentine Company for Public Works and Finances (CHADOPyF) for the first line constructed by the company in the city, Line C (then known as Line 1, though it was the third to be built in the city), which was opened in 1934. The Siemens O&K rolling stock made up the entirety of the line until 2007, when Japanese Nagoya trains were transferred from Line D and the Siemens cars were all sent to the newly inaugurated Line H, with newer Nagoya trains also arriving in the country for Line C in 2014.

When Line D was completed by CHADOPyF in 1937, the line was similarly served by Siemens O&K cars in its entirety, though these were replaced in 1999 by Nagoya trains and later by Alstom Metropolis trains in 2001. In 1944, Line E was the last of the CHADOPyF lines to be opened and was equally inaugurated with new Siemens O&K rolling stock ordered from Germany. With the three lines operating the same rolling stock during this time, it was the most standardised period in terms of rolling stock in the history of the Buenos Aires Underground. The three lines remained uniform until 1968, when CAF-GEE rolling stock was purchased to bolster numbers in Lines D and E, though these cars shared a similar design and technical specifications to the Siemens cars.

During the 1950s, as part of Juan Perón's five year plans, more of the Siemens cars were built in Argentina by the company Baseler. Just 13 of these cars were completed from 1955 to 1960 before the plan was scrapped following the Revolución Libertadora, while another 3 cars still in production remained partly finished and were ready to be scrapped in 2013.

A Siemens O&K train was used as the fictitious missing "UM-86" train in the 1996 Argentine science fiction film Moebius. Other trains of the same type are also shown in the film.

== Recent usage ==
Train leaving Parque Patricios station.

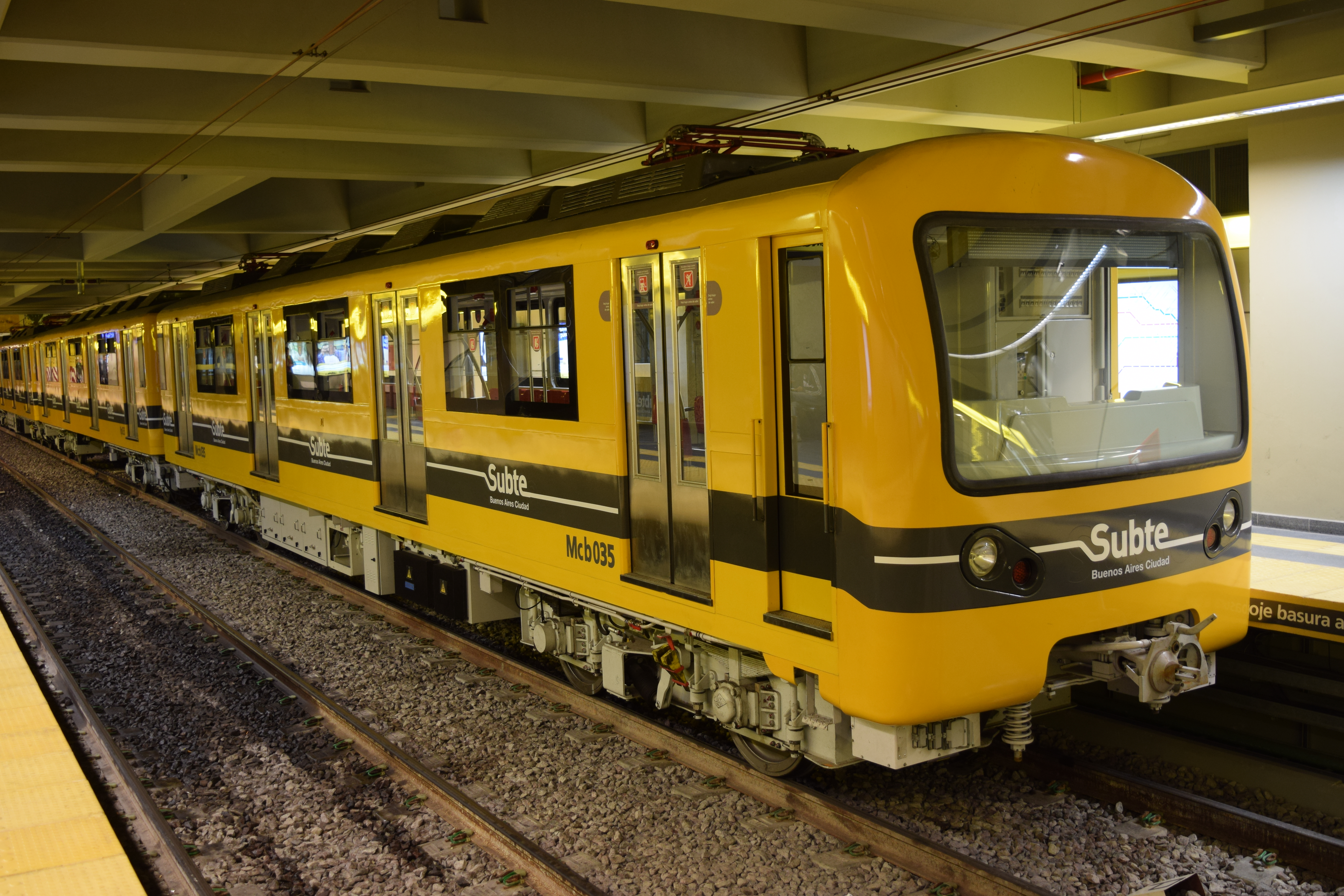
A refurbished Siemens-Emepa-Alstom train.

Though the Siemens O&K cars were due to be retired, they were put back into service in 2007 as temporary stock on Line H while newer rolling stock ordered in 2012 and 2014 arrived for the lines. The number of cars in operation gradually dwindled over this period as new stock arrived and the last cars were retired from the network in July 2016 when the Buenos Aires Underground 300 Series cars were put into service on Line H. On Line A, models refurbished by the Emepa Group are used as stand-ins until the remaining 200 Series cars are put into service.

When Line H was inaugurated in 2007, it was deemed unnecessary to purchase new rolling stock for the line until it had been sufficiently extended with high enough passenger numbers to warrant an entirely new fleet. The Siemens O&K cars were thus put back into service and were present in the inauguration of the line (which only had 5 stations at this point), making Line H the fourth line to be inaugurated with the cars and also the first line to be inaugurated with used rolling stock. As the line continued to be extended, 120 new 300 Series cars were ordered in 2012 to make up the entirety of the line's rolling stock, starting with the first 36 cars in 2016.

On Line A, Siemens O&K cars refurbished by Alstom and the Emepa Group serve alongside Fiat-Materfer cars as a temporary fleet while more 200 Series cars ordered in 2014 arrive on the line during 2015 and 2016. Originally only the Fiat-Materfer cars were to fulfil this function, but the shortfall of rolling stock caused by the retirement of the 120 La Brugeoise cars meant that the refurbished Siemens cars would be required until the line has all 150 of the CITIC-CNR cars in circulation. This also meant that the cars purchased by the CHADOPyF served for the first time on the line first built by their rivals, the Anglo-Argentine Tramways Company (AATC).

== Future ==
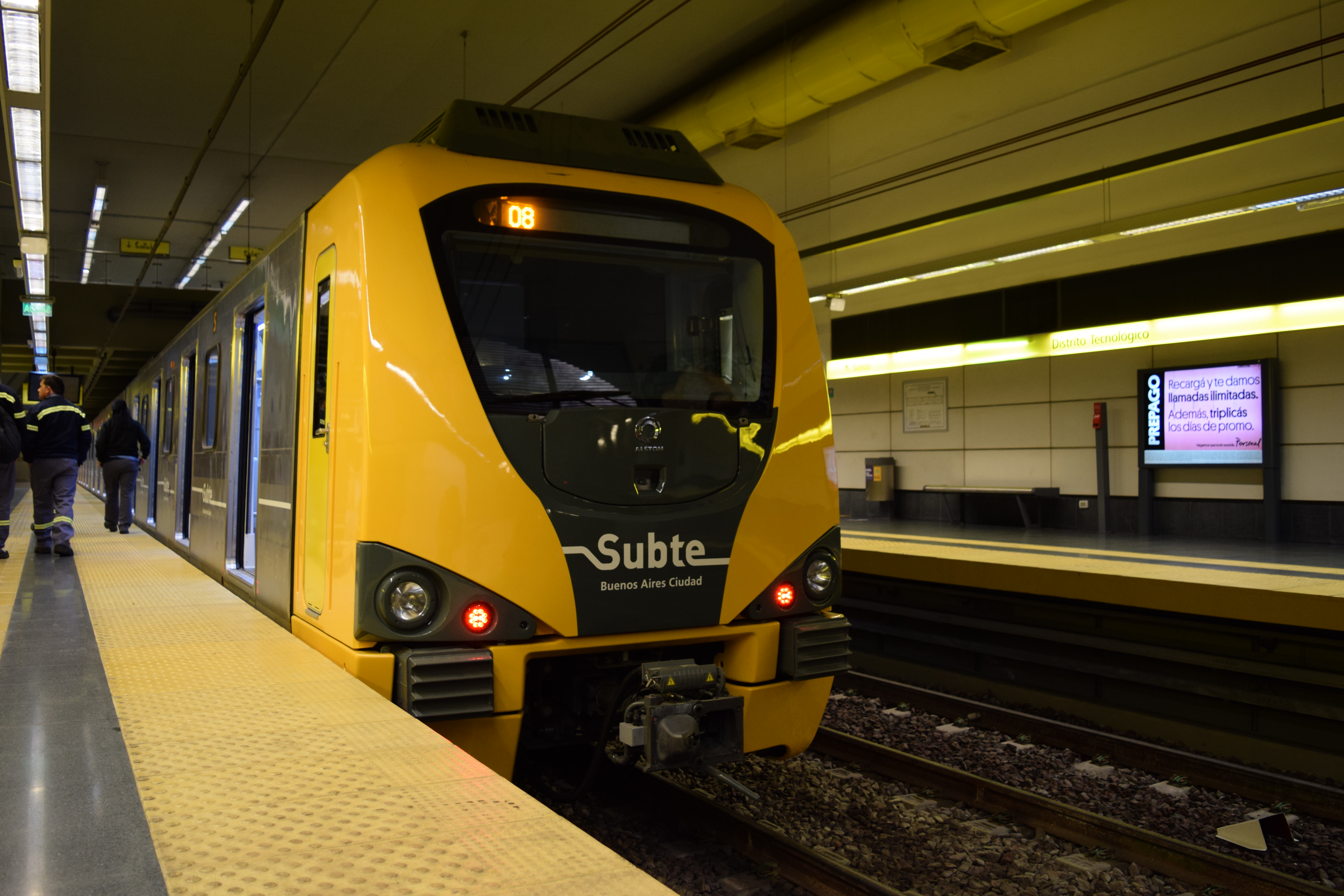
The 300 Series were among the cars used to replace the Siemens O&K stock.

Numerous efforts to refurbish the ageing Siemens-Schuckert Orenstein & Koppel cars have been proposed over the years, the last of which occurred after 2007 and considered refurbishing 86 cars along with the 64 CAF-GEE cars from Line E. This plan was scrapped, but then revived in 2013 after the retirement of the Brugeoise cars from Line A created a shortage of rolling stock on the line while new trains arrived. The Argentine Emepa Group and Alstom refurbished 10 cars for Line A, and then a further 40 cars were ordered for the network, making a total of 50 of these cars available. These have completely new interiors, a modernised exterior as well as an overhaul of its mechanical components.

The future of the older models retired from Line H is unclear and it has not been stated whether some or all of the cars will be preserved, or if any will be refurbished like the Siemens-Emepa-Alstom cars. It has been speculated that the refurbished cars will serve alongside the Fiat-Materfer cars when they are transferred to Line E, retiring the CAF GEE cars which currently serve on that line.

In January 2017, some of the cars were put for auction.

== Gallery ==
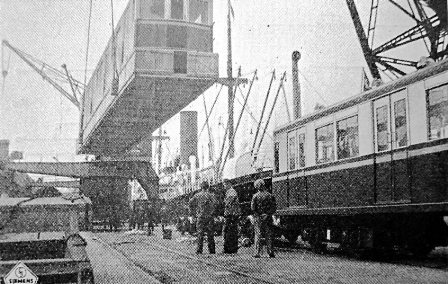
The first Siemens cars arriving at the port of Buenos Aires (c.1934)

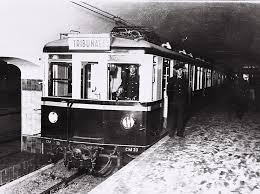
Siemens O&K at the inauguration of Line D (1937)

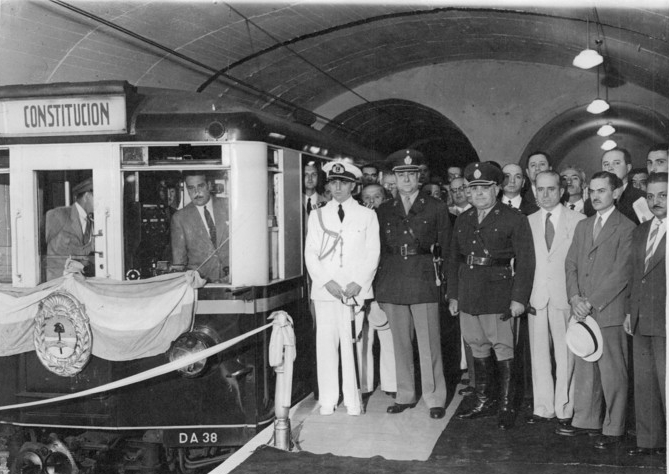
Siemens O&K Train at the inauguration of Line E (1944)

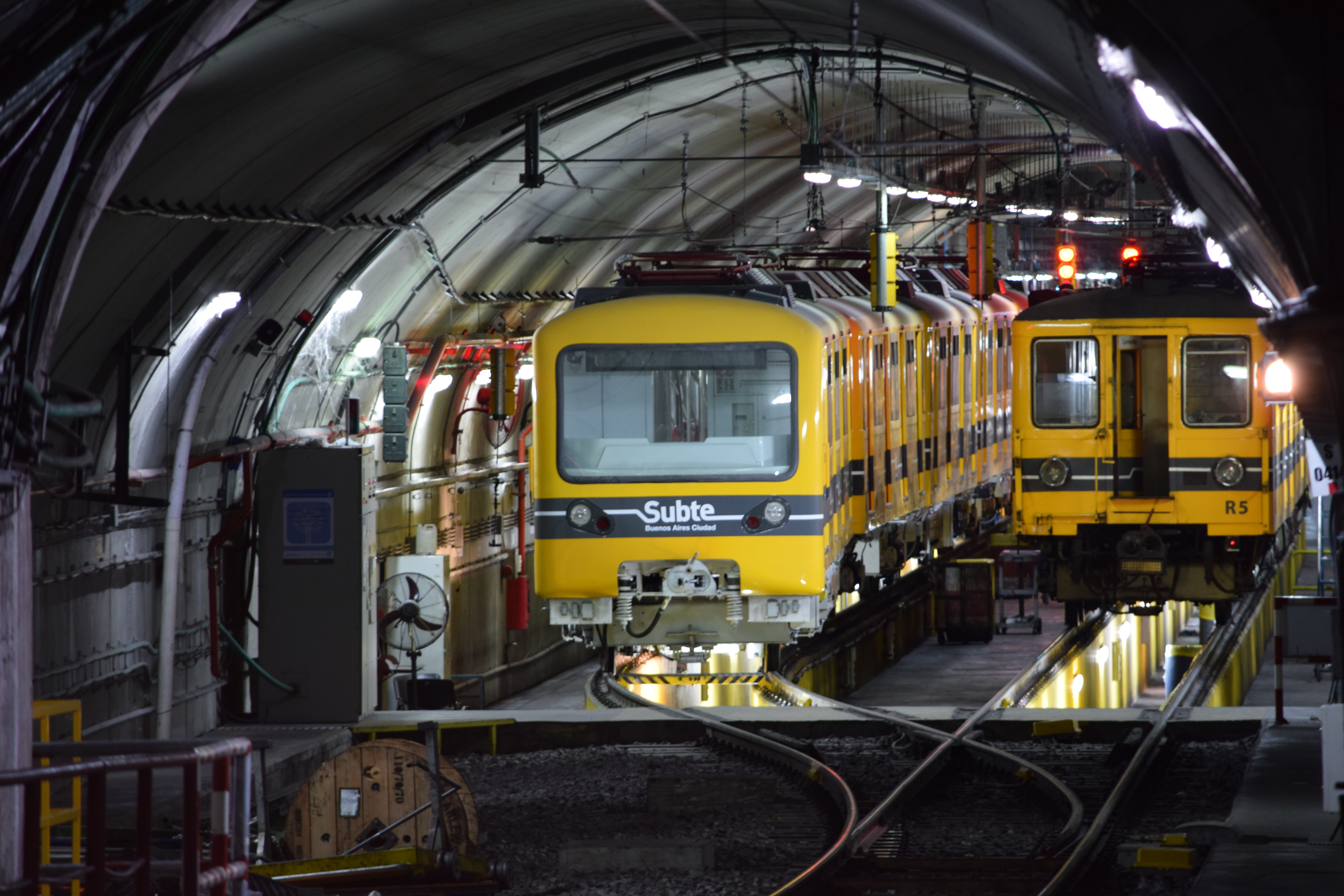
Original and refurbished cars at Line H workshops

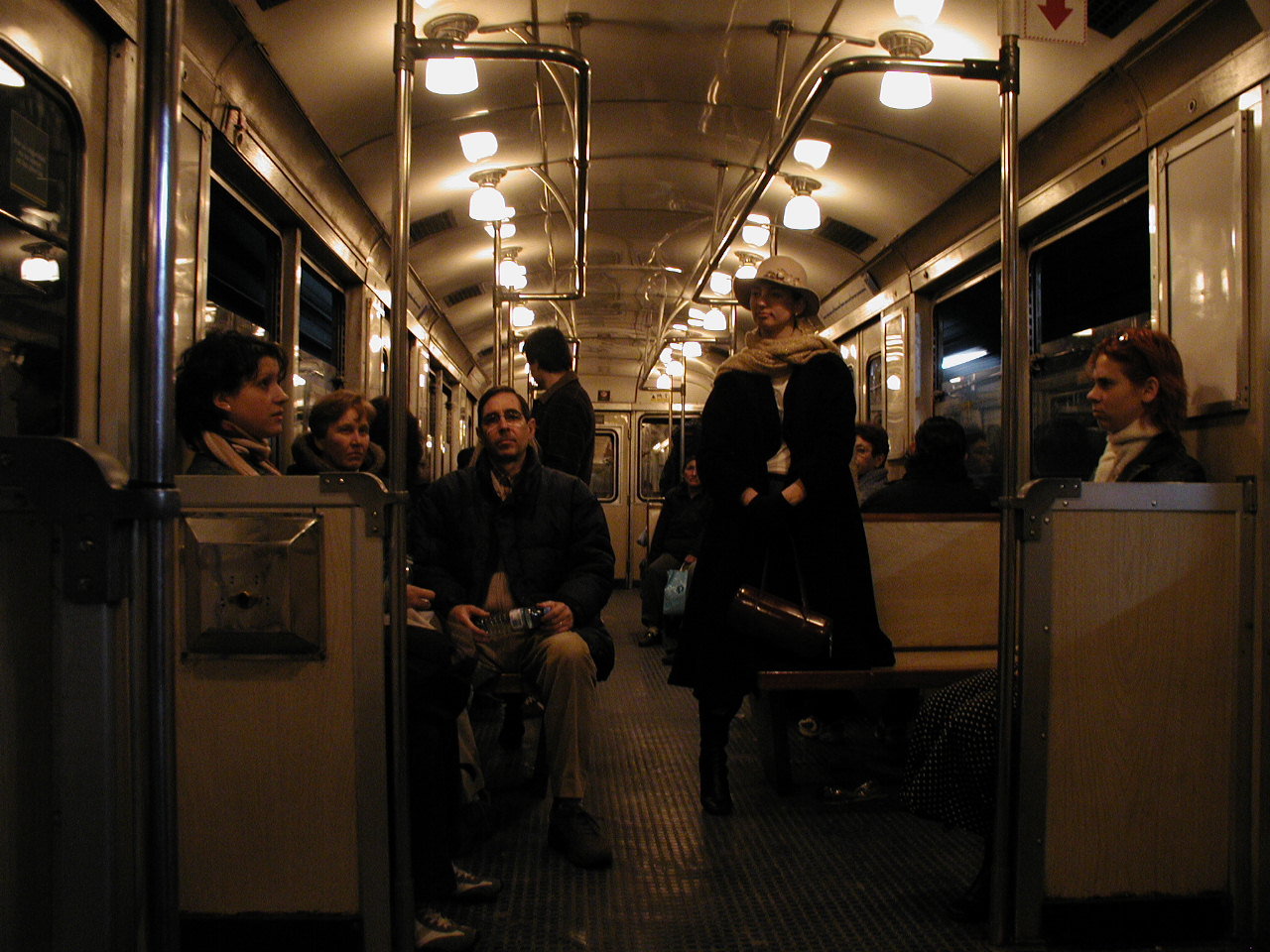
Passengers inside a car serving on Line C

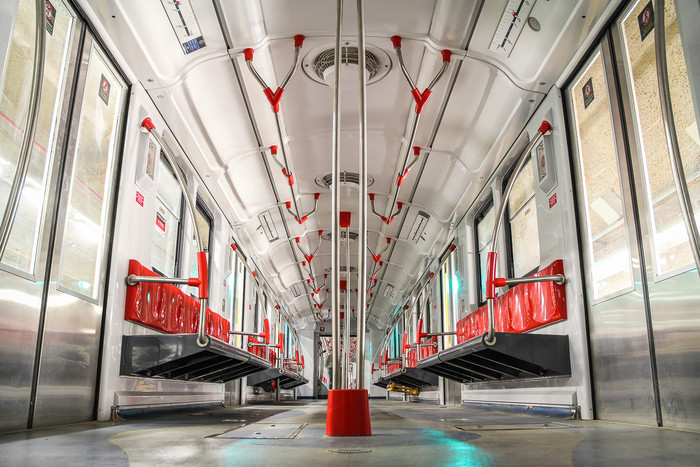
Interior of a refurbished car

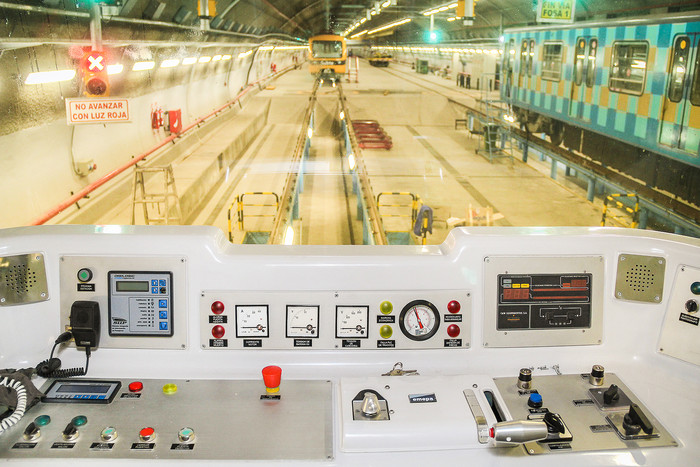
Conductor's cabin of a refurbished car

== See also ==
- Buenos Aires Underground rolling stock
- La Brugeoise cars (Buenos Aires Underground)
- UEC Preston
- Fiat-Materfer (Buenos Aires Underground)
- CITIC-CNR
