= Pueyrredón (Line D Buenos Aires Underground) =

Buenos Aires Underground station

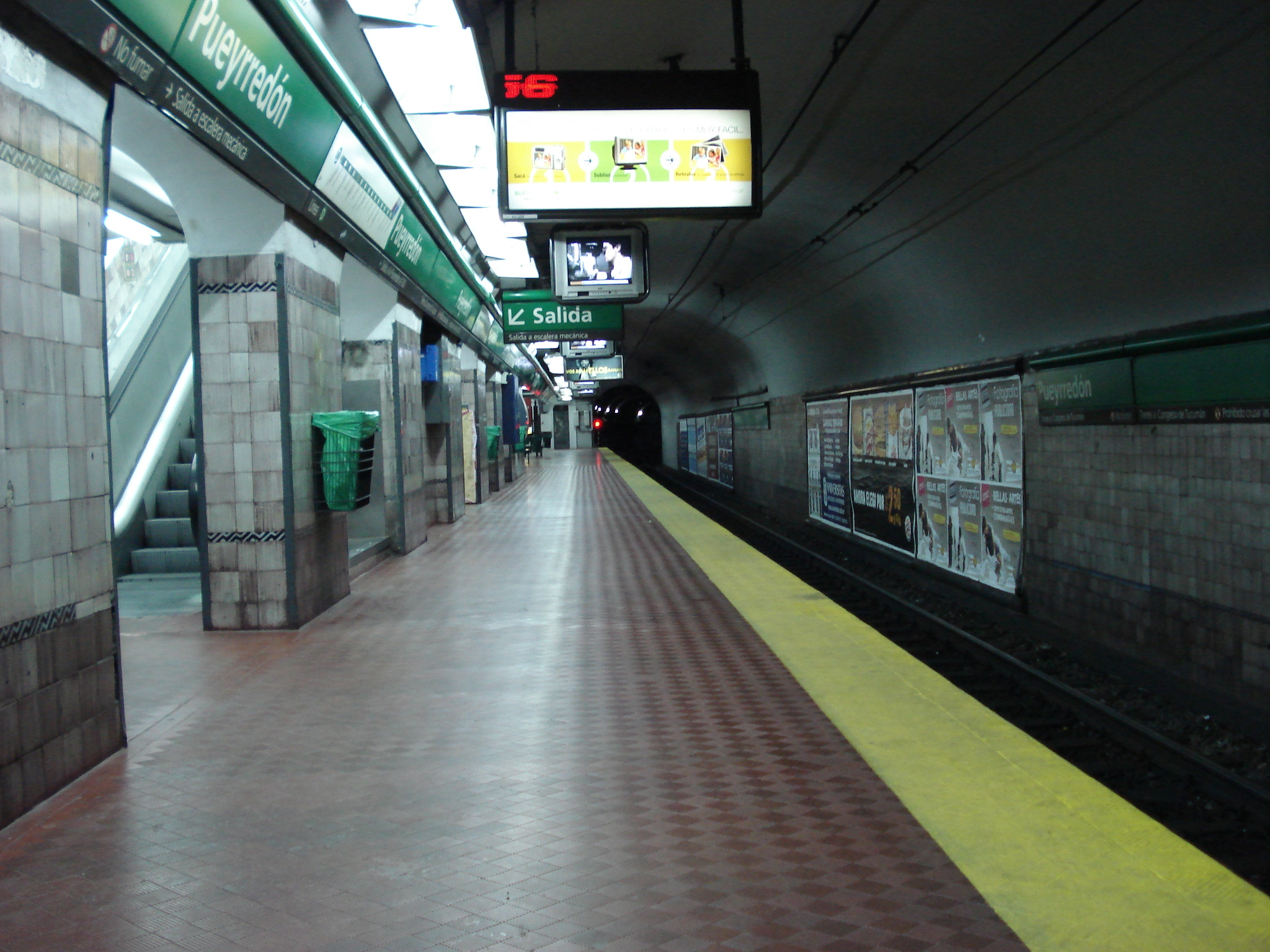

General information
- Location: Av. Santa Fe and Av. Pueyrredón
- Coordinates: 34°35′39.9″S 58°24′9.1″W
- Platforms: Island platforms

History
- Opened: 23 February 1940

Services
Preceding station	Buenos Aires Underground	Following station
Agüero towards Congreso de Tucumán	Line D	Facultad de Medicina towards Catedral
Las Heras towards Facultad de Derecho	Line H transfer at Santa Fe	Córdoba towards Hospitales
Location

Pueyrredón is a station on Line D of the Buenos Aires Underground. The station will have combinations with Line H at Santa Fe.

The station was opened on 23 February 1940 as part of the extension of Line D from Tribunales to Palermo.

== Gallery ==
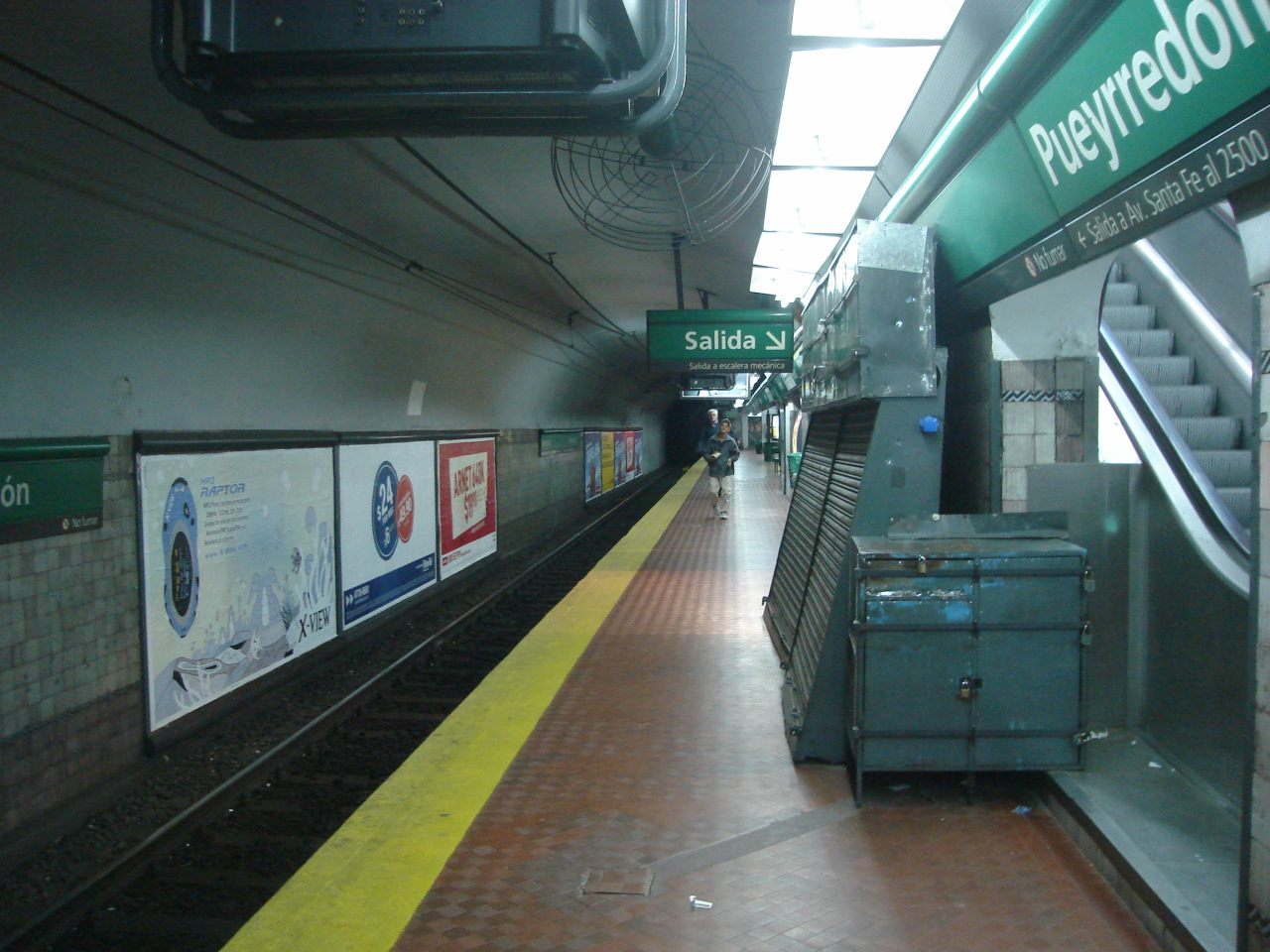

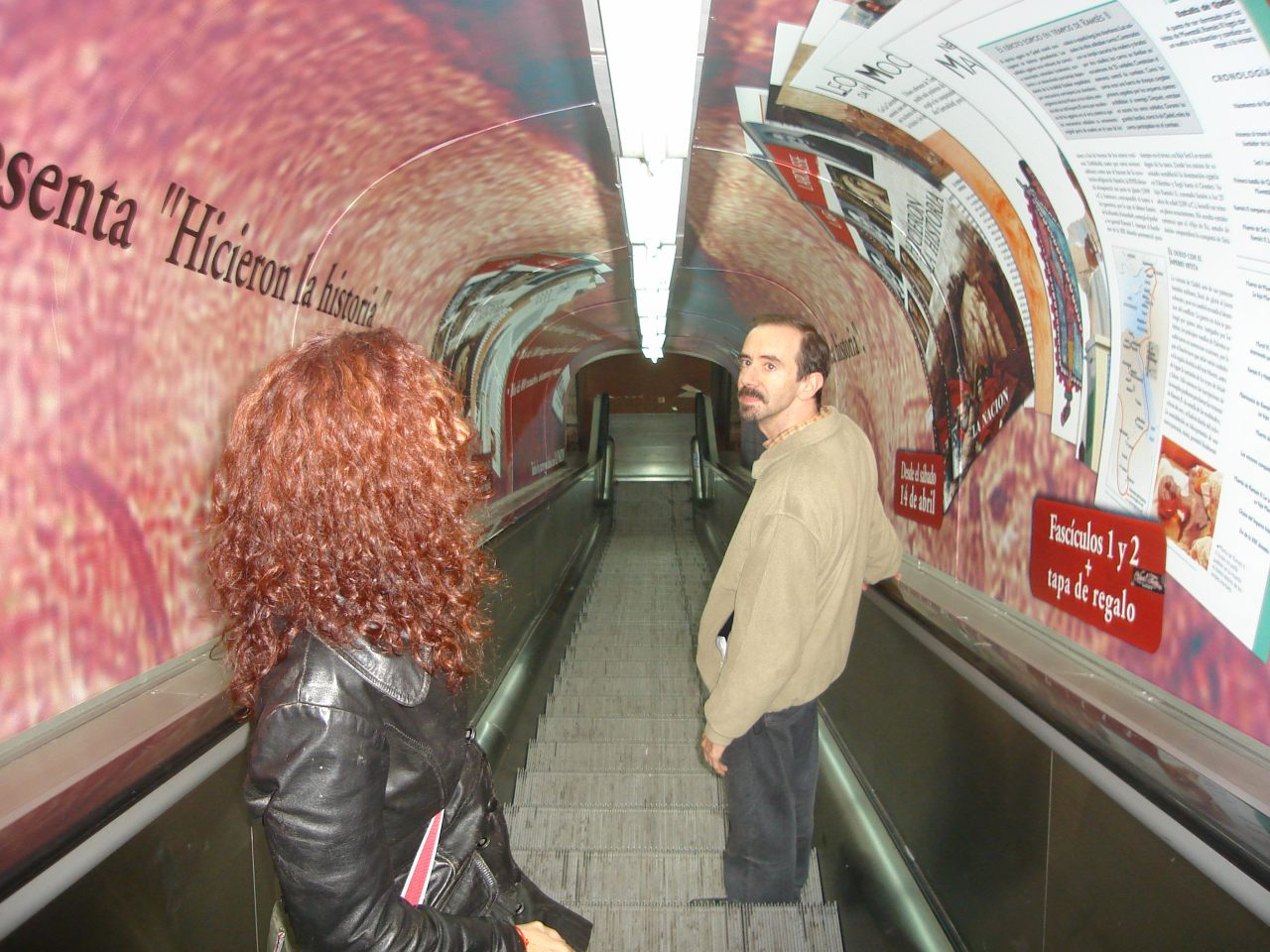

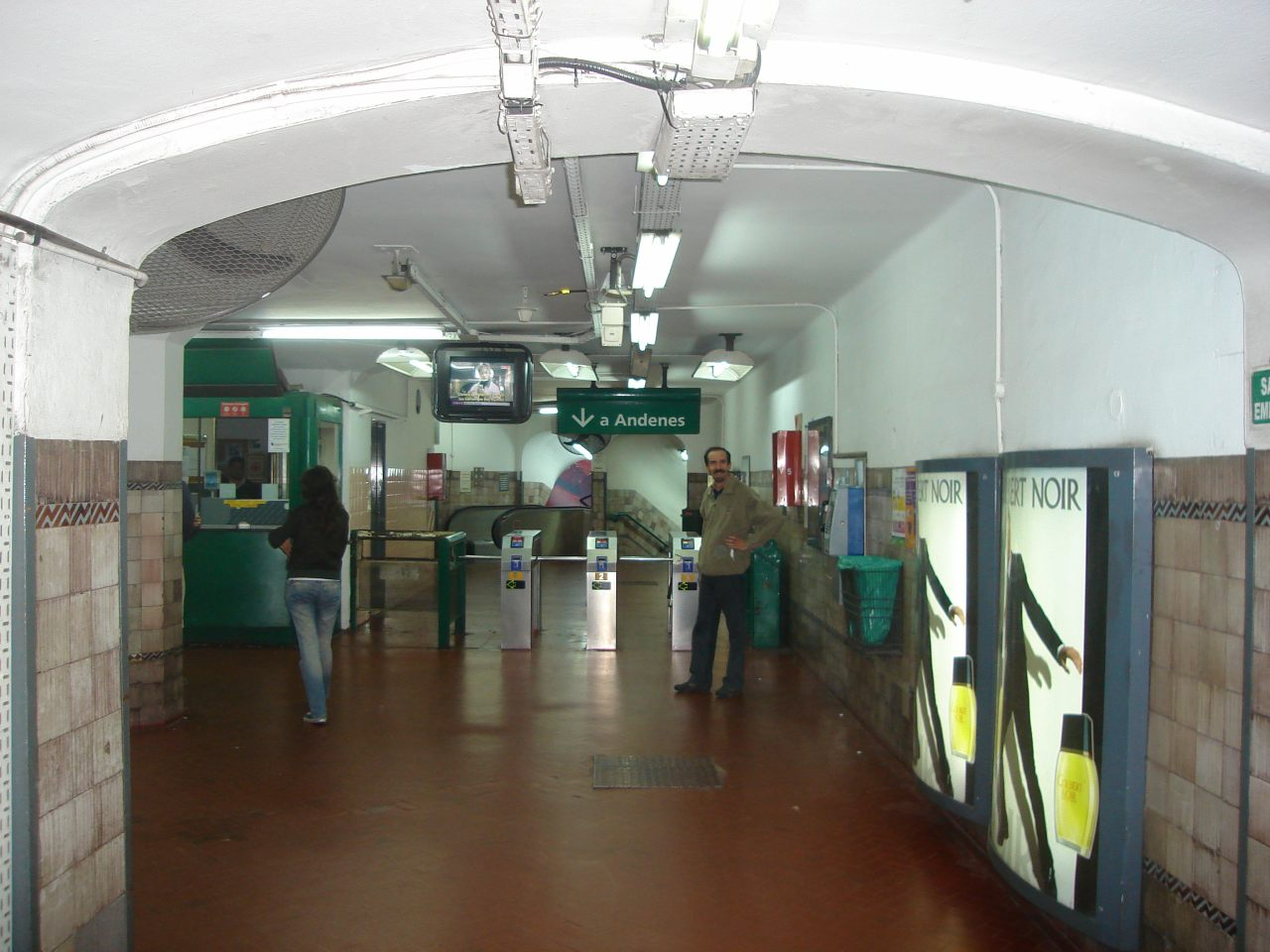

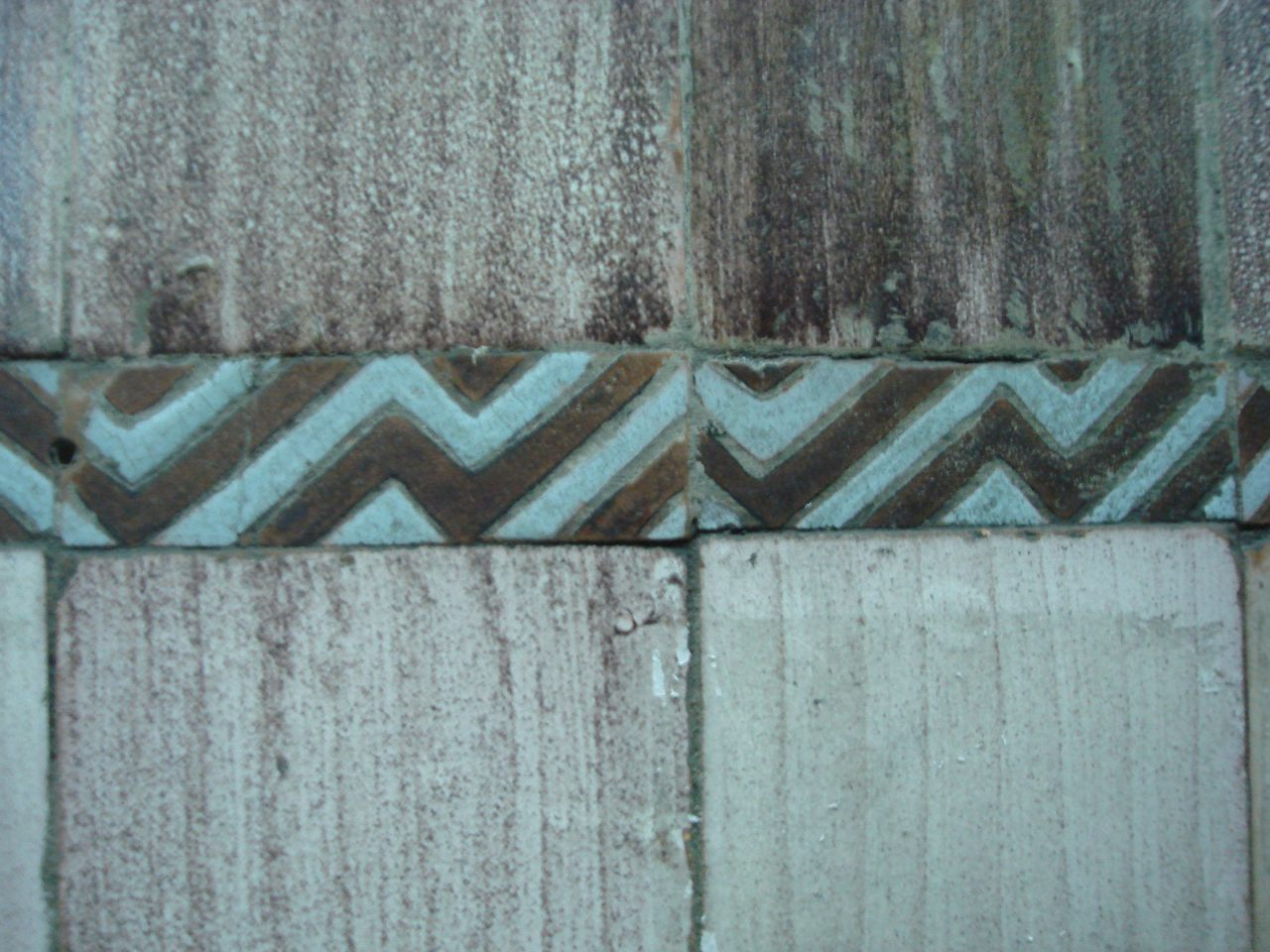

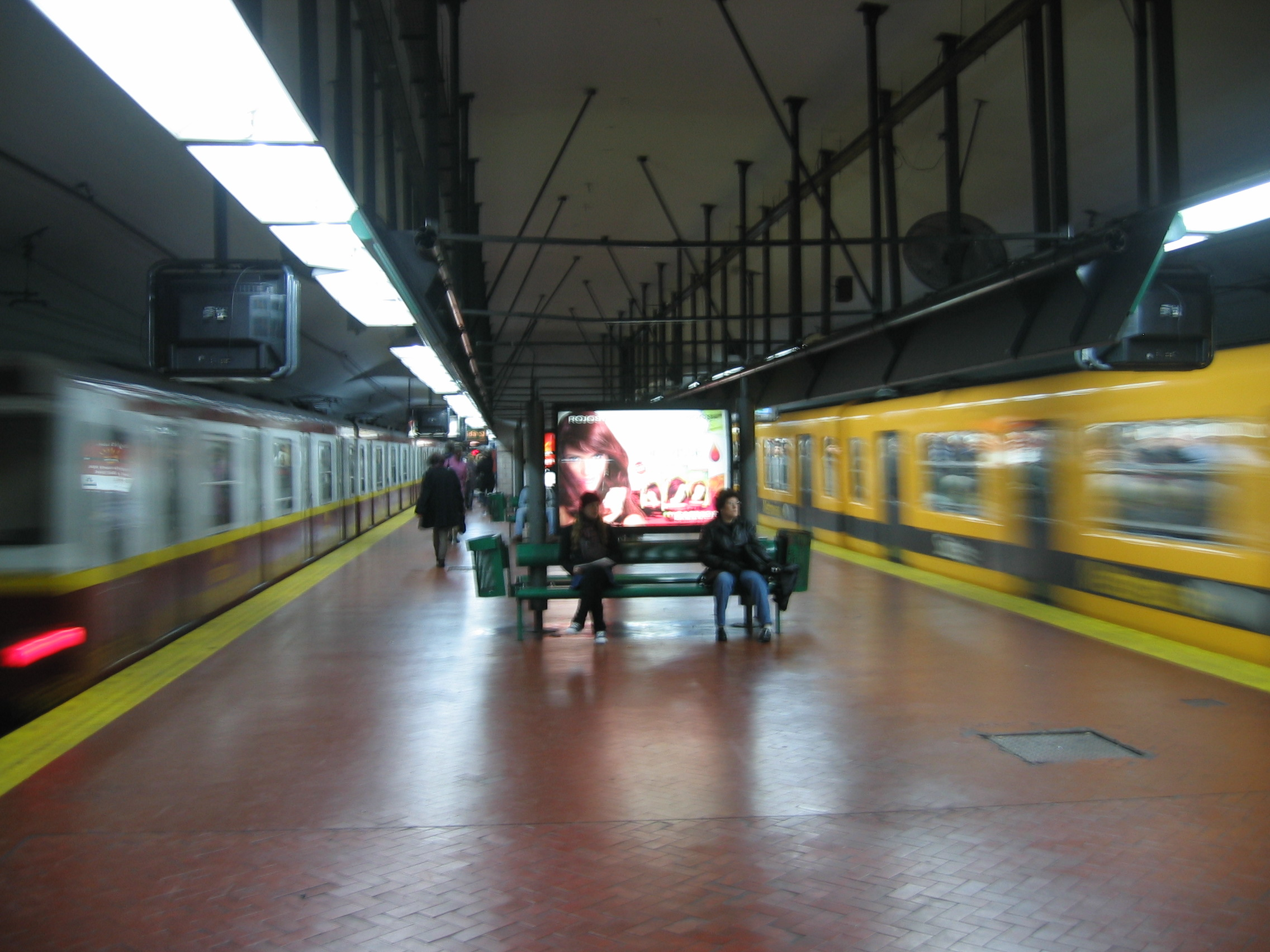

== Nearby ==
- Santa Fe Avenue
