= Line H (Buenos Aires Underground) =

Rapid transit line of Buenos Aires

Line H

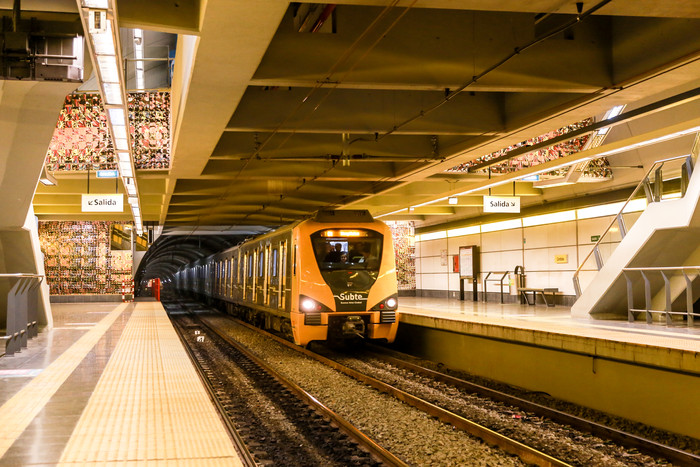
- 300 series train at Córdoba station

Overview
- Termini: Facultad de Derecho; Hospitales
- Stations: 12

Service
- Type: Rapid transit
- System: Buenos Aires Underground
- Operator(s): Emova
- Rolling stock: 300 series
- Daily ridership: 60,547 (2024)

History
- Opened: 18 October 2007; 18 years ago
- Last extension: 2018

Technical
- Line length: 8.8 km (5.5 mi)
- Character: Underground
- Track gauge: 1,435 mm (4 ft 8 1/2 in)
- Electrification: Overhead line, 1,500 V DC

Line H is a line of the Buenos Aires Underground. The first phase, between Plaza Once and Caseros, which opened on 18 October 2007, currently stretches over 8.8 km between Hospitales and Facultad de Derecho stations. It is the first entirely new line built in Buenos Aires since the opening of Line E on 20 June 1944.

Line H map

According to projections, the line will stretch a total of about 11.85 km and will run from between Retiro to Sáenz once the remaining sections are constructed. It connects the southern part of the city with the north, improving traffic flow to the centre of the city. It is also designed to serve as a transversal line and provide cross-connections across all radial lines, mainly under the axis of Jujuy and Pueyrredón avenues.

== Rolling stock ==
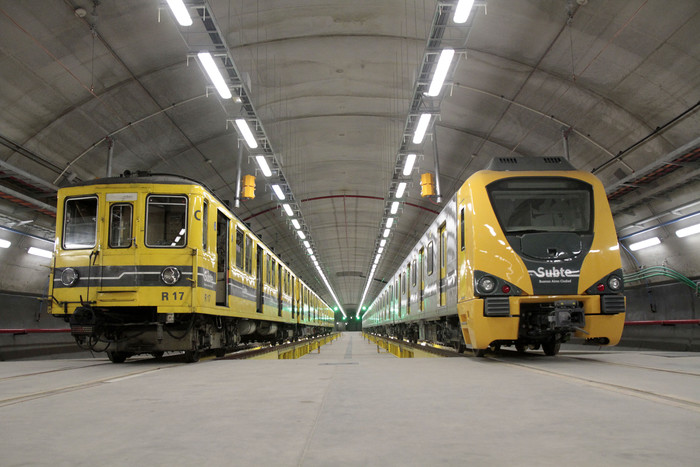
The 300 Series (right) replaced the temporary Siemens-Schuckert Orenstein & Koppel stock (left).

During its early years, Line H was served by a temporary fleet of refurbished and original vintage Siemens-Schuckert Orenstein & Koppel train sets originally introduced on line C, with electric current supplied by overhead lines. The cars featured 42 seats and 4 doors per side.

As the line was extended and passenger numbers increased, the rolling stock was replaced by new Alsom 300 Series units ordered from that company in 2012 in order to make up the entirety of the Line's rolling stock. The first 6 of the 120 new Alstom cars arrived In August 2015, with the remainder phased-in as the line has been extended.

== Further expansion ==
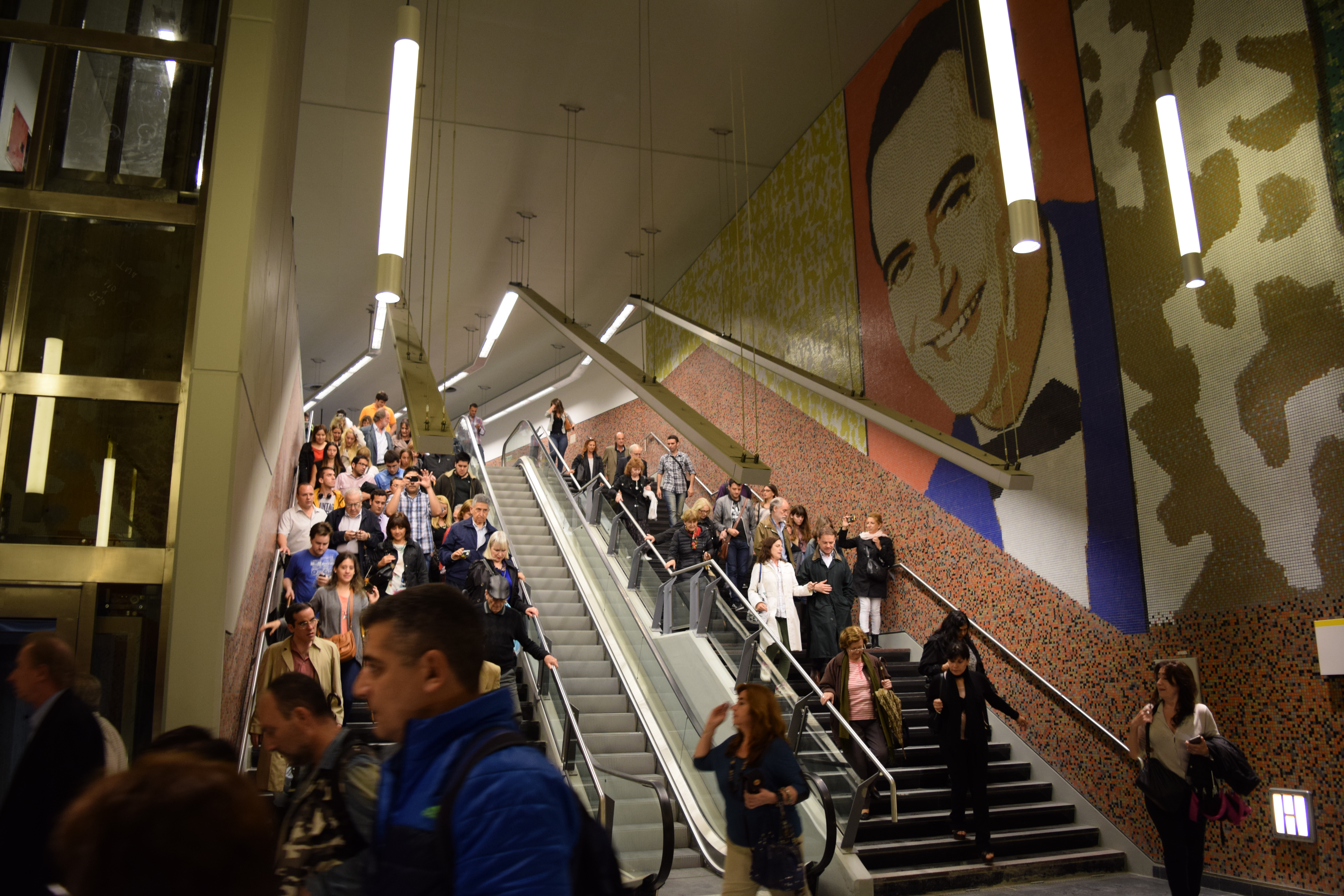
Visitors at Las Heras station before its inauguration.

An initial extension to Corrientes station was inaugurated on Monday 6 December 2010. The Córdoba and Las Heras stations opened in December 2015 with Santa Fe station (which links Line H to Line D) opening in April 2016. Alstom Metropolis rolling stock is now being used on the line.

The Facultad de Derecho station (located at the University of Buenos Aires Faculty of Law) was originally intended to be located across the road next to Plaza Francia, however concerns that it would damage the prestigious Recoleta Cemetery necessitated revisions to these plans and therefore delayed construction of the station, which eventually opened in May 2018. While the plans for the extension exist, the extension to Retiro is not under construction.

== Chronology ==
Date	Text
2007-10-18	Line H was inaugurated between Once and Caseros.
2010-12-06	The line is extended northbound from Once to Corrientes.
2011-10-04	Parque Patricios station opened.
2012-01	Works in the extension towards Plaza Francia (North) and Nueva Pompeya (South) began.
2013-05-27	Hospitales station opened.
2015-12-18	Las Heras and Cordoba stations opened.
2016-07-12	Santa Fe station opened.
2018-05-17	Facultad de Derecho station opened.

== Gallery ==
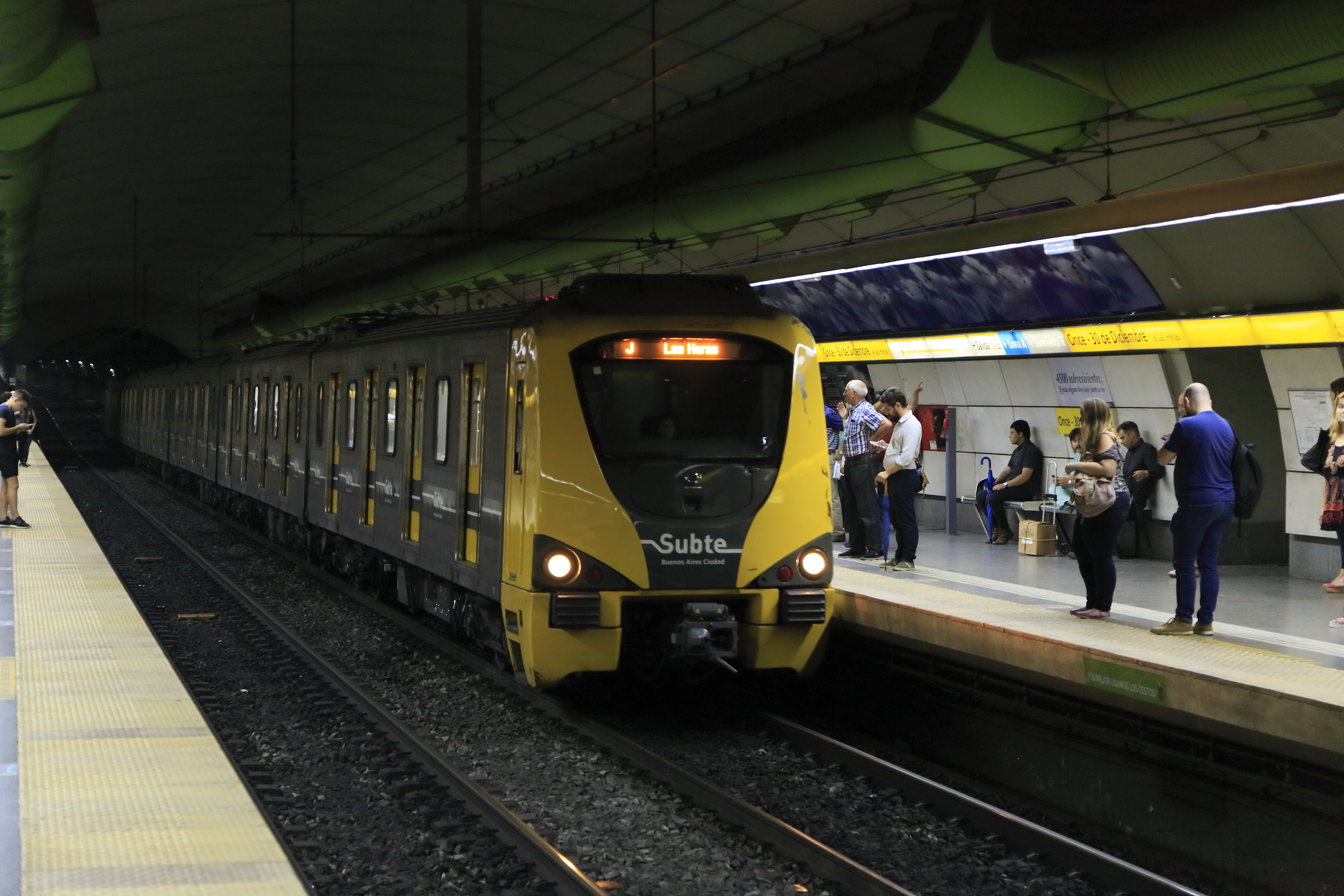

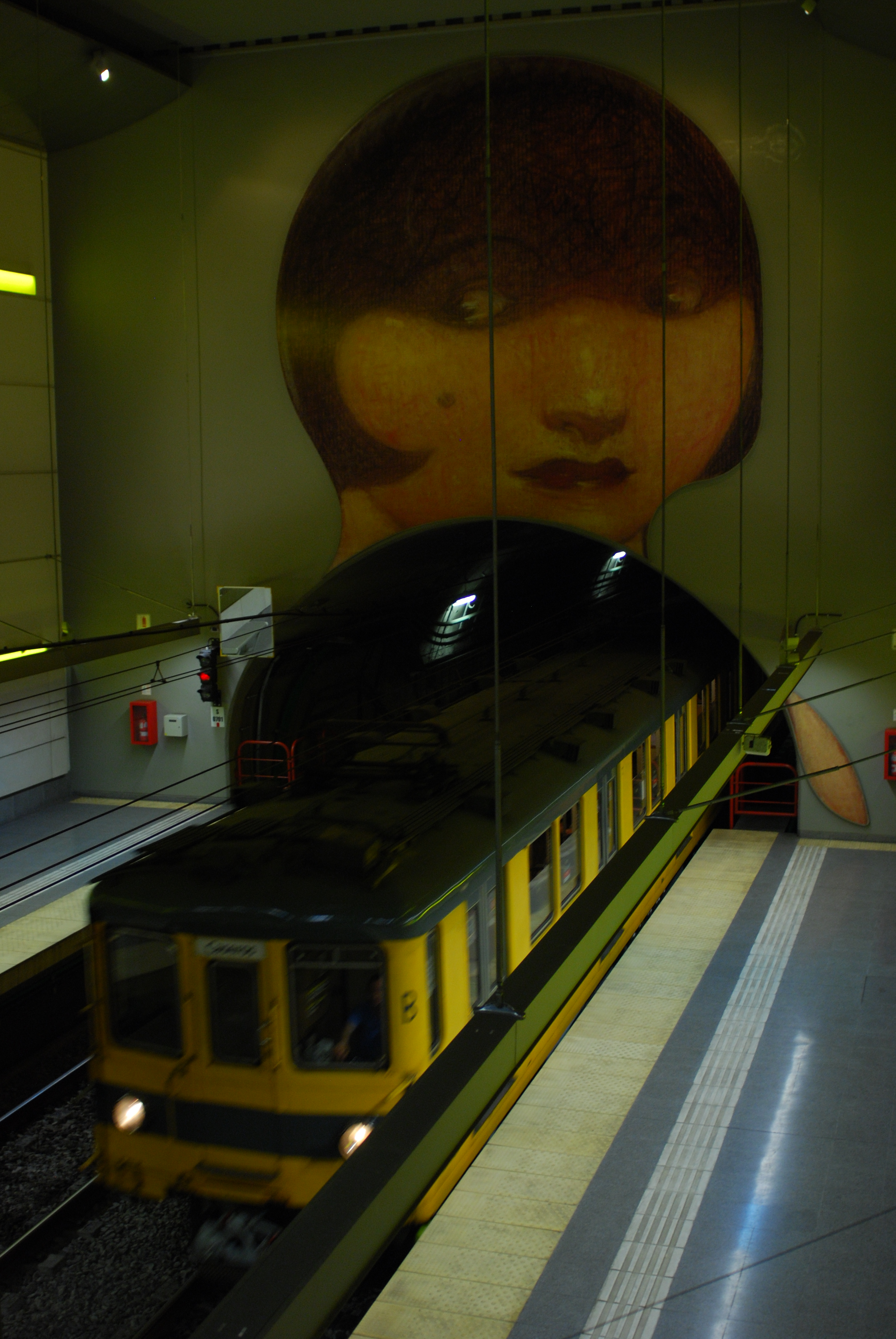

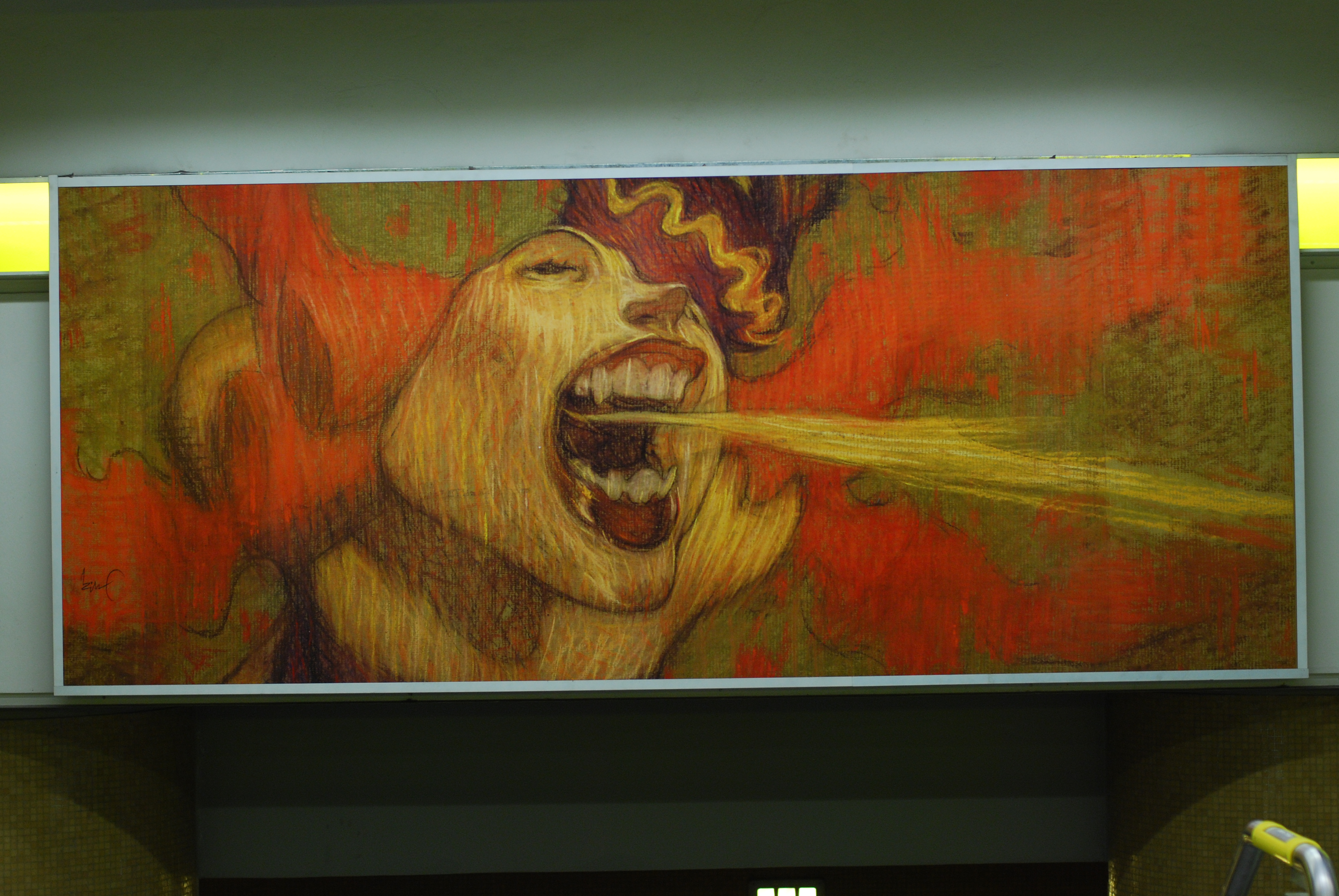

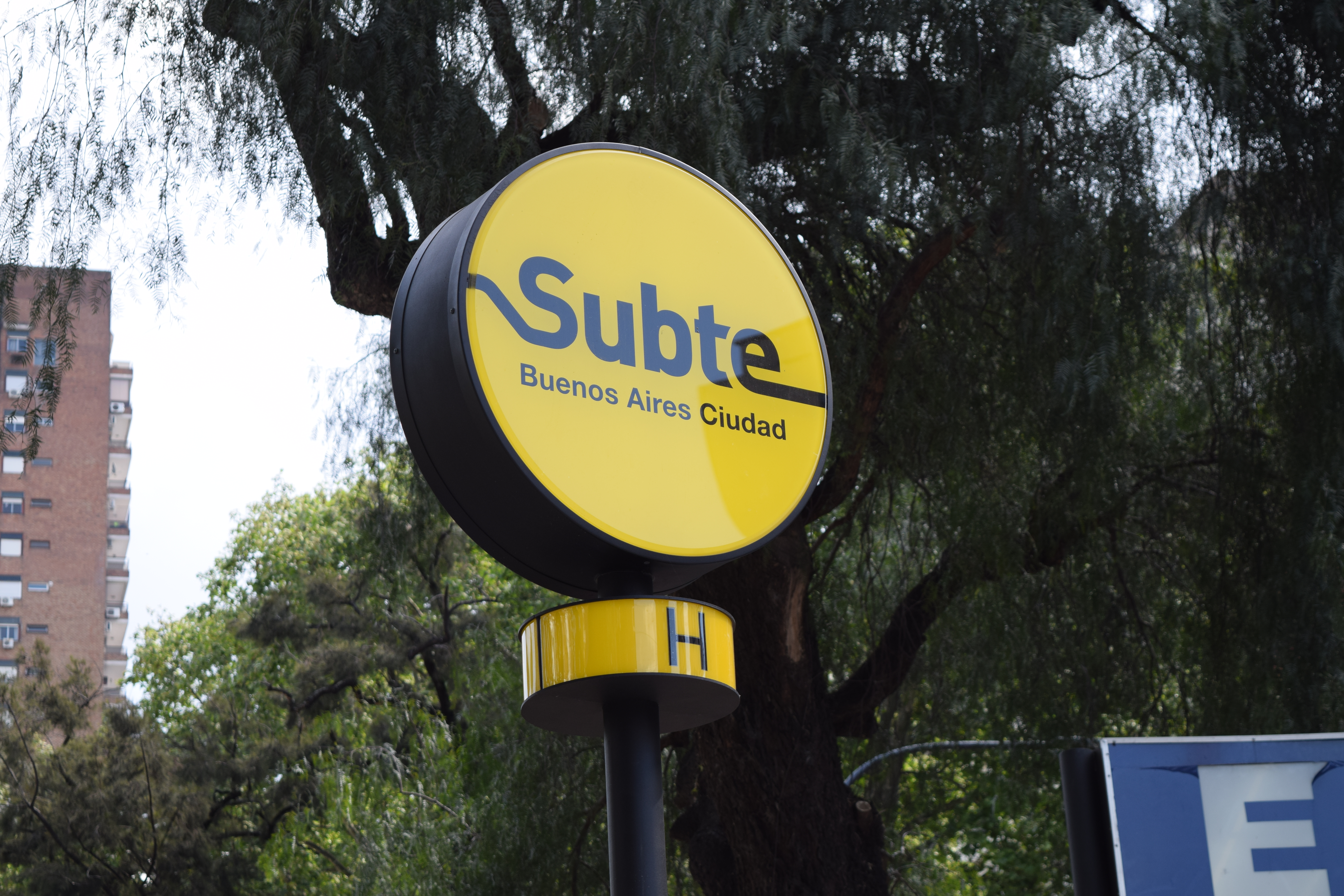

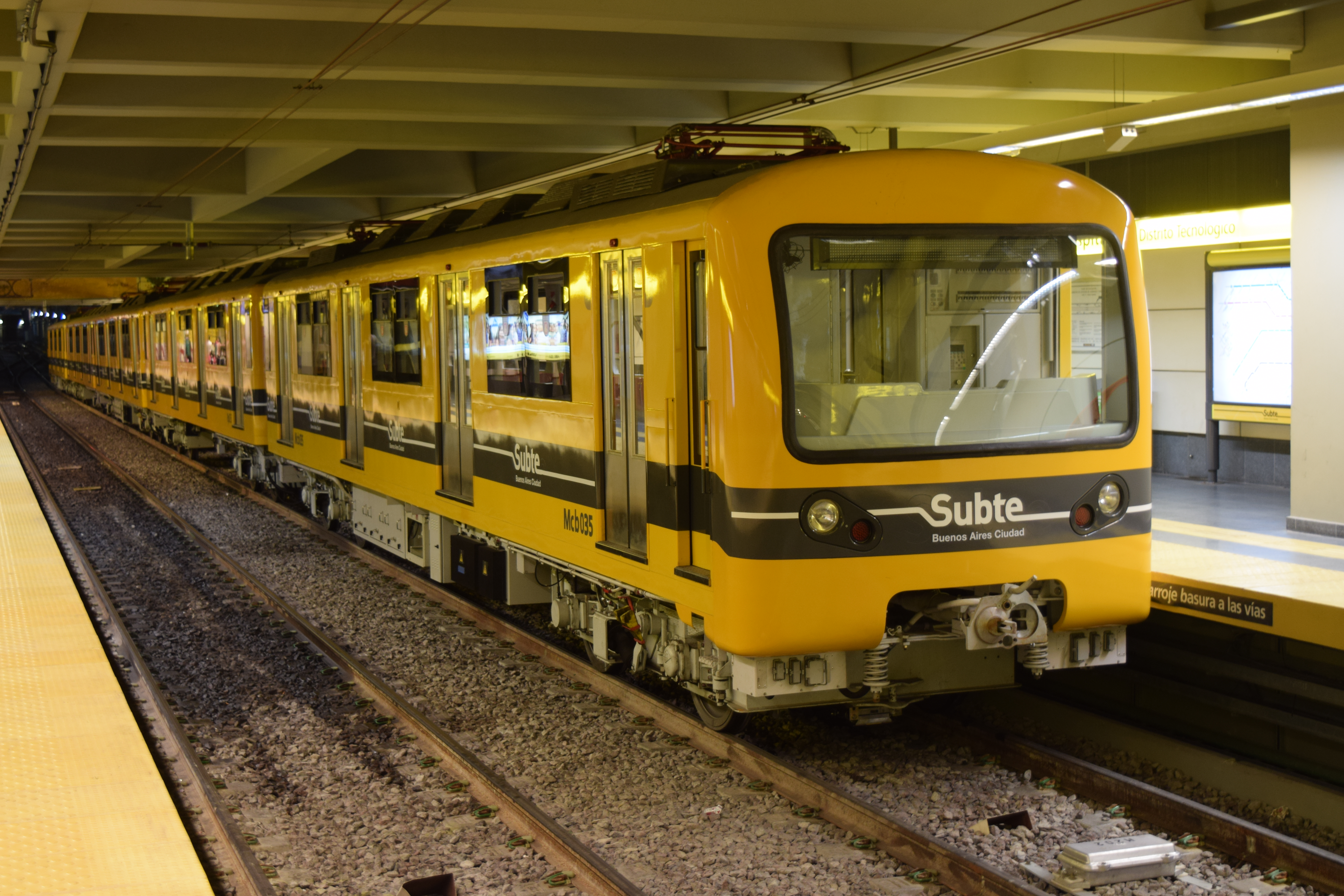
