= Las Heras (Buenos Aires Underground) =

Buenos Aires Underground station

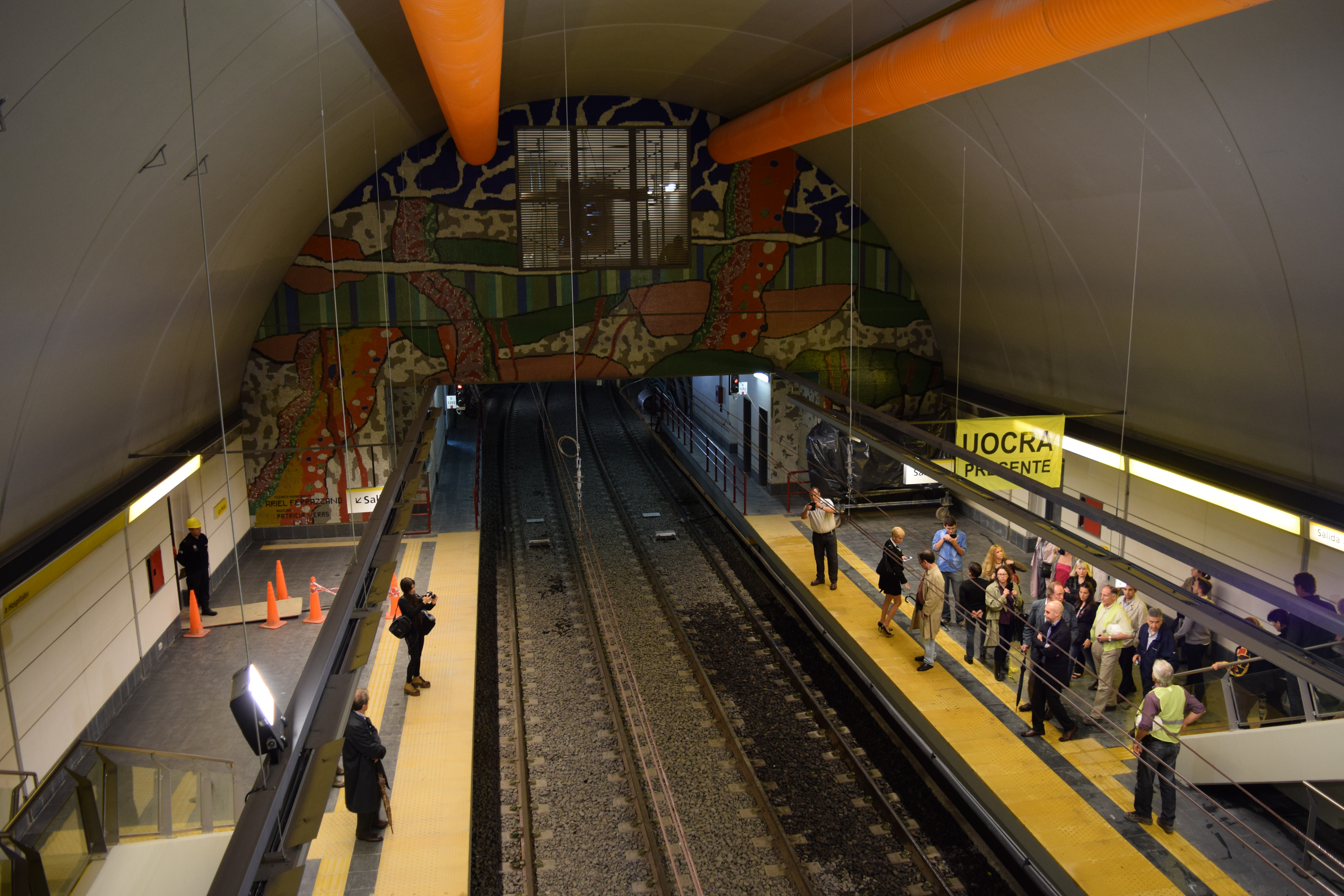

General information
- Location: Pueyrredón and Las Heras
- Coordinates: 34.5874°S 58.3972°W
- Platforms: Side platforms

History
- Opened: 2015

Services
Preceding station	Buenos Aires Underground	Following station
Facultad de Derecho Terminus	Line H	Santa Fe towards Hospitales
Location

Las Heras Station is a station on Line H of the Buenos Aires Underground, opened in 2015. It is located near the University of Buenos Aires faculty of Engineering and the Recoleta Cemetery. The station was opened on 18 December 2015 as the northern terminus of the extension of the line from Corrientes. On 17 May 2018 the line was extended to Facultad de Derecho.

== Gallery ==
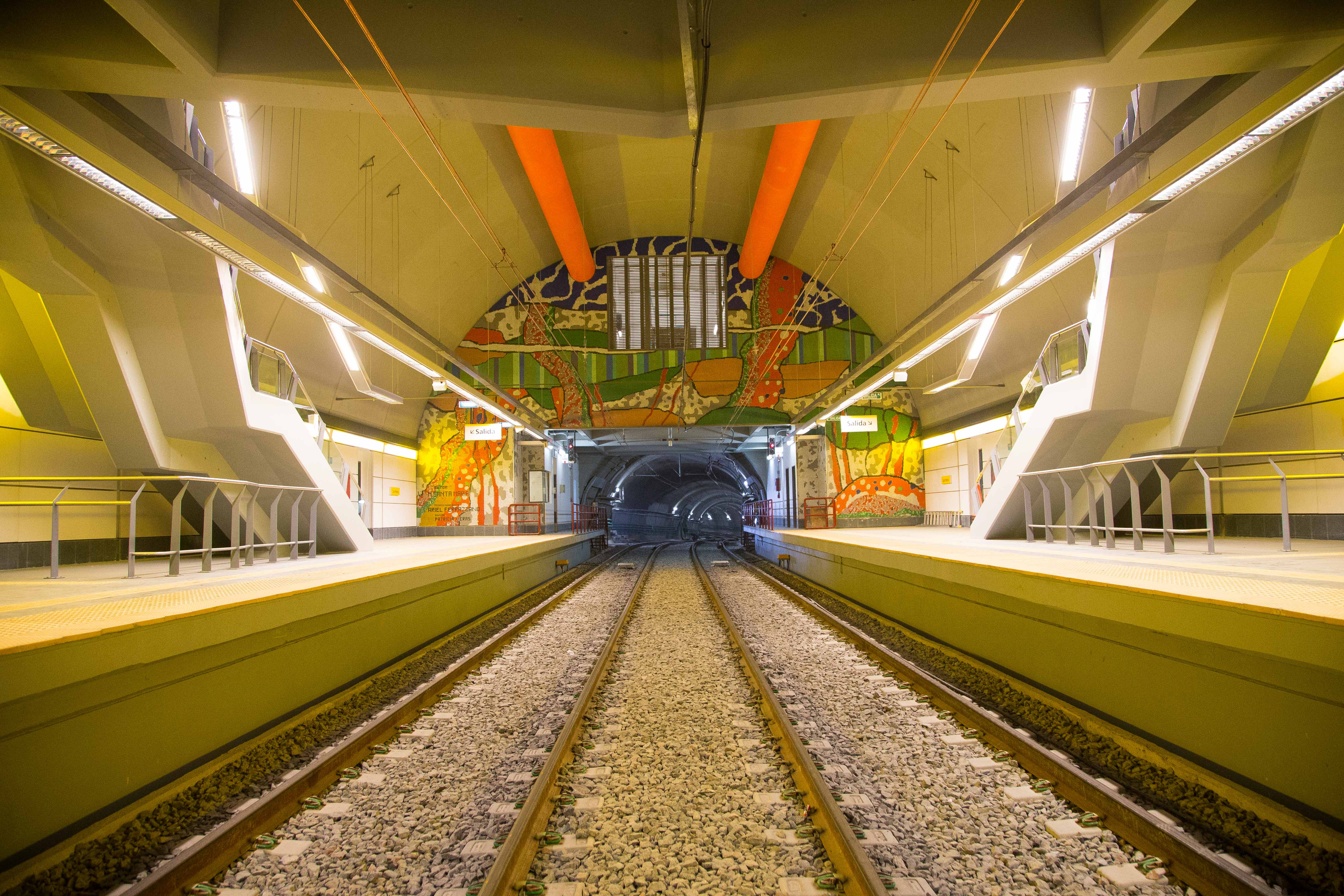

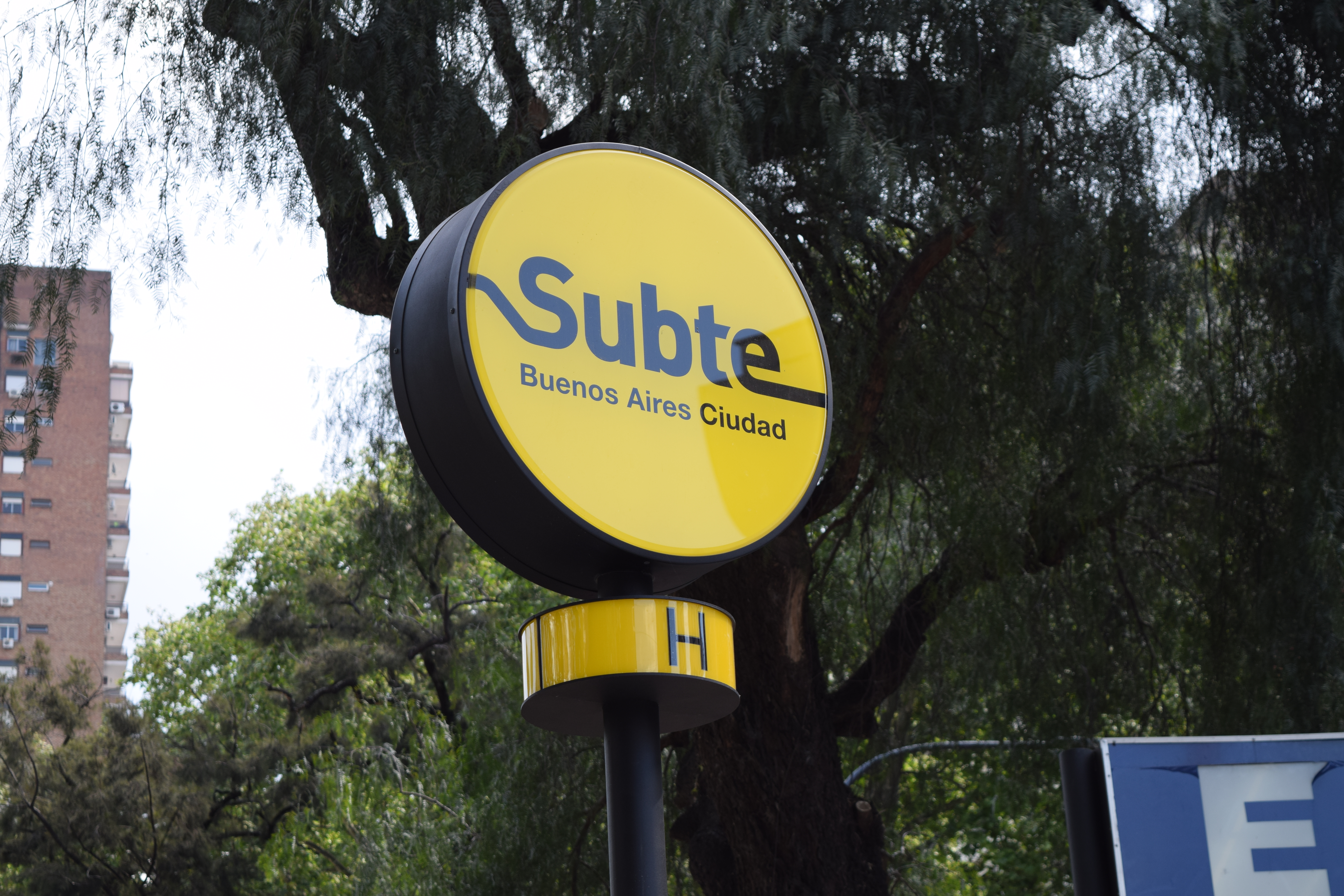

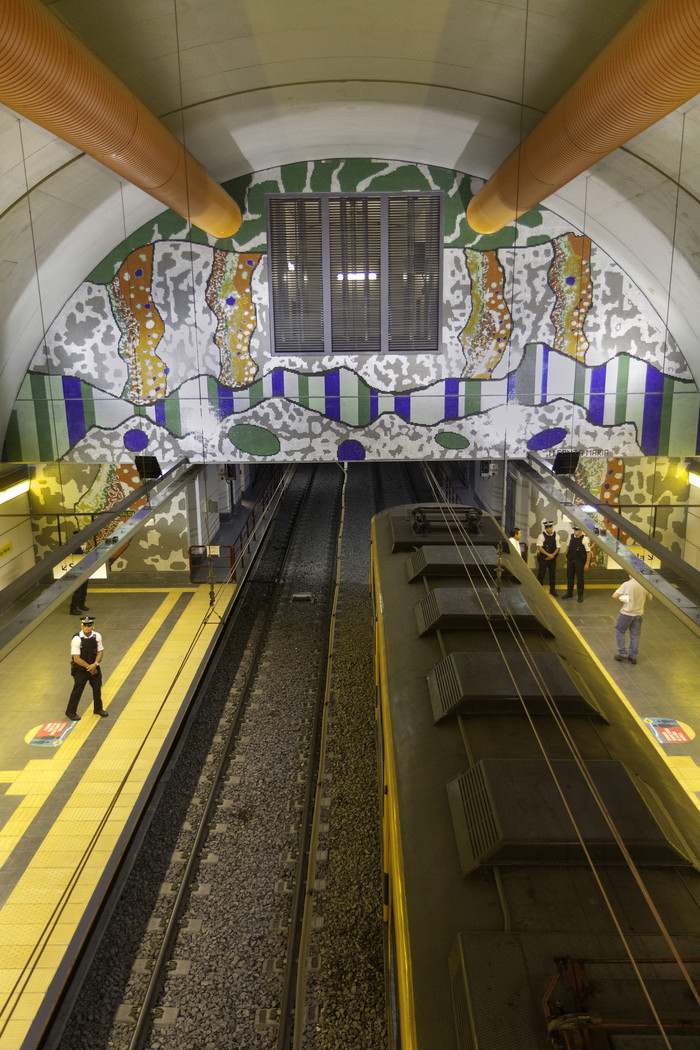

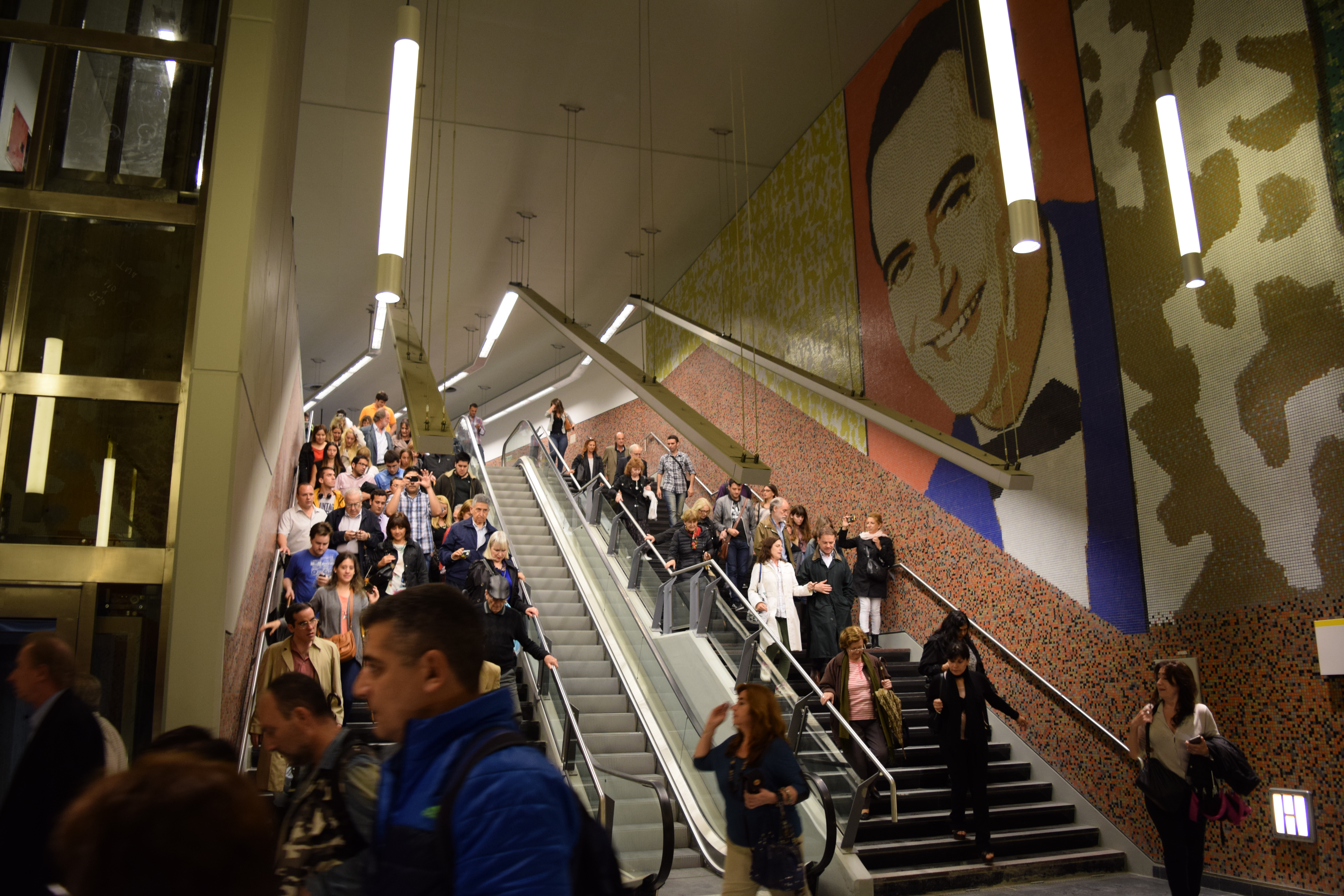

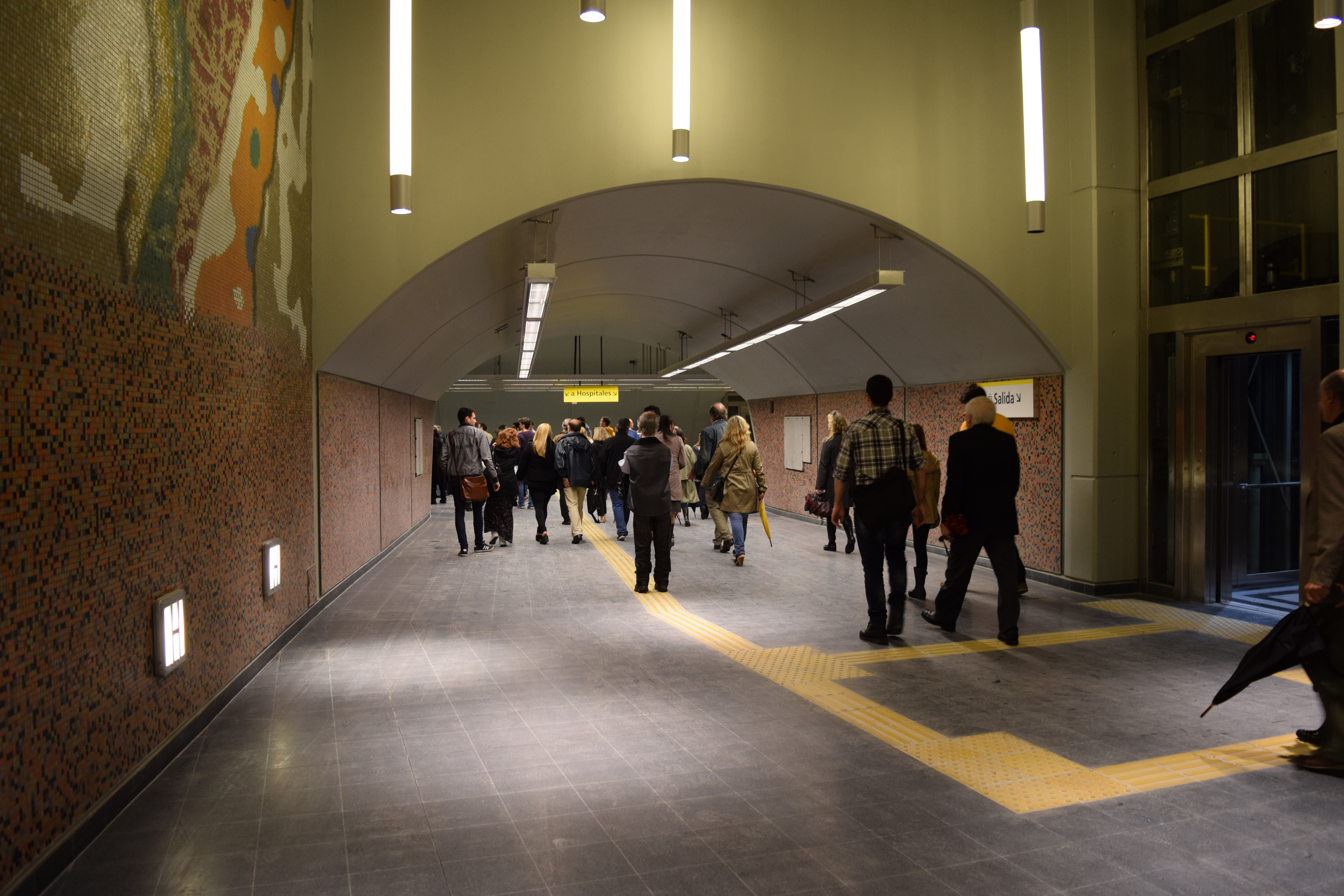

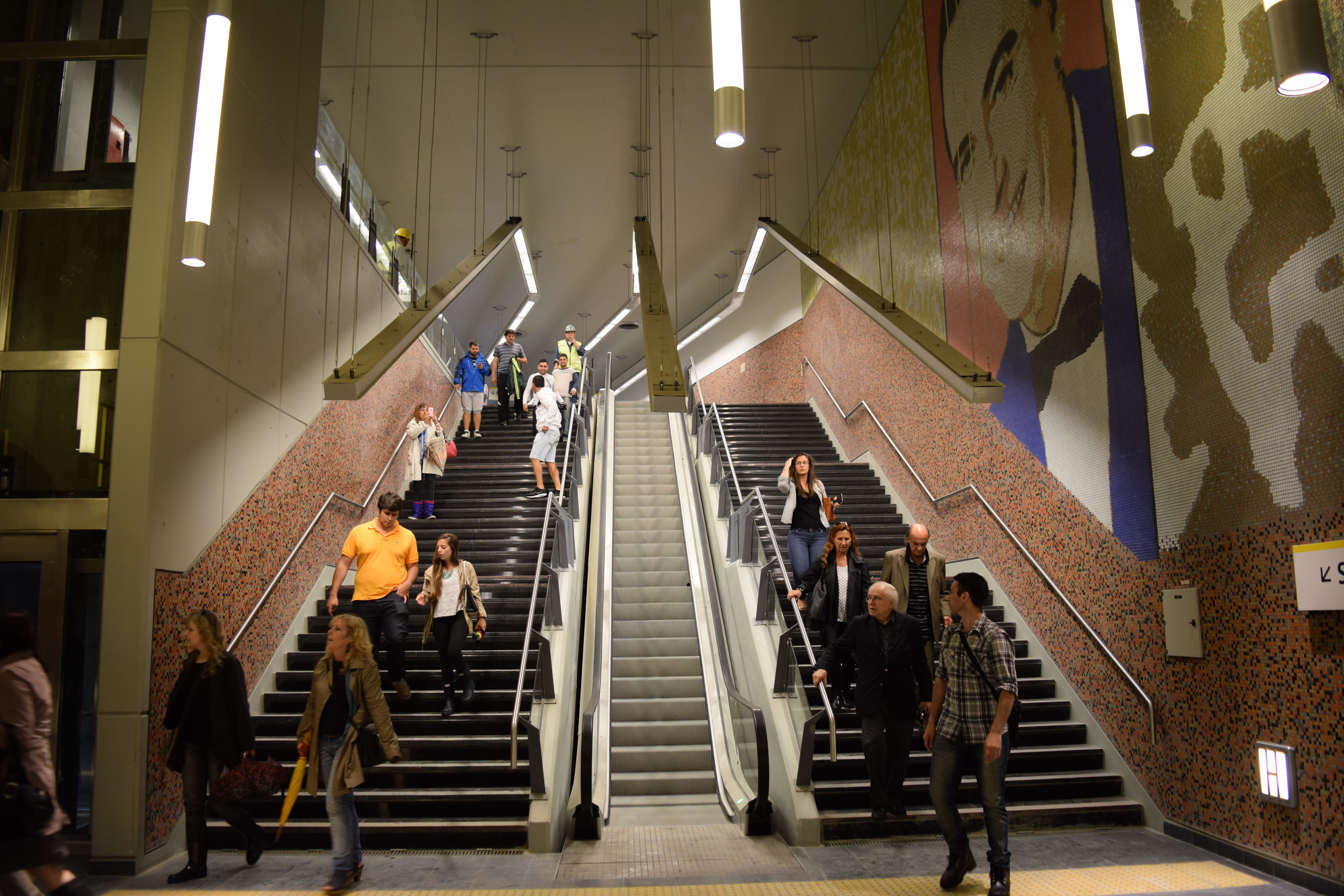
