= Facultad de Derecho (Buenos Aires Underground) =

Buenos Aires Underground station

Facultad de Derecho-Julieta Lanteri
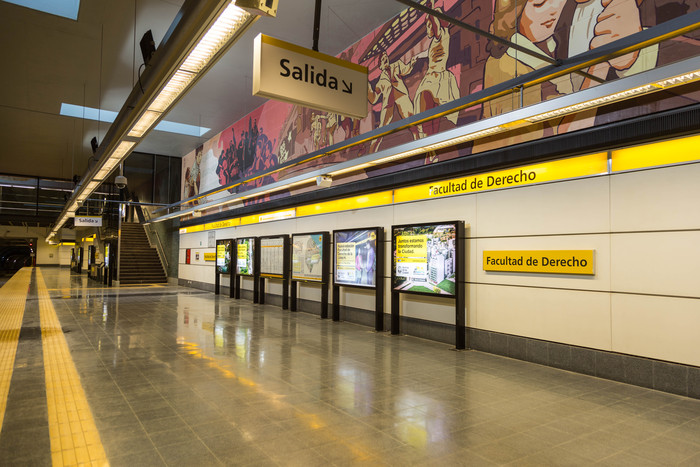
- Station platform in 2018.

General information
- Location: Pueyrredón and Figueroa Alcorta
- Platforms: Side platforms
- Connections: Mitre Line, Belgrano Norte Line and San Martín Line (planned)

History
- Opened: 17 May 2018

Services
Preceding station	Buenos Aires Underground	Following station
Terminus	Line H	Las Heras towards Hospitales
Location

Facultad de Derecho-Julieta Lanteri Station is a station on Line H of the Buenos Aires Underground which opened on 17 May 2018 as a one-station extension from Las Heras. It currently serves as the northern terminus of the line until it is extended to Retiro. It is located next to the University of Buenos Aires Faculty of Law and the City's Exhibition and Conventions Centre and it is near the Recoleta Cemetery and Fine arts museum.

The station was previously going to be located closer to the cemetery, however works were canceled there due to concerns that it would affect the natural beauty and architecture of the surrounding area. It was then moved further north to its present location.

A new railway station (Retiro Norte) is also planned at the site of the underground station, which would create connections with the Mitre Line, San Martín Line and Belgrano Norte Line commuter rail services.

In 2019, the station was renamed Facultad de Derecho-Julieta Lanteri after a public vote held by the city's government.
