= Hospitales (Buenos Aires Underground) =

Buenos Aires Underground station

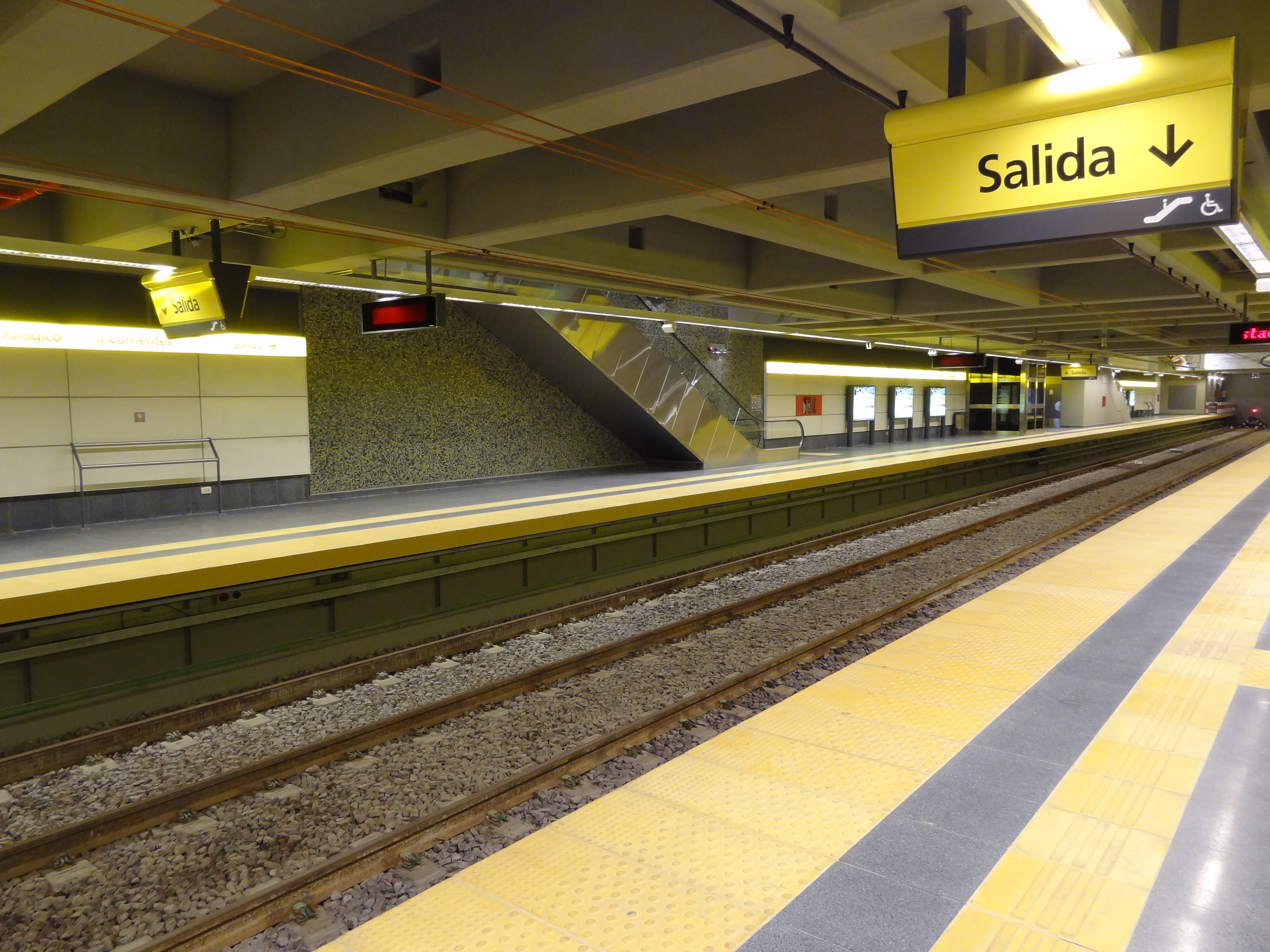

General information
- Location: Almafuerte 300
- Coordinates: 34°38′29″S 58°24′45″W
- Platforms: Side platforms

History
- Opened: 27 May 2013

Services
Preceding station	Buenos Aires Underground	Following station
Parque Patricios towards Facultad de Derecho	Line H	Terminus
Location

Hospitales Station is a station and terminus on Line H of the Buenos Aires Underground. Here passengers may transfer to Metrobus Sur. It was opened on 27 May 2013 as a one-station extension from Parque Patricios. It is currently serving as the southern terminus of the line, until it is extended to Sáenz.
