= Buenos Aires Underground rolling stock =

Buenos Aires metro system fleet

The Buenos Aires Underground has one of the most diverse metro fleets in the world, and has had some of the oldest models in operation on any network. The network began with a relatively standardised fleet, but throughout its over 100-year-long history, it has seen numerous purchases which have created cases where some lines operate numerous models. Recently there have been increased efforts to modernise and standardise the fleets, with large purchases from China CNR Corporation and Alstom.

== History ==
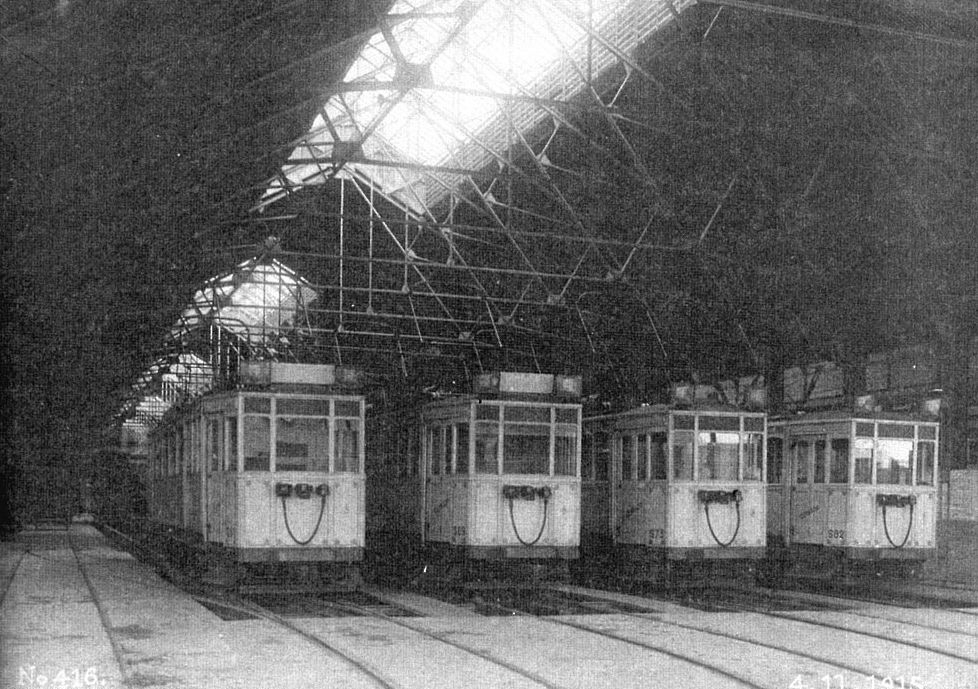
La Brugeoise cars inside the Polvorín Workshop in 1913.

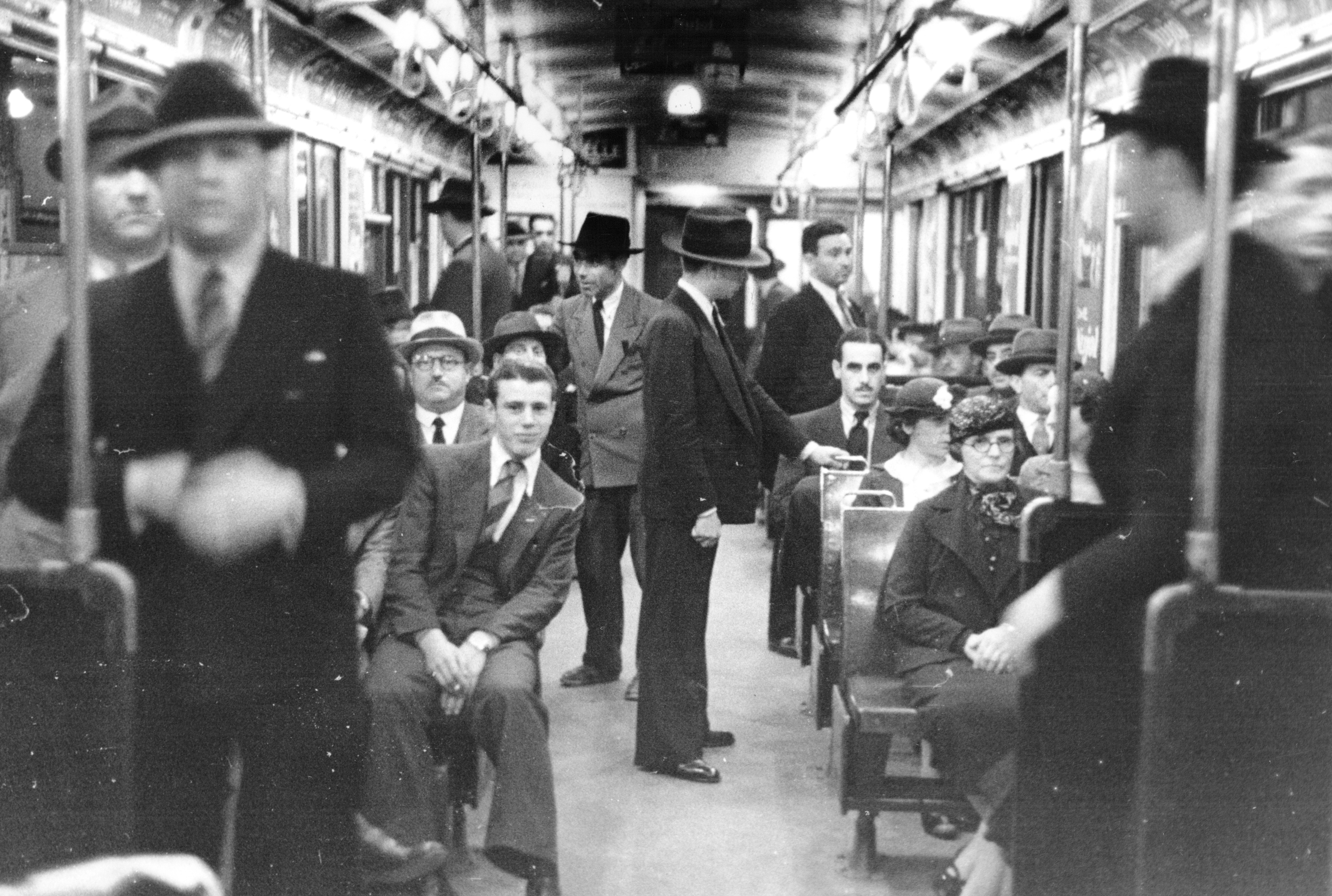
Interior of a Metropolitan-Cammell car on Line B.

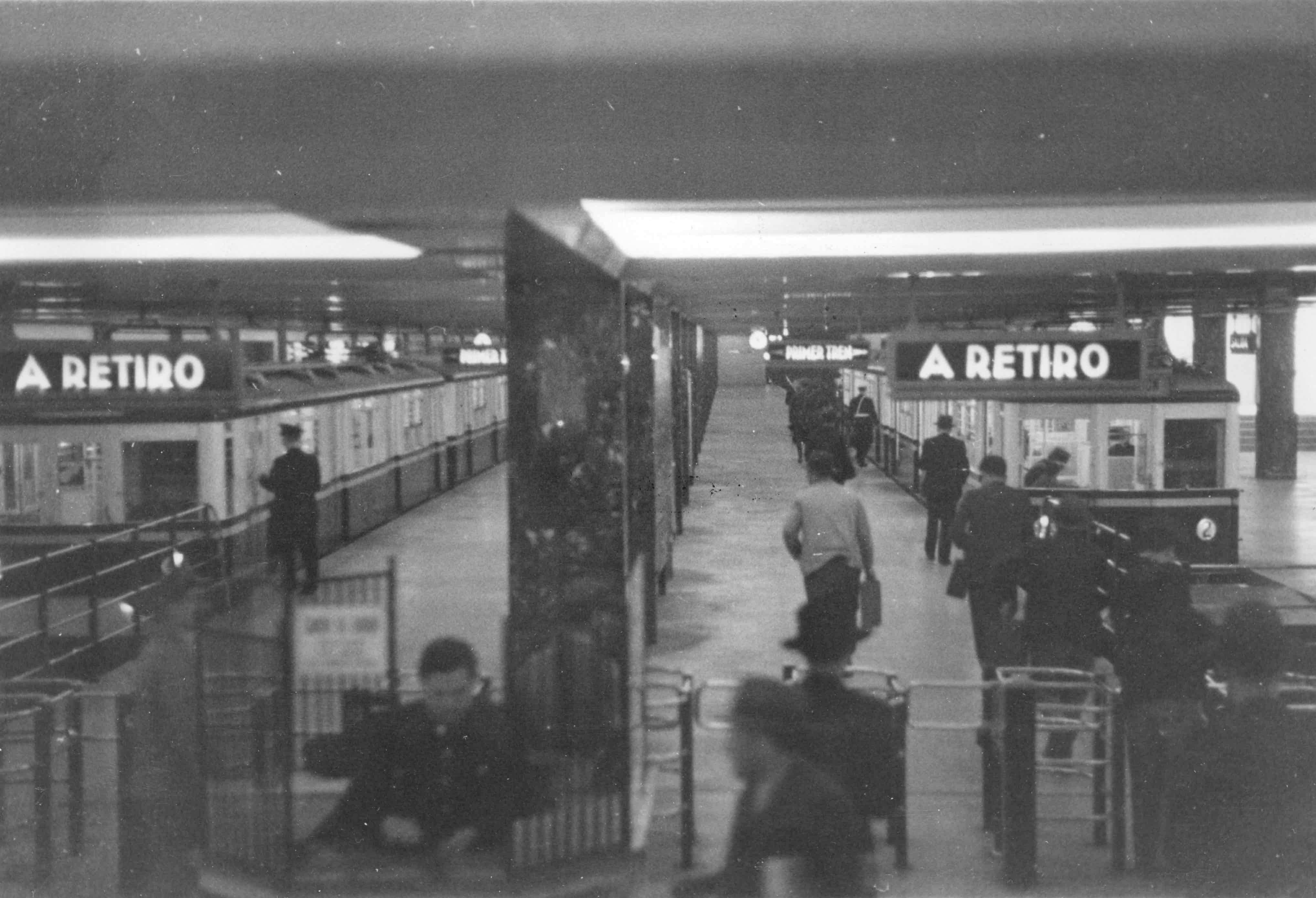
Siemens-Schuckert Orenstein & Koppel rolling stock at Constitución station on Line C.

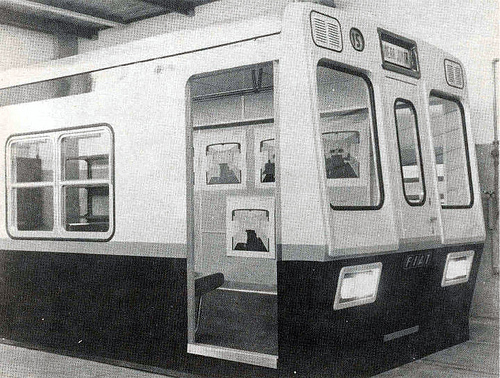
Fiat-Materfer cars were the first attempt at standardisation.

Before the nationalisation of the railways and the formation of Subterráneos de Buenos Aires, the original lines of Buenos Aires Underground were built by three private companies, and each bought different rolling stock for their lines.

Line A was inaugurated in 1913 by the Anglo-Argentine Tramways Company (AATC)—then owned by the Belgian company Sofina—who owned the vast majority of the city's tramways at that point. Two companies competed to provide the rolling stock of the line: the Belgian La Brugeoise et Nivelles and British United Electric Car Company, with the Belgian company ultimately winning the contract. However 4 UEC Preston cars had been sent to the country and these more extravagant cars were kept in service on the line until the 1970s and were often used on special occasions. The Brugeoise cars made up the entirety of the rolling stock of the line until 2013, retiring just before their 100-year anniversary.

The Argentine company Lacroze Hermanos built Line B, originally designed to be an underground continuation of the Buenos Aires Central Tramway (today the Urquiza Line). The line has historically been significantly different from the others in terms of rolling stock since it uses third rail electrification instead of overhead lines and as such, it has been the most troublesome to standardise and has often had the most diverse rolling stock, with four different models circulating on its tracks at one point. Originally served by Metropolitan-Cammell cars from its opening in 1930, these were later reinforced by cars from the Osgood Bradley Car Company in the 1950s. Later on, two attempts were made by the state-owned Fabricaciones Militares to replace the rolling stock of the line, however these were never produced in enough numbers to replace all the cars on the line. It was only in 1996 that the line was standardised again when cars were bought second-hand from the Tokyo Metro Marunouchi Line in order to replace all the cars. This was also the first time in the history of the network that cars were bought second-hand.

Lines C, D and E were all built by the Hispanic-Argentine Company for Public Works and Finances (CHADOPyF) in the 1930s and 1940s and were thus the most straightforward. All the lines used German Siemens-Schuckert Orenstein & Koppel rolling stock from their inaugurations, though during the 1960s Spanish-built CAF-General Electrica Española were added to the lines. The CAF-GEE cars were designed to be highly compatible with the Siemens-Schuckert Orenstein & Koppel cars in order to reduce maintenance costs. It was only in the 1980s that the rolling stock started to diversify on these lines when Fiat-Materfer cars began to be introduced in order to standardise all the lines of the network (with the exception of Line B) using this rolling stock, however not enough of these were built to replace the Brugeoise, CAF and Siemens cars, so the ended up being spread thinly and switched between lines as temporary stock since their introduction.

The standardisation across lines was further reduced following privatisation in the 1990s when more attempts were made to replace the ageing Brugeoise and Siemens stocks with second hand purchases from Japan and the incorporation of the new Alstom Metropolis 100 Series rolling stock, none of which were purchased in enough numbers to make up the entirety of a line, let alone multiple lines on the network. Only in 2010s were there moves towards re-standardising and modernising the fleet whilst retiring the ageing trains which had served since the opening of each respective line. Numerous purchases of new rolling stock have been made, along with the purchase of second hand rolling stock which the City Government claims is a necessity given the need to quickly incorporate trains in lines with rolling stock deficits.

=== Historical fleet ===
Model	Photo	Years active	Country	Purchased New	Cars built/purchased	Former Lines
La Brugeoise		1913–2013	(Belgium)	Yes	125	Line A (Buenos Aires Underground) PreMetro E2 (Buenos Aires)
UEC Preston		1913–1977	(United Kingdom)	Yes	4	Line A (Buenos Aires Underground)
Metropolitan Cammell		1930–1996	(United Kingdom)	Yes	56	Line B (Buenos Aires Underground)
Osgood-Bradley		1931–1996	(United States)	Yes	20	Line B (Buenos Aires Underground)
Siemens-Schuckert Orenstein & Koppel		1934–2016	(Germany) (Argentina)	Yes	13 + 3 scrapped during construction	Line C (Buenos Aires Underground) Line D (Buenos Aires Underground) Line E (Buenos Aires Underground) Line H (Buenos Aires Underground)
Fabricaciones Militares	http://busarg.com.ar/fotogaleria/albums/userpics/35995.jpg	1965–1996	(Argentina)	Yes	14	Line B (Buenos Aires Underground)
Siemens-Fabricaciones Militares		1977–1996	(Argentina)	Yes	18	Line B (Buenos Aires Underground)
Siemens-Emepa-Alstom		2010–2017	(Argentina) (Germany)	Refurbished	50	Line H (Buenos Aires Underground) Line A (Buenos Aires Underground)
CAF 5000		2013–2018	(Spain)	No	36	Line B (Buenos Aires Underground)
Nagoya 250/300/1200 Series		1999–2020	(Japan)	No	78	Line D (Buenos Aires Underground) Line C (Buenos Aires Underground)
CAF/General Eléctrica Española		1964–2020	(Spain)	Yes	56	Line D (Buenos Aires Underground) Line E (Buenos Aires Underground)

=== Preservation ===
The original La Brugeoise rolling stock has been maintained, some as exhibits and some being converted to 1500V to run tourist services on the line. In December 2013 a law was passed which meant that the entire La Brugeoise fleet would receive protection status and would thus only be donated to organisations dedicated to their restoration and preservation. The three surviving UEC Preston cars serve on the Buenos Aires Heritage Tramway above-ground in the neighbourhood of Caballito. Two Siemens-Schuckert Orenstein & Koppel also have been donated to the Buenos Aires Heritage Tramway, but the fate of the rest of the fleet is still unclear.

On 1 February 2018, the Buenos Aires Heritage Tramway received a donation from SBASE consisting of a Metropolitan Cammell and a Siemens-Fabricaciones Militares.

== Current fleet ==
Rolling stock of the Buenos Aires Underground as of July 2024 (may not be current for all models).

Model	Photo	Years active	Country	Purchased New	Cars built/purchased	Cars in operation	Former Lines	Current Lines
Fiat-Materfer		1980–present	(Argentina)	Yes	105	20	Line A (Buenos Aires Underground) Line D (Buenos Aires Underground)	Line E (Buenos Aires Underground)
Materfer		1988–present	(Argentina)	Yes	17	13		PreMetro E2 (Buenos Aires)
Mitsubishi Eidan 500 series		1996–present	(Japan)	No	128	96		Line B (Buenos Aires Underground)
Nagoya 5000 Series		2015–present	(Japan)	No	30	30		Line C (Buenos Aires Underground)
100 Series		2001–present	(Brazil) (Argentina)	Yes	96	96	Line D (Buenos Aires Underground)	Line E (Buenos Aires Underground)
200 Series		2013–present	(China)	Yes	150	150		(105) (45)
CAF 6000		2015–present	(Spain)	No	72	72		Line B (Buenos Aires Underground)
300 Series		2016-Present	(Brazil)	Yes	180	162 (being phased-in)		Line H (Buenos Aires Underground) Line D (Buenos Aires Underground)

Green = current, Blue = future, Yellow = being phased-out.

== Lines ==
In the mid-2010s, the Underground was in a transitional period where temporary rolling stock was serving on numerous lines while orders arrived from China and Brazil. After these cars arrived in 2015 and 2016, the network had a far less diverse rolling stock, with Line A being composed entirely of CITIC-CNR trains, while lines D and H were made up entirely of Alstom Metropolis trains. The older Siemens-Schuckert Orenstein & Koppel cars were completely retired from the network, thus reducing the average age of the rolling stock significantly. With this move towards standardisation, some of the newer trains have received series numbers: the original Alstom Metropolis trains on Line D have been dubbed the 100 Series, the CITIC-CNR trains are the 200 Series, while the newer Alstom Metropolis trains for lines H and D are the 300 Series.

Line B are composed of CAF cars purchased from the Madrid Metro while retiring the Eidan 500 cars. Line C is using a variety of Nagoya cars, while Line E is using Fiat-Materfer cars and refurbished Siemens-Schuckert Orenstein & Koppel cars, retiring the CAF/GEE cars. No plans have been made public about the long-term intentions with these lines, though Line C has received a modern communications-based train control system in preparation for newer rolling stock. It has not been stated what rolling stock will be used on Line F, though the usage of platform screen doors on the line will require modern rolling stock and automated trains are being considered.

=== Line A ===
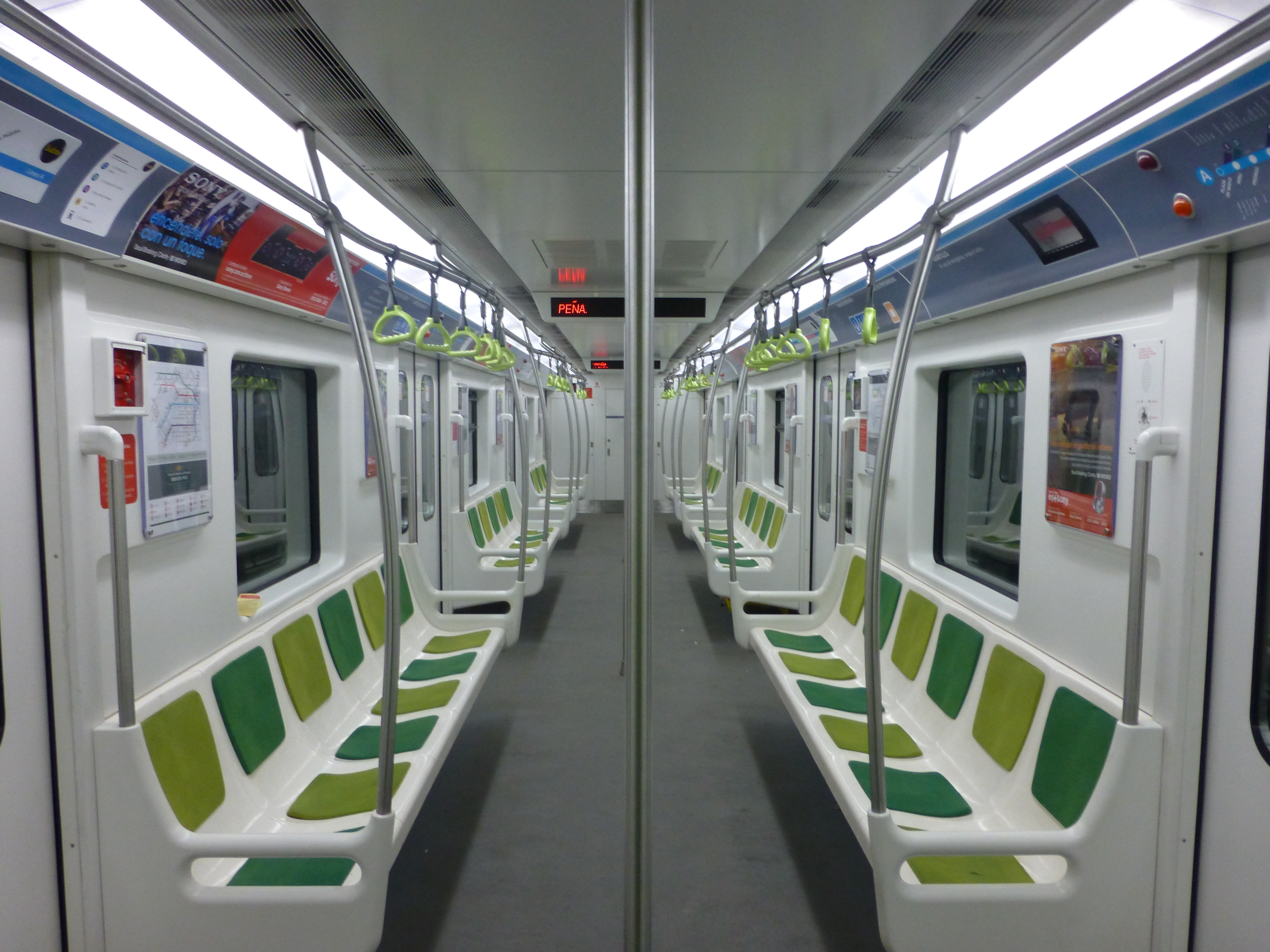
Interior of a 200 Series car.

Until 2013, Line A had been served by La Brugeoise cars and a small number UEC Preston cars, which were retired prior to the Brugeoise cars. These were withdrawn from service on 12 January 2013, 11 months before their 100th anniversary and replaced by 45 new 200 Series cars built by China CNR Corporation. However, the Chinese cars were not sufficient to cover the entire fleet of the line, so it had to be supplemented by a temporary fleet of 35 Fiat-Materfer cars, which was still not enough to replace the 120 La Brugeoise units and thus Siemens-Schuckert Orenstein & Koppel stock reformed by the Emepa Group was also added to the line to make up the numbers. Furthermore, the replacement of the rolling stock coincided with the opening of the San José de Flores and San Pedrito stations and the line was still left with a rolling stock defect, causing a decline in passenger numbers.

A further 105 CNR cars were ordered in 2014 so that the line would be served in its entirety by 150 of these 200 Series cars, and so the temporary replacement rolling stock could be moved to Line E in time for its extension to Retiro. The cars steadily arrived into the country since 2015 and have been incorporated into the line, with the last of the CNR units arriving during 2016 and 2017. Line A's rolling stock now consists entirely of these models.

=== Line B ===
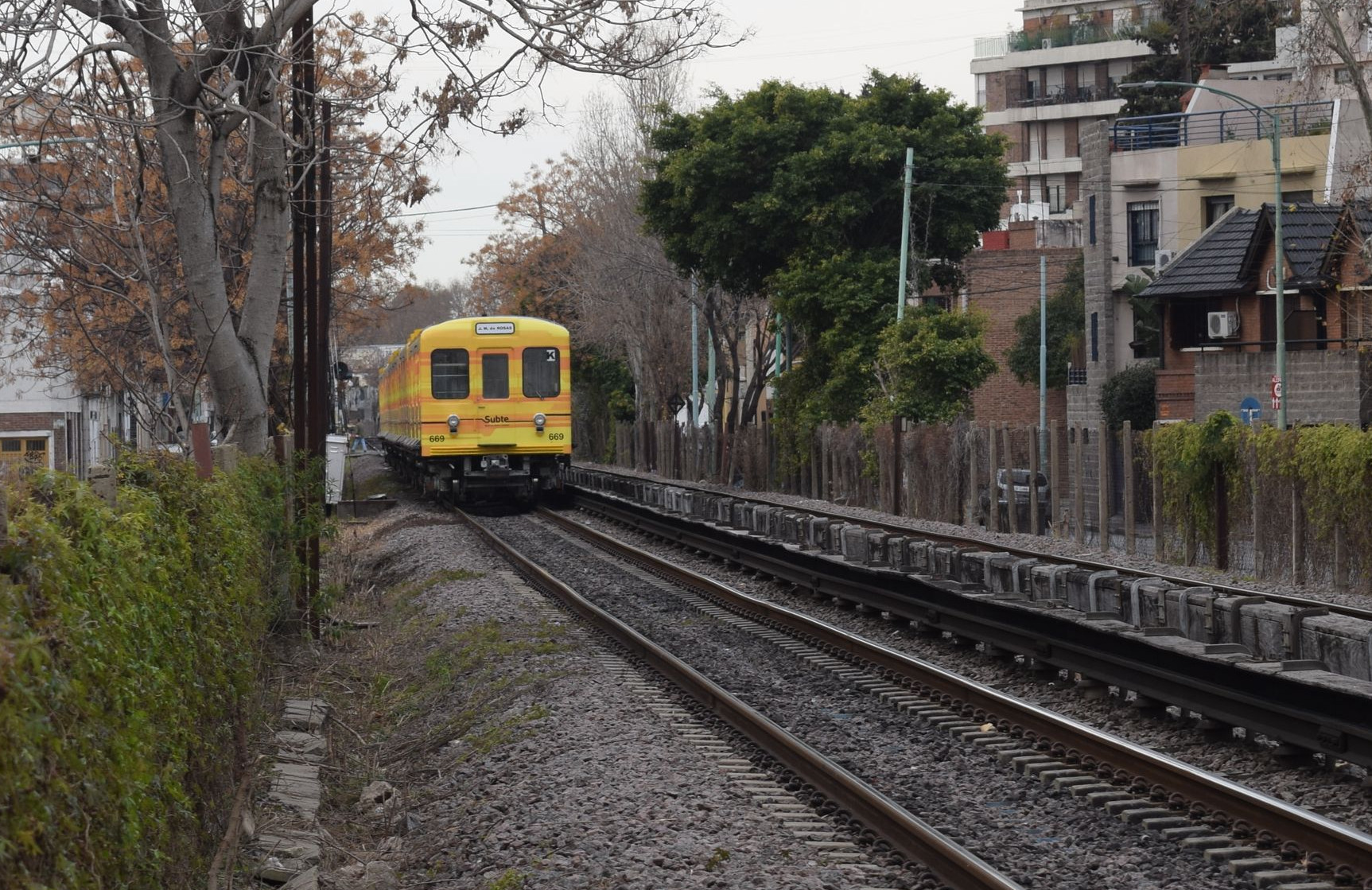
The Eidan 500 trains could continue above ground on the Urquiza Line.

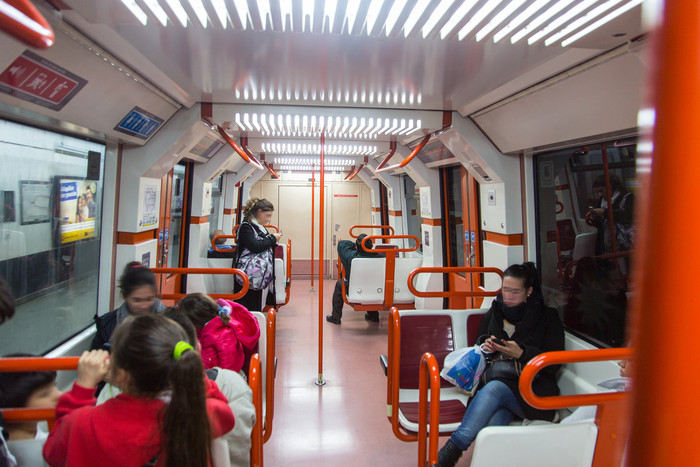
Passengers on board a CAF 6000 train

Line B has been historically the most diverse of the network given its significantly different characteristics to other lines and thus its rolling stock has not been uniform for most of its history. This was addressed in 1996 when rolling stock was purchased from the Tokyo Metro Marunouchi Line in order to make the line uniform. This was also the first time in the network's history that rolling stock was purchased second hand. In 2003, two stations were added to the line, followed by another two in 2013, meaning that the already old rolling stock was now also stretched to capacity. In 2011, it was announced that the Madrid Metro had sold some of its 5000 series trains to the Underground, which had been in operation in Madrid since 1974, and entered service in 2013 in order to make up shortfalls caused by the line's extensions. The 36 Spanish cars were of lower quality and reliability than the Japanese trains, despite being newer, and suffered a series of mechanical issues following their integration into the line.

In July 2013, Madrid Metro sold 73 of its 6000 series cars (which entered service in Madrid in 1998) to Buenos Aires for $38.8 million in order to retire the rest of the Japanese-built trains. A further 13 of these cars were purchased for $7.8 million, bringing the total up to 86. The purchase of the CAF 6000 rolling stock has been met with criticism due to major alterations that were made to the line to accommodate the cars' height, as well as the fact that the second-hand units were not significantly cheaper than simply purchasing new rolling stock, and were not of particularly good quality, unlike the new Line A cars. The biggest drawback of these cars is that, unlike the Eidan 500 and CAF 5000 cars, they use overhead electrification instead of third rail, and were thus initially unsuitable for the line. They had to be adapted to use both third rail and overhead electrification for what was by this point three models of rolling stock being used on the line. Similarly, changing to overhead lines would mean that the potential for an overground branch of the line from Federico Lacroze using Urquiza Line tracks would be lost since that line also uses third rail electrification. Following a series of setbacks caused by the power inefficiency of these trains, as of August 2015 it was unclear if they would be used on the line or moved elsewhere and new plans drawn up for the line which would not involve Spanish rolling stock.

=== Line C ===
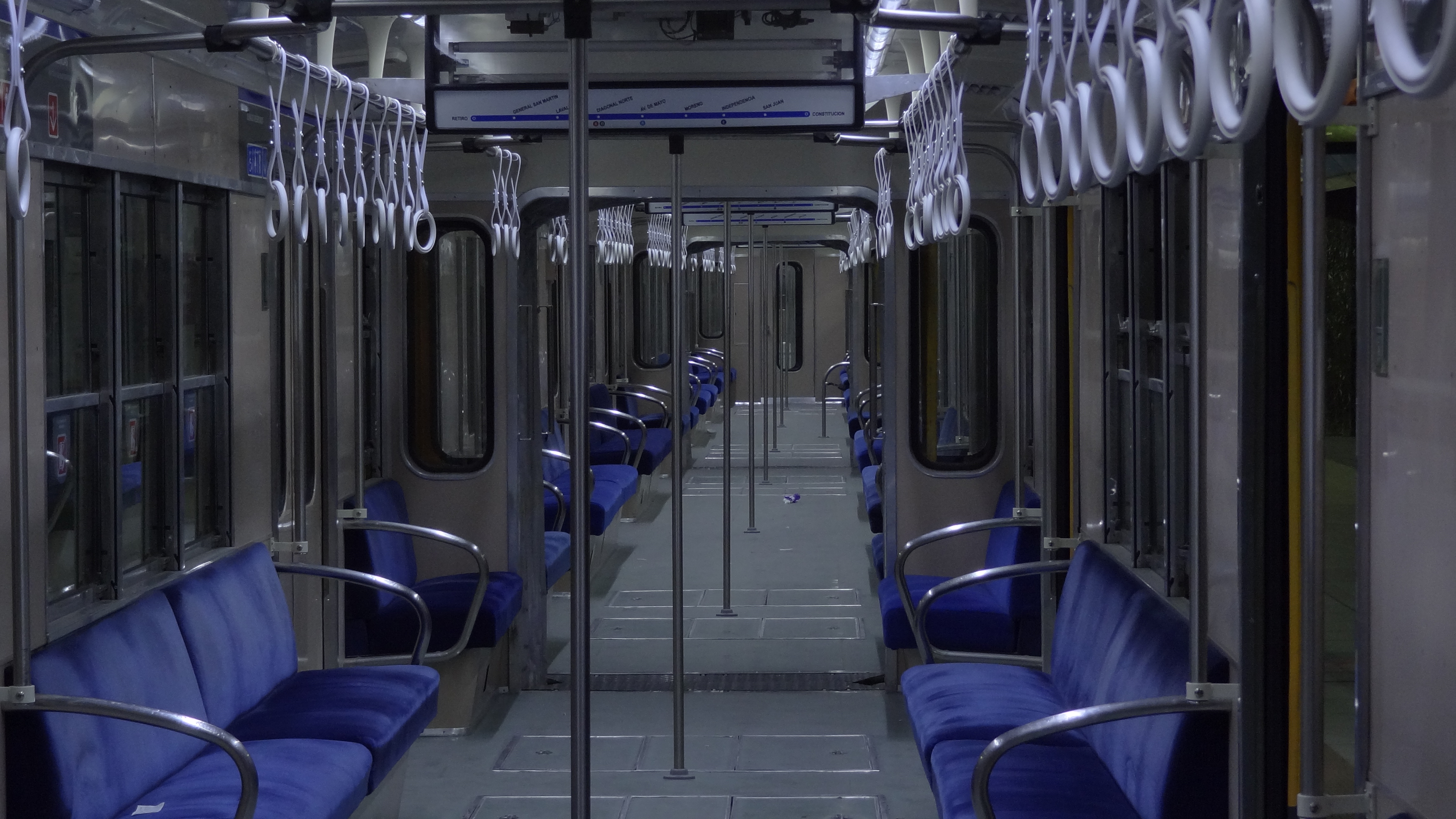
Interior of a Nagoya 300 train.

Line C was originally served by Siemens-Schuckert Orenstein & Koppel rolling stock, which were replaced in 2007 by Nagoya rolling stock transferred from Line D as 100 Series cars arrived on that line. These cars began to be refurbished in 2014, equipped with air conditioning, new lighting and upholstery, among other changes. The refurbishment of the 78 Nagoya cars was completed in 2015–2016. From 2014, 30 additional cars, belonging to the newer 5000 Series, were purchased from the Nagoya Municipal Subway and arrived in the country.

With the incorporation of these trains in 2015, the line has 108 Nagoya cars, though from different series and refurbished to increase the uniformity among them. No long term plans have been made as to what rolling stock the line will use when it is modernised, however the line has been updated with Trainguard Communications-based train control to allow for automatic train operation, meaning that it could be served by such trains.

=== Line D ===
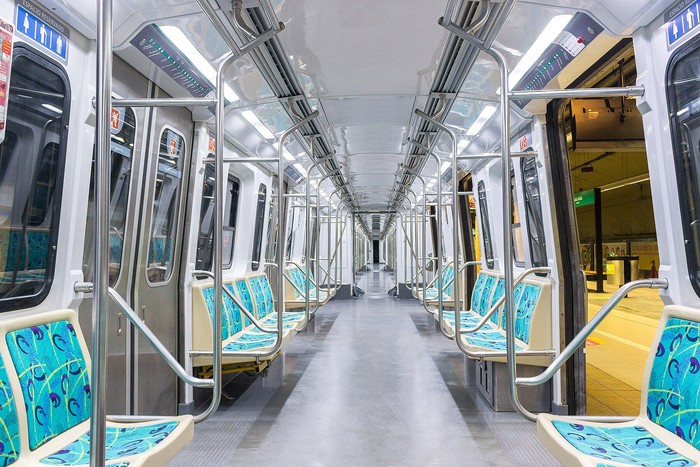
Interior of a 100 Series car following the mid-life refurbishment.

Line D was originally served by Siemens-Schuckert Orenstein & Koppel rolling stock, and then by the CAF/GEE cars from 1968. In 1999, cars from the Nagoya Municipal Subway were purchased second hand from Japan and incorporated into the line. At the time of the incorporation of the Nagoya cars, numerous Alstom Metropolis 100 Series cars were purchased and built in Brazil and Argentina in 2001 with the intention of incorporating them into Line A and replace the Brugeoise rolling stock. However, when these arrived, they were ultimately put in service on Line D where they remain to this day. More Alstom cars of the same type continued to be purchased in that decade up until 2009, making a total of 96 cars.

The remaining Nagoya cars were moved to Line C when the Siemens-Schuckert Orenstein & Koppel cars were retired from that line in 2007 and were replaced with Fiat-Materfer cars, so the line continued to have two models of rolling stock. To make the rolling stock more uniform, 24 more modern 300 Series Alstom Metropolis cars were ordered in 2013 and arrived in 2015, retiring the Materfer cars from the line and meaning that the line is entirely composed of 120 Alstom cars. However, in September 2015, the city presented a new modernisation plan which showed 84 new cars for the line instead of 24. Beginning in 2014, the existing 100 Series cars began to receive a mid-life refurbishment, changing the upholstery and adding air conditioning units to the cars. In early 2016, the final figure had been fixed at 60 new cars. By 2017, the fleet was composed of 156 Alstom Metropolis cars, retiring the Fiat-Materfer cars from the line. In June 2017, the first six Alstom 300 started operating in the line. After the project to add CBTC to the line in 2024, Line D's fleet was made up of exclusively Alstom 300 cars, with the Alstom 100 cars previously assigned to the line were overhauled and transferred to Line E.

=== Line E ===
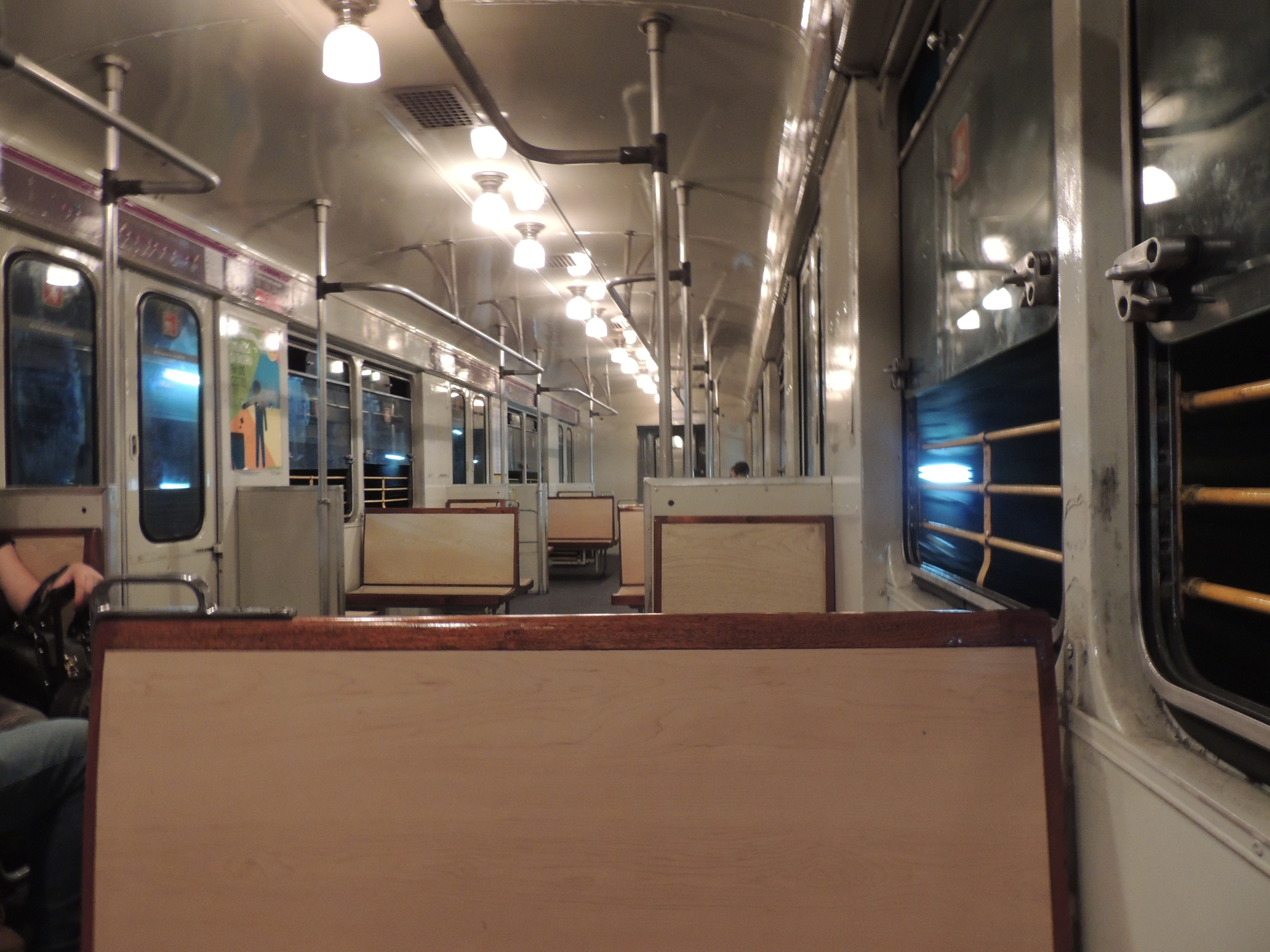
Interior of a CAF-GEE train from Line E.

The line was the last to be inaugurated with Siemens-Schuckert Orenstein & Koppel rolling stock, however these were replaced by Fiat-Materfer cars in the 1980s. The Materfer cars were later sent to Line D and Line D's CAF-GEE rolling stock was put to use on Line E, where it remains until this day, making up the entirety of the rolling stock on the Line. After the new 200 Series and 300 Series rolling stock arrived for Lines A, D and H and the three lines are composed entirely of these two models, the CAF-GEE rolling stock has been retired from Line E and replaced once again with Materfer since the refurbished Siemens by Alstom and the Emepa Group were more than 80 years old and their performance was poor. This change occurred before the completion of the line's extension to Retiro. Today, the line continues to use its Materfer cars, as well as refurbished Alstom 100 cars displaced from Line D.

=== Line H ===
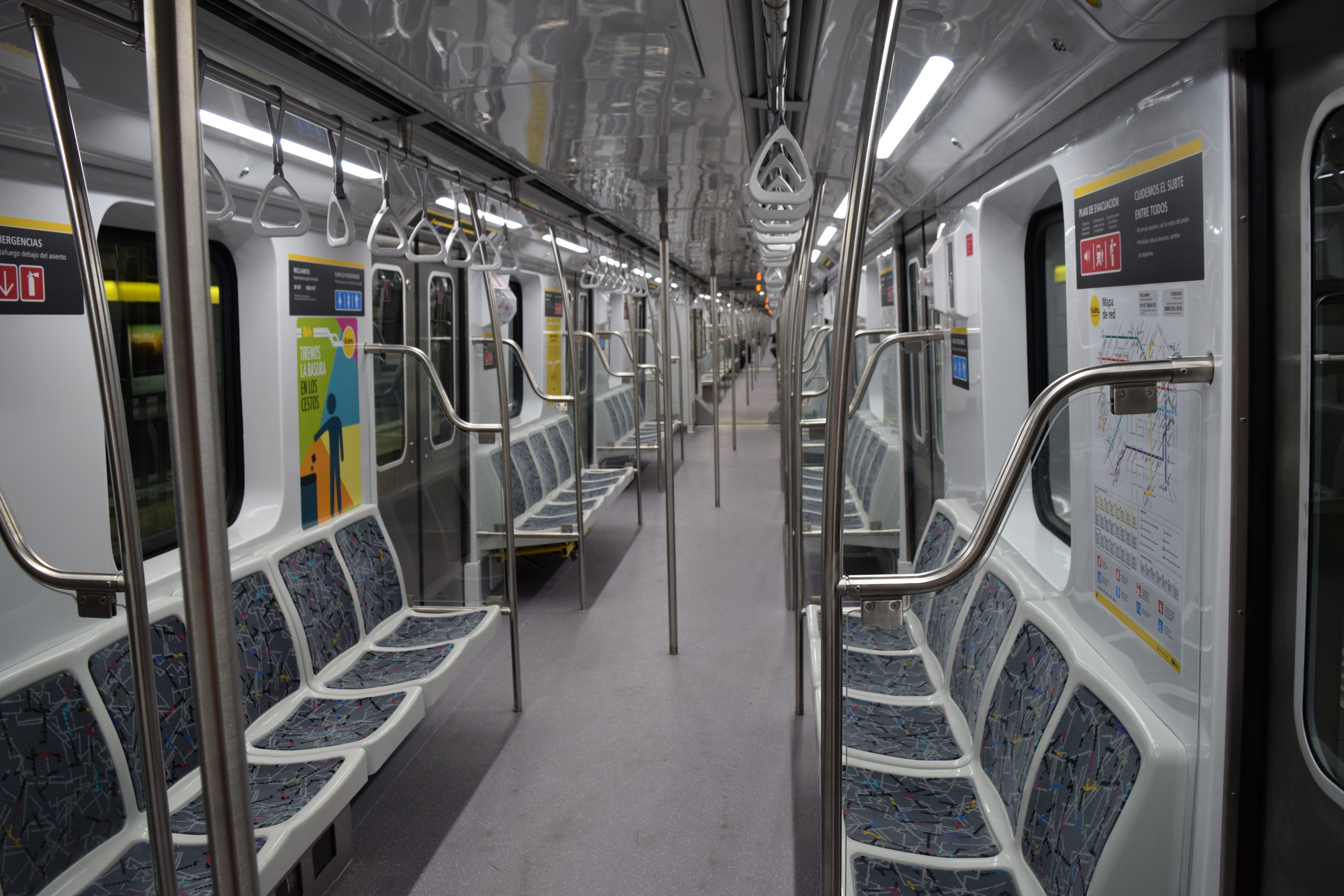
Interior of a 300 Series car.

When Line H was opened in 2007, its short length meant that it could be temporarily served by Siemens-Schuckert Orenstein & Koppel cars until it was extended enough to warrant the incorporation of new rolling stock. For this purpose, 120 new Alstom Metropolis 300 Series cars were ordered from Brazil and began arriving in Buenos Aires in August 2015 in time for the line's extension northwards to Santa Fe. The 20 trains with 6 cars each make up the entirety of the rolling stock of the line as it continues to be extended.

The first 300 Series cars were put into service in July 2016, with the remainder being phased in throughout 2016 and 2017, increasing frequencies to an average of 3 minutes as a result of the increased number of trains as well as the use of Communication Based Train Control (CBTC). The incorporation of these cars also meant the retirement of the Siemens-Schuckert Orenstein & Koppel cars, which were the oldest serving stock on the network.

=== PreMetro ===
When the Premetro was opened in 1987, it was to be served by trams manufactured by the Argentine company Materfer. However, the cars were not ready for the line's inauguration, so it was briefly served by La Brugeoise cars re-bodied by the Emepa Group. The re-bodied cars were nicknamed Lagartos (Lizards) due to their green colour and were soon retired. In 1988, the Materfer trams arrived on the line and the cars continue to serve on it to this day. Originally, 25 cars were to be built since there were to be two Premetro lines, however, only of these 17 cars were built for the E2 line since the E1 line was not built.

=== Future lines ===
Three other lines are planned for the network, however the only line which has been approved for construction as of 2015 is Line F. Construction was due to begin in 2015 so it is yet unknown what rolling stock will be used, though they will be of modern characteristics, with platform screen doors and automated trains being considered.

== See also ==
- Rail transport in Argentina
- Metrovías
- Urquiza Line
