= La Brugeoise cars (Buenos Aires Underground) =

Buenos Aires Underground Line A rolling stock (1913–2013)

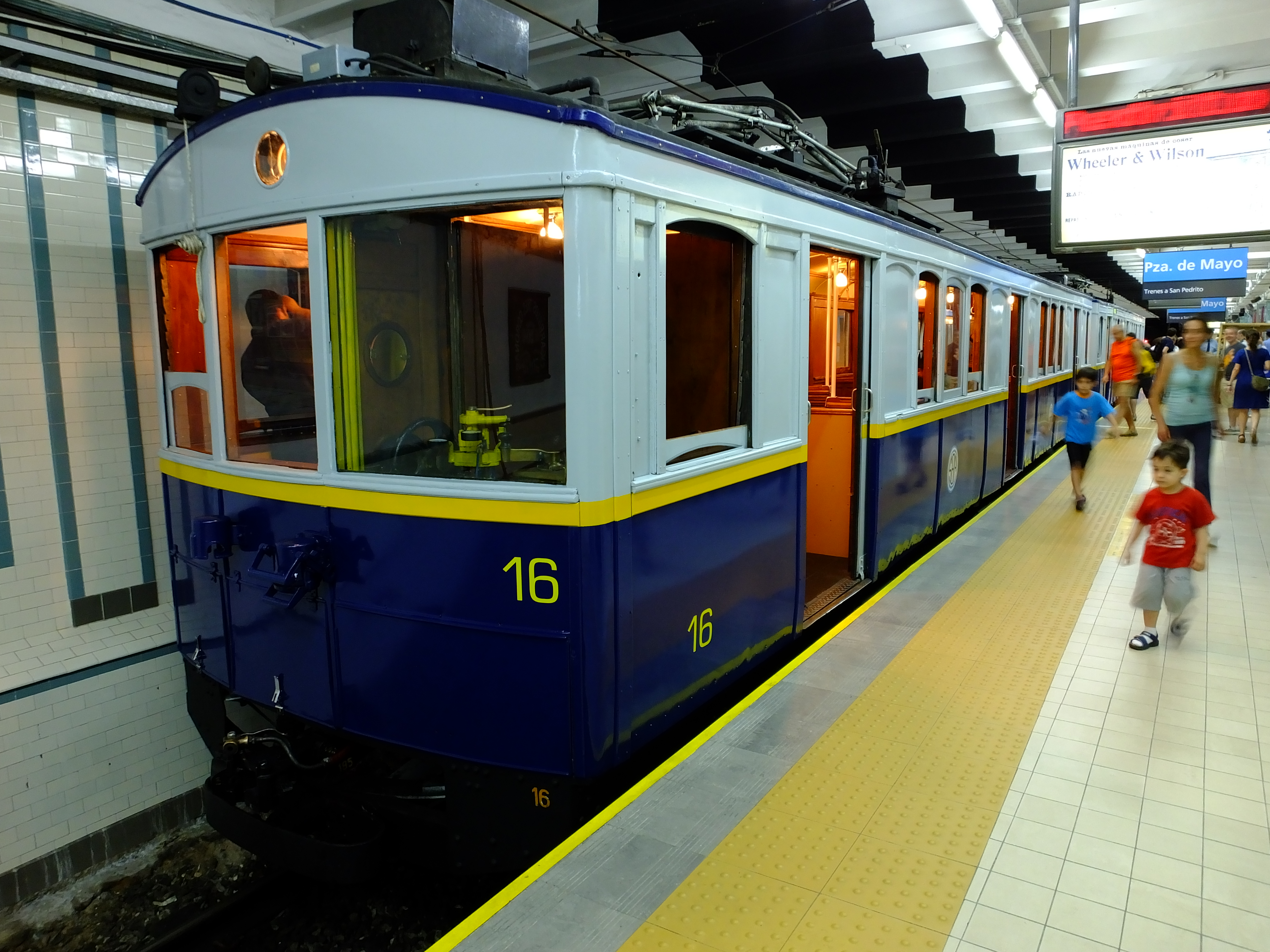
- La Brugeoise train at Plaza de Mayo station.
- In service: 1 December 1913 – 11 January 2013
- Manufacturer: La Brugeoise, et Nicaise, et Delcuve
- Built at: Bruges, Belgium
- Constructed: 1911–1919, 1944
- Refurbished: 1927
- Number built: 125 cars
- Number in service: 100 cars
- Number preserved: 1 car (number 10)
- Number scrapped: 21 cars (By 2012)
- Successor: 200 Series; Fiat-Materfer; 100 Series
- Formation: Maximum 6 cars per trainset (limited by platform length)
- Capacity: 42 sitting + 120 standing
- Operators: Metrovías
- Depots: Polvorín workshop

Specifications
- Car body construction: Wood
- Car length: 15,800 mm (51 ft 10 in)
- Width: 2,600 mm (8 ft 6 in)
- Height: 3,380 mm (11 ft 1 in)
- Doors: 3 pairs per side
- Maximum speed: 50 km/h (31 mph)
- Weight: 27 tonnes (27 long tons; 30 short tons) per car
- Traction motors: Two "U 109" (one per bogie)
- Power output: 115 hp (86 kW)
- Electric system(s): 550/1,100 V DC Overhead
- Current collection: one double-arm pantograph per car
- Bogies: Two per car
- Braking system(s): Air brakes (regular and emergency purposes); manual mechanical brakes (emergency only)
- Safety system(s): Mechanical ATS; overhead lever (one per cab)
- Track gauge: 1,435 mm (4 ft 8 1/2 in) standard gauge

La Brugeoise cars were the Buenos Aires Underground (Subte) Line A rolling stock since its inauguration in 1913 until 2013, when they were replaced by new Chinese stock. They were built by the Belgian rolling stock manufacturer La Brugeoise et Nivelles between 1911 and 1919 for the Anglo-Argentine Tramways Company's (Compañía de Tranvías Anglo-Argentina (CTAA) in Spanish) first underground line. They were originally designed to run both as metro and tramway cars, but they were refurbished in 1927 for underground use only. They became the oldest underground rolling stock in commercial service in the world as well as a tourist attraction and part of Buenos Aires cultural heritage.

== Technical information ==
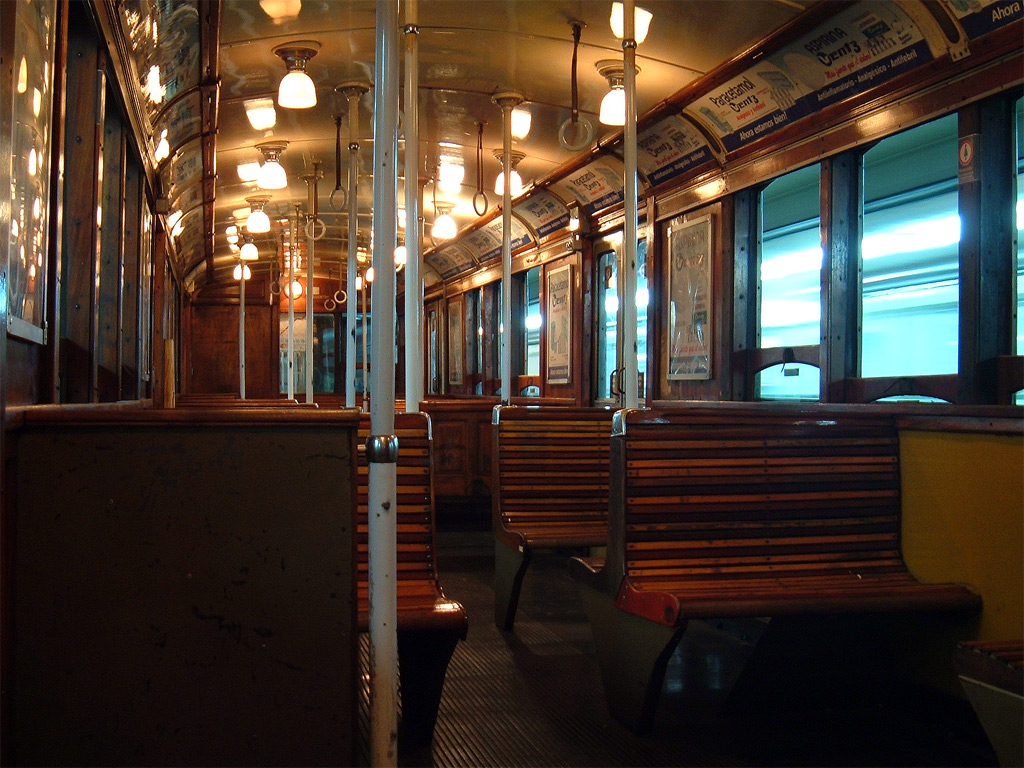
La Brugeoise Interior

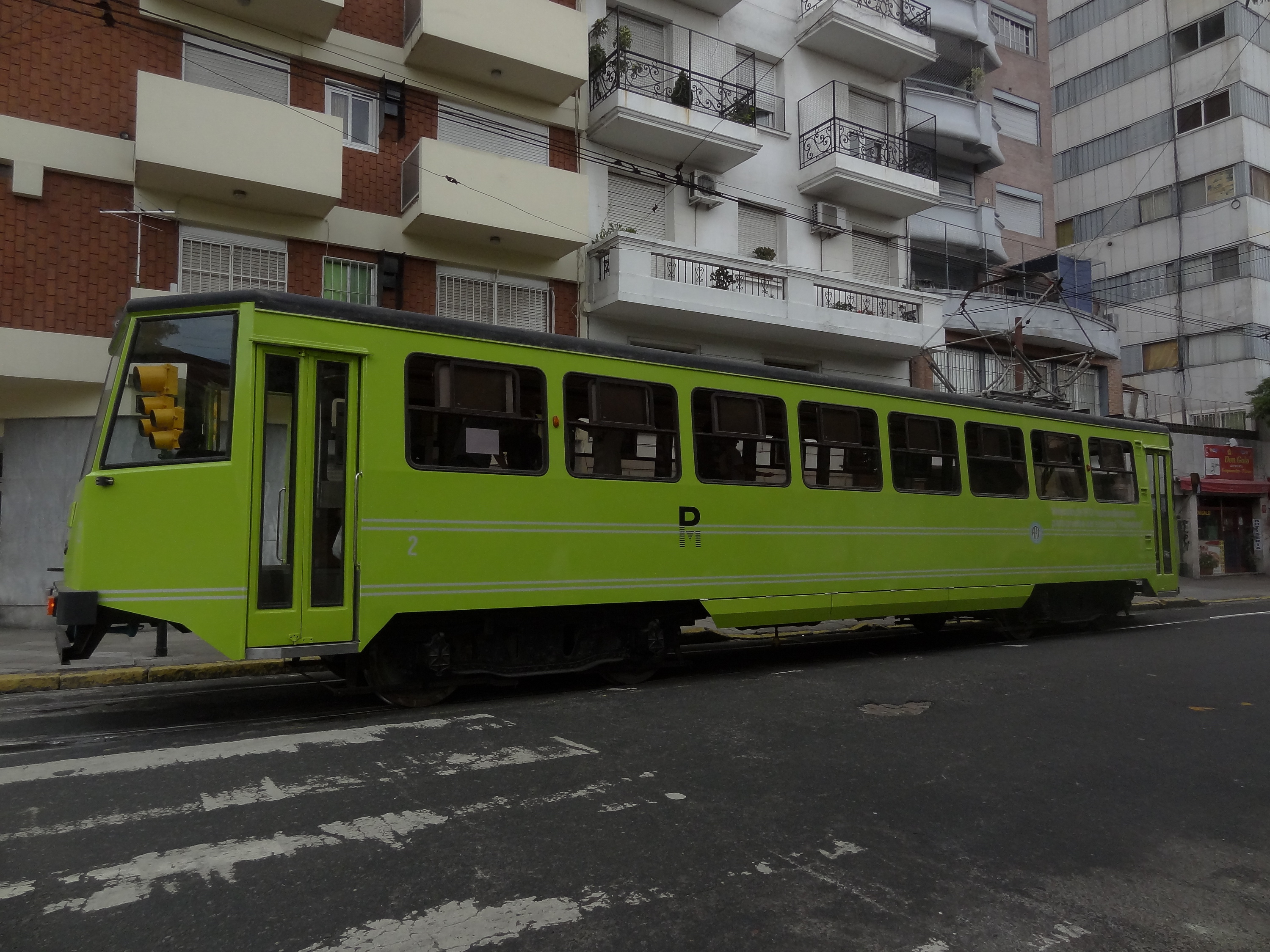
Some cars were refurbished, such as this El Lagarto model used temporarily on the Premetro.

The La Brugeoise trains were designed to run using either 550 VDC (as surface tramways did until the system was closed in 1962) or 1,100 VDC in the tunnels. Traction was controlled through a 9-power run (originally 11-power run) handle, known as the "controller". The motorman would spin the handle anticlockwise to increase acceleration. Its loose end was fitted with the dead man's switch, a button-shaped mechanism that allowed the motorman to either enable or cut current flow to the motors in normal conditions. This system was also meant to serve as an emergency train stop, that is, if anything should prevent the motorman from keeping this button pressed, the train would automatically stop accelerating.

In normal driving conditions, braking was entirely achieved by means of a traditional air brake system. Because of their long life-span, La Brugeoise trains used custom-made brake shoes made of hard wood embedded with creosote for additional resistance. Friction between the steel wheels and the brake shoes released a peculiar fragrance that Line A became known for among porteños (as Buenos Aires inhabitants call themselves) and tourists. The emergency brakes operation was entirely mechanical. The motorman applied these brakes by spinning a wheel located on the right-hand side of the driving cab, tensing up a chain connected to the brake mechanism. If emergency brakes were engaged for more than 10 seconds, current flow to the traction motors and the auxiliary equipment was interrupted by the main fuse.

The trains were equipped with mechanical ATS at the CTAA's workshops. Initially, train traffic on Line A was controlled using manually operated signalling. In the mid-1920s this system was automated by Siemens, including the installation of mechanical ATS and traffic lights. Each train was fitted with two levers called anthennas on top of each driving cab, which was lowered by train stops fixed to the tunnel's wall in case a train passed by a red light, thus applying the brakes and cutting off traction current flow. By 2010, train stops were automatically controlled by digital signal system ATP (Automatic Train Protection) developed and installed by Alstom.

== History ==
La Brugeoise trains were the first electric multiple units (EMU) to run in Argentina. Commissioned by the Anglo-Argentine Tramways Company Ltd for their first underground line, they were designed to run either on the surface as regular tramways or as underground rail cars. Thanks to a ramp built after Primera Junta station, Line A's terminus from 1914 to 2008, two cars were decoupled from arriving trains and continued service as tramways until the intersection of avenida Rivadavia and avenida Lacarra. Thus, each car had a tramway-like platform on both ends used by passengers to board and leave the train when on the surface. When running in the tunnels, passengers entered or exited the car by using the pair of sliding doors on each side of the car body.

The CTAA bought 115 cars, all with the same technical characteristics but with two different car body layouts (or "series"). The first series cars numbered 5 to 50, together with four English Electric luxury cars (numbered 1 to 4 and forming a special train), began service on 1 December 1913.

=== First series (5 to 50) ===
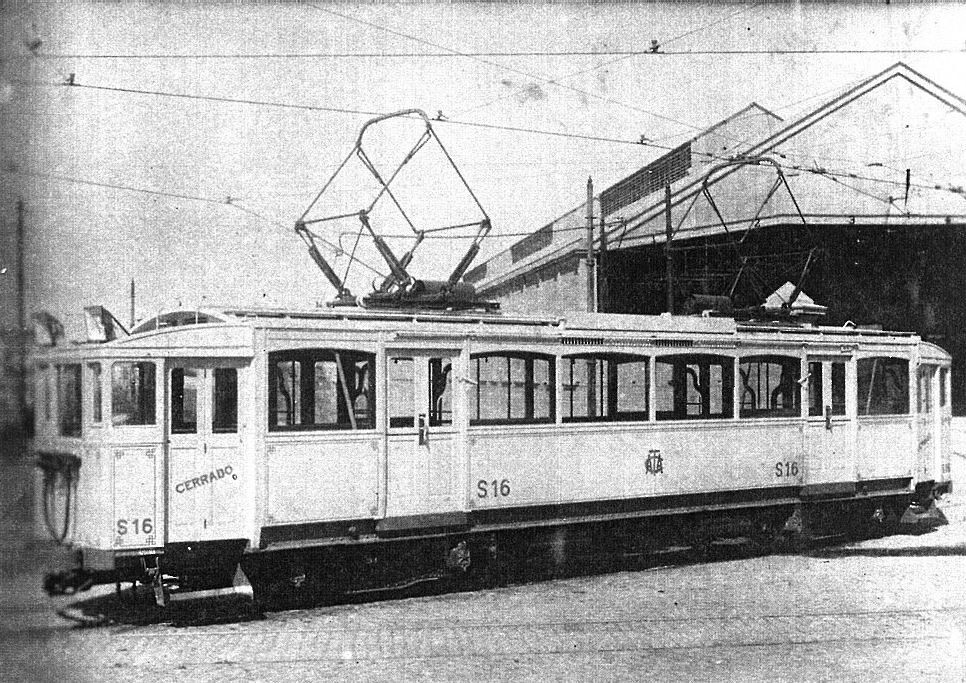
Car 16 of the first series with its original layout in 1915

The first series arrived in Buenos Aires by mid-1913, in time to run preliminary tests. They had six wide windows per side with rolling curtains to protect passengers from sunlight when running on surface. The interior was entirely made of finely carved wood, lit with 38 solid bronze globes using incandescent light bulbs.

Their seats, each with the capacity for two passengers, were upholstered in scarlet leather and arranged in two groups of two seats facing each other. On both sides of each sliding door, a seat was placed longitudinally to allow extra room for standing passengers to travel comfortably.

=== Second series (51 to 120) ===
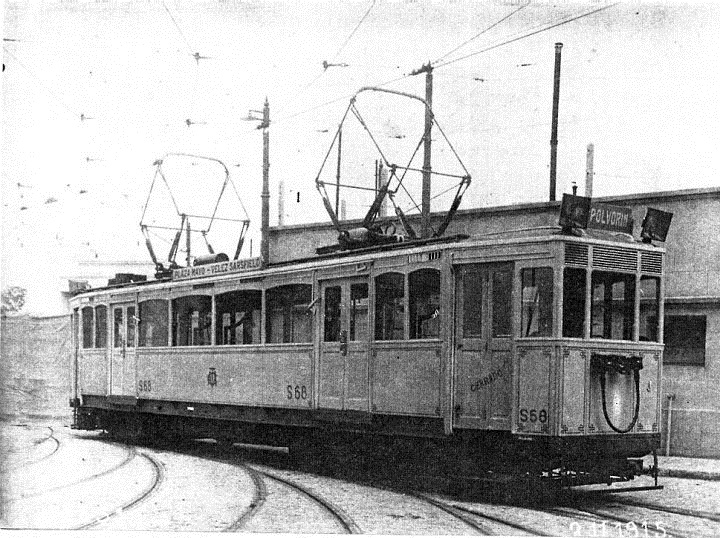
Second series car at the Polvorín workshop, 1915.

The second series arrived in Buenos Aires in two separate groups. Those numbered from 51 to 84 arrived by mid-December 1913, when the line was already operating. The remaining cars, numbered 85 to 120, arrived in 1919 after the end of the First World War.

The second series cars had the same decoration, number and distribution of seats and lights as those of the first series, but they also had some easily recognisable differences. For instance, the second series cars had their tramway-like platform roof at the same level as the salon roof. They also had two smaller windows at the end of the salon instead of the wider ones seen in the first series. This shape and size of windows was later adopted as a model to reform all of the wide windows due to serious structure torsion and stress caused by the tunnel's sharp curves.

=== Refurbishing ===
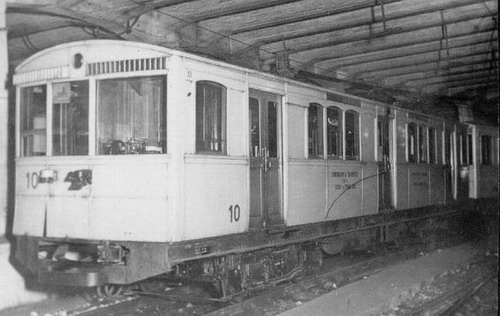
Car 10, refurbished for underground use only. This unit is currently the only one being restored for preservation

After a few years in service, the CTAA began refurbishing the cars after some problems were detected during service. As mentioned above, the windows were gradually narrowed and, after 1923, one pantograph was removed from each car.

On 31 December 1926, the CTAA cancelled the mixed "tramway-metro" service as growing surface traffic caused delays to trains travelling through Rivadavia avenue. Thus, a major reform was decided: 116 units lost their tramway-style platforms, which were replaced by the curved fronts. Also, a third sliding door was added and the seats scarlet-leather upholstery was replaced with wooden bars. Later, minor changes took place. The windows next to the doors were given blinds, with mirrors taking their place on the inside. Also, most cars lost their air intakes except for car 81, which kept them on its sides.

=== Modernisation ===
From 1921, several attempts were made to modernise the cars, so prototypes were built using working and scrapped units. Some of them, such as units 90 and 121, were imitations of the Siemens-Schuckert Orenstein & Koppel cars running in lines C, D and E while others were entirely new designs. Units 124 and 125 were newly manufactured at the Polvorín workshop in 1944 to enhance Subte services during World War II as a lack of imported spare parts for tramways and buses left most of the surface transport out of order.

In 1987, fifteen cars were taken to EMEPA, a workshop established in the city of Chascomús (Buenos Aires province) which specialised in rolling stock overhauls, where a new car body made of metal was built upon the original 1913 chassis and mechanics. These cars were in service up to the day the cars retired.

== Maintenance ==
As spare parts for these trains were no longer available, parts had to be custom-made by request at the Polvorín workshop, where La Brugeoise trains and other Buenos Aires Underground rolling stock were repaired by highly skilled and qualified personnel. According to Metrovías, Buenos Aires Underground private operator, every 20 days cars underwent a routine check-up, while every four years the cars underwent heavy maintenance. Despite their 100 years of uninterrupted service, La Brugeoise trains had one of the lowest mechanical failure averages in the network: 19 every 100,000 km.

Transport authorities replaced the cars with new rolling stock as soon as Line A reaches its new terminus, San Pedrito station. Nevertheless, financial problems affecting the network's expansion from late 2008 made it possible for these trains to reach nearly a century in service. The Buenos Aires City Legislature passed a law indicating that two trains should be restored and preserved in operational condition. They were formed by cars 24 - 107 - 121 - 124 - 125 and 100 - 86 - 22 - 89 - 48. It also ordered that cars 27, 81 and 114 be preserved due to certain unique details in their decoration and structure that distinguished them from the rest. In January 2010, national transport authorities announced that an agreement for the provision of 279 cars had been reached with Chinese rolling stock manufacturer CITIC. Forty-five of these cars were to be operational by late 2011 on Line A, thus gradually replacing the La Brugeoise units. However, the cars were not retired until January 12, 2013, when local authorities suspended service on line A in order to finally replace the aging cars with new Chinese-made 200 series cars. The upgrade was completed in two months.

After retirement, certain units were used as decoration in parks. Others were kept as museum pieces, but the majority went to the Polvorín workshop.

== Heritage service ==
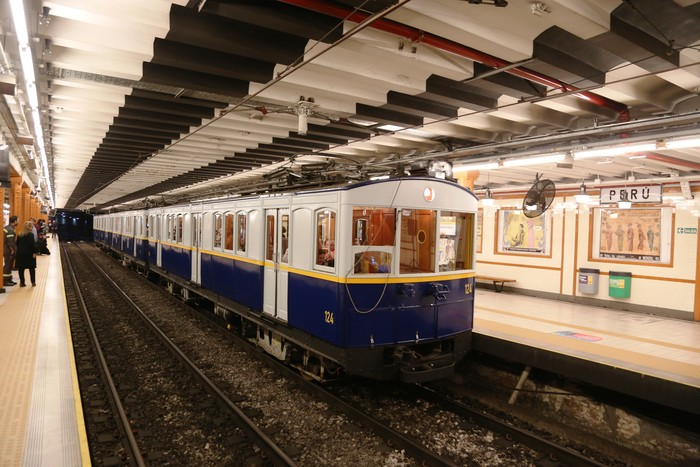
La Brugeoise car during its first heritage trip

After the sanction of law 4886, it was determined that some of the preserved cars would be used in a heritage service, which was finally implemented in September 2017.

== See also ==
- Buenos Aires Underground rolling stock
- Line A (Buenos Aires Underground) - the line where the cars operated
- UEC Preston - similar cars, 4 of which operated alongside La Brugeoise cars
- 200 Series - the rolling stock which replaced the cars
- Siemens-Schuckert Orenstein & Koppel - Another car model which has served many years on the network
- Trams in Buenos Aires
- Heritage streetcar
- Anglo-Argentine Tramways Company
