= UEC Preston =

Tram in Buenos Aires, Argentina

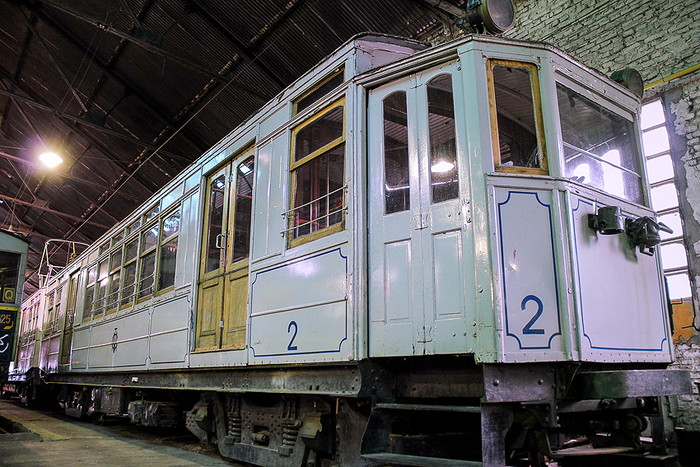
- Car No.2 at the Polvorín Workshop
- In service: 1913-1977
- Manufacturer: United Electric Car Company
- Built at: Preston, Lancashire
- Refurbished: 1927 (for underground-only use)
- Number built: 4
- Number preserved: 3
- Number scrapped: 1
- Formation: 1-4
- Operators: Anglo-Argentine Tramways Company; Buenos Aires Underground

Specifications
- Car body construction: Wood
- Doors: 4 per side
- Track gauge: 1,435 mm (4 ft 8 1/2 in) standard gauge

The UEC Preston is a tram/subway car built by the British manufacturer United Electric Car Company for the Anglo-Argentine Tramways Company (AATC) in 1912 for use on its then newly built underground tramway in Buenos Aires, which was later to become Line A of the Buenos Aires Underground. Only 4 trams were built and they served on the line up until their retirement in 1977.

== History ==
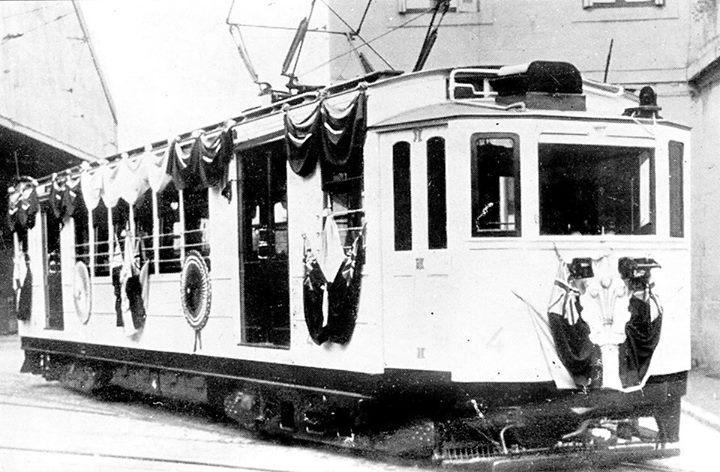
No.4 decorated for the state visit of the Prince of Wales

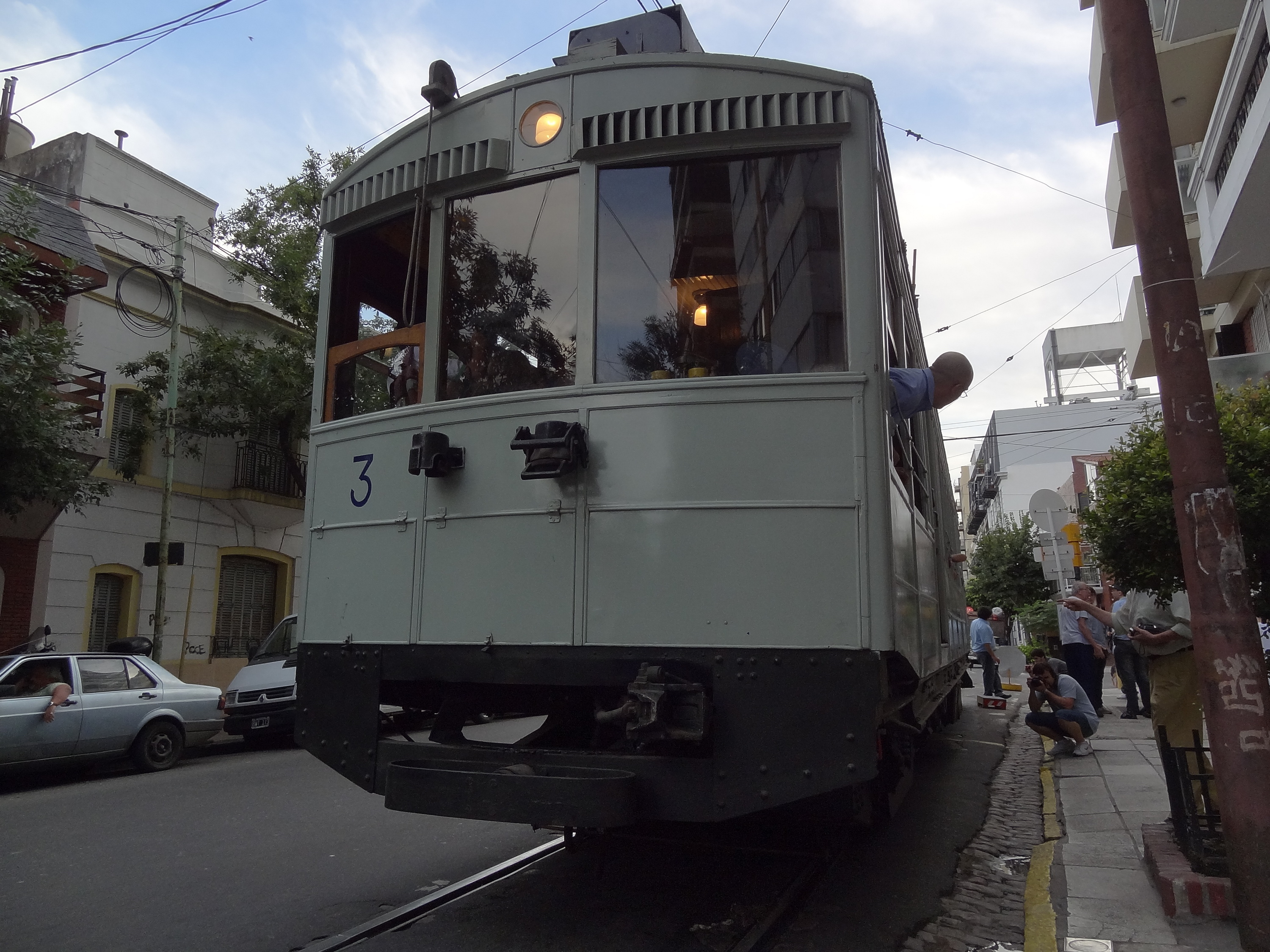
One of the main changes made to the cars when they were converted was the removal of the front and back street-level doors.

The AATC operated a vast network of trams in Buenos Aires by the early 20th century and the company set out to build the first underground tramway in the city, which later became part of the Underground network. The line would go underground through the centre of Buenos Aires and then continue as an overground tram service using a ramp at Primera Junta station, which leads to what is today the location of the Polvorín Workshop where it continued through the Caballito neighbourhood. The company needed rolling stock to serve the new line and thus took bids from two companies: the United Electric Car Company and the Belgian company La Brugeoise et Nicaise et Delcuve.

UEC sent 4 of these trams to Buenos Aires for the AATC's consideration. Though their exterior design was very similar to the La Brugeoise trams, the Preston trams were noted for their extravagant interiors. The trams had seats made of Indonesian rattan; oak frames and panelling; and handrails, handles and lights made of bronze. Ultimately, the AATC would settle for the more economical La Brugeoise cars, though the 4 Preston trams still remained in service on the line.

In 1927, both the Preston and La Brugeoise trams were refurbished for underground use only since it was decided that they would no longer serve above ground. The Preston cars 2 and 3 each had one of their front segments (along with respective doors) removed, while cars 1 and 4 had both removed and the four were coupled into a single formation independent of the La Brugoise cars, which were incompatible.

The cars were primarily used for special events and the transportation of VIPs in their 64 years of service. One notable example was a convoy used to transport Edward VIII (then Prince of Wales) and other officials during a state visit to Argentina in 1925. After the retirement of the Preston cars, they were briefly brought back into service in 1983 to take officials from the Argentine Congressional Palace to the Casa Rosada for the inauguration of President Raúl Alfonsín when the country returned to democratic rule following the collapse of the National Reorganisation Process junta.

== Preserved cars ==
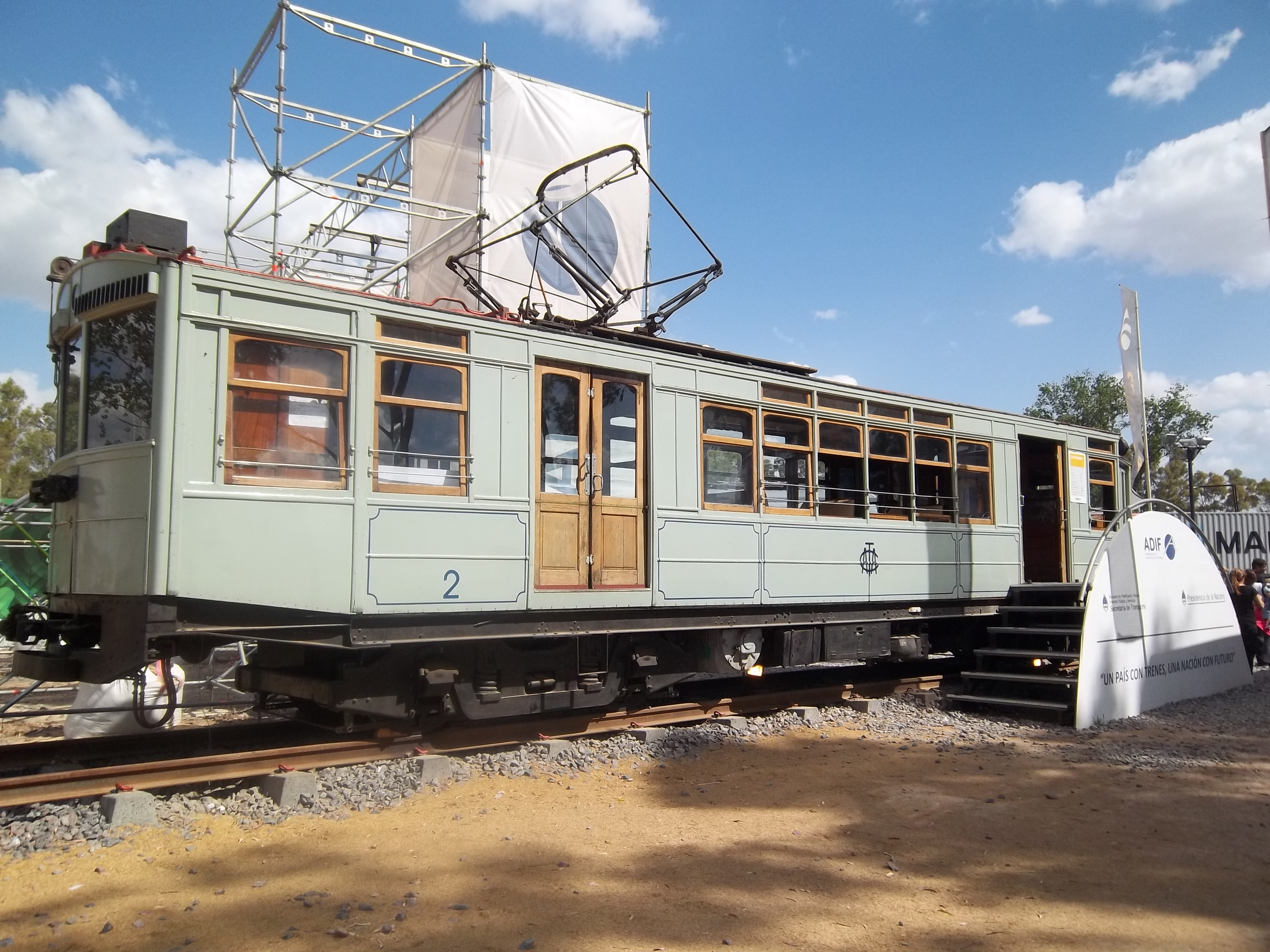
Car No.2 at Tecnópolis with the 1927 changes.

Following their retirement from the Buenos Aires Underground in 1977, car No.1 was scrapped in the early 1980s. Following the creation of the Association of Friends of the Tramways (AAT) in that same decade, the Buenos Aires Underground presented car No.3 to the AAT in order for it to be restored to commemorate the 70th anniversary of the Underground. It officially became part of their collection in 1994.

Car No.2 lay abandoned in the Polvorín Workshop until 2004 when it was also restored by the AAT to celebrate 90 years since the arrival of the Underground to the Caballito neighbourhood where the workshop is located. This car was also exhibited at the Tecnópolis exhibition in 2011, then later returned to the AAT in 2012, albeit with some damage due to rain.

In 2006, the AAT discovered car No.4 in the city of Banfield where it was being used as a shop. The car was then purchased and returned to the Polvorín Workshop where it was restored by the AAT. All three remaining cars are now stored in the Polvorín Workshop and used on the Buenos Aires Heritage Tramway, and also on Underground Line A during special occasions, such as for the 100-year anniversary of its opening in 2013.

== Gallery ==
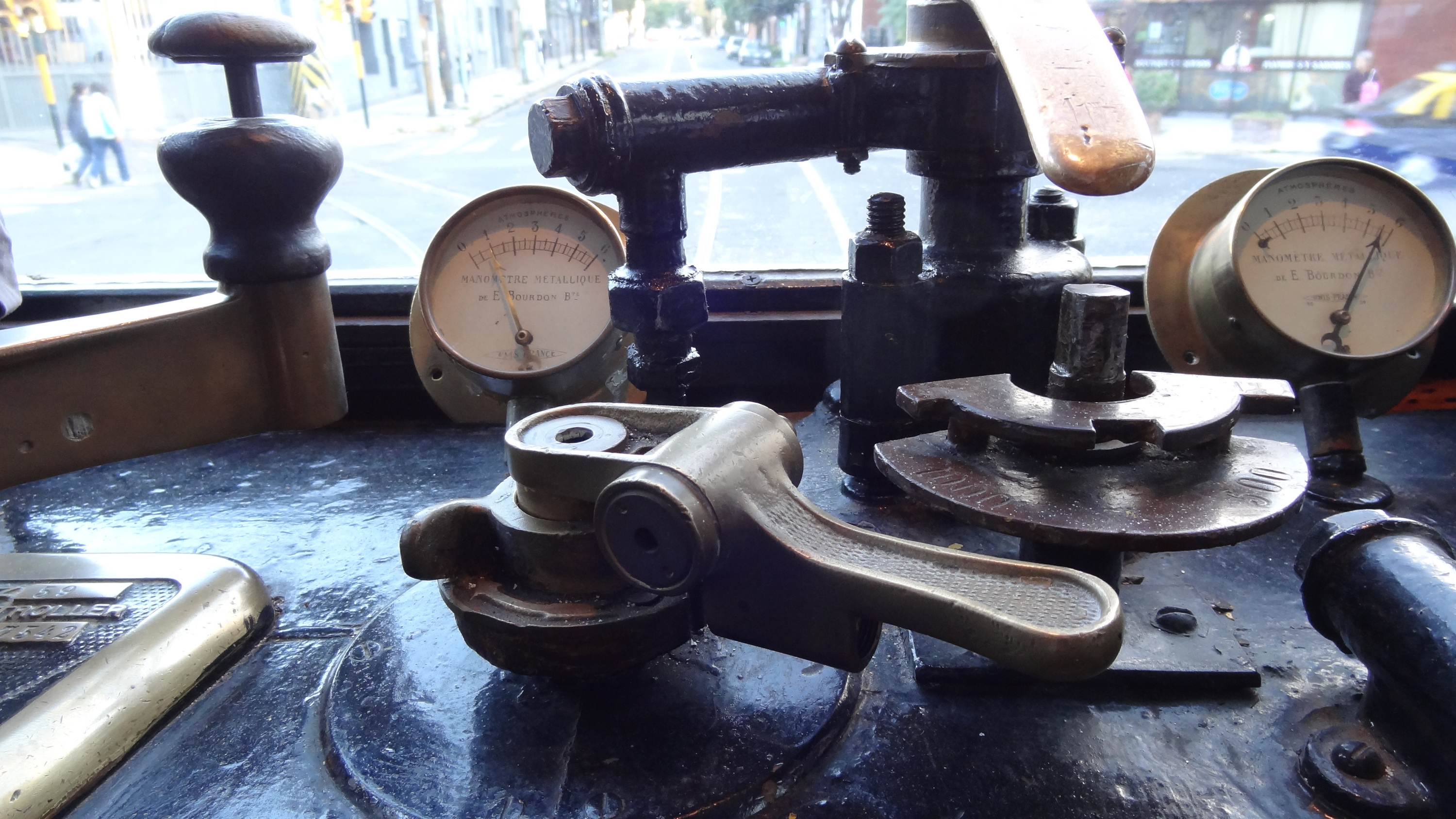
Controls of one of the cars

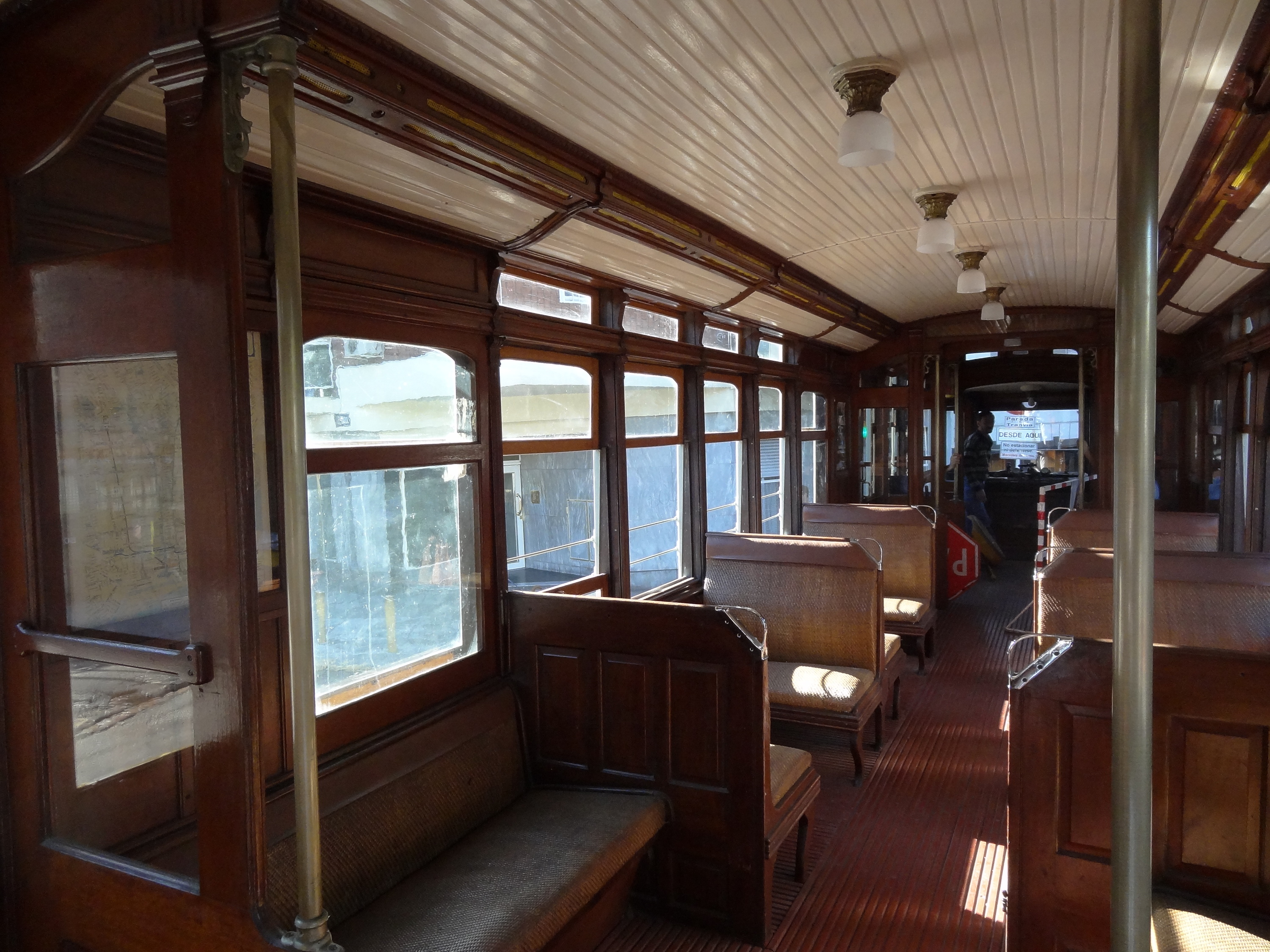

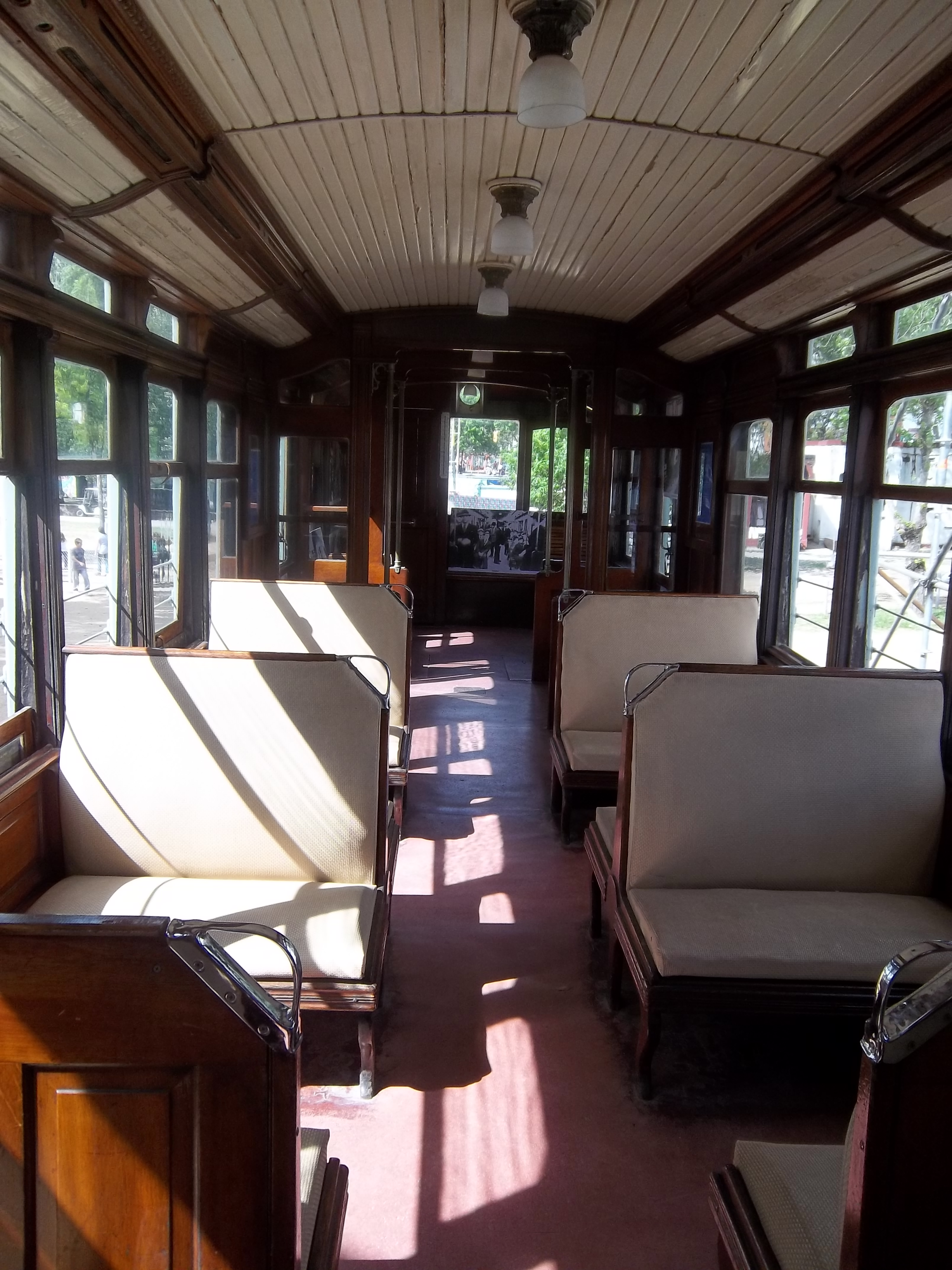
Interior of car No.2., many luxurious interior fixtures were lost when it fell into disrepair

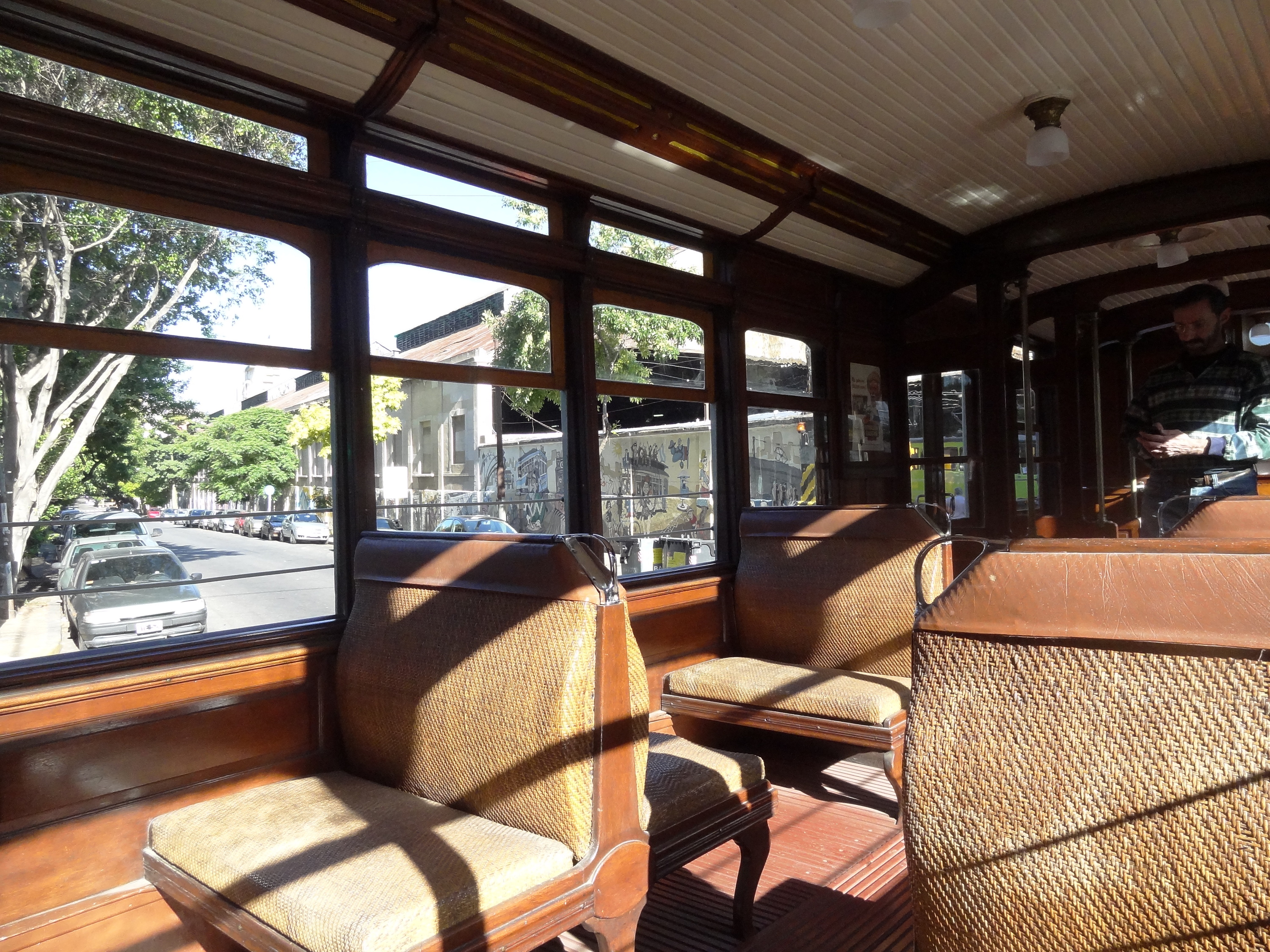

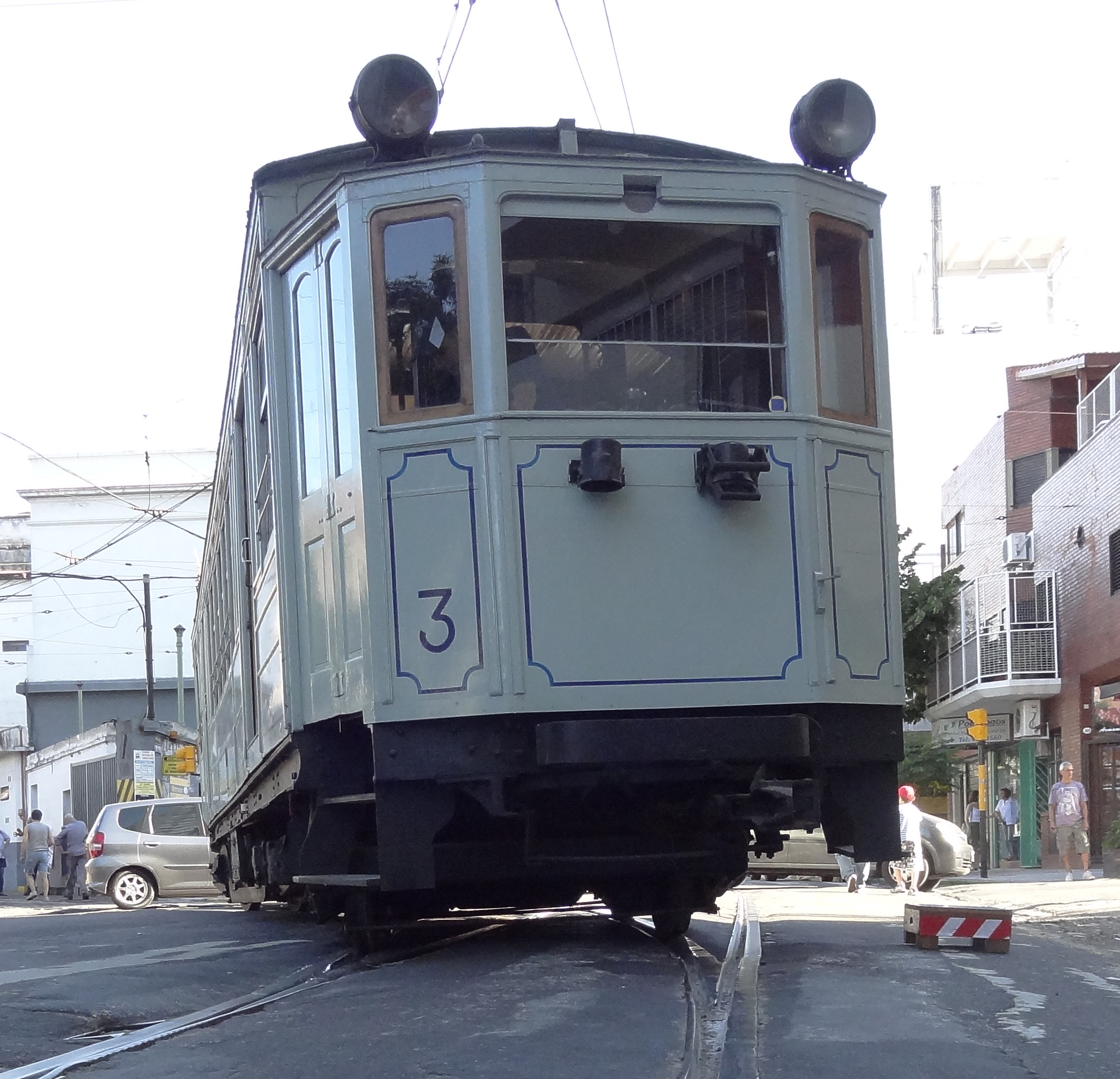
Car No.3 on the Buenos Aires Heritage Tramway

== See also ==
- Trams in Buenos Aires
- Buenos Aires Underground rolling stock
- Line A (Buenos Aires Underground)
- La Brugeoise cars (Buenos Aires Underground)
- Anglo-Argentine Tramways Company
