= Anglo-Argentine Tramways Company =

Former company

Anglo-Argentine Tramways Company Ltd.
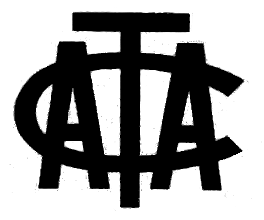

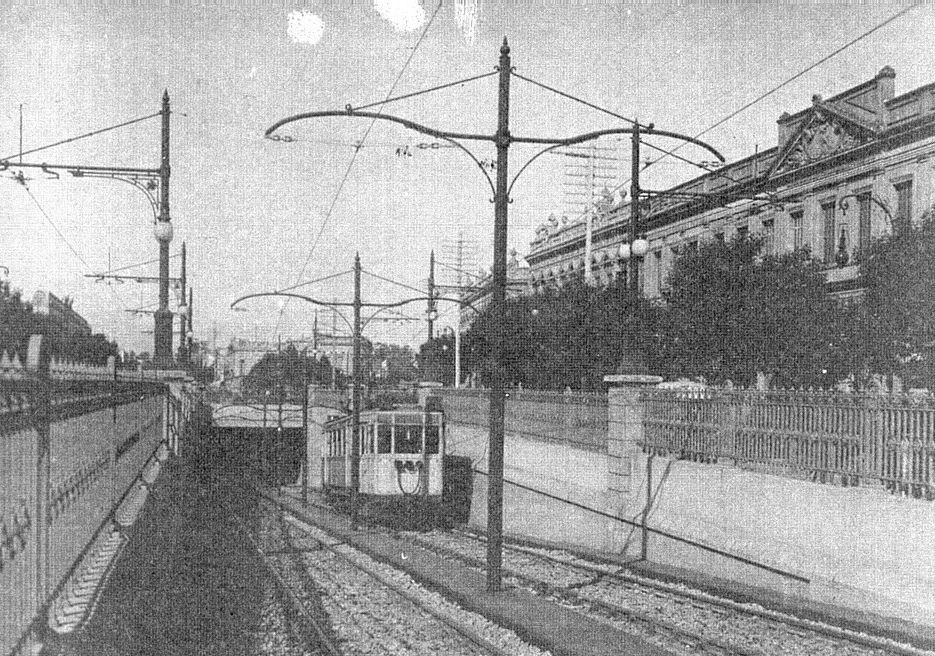
- An AATC Brugeoise tram in 1913
- Type: Private company limited by shares
- Industry: Transportation
- Founded: 1876
- Defunct: 1952
- Headquarters: London
- Key people: Bernard Docker, Samuel Hale Pearson
- Services: Tramways, Underground
- Owner: Sofina (after 1907)

The Anglo-Argentine Tramways Company (Spanish: Compañía de Tranvías Anglo Argentina), known simply as La Anglo in Argentina, was a large transportation company which operated the majority of the trams in the Buenos Aires network, which was also one of the largest in the world at the time having lines totalling 875 km (544 mi) in length. The company also created Buenos Aires' first underground tram line, which would go on to become Line A of the Buenos Aires Underground. The company also owned other tramways around the country.

== History ==
The company was founded in 1876 by British and Anglo-Argentine investors in order to acquire the existing Buenos Aires tramway network, within the context of the country's belle epoque, where it was receiving significant investments from foreign companies. By the turn of the century, the company owned a significant number of tramways throughout Argentina, most notably the Buenos Aires and Rosario Tramways. In Rosario, the company opened its first line in 1886 and later bought five of the local tramway companies, while operating 106 km (66 mi) of lines there through concession.

=== Purchase by Sofina ===
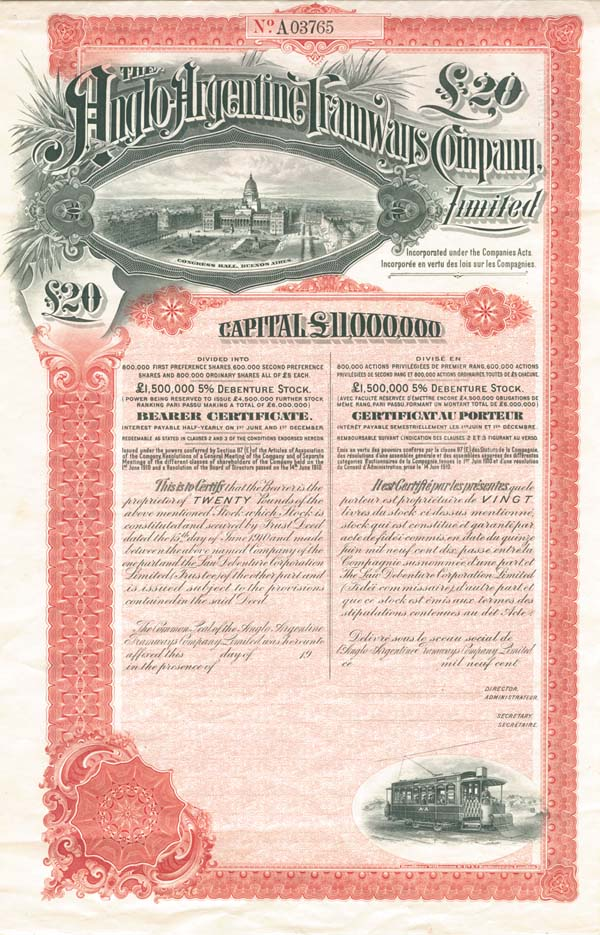
Stock certificate written in both English and French, showing the Argentine Congress.

In 1898, the Belgian company Sofina began acquiring shares in the AATC at a time when the company was electrifying its Buenos Aires network, where the company owned 120 km (75 mi) of lines by this point, as well as the electrification of the Rosario network, which was completed in 1908. By 1907, Sofina created a new company Compagnie Générale de Tramways de Buenos Aires to absorb the Anglo-Argentine and purchase other companies in the city and already by 1909 it had become the largest transport company in Argentina. The newly formed company's shareholders were made up of a number of different nationalities and included prominent European investment banks such as Paribas and Deutsche Bank.

=== Line A ===
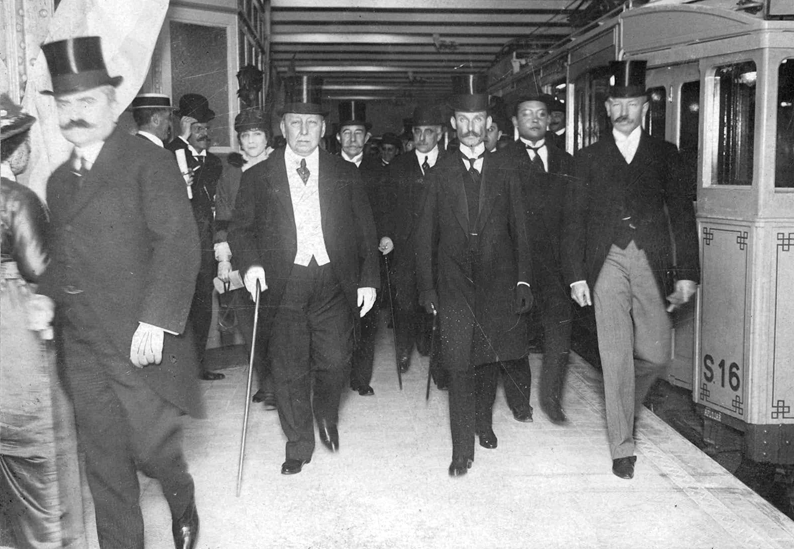
Argentine officials alongside Samuel Hale Pearson at the inauguration of Line A.

Construction of Line A of the Buenos Aires Underground began on 15 September 1911, with the German company Philipp Holzmann being contracted by the AATC to undergo the works. When the line was opened on 1 December 1913, it became the first Underground line in the Southern Hemisphere, Latin America and the Spanish-speaking world. During the line's opening, the company's president Samuel Hale Pearson companied the Argentine vice president Victorino de la Plaza and the city's mayor Joaquín de Anchorena on the inaugural trip.

The original Anglo-Argentine line ran underground from Plaza de Mayo in central Buenos Aires to the neighbourhood of Caballito, where it continued above-ground tram services through an access ramp at Primera Junta station, which also provided access to the company's main workshop and storage area at the Polvorín Workshop. The workshop operates to this day (albeit in a more minor role) and was built in 1914 to service the line's La Brugeoise and UEC Preston rolling stock.

=== Demise ===
By 1938, the company (light blue) owned most of the lines in Buenos Aires.

In the years following the formation of the Compagnie Générale de Tramways de Buenos Aires, they came to own the vast majority of the Buenos Aires tram network, with the exception of a few Argentine companies such as the Lacroze Company's Tramway Rural. However, increased competition from bus travel and the construction of new lines for the Buenos Aires Underground, anti-monopoly laws and a devaluation of the Argentine peso all meant that the AATC was in an increasingly difficult situation by 1930.

By 1936, the company's accumulated losses had reached £2.5 million (around £92 million in 2005 money) while the company was facing serious competition from the Compañía Hispano Argentina de Obras Públicas y Finanzas (CHADOPyF, Hispanic-Argentine Company for Public Works and Finances), which had recently completed Line C and was close to completing Line D. That same year, the government of Buenos Aires also began to organise public transport under a large mixed holding company known as the Corporation for Urban Transport (Corporacion de Transportes Urbanos) which was put into effect in 1938.

The AATC remained largely independent, however in the post-war period, the political climate in Argentina had changed significantly and under the leadership of Juan Peron, the country's railways had been nationalised in 1948. That same year, the Argentine National Congress approved a law which would see the nationalisation of Buenos Aires' public transport in the shortest possible time frame. In 1951, a large portion of the Corporation for Urban Transport was bought up by the state for AR$400 million, while the corporation had already accumulated debts with the state worth AR$2 billion. All of the corporation's assets were then transferred over to the state in January 1952.

The AATC's shareholders did not recognise the purchase and – together with the Corporation for Urban Transport's other shareholders – made the British ambassador to Argentine intervene on numerous occasions. Argentina and the United Kingdom then reached an agreement in December 1952 to resolve the matter of the transferral of assets quickly, however, this would turn out to be fruitless. The conflict ensued until 1963, when it was ultimately taken to the Buenos Aires Court of Appeals, which recognised that the Argentine state was partly responsible for the loss of capital of the foreign shareholders.

== Legacy ==
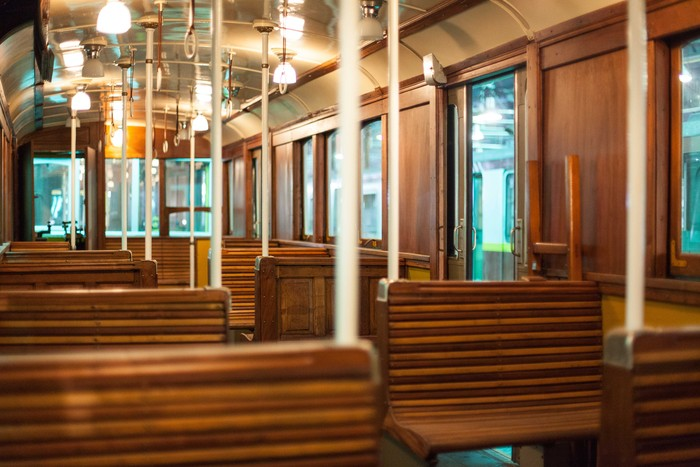
Refurbished Brugeoise car.

Though the Buenos Aires tramway network ceased widespread operations in the 1960s, along with the other cities in which the AATC operated, many remnants of the original company can still be seen. In Buenos Aires, the Polvorín Workshop still functions as the maintenance area for Line A of the Buenos Aires Underground, and is currently being put out of use and converted into a museum for the network.

The original Brugeoise cars are being restored to run tourist services on Line A and to be exhibited in different museums around the country. Meanwhile, the UEC Preston cars belonging to the company are used on Buenos Aires' heritage tramway, which runs in the neighbourhood of Caballito using parts of the AATC's original route. Similarly, Line A has preserved its original appearance and, along with the Brugeoise cars and workshop, is considered a national historic monument.

In Rosario and Buenos Aires, tracks can still be seen in some neighbourhoods while a project in Rosario may use some of the company's original segments upon re-activating the tramway.

== Gallery ==
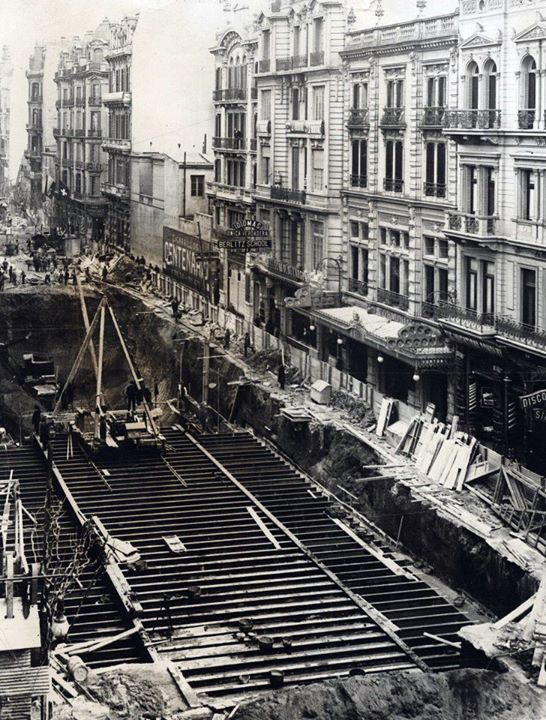
Construction of Line A

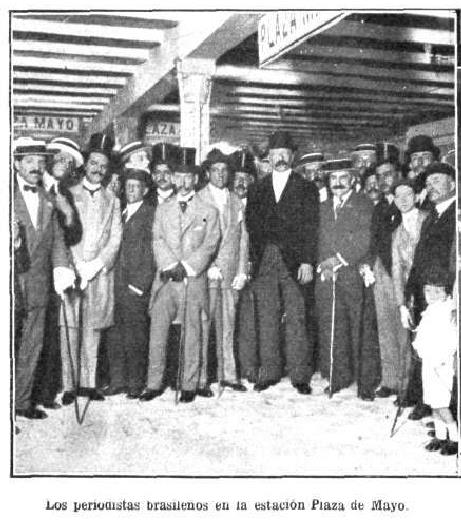
AATC employees with journalists in November 1913

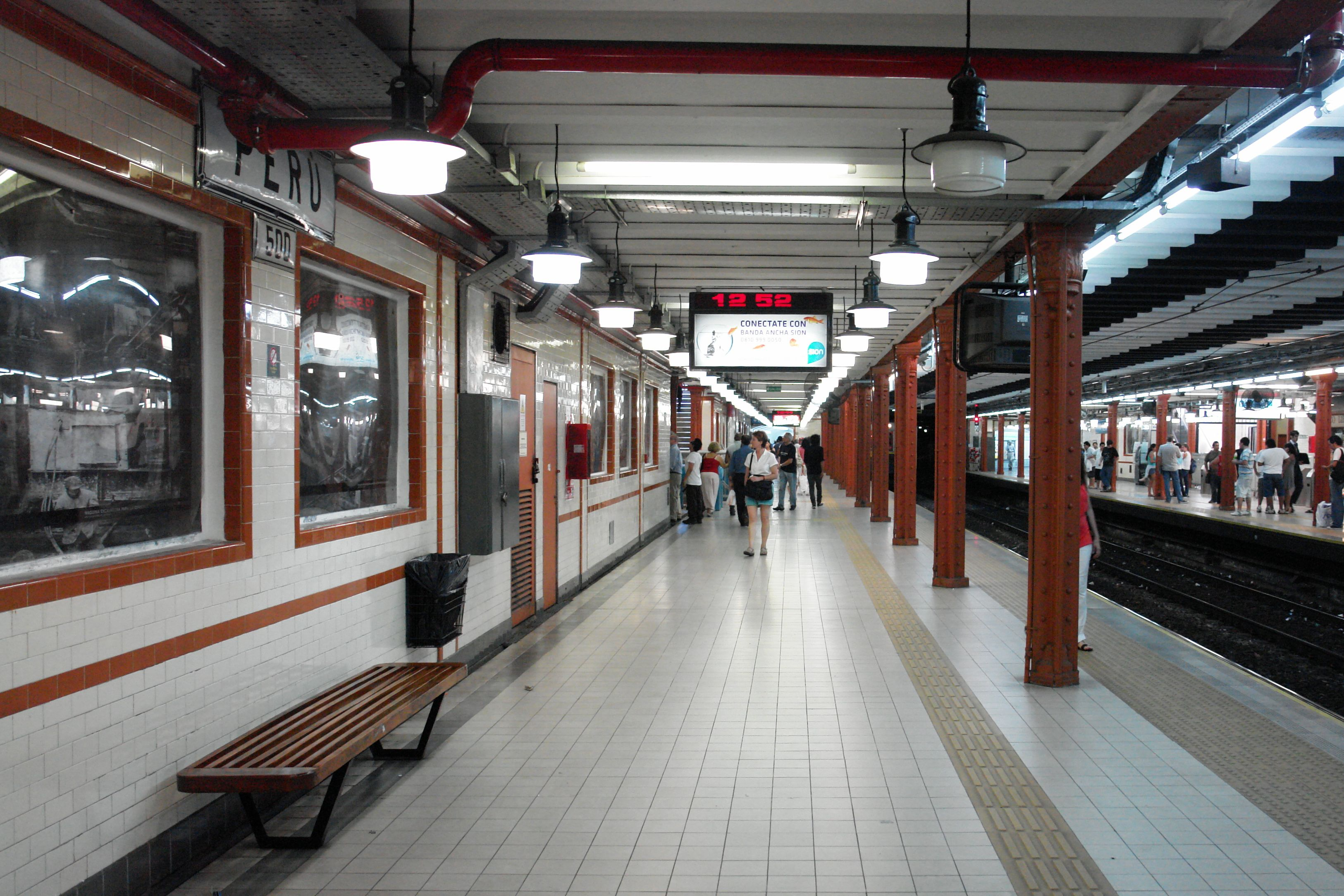
Line A's stations remain largely unchanged from when they were built by the AATC

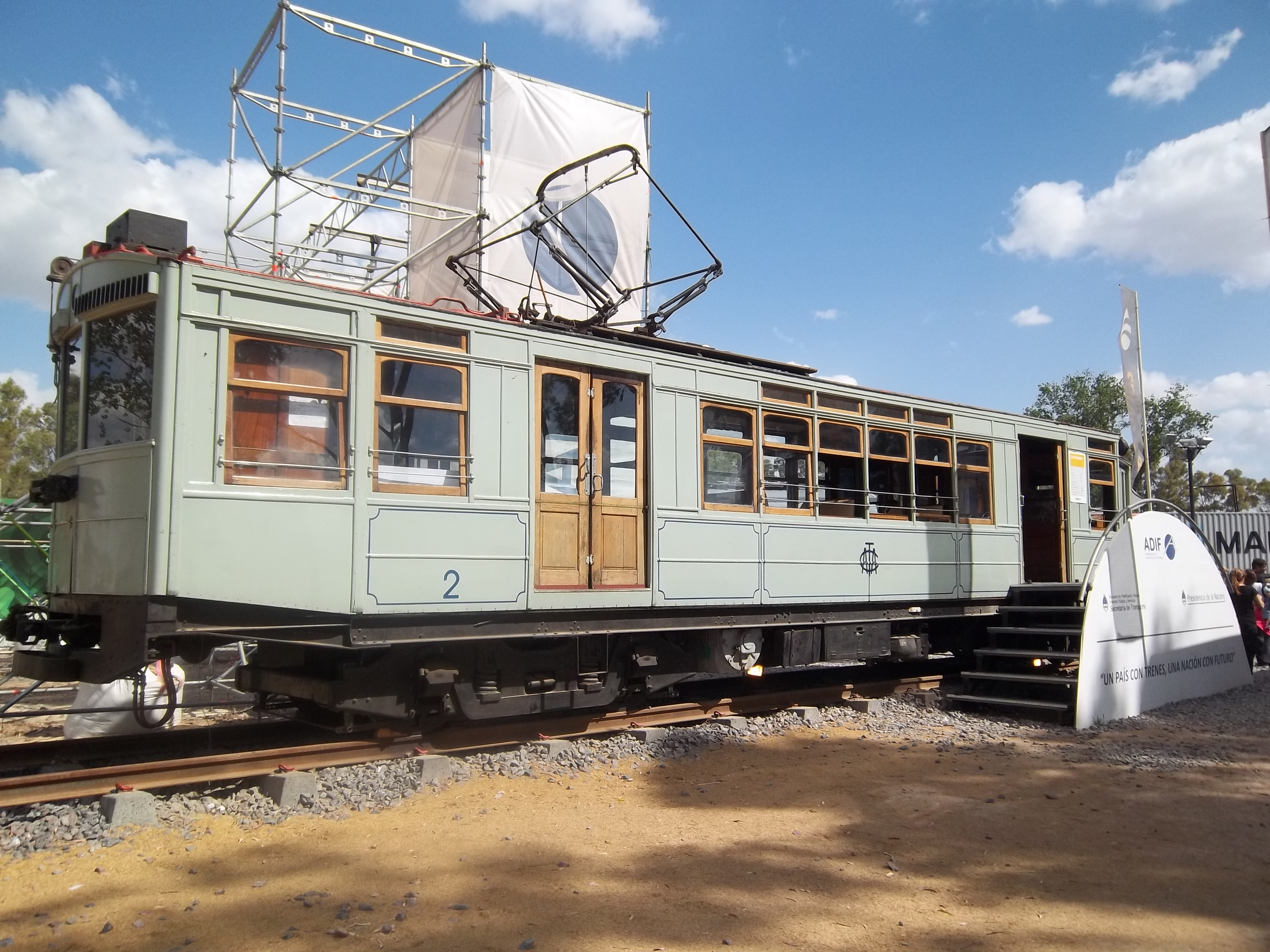
UEC Preston car exhibited in AATC livery

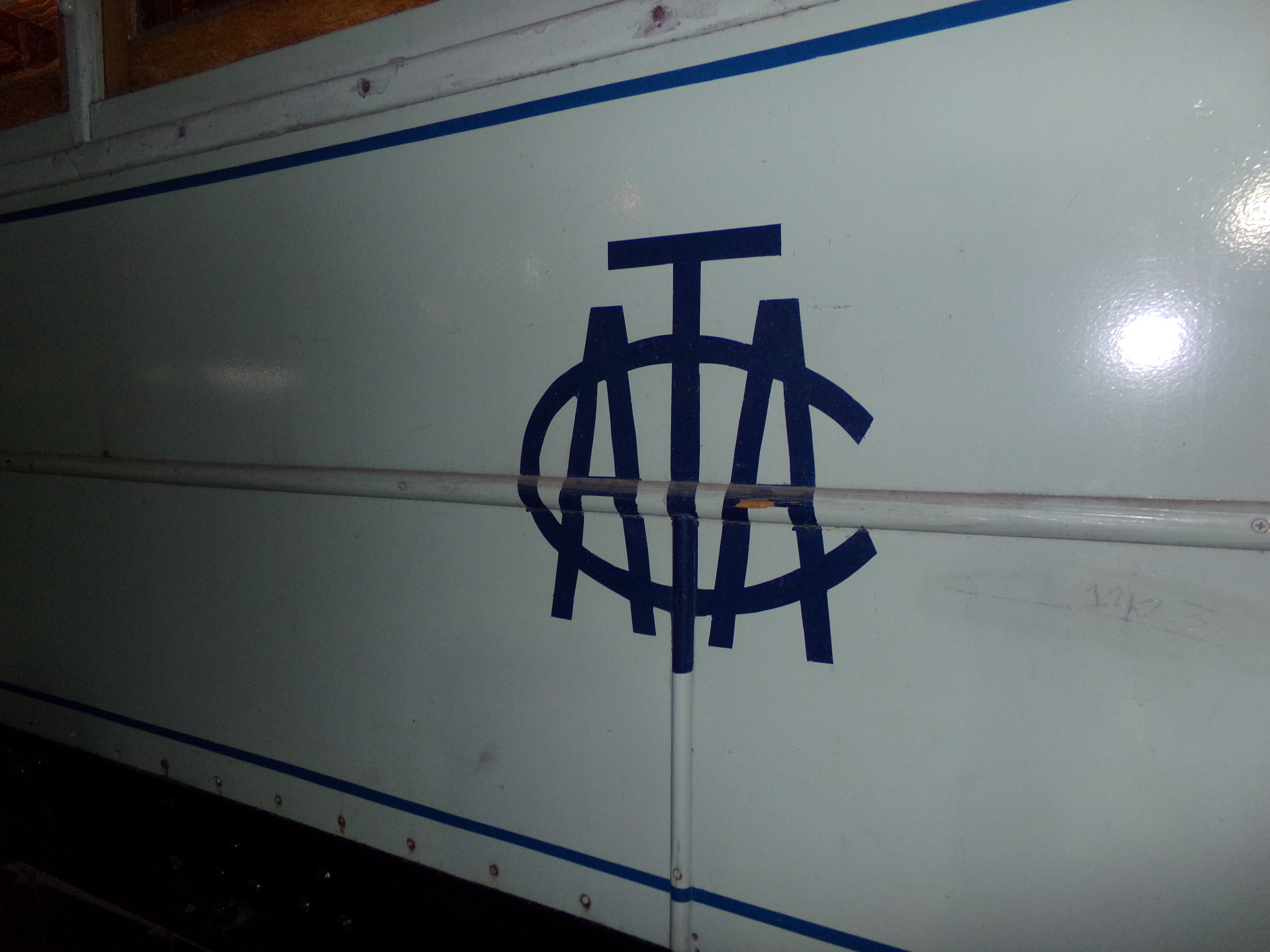
AATC logo on the side of a UEC Preston car

== See also ==
- List of town tramway systems in Argentina
- Trams in Buenos Aires
- Trams in Rosario
- Line A (Buenos Aires Underground)
- Anglo-Argentines
