= Polvorín Workshop =

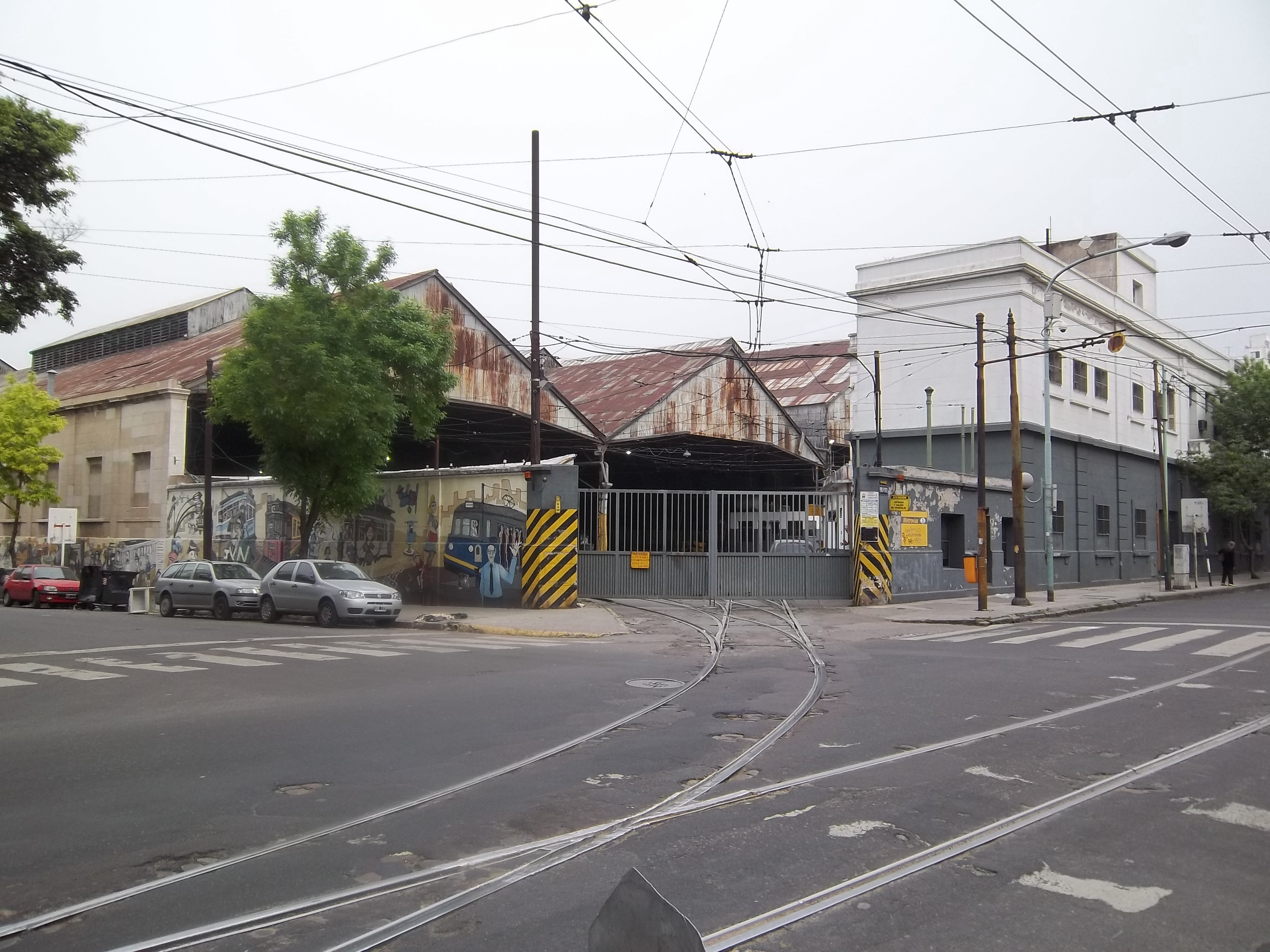
Exterior view of the workshop. Note tram rails and overhead lines.

The Polvorín Workshop (Spanish: Taller Polvorín) is a rolling stock storage and maintenance workshop in Buenos Aires that primarily serves Line A of the Buenos Aires Underground. It also serves as the main storage and restoration area for the Association of Friends of the Tramway (AAT), who run a heritage tramway in the neighborhood of Caballito, near to where the workshop is located.

== History ==
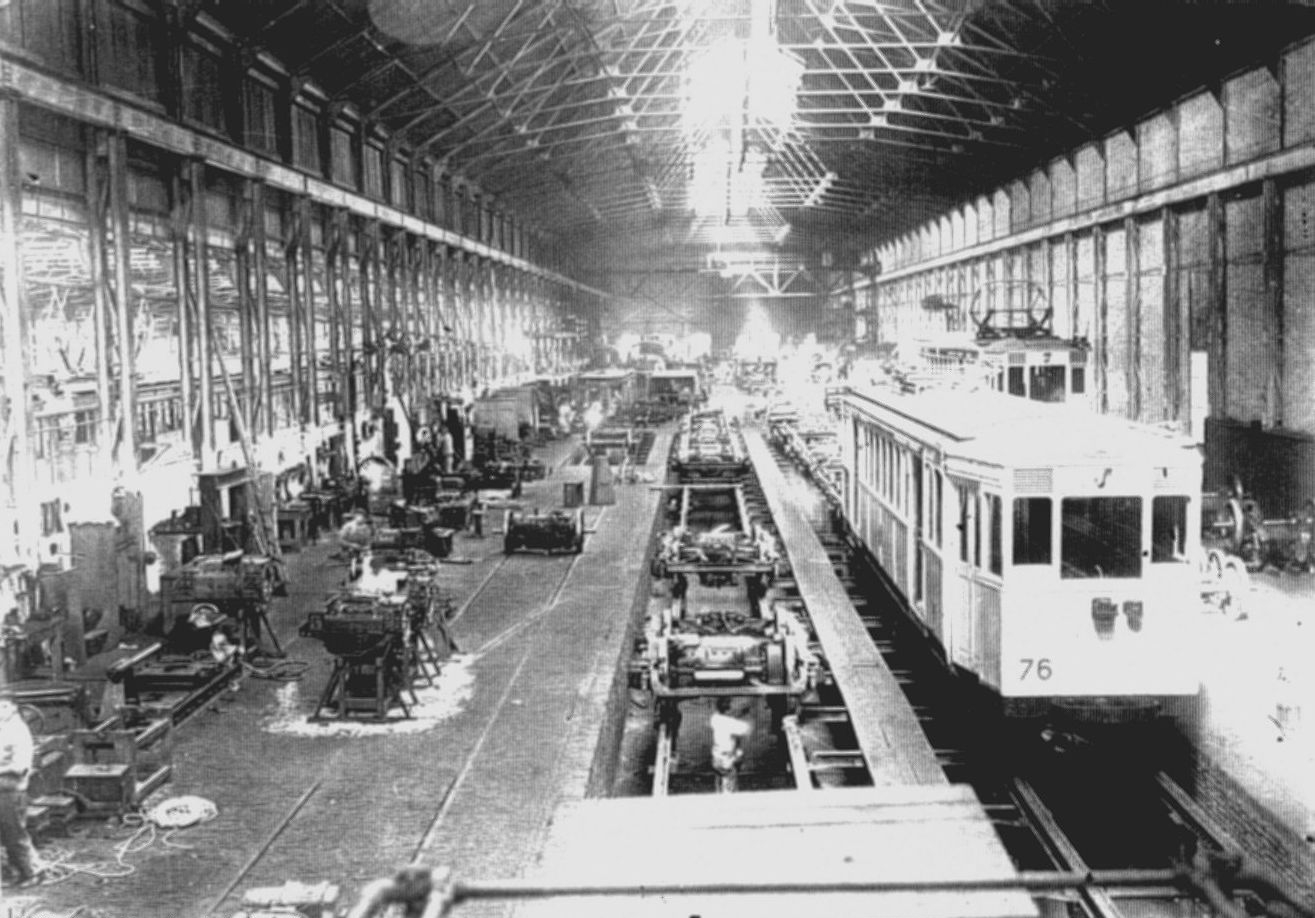
Interior of the workshop housing La Brugeoise cars (1913).

The workshop was built in 1914 by the Anglo-Argentine Tramways Company (AATC) to repair and house its underground tram network, which later became Line A of the Underground. At the same time, it also served the much of Buenos Aires' then vast tram network, albeit only the lines operated by AATC.

In 1980, the workshop became the headquarters of the AAT, who house and restore their growing collection of antique trams there. In 2008, the Buenos Aires City Legislature granted the workshop protection status as part of the city's national patrimony, which includes its rails and section of tunnel which join the workshop to Primera Junta station.

In recent years, the workshop - which had once also served - has had a diminishing role in the Underground following the construction of new workshops on Line D and Line E and is increasingly shifting its focus to its function within the AAT and on storing and refurbishing La Brugeoise cars.

== Gallery ==
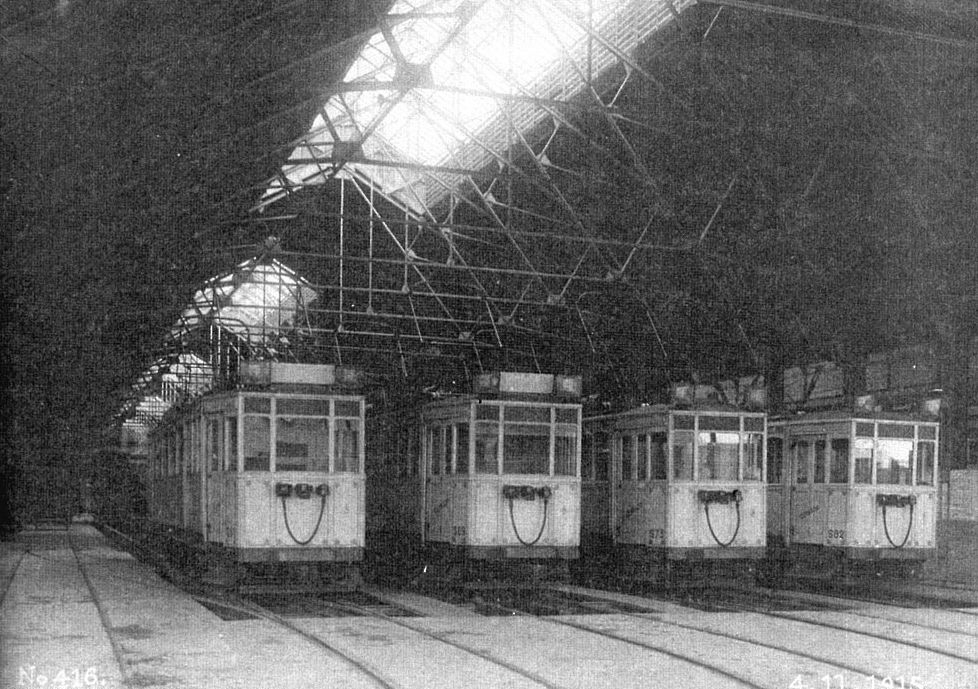
CTAA La Brugeoise cars before underground conversion (1913)

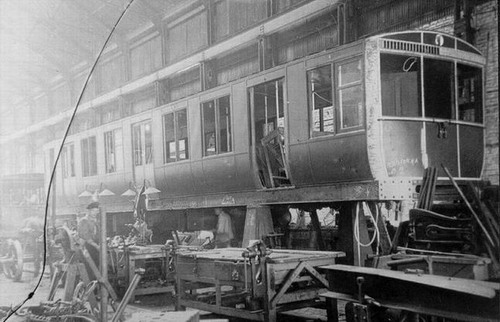
La Brugeoise cars being converted (1928)

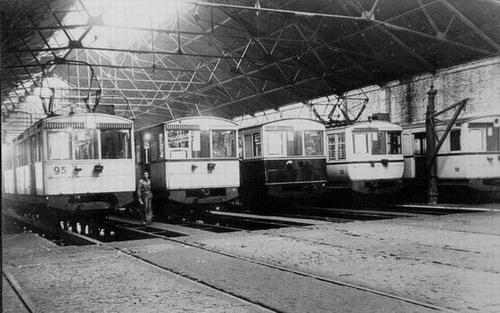
La Brugeoise cars after conversion (1939)

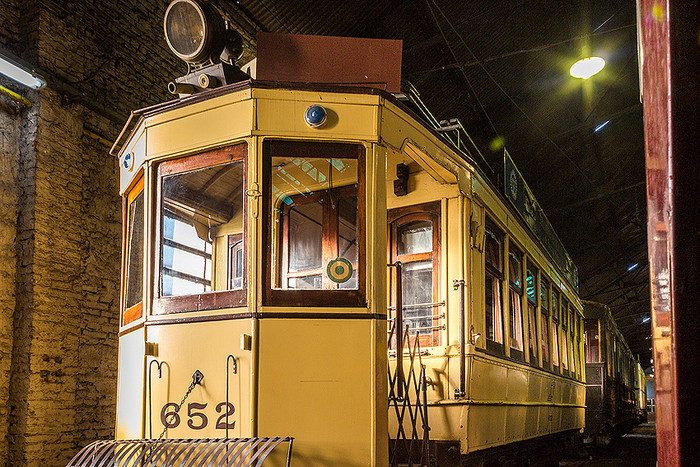
An AAT tram in the workshop

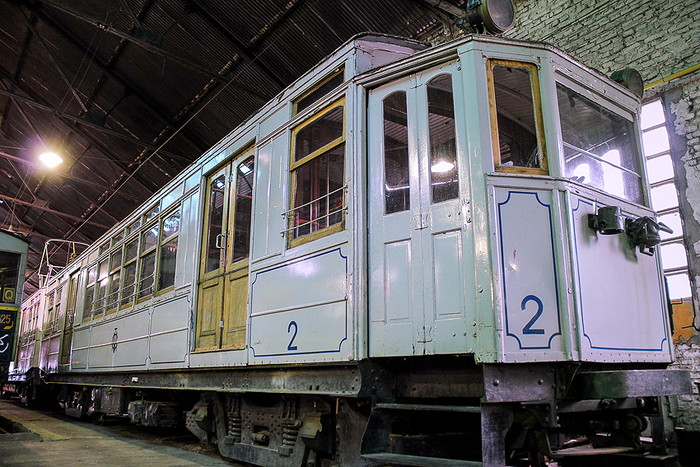
An AAT UEC Preston at the workshop

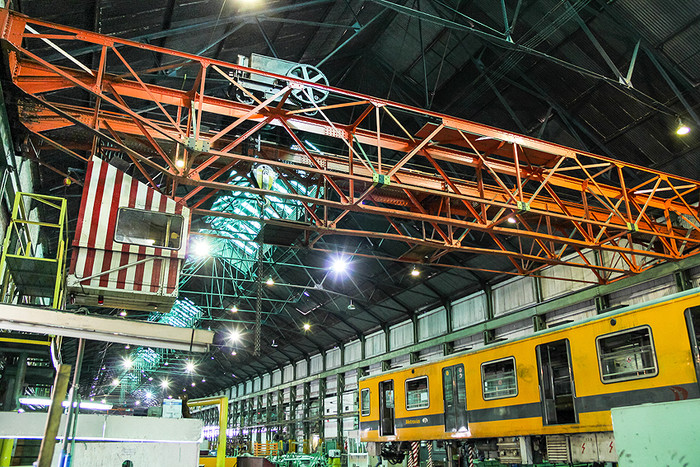
Current interior of the workshop

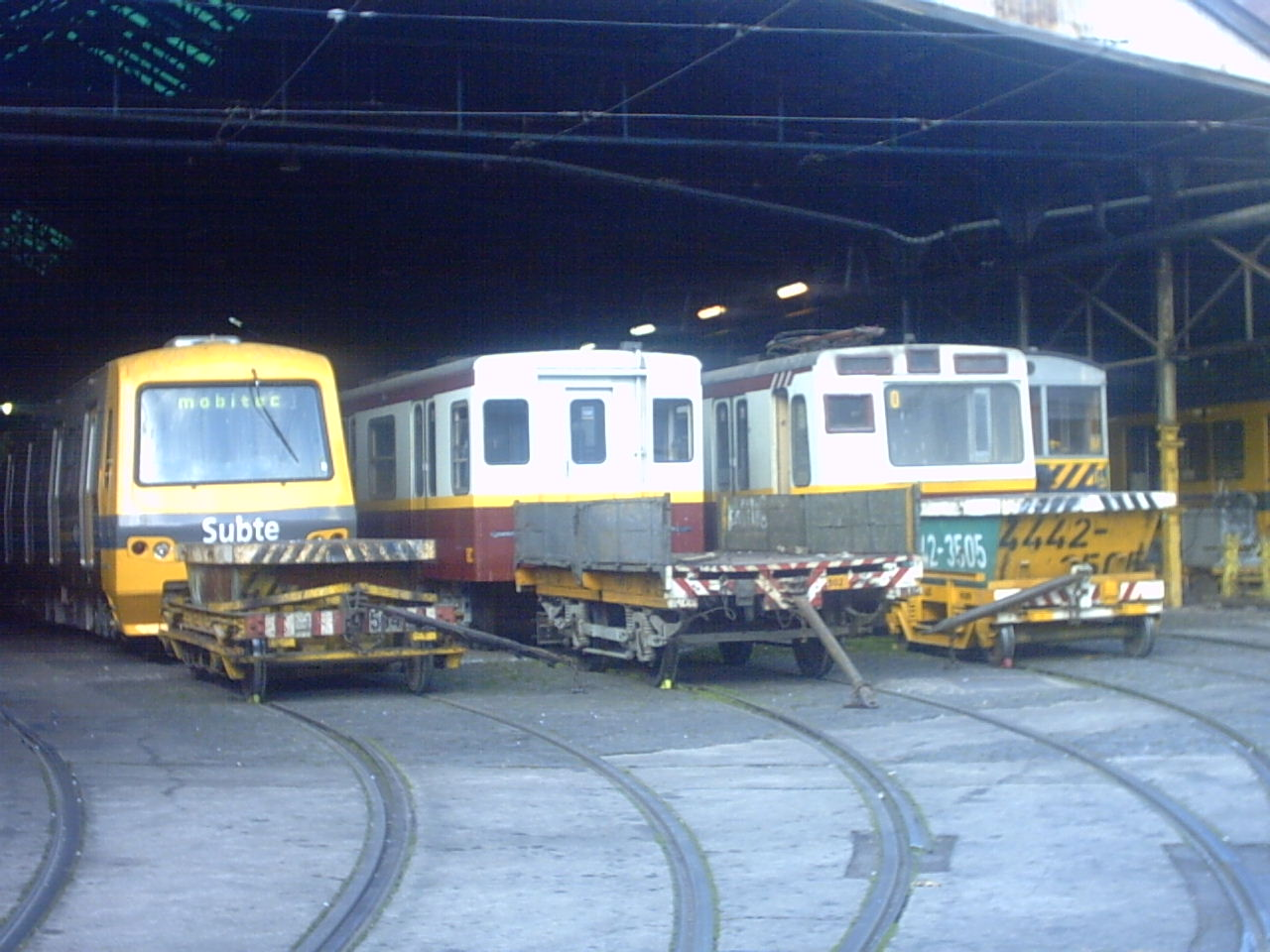
Defunct rolling stock next to current Line D Alstom train

== See also ==
- La Brugeoise cars
- Trams in Buenos Aires
- Anglo-Argentine Tramways Company
