= Palermo (Buenos Aires Underground) =

Buenos Aires Underground station

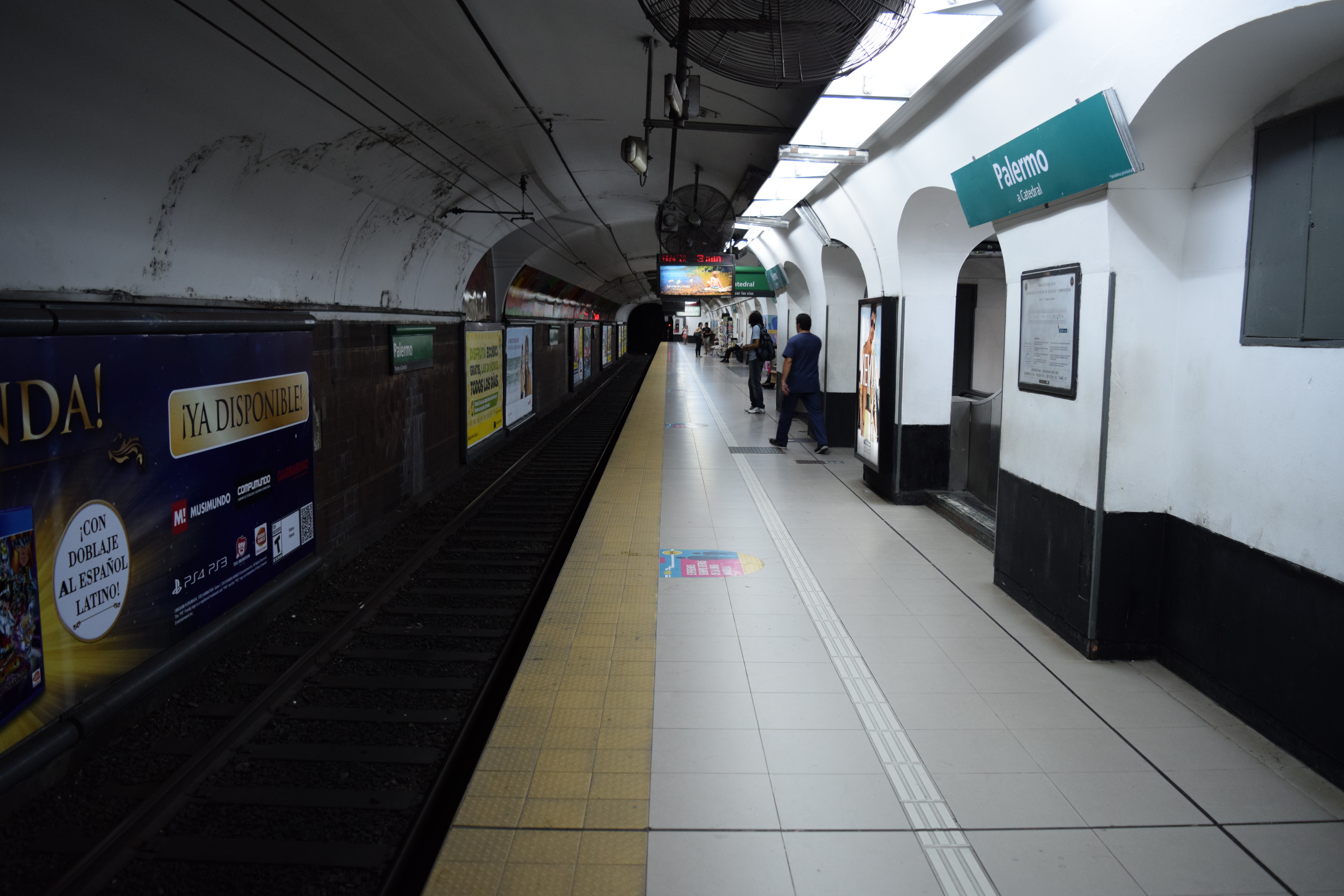

General information
- Location: Av. Santa Fe and Av. Juan B. Justo
- Coordinates: 34°34′42.6″S 58°25′32.4″W
- Platforms: Island platforms
- Connections: San Martín Line and

History
- Opened: 23 February 1940

Services
Preceding station	Buenos Aires Underground	Following station
Ministro Carranza towards Congreso de Tucumán	Line D	Plaza Italia towards Catedral
Location

Palermo is a station on Line D of the Buenos Aires Underground in Palermo, Buenos Aires. It is located at the intersection of Avenida Santa Fe and Godoy Cruz. The station was opened on 23 February 1940 as the western terminus of the extension of Line D from Tribunales. On 29 December 1987, the line was extended to Ministro Carranza.

It is a transfer point for the Metrobús that runs along Juan B. Justo avenue and Palermo station on the San Martín Line commuter rail service.

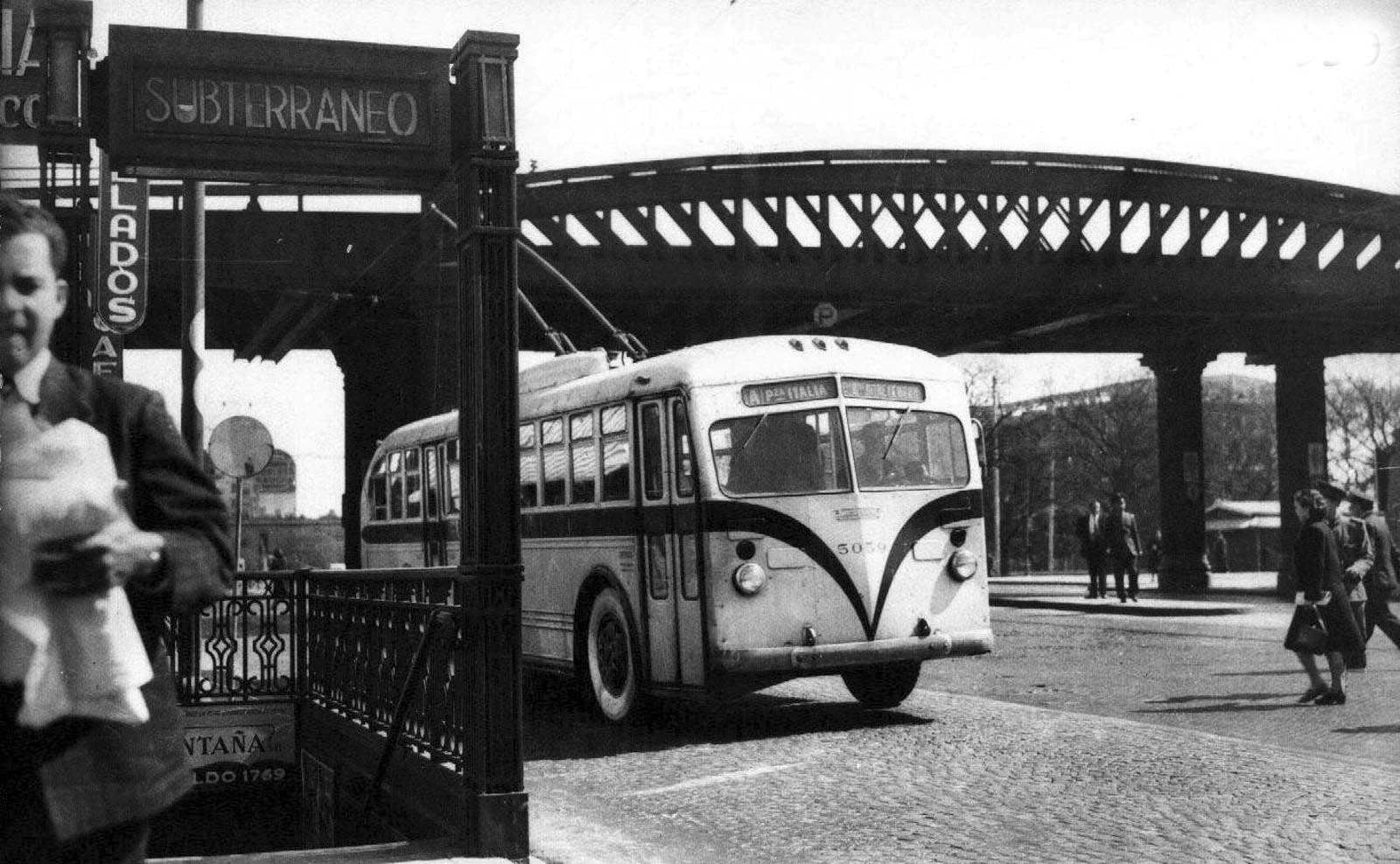
Palermo station ground level exit with trolleybus, and railway bridge in the background (1950)
