= Olleros (Buenos Aires Underground) =

Buenos Aires Underground station

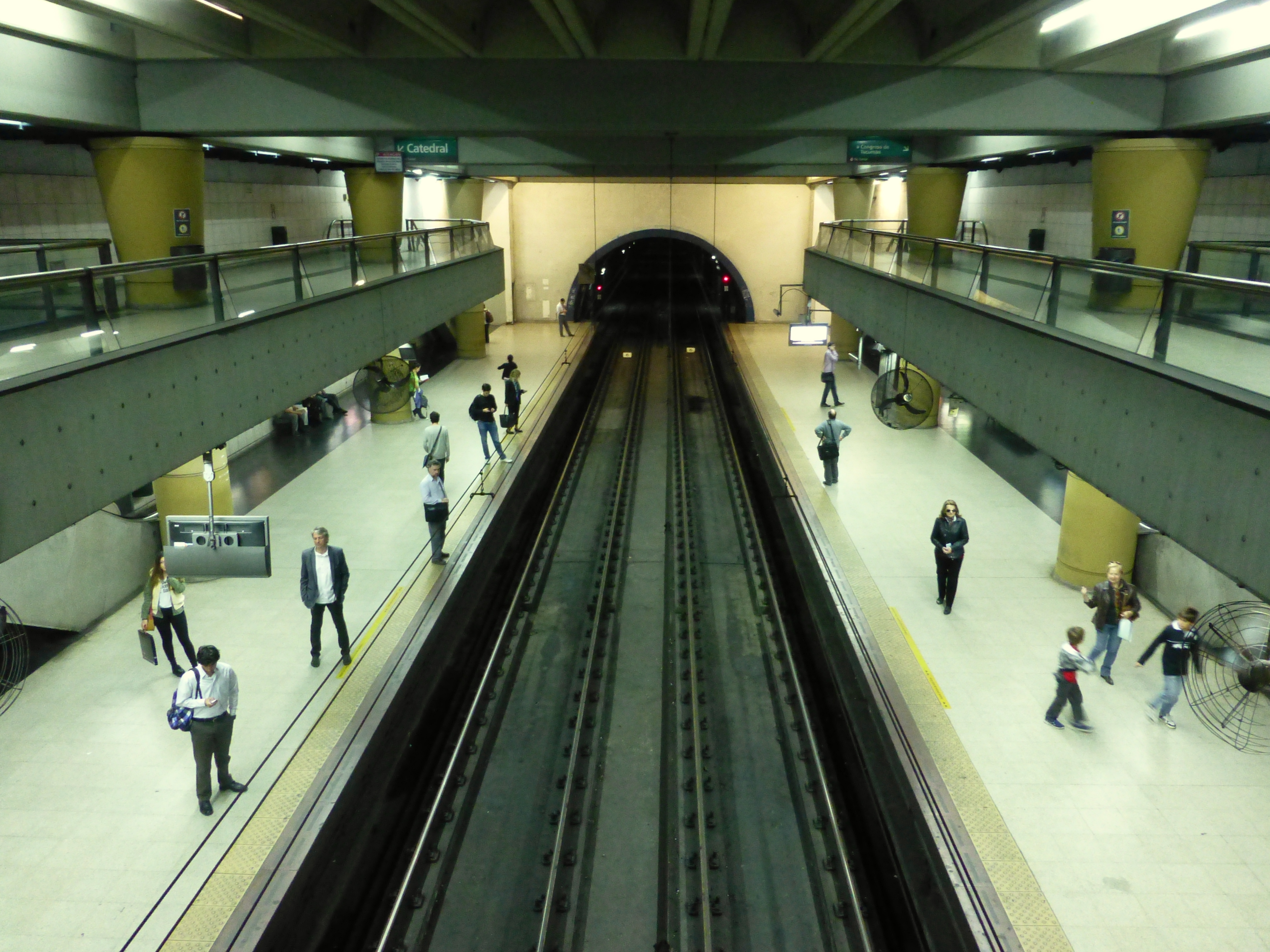
- Central view of the station platforms

General information
- Location: Av. Cabildo between Olleros and Av. F. Lacroze
- Coordinates: 34°34′12.3″S 58°26′40.7″W
- Platforms: Side platforms

History
- Opened: 31 May 1997

Services
Preceding station	Buenos Aires Underground	Following station
José Hernández towards Congreso de Tucumán	Line D	Ministro Carranza towards Catedral
Location

Olleros is a station on Line D of the Buenos Aires Underground. The station was opened on 31 May 1997 as part of the extension of the line from Ministro Carranza to José Hernández.
