= José Hernández (Buenos Aires Underground) =

Buenos Aires Underground station

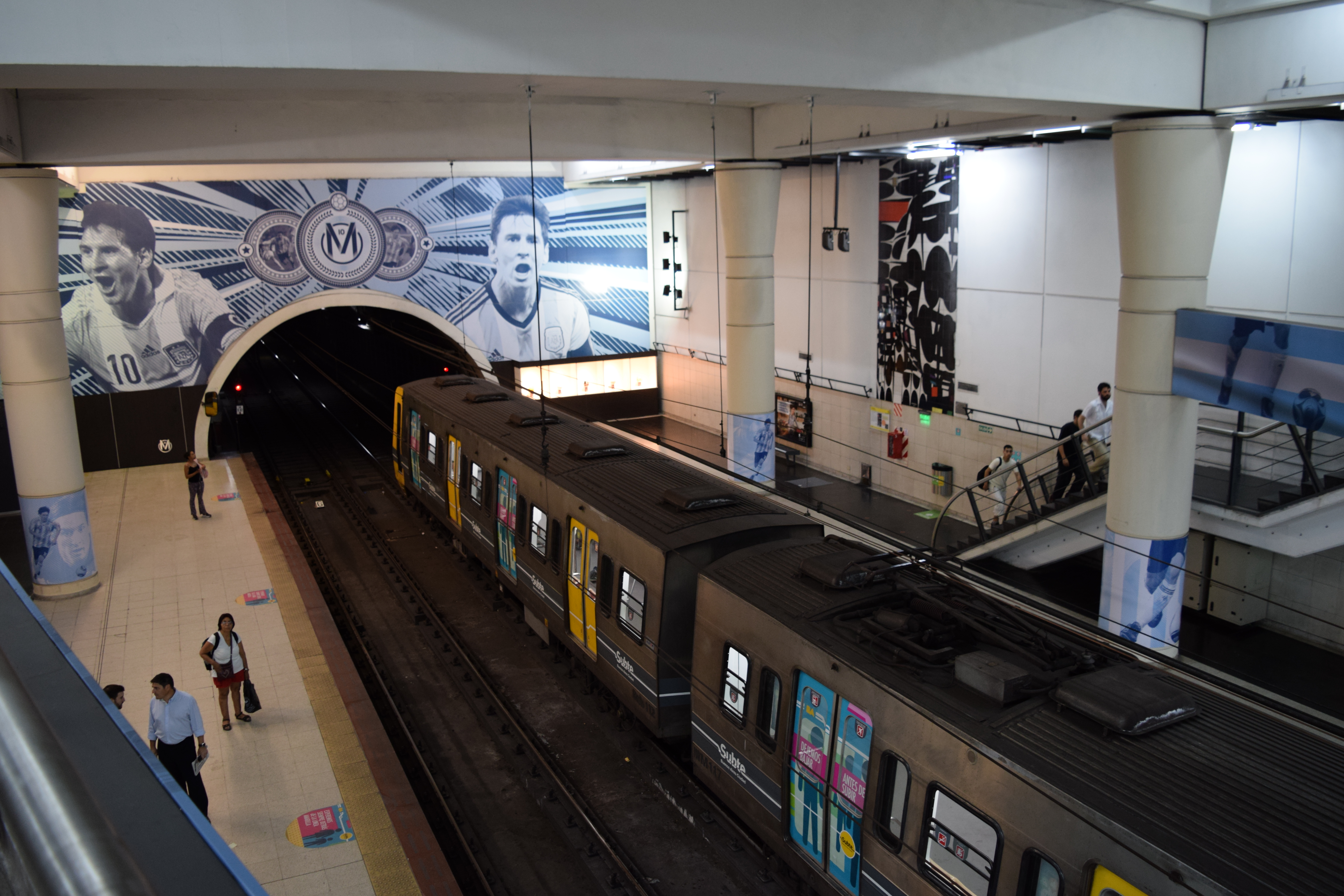

General information
- Location: Av. Cabildo and Virrey del Pino
- Coordinates: 34°33′58.4″S 58°27′7.8″W
- Platforms: Side platforms

History
- Opened: 13 November 1997

Services
Preceding station	Buenos Aires Underground	Following station
Juramento towards Congreso de Tucumán	Line D	Olleros towards Catedral
Location

José Hernández is a station on Line D of the Buenos Aires Underground. The station was opened on 31 May 1997 as the western terminus of the extension of the line from Ministro Carranza. On 21 June 1999 the line was extended further west to Juramento.
