= Ministro Carranza (Buenos Aires Underground) =

Buenos Aires Underground station

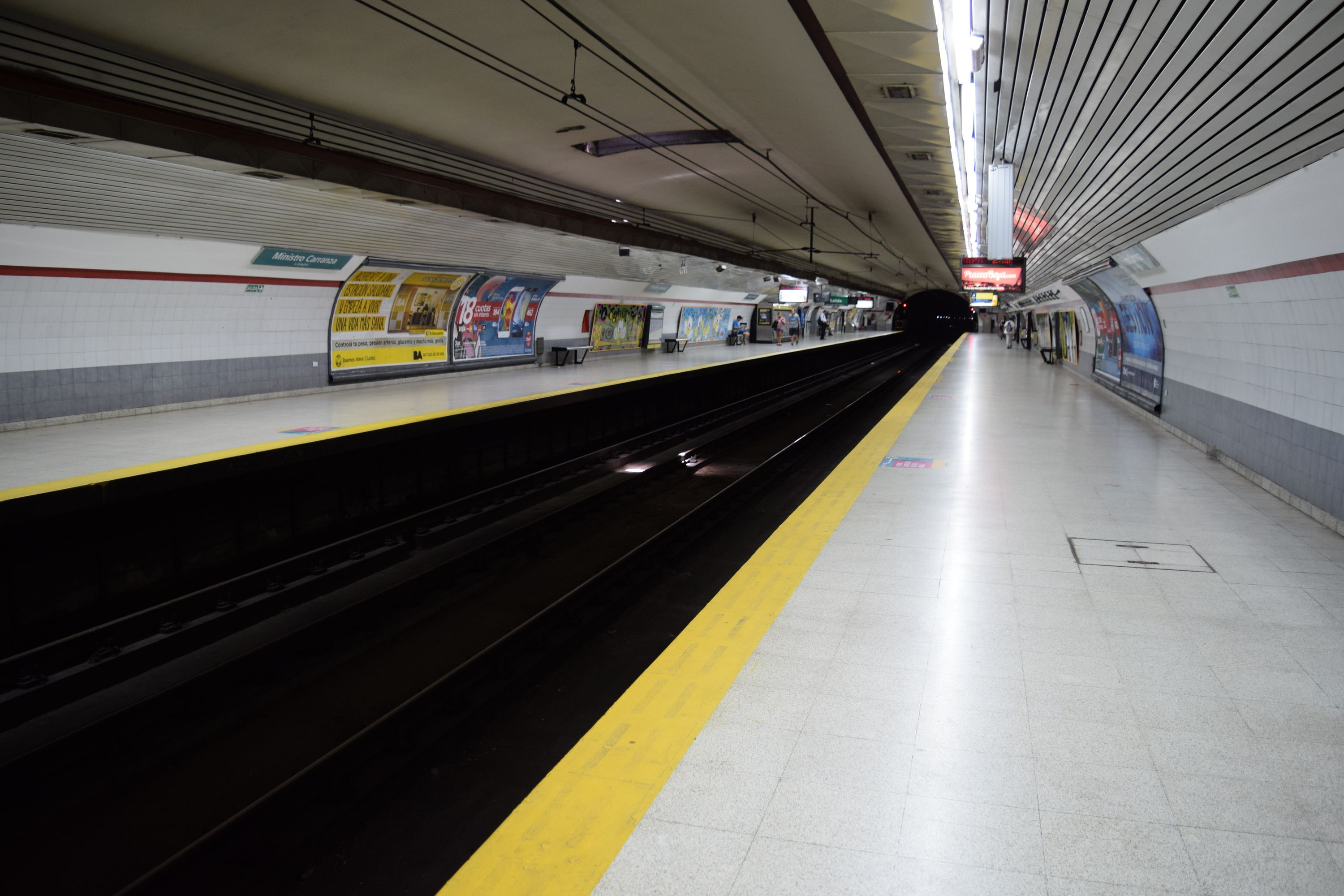

General information
- Location: Av. Santa Fe and Av. Dorrego
- Coordinates: 34°34′31.4″S 58°26′5.6″W
- Platforms: Side platforms
- Connections: Mitre Line

History
- Opened: 29 December 1987

Services
Preceding station	Buenos Aires Underground	Following station
Olleros towards Congreso de Tucumán	Line D	Palermo towards Catedral
Location

Ministro Carranza is a station on Line D of the Buenos Aires Underground. It connects with Ministro Carranza station on the Mitre Line commuter rail service. The station was opened on 29 December 1987 as the western terminus of the extension of Line D from Palermo. On 31 May 1997, the line was extended to José Hernández.
