= Juramento (Buenos Aires Underground) =

Buenos Aires Underground station

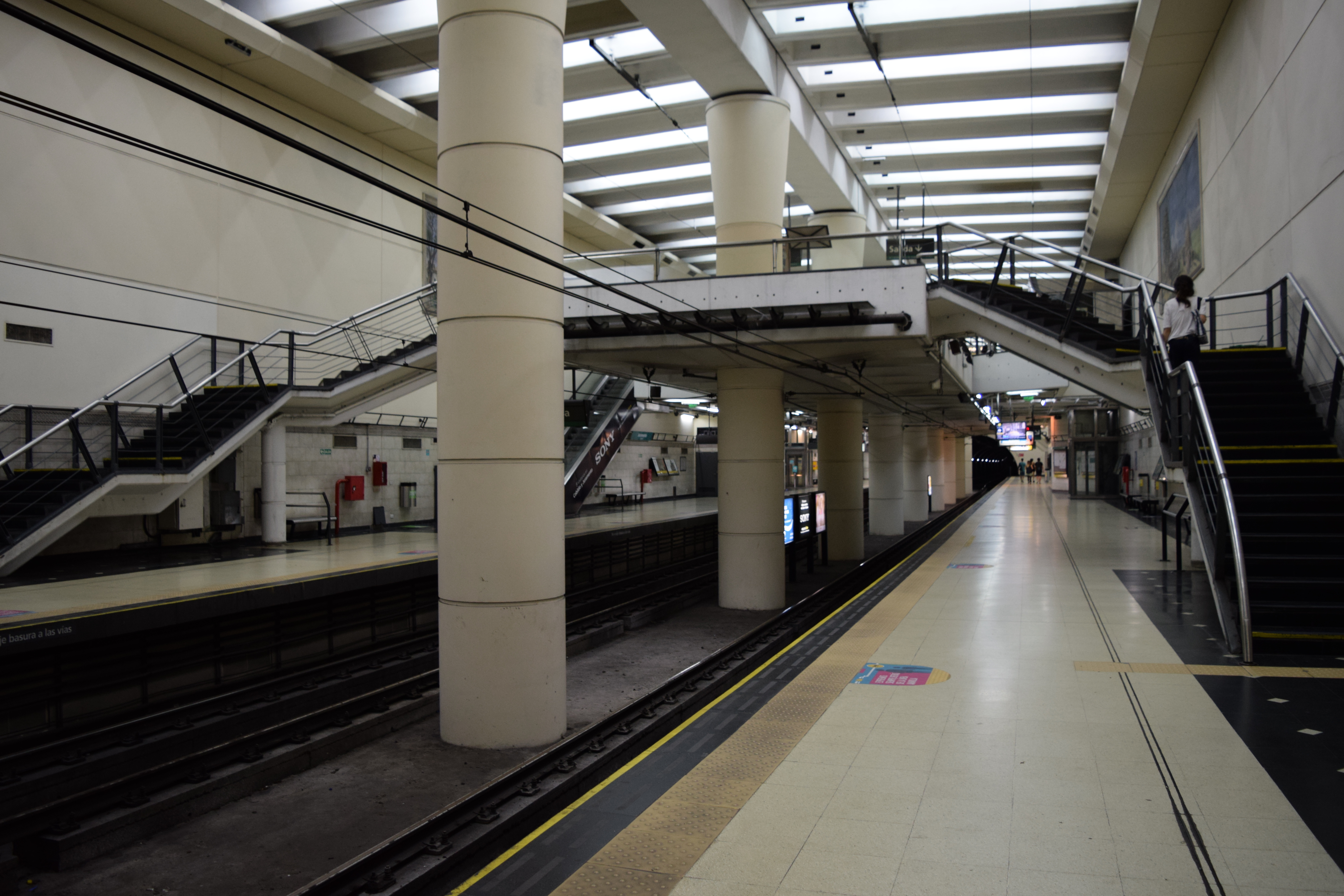

General information
- Location: Av. Cabildo, between Av. Juramento and Echeverría
- Coordinates: 34°33′44″S 58°27′23.5″W
- Platforms: Side platforms

History
- Opened: 21 June 1999

Services
Preceding station	Buenos Aires Underground	Following station
Congreso de Tucumán Terminus	Line D	José Hernández towards Catedral
Location

Juramento is a station on Line D of the Buenos Aires Underground. It is located at the intersection of Cabildo and Juramento avenues. The station was opened on 21 June 1999 as the western terminus of the extension of the line from José Hernández. On 27 April 2000, the line was extended further west to Congreso de Tucumán.
