= Buenos Aires Underground 100 Series =

Rolling stock of the Buenos Aires Underground

100 Series
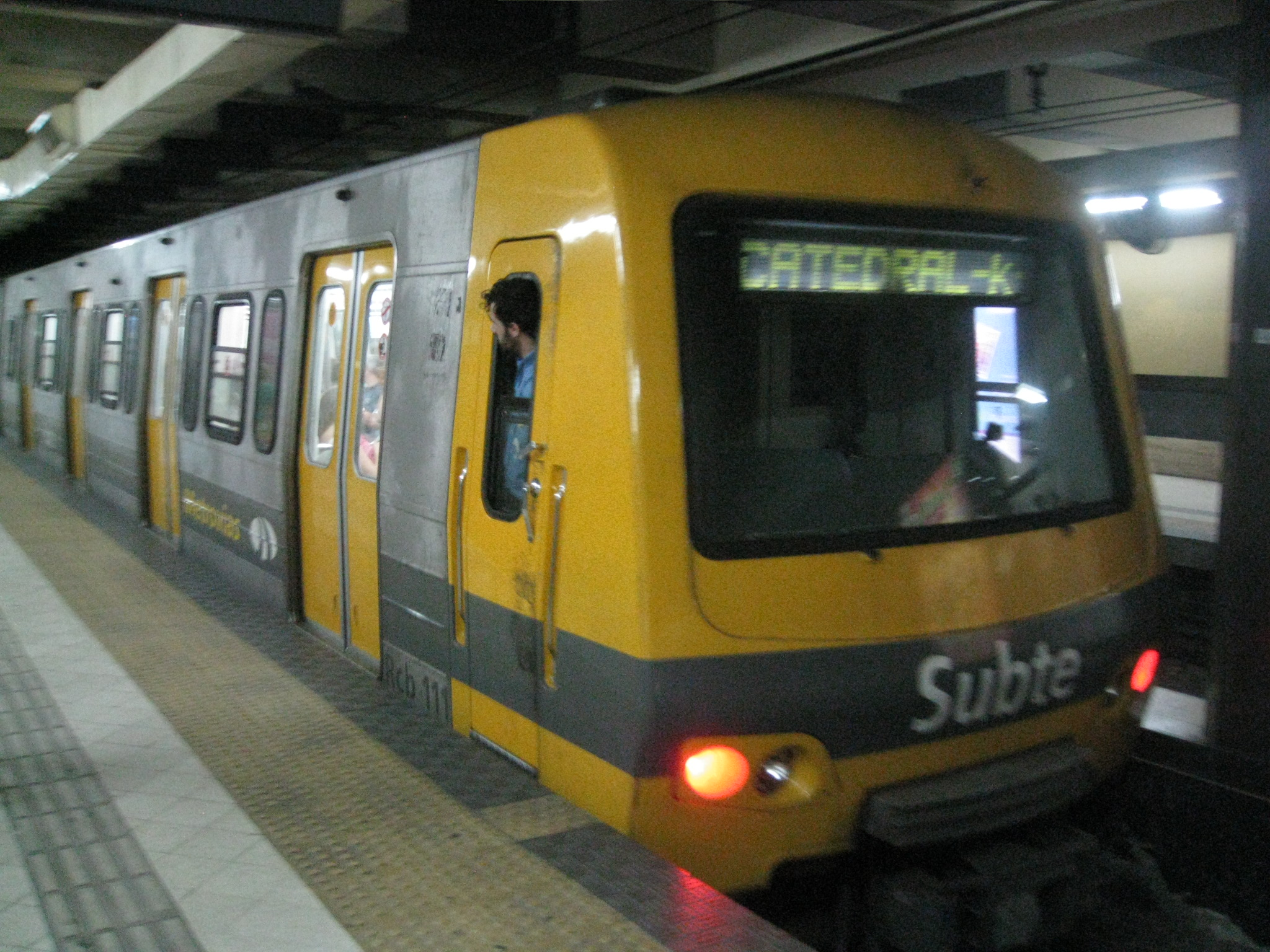
- A 100 Series train on Line D, before mid-life refurbishment
- In service: 2001-Present
- Manufacturer: Alstom
- Family name: Alstom Metropolis
- Replaced: La Brugeoise cars Siemens O&K; Caf Gee
- Constructed: 2001-2005, 2009
- Entered service: 2001
- Refurbished: 2015
- Number built: 96
- Number in service: 96
- Formation: 6 cars per trainset
- Operator: Buenos Aires Underground

Specifications
- Car body construction: Stainless steel
- Doors: 4 per side
- Traction system: Alstom ONIX 1500; IGBT-VVVF
- Track gauge: 1,435 mm (4 ft 8 1/2 in) standard gauge

The 100 Series are a series of underground railway cars manufactured by Alstom in Brazil and Argentina for use on the Buenos Aires Underground. They are used on Line D of the network, serving alongside some 300 Series and formerly Fiat-Materfer cars. Since 2019, some units have also been used on Line E.

== History ==
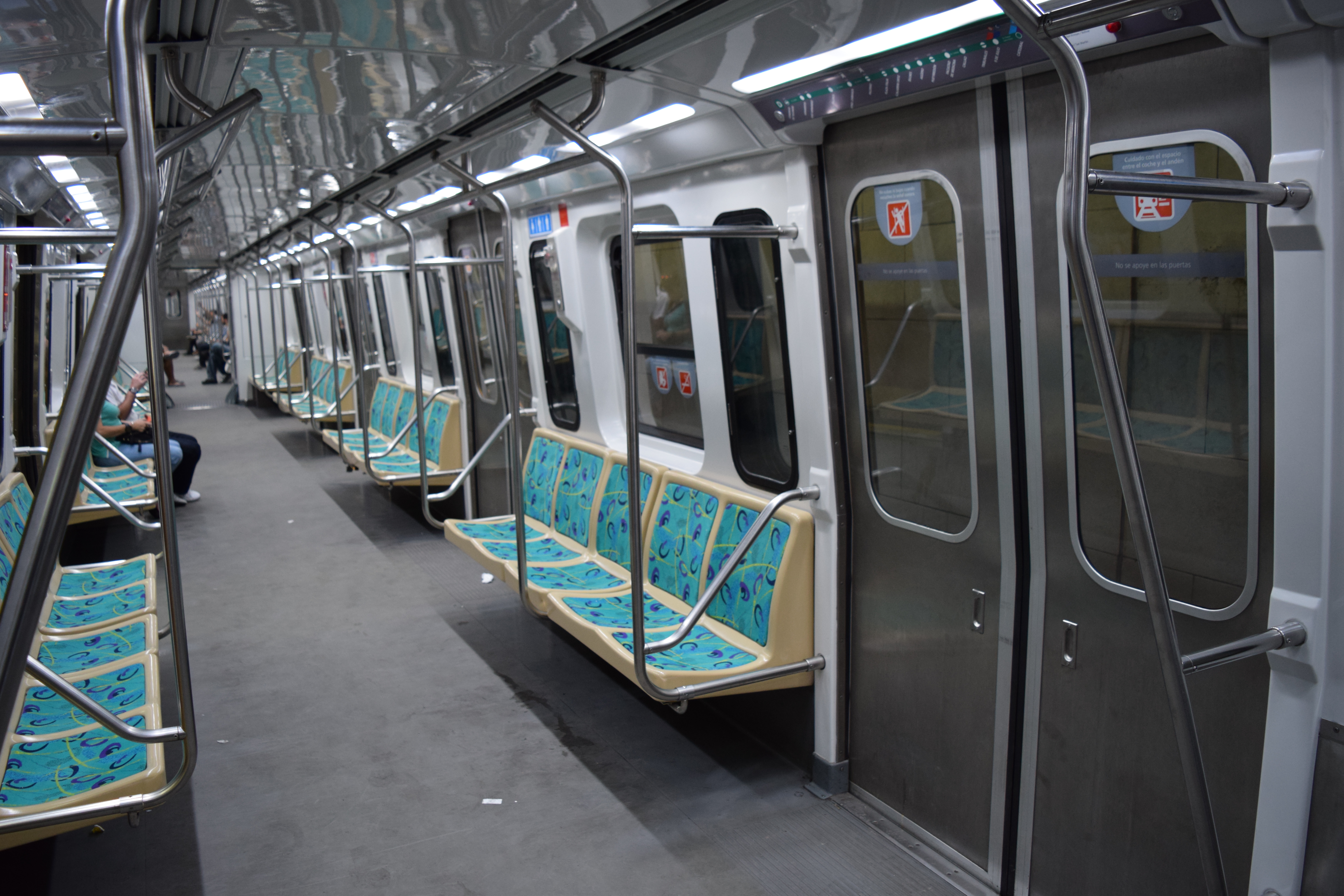
Interior of a 100 Series car after refurbishment

The 100 Series was initially purchased for use on Line A to replace the ageing La Brugeoise cars. However, they ended up replacing the slightly newer Siemens-Schuckert Orenstein & Koppel cars, which were allocated to Line D instead.

Originally, the purchase consisted of 80 cars for a total of 16 trains made up of 5 cars each, due to the shorter platform length on Line A. However, 16 more 100 Series cars were purchased up until 2009, making a total of 96 cars and allowing each train to have 6 cars, making full use of the line's platforms.

In 2015, the cars began to receive a mid-life refurbishment, primarily to add air conditioning, but also incorporating enhancements to the interior. This included improved lighting and new upholstery. Despite enjoying a successful service life, they are also the noisiest cars on the network.

Between 2017 and 2019, New Alstom 300 Series cars replaced the Fiat-Materfer cars and served alongside the existing 100 Series cars. By 2022, Alstom has signed three new maintenance contracts in Argentina to ensure the safety and accessibility of the transit's track, signal systems, tunnels, bridges, vehicles, and stations. The project is expected to take 19 months, with its operation set on Line E once completed. In 2024, Line D was adapted to use communications-based train control (CBTC) signalling, requiring the adaptation of its fleet to interface with the new system.

== See also ==
- Buenos Aires Underground rolling stock
- Alstom Metropolis
- Buenos Aires Underground 200 Series
- Buenos Aires Underground 300 Series
