= Line D (Buenos Aires Underground) =

Rapid transit line of Buenos Aires

Line D

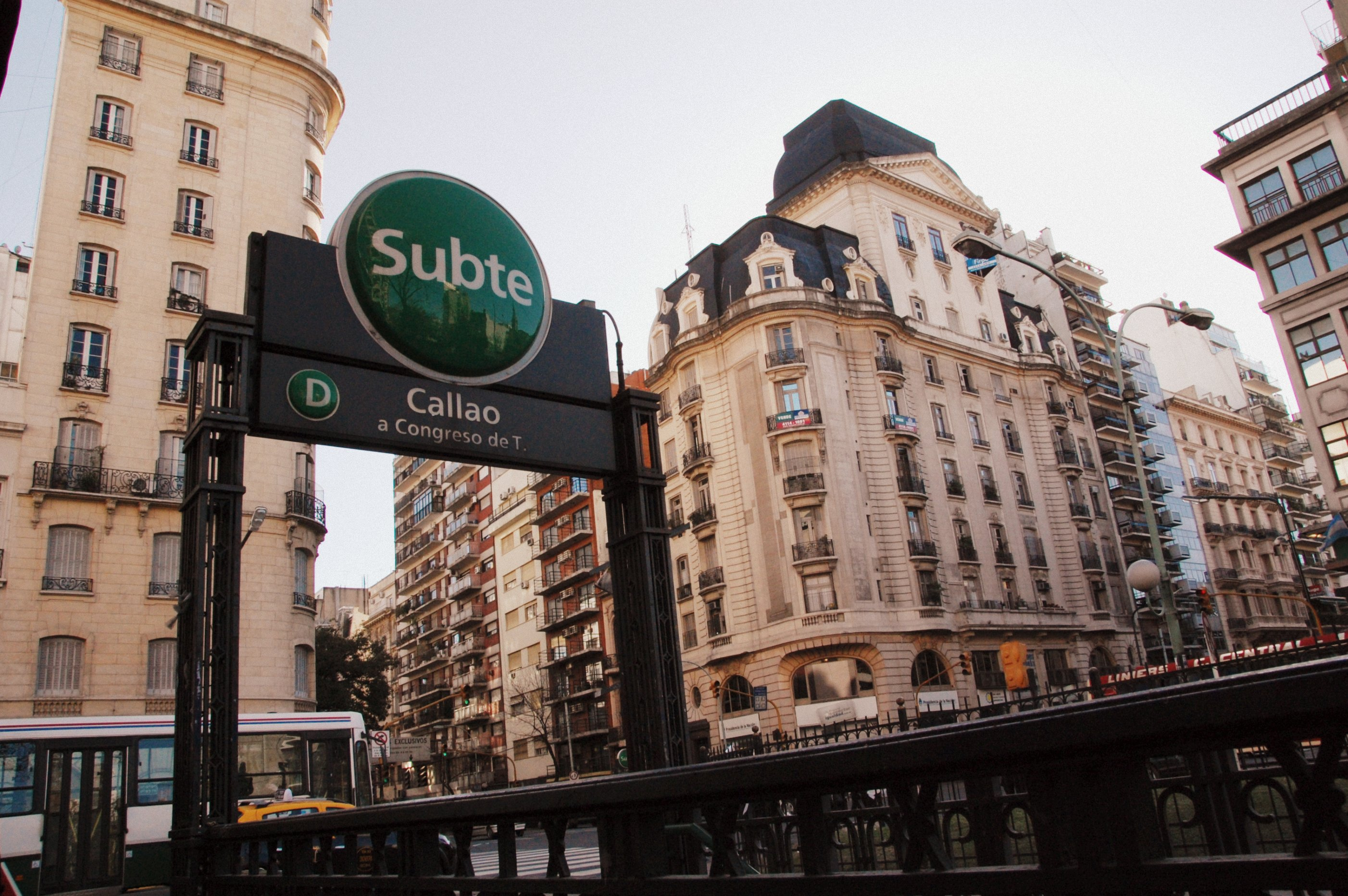
- Entrance to Callao station

Overview
- Termini: Catedral; Congreso de Tucumán
- Stations: 16

Service
- Type: Rapid transit
- System: Buenos Aires Underground
- Operator: Emova
- Rolling stock: 100 series · 300 series
- Daily ridership: 96,279 (2024)

History
- Opened: 3 June 1937; 89 years ago
- Last extension: 2000

Technical
- Line length: 11 km (6.8 mi)
- Character: Underground
- Track gauge: 1,435 mm (4 ft 8 1/2 in)
- Electrification: Overhead line, 1,500 V DC

Line D of the Buenos Aires Underground runs from Catedral to Congreso de Tucumán. The line opened on 3 June 1937 and has been expanded to the north several times. The line is currently 11 km long and has 16 stations, while running approximately parallel to the city's coastline.

Line D map

== History ==
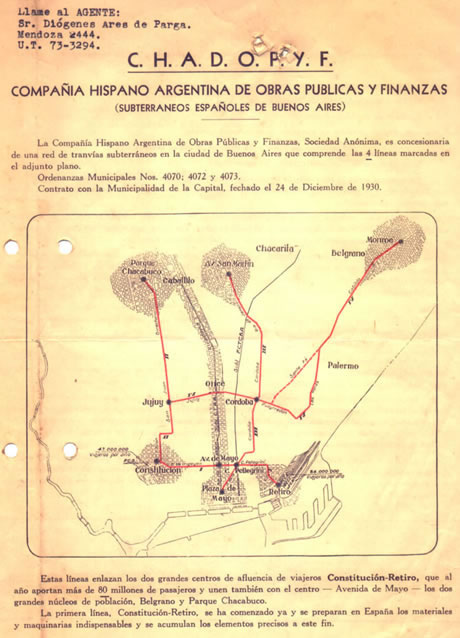
The original plans for Line D were similar to those of Line G.

Line D was the second line to be built by the Compañía Hispano Argentina de Obras Públicas y Finanzas (CHADOPyF, Hispanic-Argentine Company for Public Works and Finances), following the construction of Line C in 1934. Construction began in 1935 and the first part of the line was inaugurated in 1937 and ran 1.7 km from Catedral (still the current terminus) to Tribunales. Three years later, the section which brought the line to Plaza Italia in Palermo was completed, bringing the length of the line to 6.5 km.

The line was not properly extended until 1993 when it was extended to Ministro Caranza, a station named after the Radical politician. Further extensions occurred in the 1990s, beginning in 1997 with the opening of Olleros and José Hernández, then Juramento in 1999, and finally Congreso de Tucumán in 2000, where it currently terminates.

Over the decades it has been discussed numerous times whether to extend the line out to the limits of the city proper. The last of these proposals came forward in 2002 which would have seen an additional two stations added to the line. However, this was later abandoned since the line was already at full capacity after the opening of Congreso de Tucumán station. In June 2015 the Metrobus Cabildo line opened, connecting Line D from its terminus at Congreso de Tucumán to Vicente López district in Greater Buenos Aires, some kilometres away from the city limits, overlapping any theoretical extension of Line D. Line D is the only line in the network which will not be extended as part of the most recent expansion plan.

The line was closed for two months during the summer of 2024 to upgrade the signal system. However, after the update, the frequency was actually worse and the waiting time ceased to be shown on the stations.

Until the privatisation of the underground in the 1990s, Line D was identified by the red colour; whilst Line B used green.

== Museum Stations ==
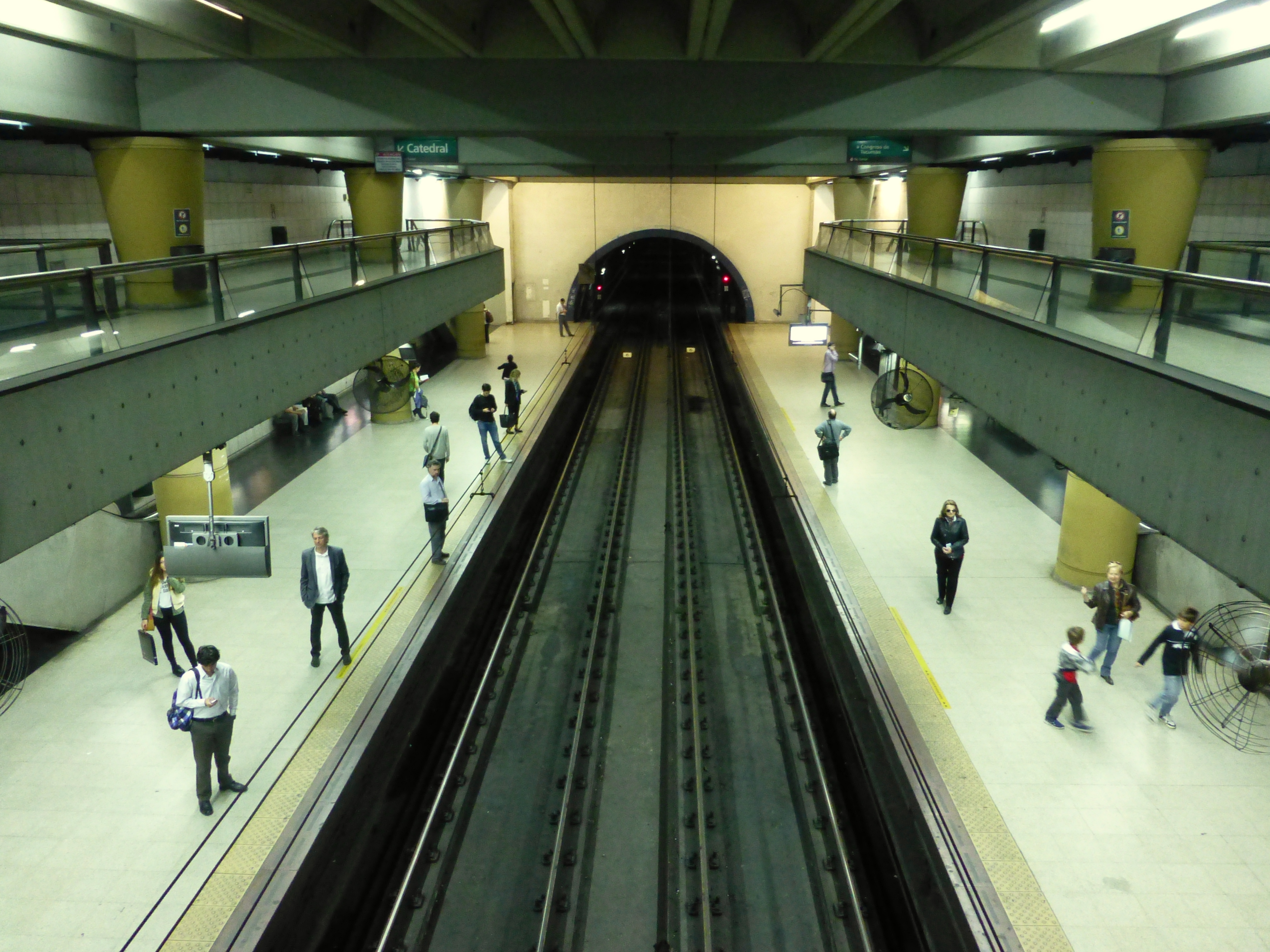
Olleros station platforms

Cultural activities occur at the Line D Juramento, Congreso de Tucumán and Olleros stations. These stations can be visited to see the exhibitions provided by the city's and national museums, education institutions and other civil society organisations.

“The stated aim of these museum stations is to use the subway network to make the city’s cultural and historical heritage more widely known. Museums and other institutions can use the stations for exhibitions free of charge.”

== Rolling stock ==
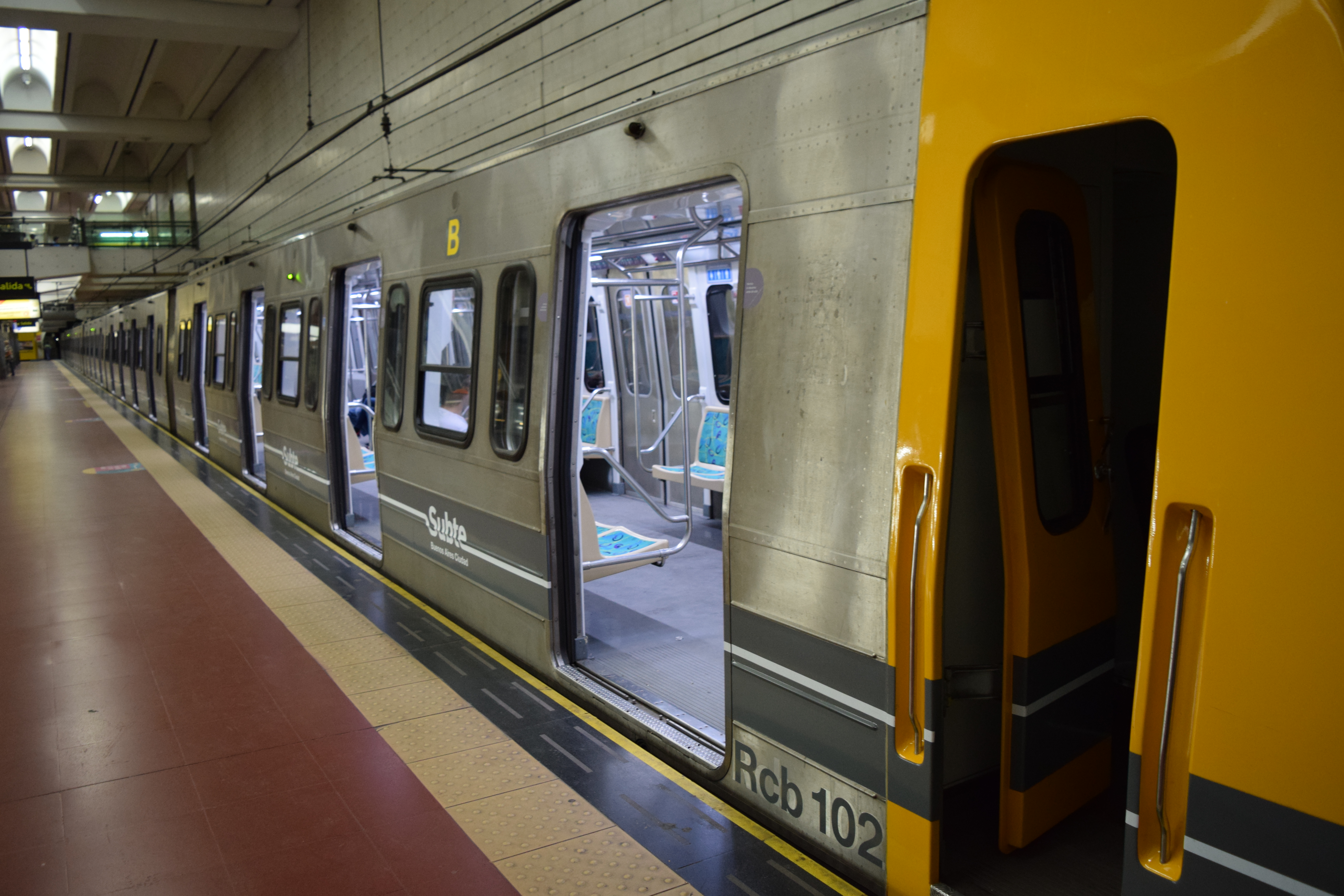
Buenos Aires Underground 100 Series rolling stock

Line D was originally served by Siemens-Schuckert Orenstein & Koppel rail rolling stock, and then by CAF cars. In 1999, cars from the Nagoya Municipal Subway were purchased second hand from Japan and used on the line. In 2001, numerous Alstom Metropolis 100 Series cars were purchased and built in Brazil and Argentina with the intention of incorporating them into Line A, however they were ultimately put into service on Line D. More 100 Series cars were purchased up until 2009, making a total of 96 cars. Since 2019, much of the fleet was transferred to Line E to serve alongside the Fiat Materfer cars on that line. The Alstom 100 fleet has been suspended on Line D since the 2024 January-March shutdown, as they do not yet have the capability to operate under CBTC signalling.

The remaining Nagoya cars were moved to Line C in 2007 and replaced with the 100 Series cars and with Fiat-Materfer cars. To make the rolling stock more uniform, 24 more modern 300 Series Alstom Metropolis cars were ordered in 2013 to replace the Materfer cars on the line, which meant that the line was entirely composed of 120 Alstom cars. In September 2015, at a conference in Brazil, the head of SBASE gave a presentation in which the number of new cars to be purchased for the line was 84 instead of 30. By 2016, the final figure had been fixed at 60 new cars, which meant that the line had 156 Alstom Metropolis cars by 2017. The 300 Series cars now make up the entirety of Line D's fleet.

=== Former ===
- Siemens-Schuckert Orenstein & Koppel (1937-1980)
- Caf General Electric (1964-2004)
- 250/300/1200 Series (1999-2007)
- Fiat-Materfer (1980-2018)

=== Present ===
- 100 Series (2001-Present)
- 300 Series (2018-Present)

== Gallery ==
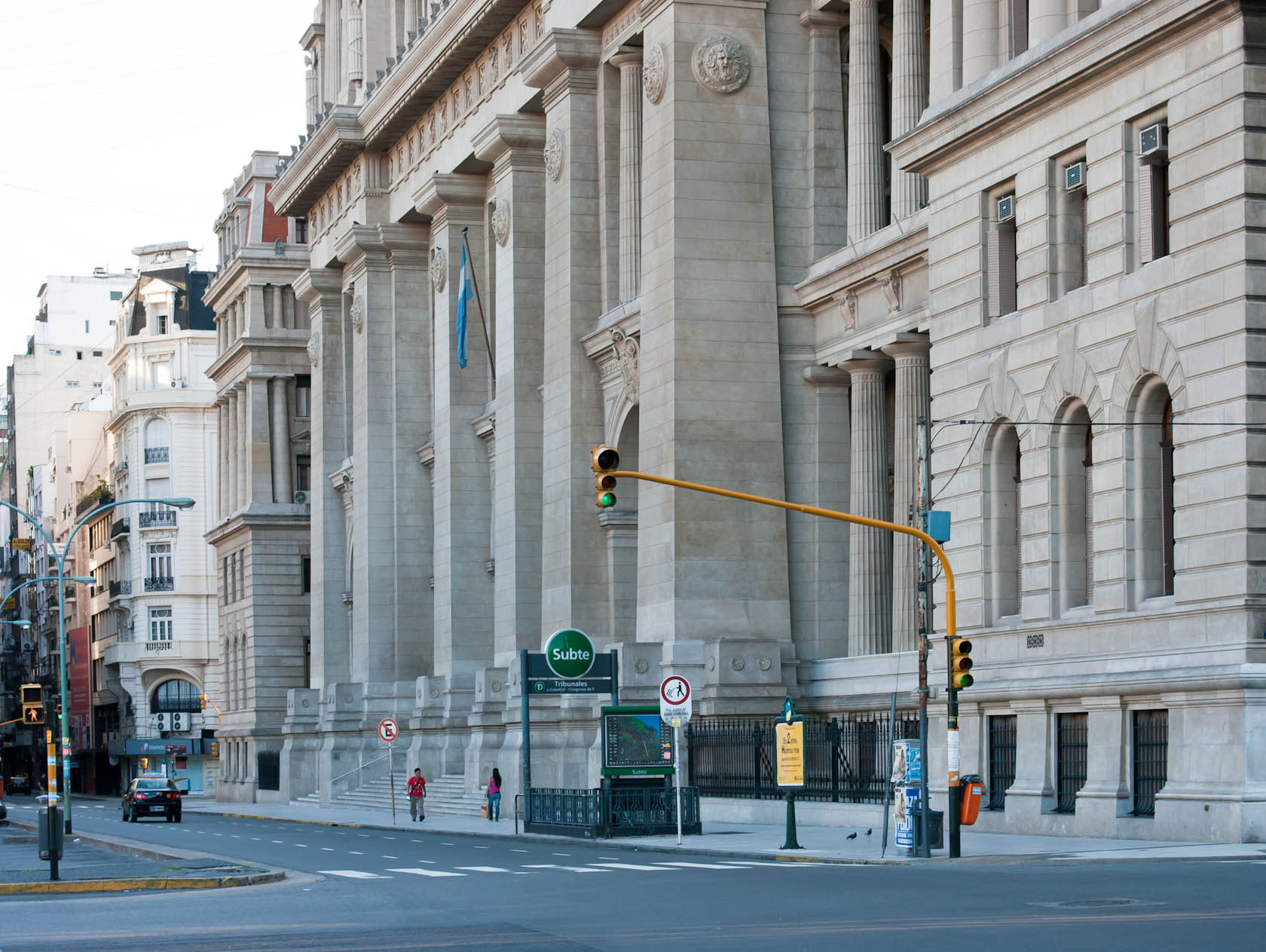
Tribunales station entrance

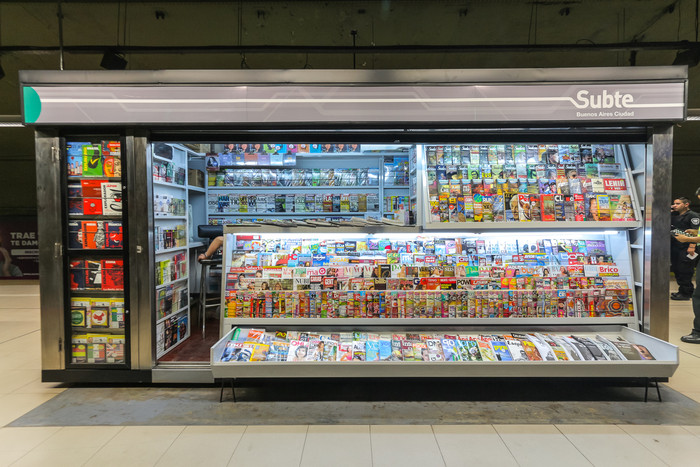
A magazine stand at Plaza Italia station

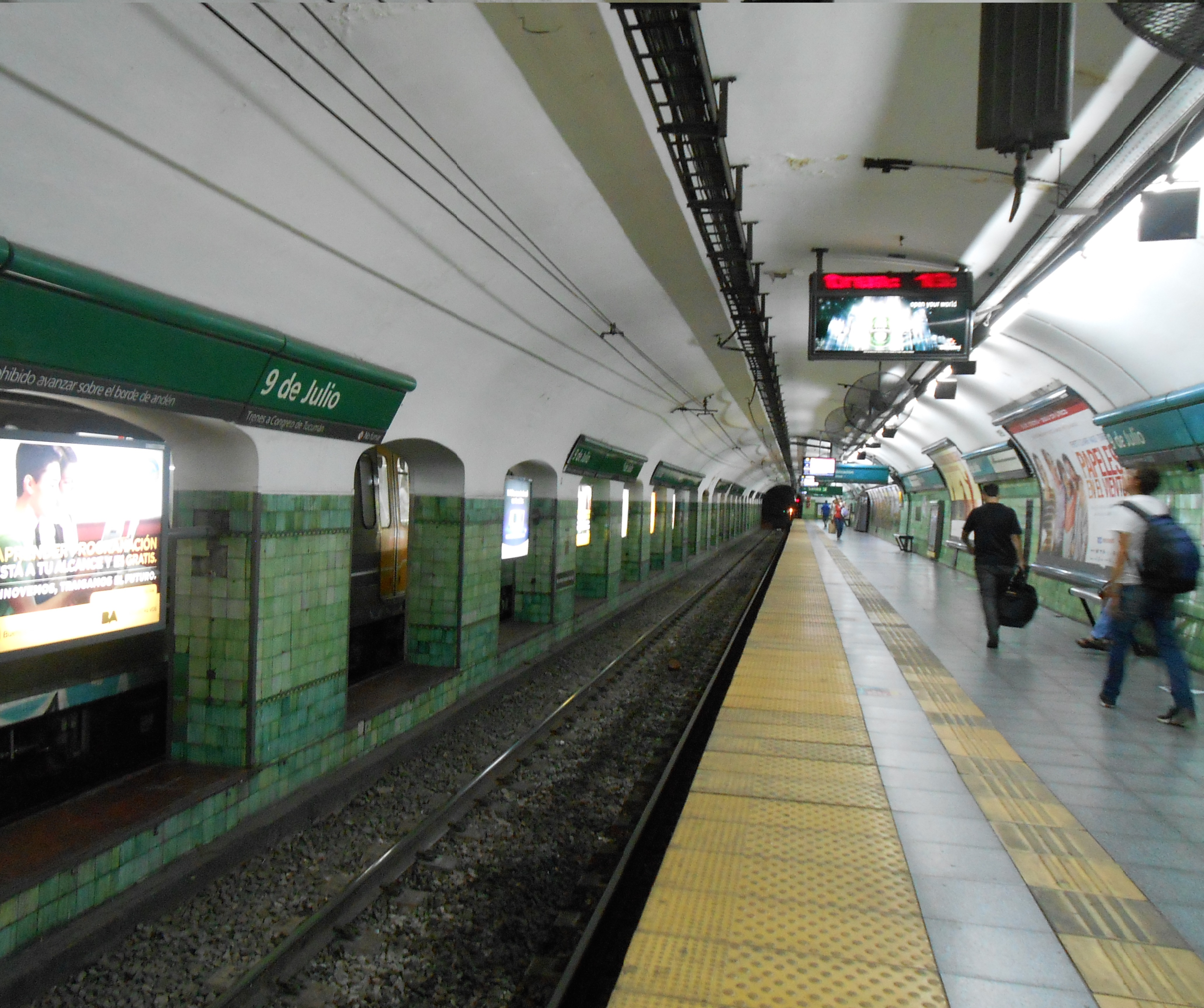
9 de Julio station

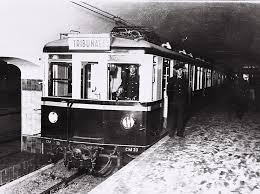
Siemens O&K at the inauguration of Line D (1937)

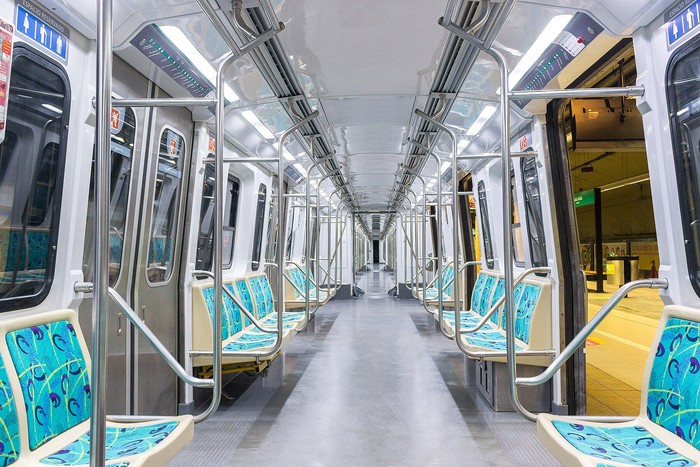
Interior of 100 Series rolling stock

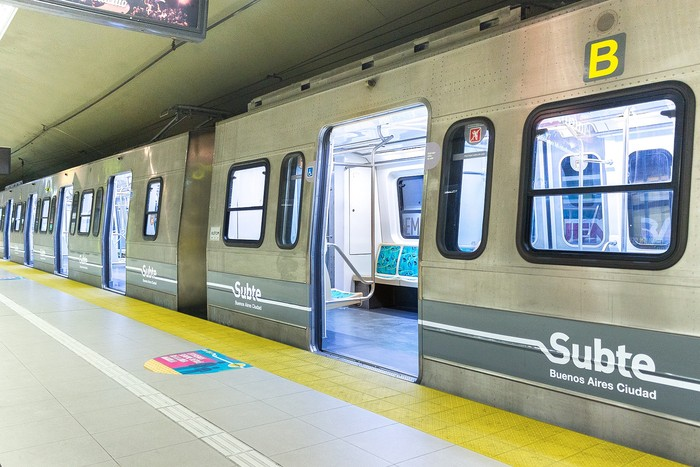
Alstom train
