= Avenida Juan B. Justo =

Avenue in Buenos Aires, Argentina

Coordinates: 34.6135°S 58.4718°W

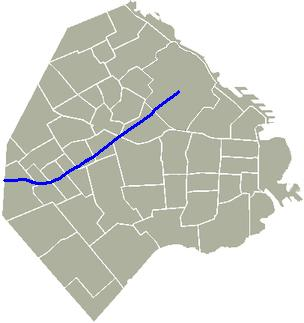
Location of Avenida Juan B. Justo in Buenos Aires.

Avenida Juan B. Justo is an avenue that runs through Palermo and Recoleta neighborhoods of Buenos Aires, Argentina, and goes from southwest to northeast, parallel Pueyrredón avenue. It starts at Santa Fe avenue, and ends at Avenida General Paz.

Throughout its route passes the first Metrobus of the city. The avenue was so named in honor of Juan B. Justo.

== Metrobus ==
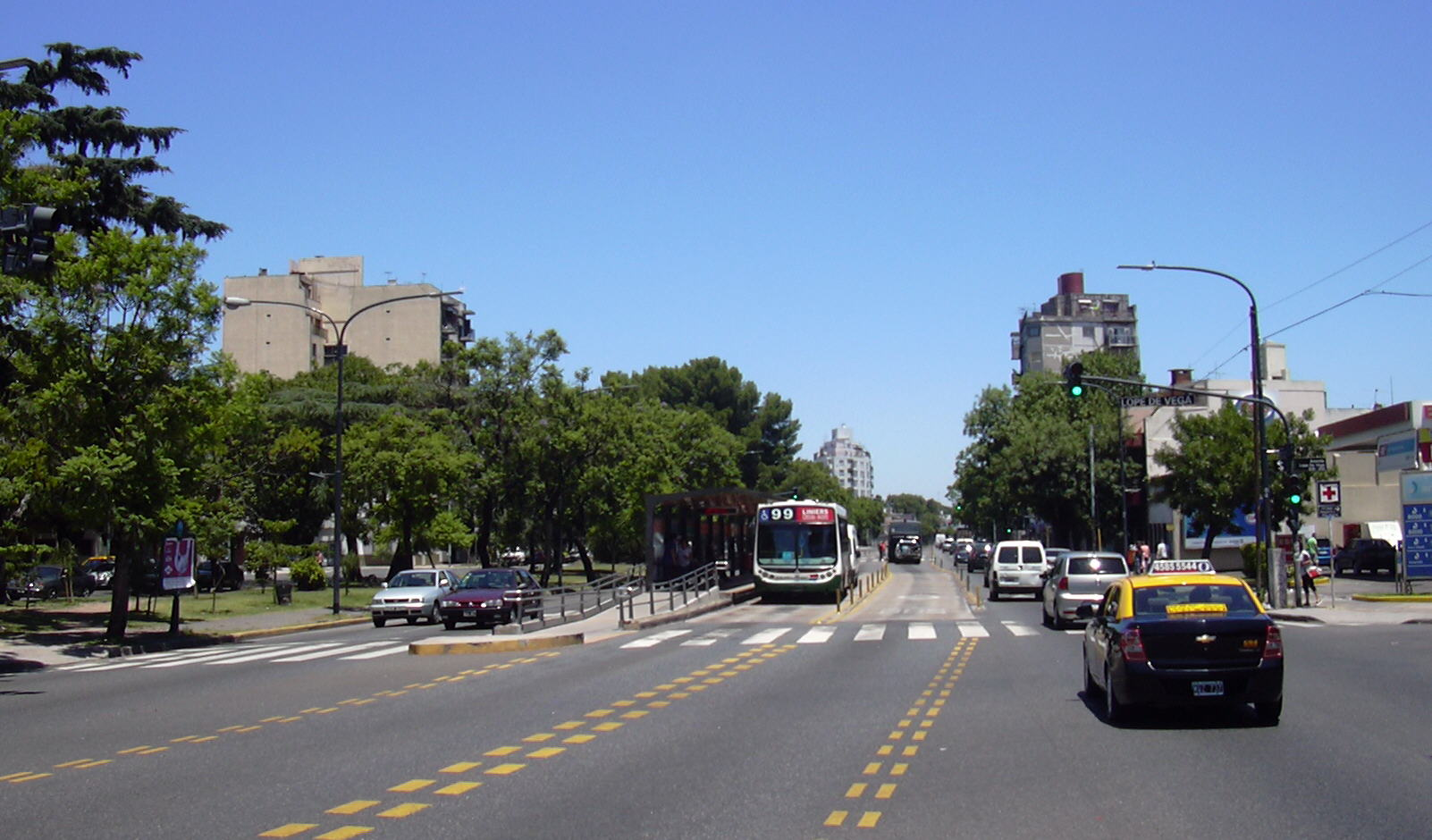
The avenue at the Villa Luro neighbourhood.

The Metrobus line on the avenue was the first of the network to open in 2011. It is 12 kilometres (7.5 mi) long, has 21 stations and carries 100,000 passengers per day with a frequency of one bus every 2 minutes. Its implementation has improved traffic significantly on the avenue.

The implementation of this Metrobus line was met with criticism from shop owners along Juan B. Justo who could no longer receive deliveries during peak hours due to there being less lanes for regular traffic, something which has been remedied by having specific hours for deliveries.
