= Metrobús (Buenos Aires) =

Bus rapid transit system in Buenos Aires, Argentina

Buenos Aires Metrobús
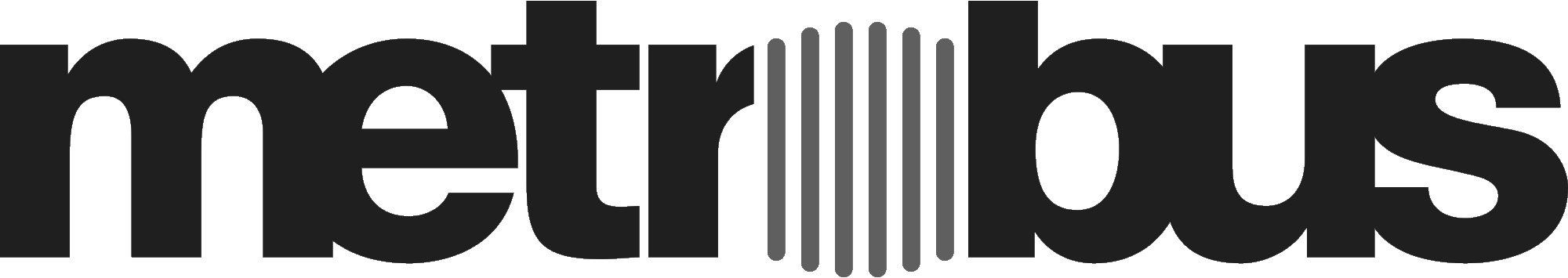

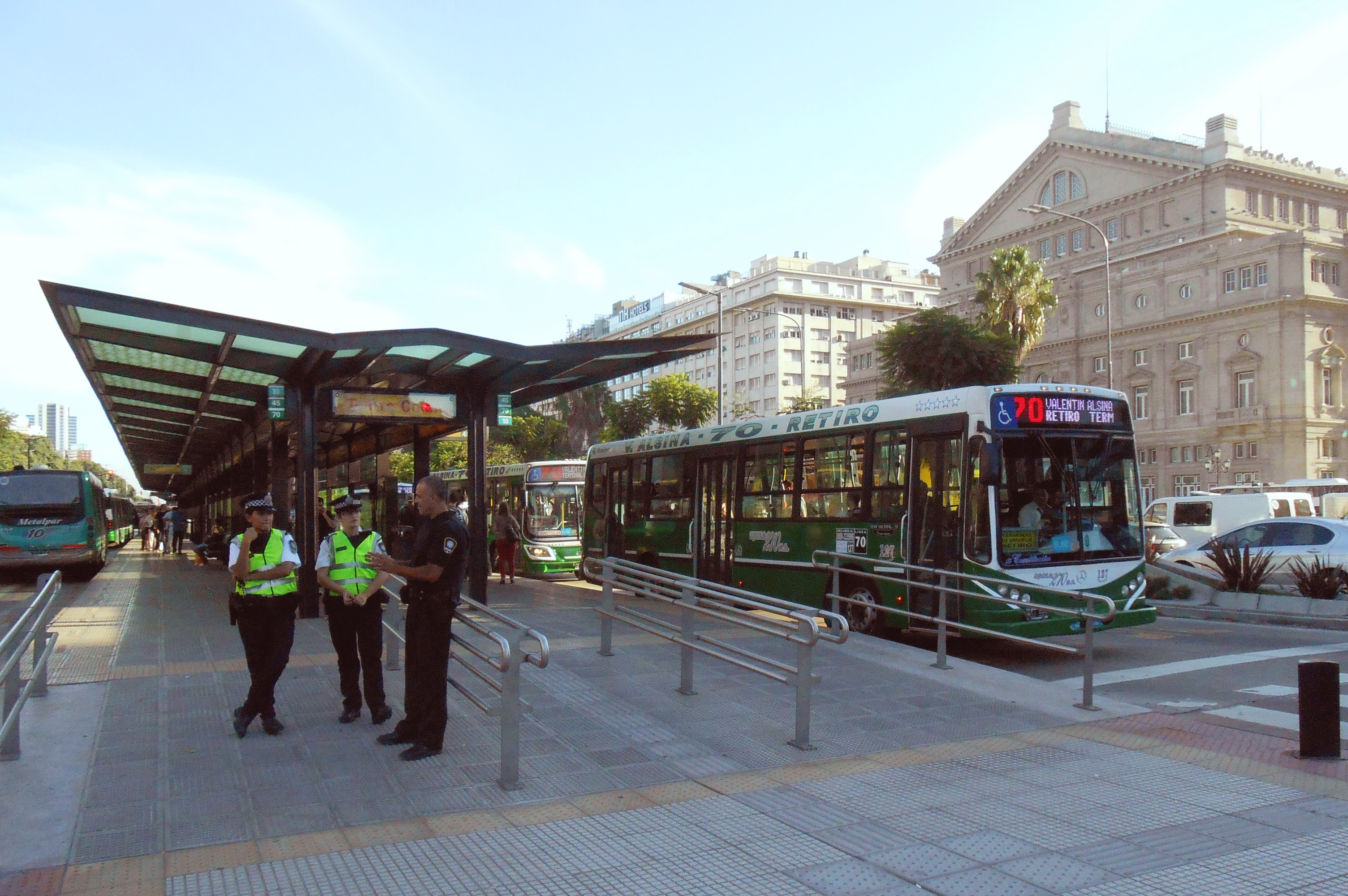

Overview
- Owner: City of Buenos Aires
- Locale: Buenos Aires
- Transit type: Bus rapid transit
- Number of lines: 5
- Number of stations: 113 (not including 25 de Mayo line)
- Daily ridership: 1 million (2015)
- Website: Official website

Operation
- Began operation: 31 May 2011

Technical
- System length: 50.5 km (31.4 mi)
System map
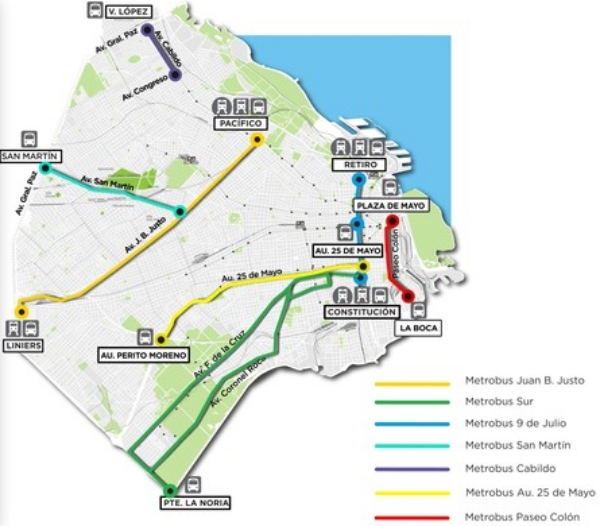
Map showing current lines and lines under construction. (Note: As of October 2015, The 25 de Mayo, 9 de Julio, Cabildo, Juan B. Justo and Sur lines are complete.) (Note: Some lines such as Metrobús Cabildo continue outside the limits of the city proper but are only shown up to the limits on this map.)

Metrobús is a 50.5-kilometre (31.4 mi) bus rapid transit network with dedicated, separated lanes and stations serving the city of Buenos Aires, Argentina. The headway is the same as before the system’s implementation, and the buses use the same branding as the main network, maintaining their previous identity as regular bus lines with their own route numbers. The service operates 24 hours a day, 365 days a year, with 2–4 minute frequencies during the day and 10–15 minutes at night.

== History ==
The first segment of the network opened to the public in May 2011, and runs all the way along Juan B. Justo Avenue linking the neighbourhoods of Liniers and Palermo. This segment consists of 21 stations and is 12 kilometres (7.5 mi) long.

The system's signage and bus stops were designed by Diana Cabeza, Martín Wolfson, and Gabriela Falgione.

The second segment of the network, opened on 24 July 2013, spans the length of the 9 de Julio Avenue, consisting of 17 stations running for 3 kilometres (1.9 mi).

The third segment of the network opened on 14 August 2013, and consists of 36 stops and is 23 kilometres (14 mi) long. This segment runs along important arteries in the southern area of the city, connecting commuters back and forth from the southern (Constitución) rail terminal of the General Roca Railway with the city proper (General Paz Avenue). In parts of this segment of the network (along Rabanal Avenue) the bus lines merge with the general traffic and return to the dedicated lane afterwards.

On 9 October 2013, the Government of the City announced plans for the extension of the network, which would involve a further extension of 56 kilometres (35 mi). When the network is complete, it will have a total of 7 lines carrying an estimated 1.2 million passengers per day.

The fourth line, Metrobús Cabildo, opened in June 2015 and connects Congreso de Tucumán (the terminus of Line D of the Buenos Aires Underground) with Vicente López in Greater Buenos Aires. This segment was originally going to be covered by Line D in its extension to the borders of the city proper, however the creation of this Metrobús line has meant that the Line D's extension is now unlikely.

An eighth line was announced in 2015 which would run from North to South in the West of the city, linking most of the East-West lines together. This line will most likely replace the planned Line I of the Buenos Aires Underground. Parts of this new line will run underground and use electric buses.

== Juan B. Justo Line ==
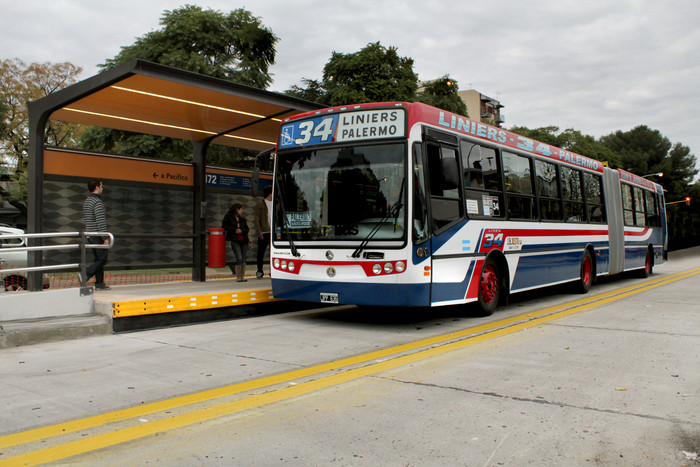
Articulated bus at a Juan B. Justo Line station.

The Metrobús Juan B. Justo was the first to begin operations, opening in 2011 and running down the entire length of the Juan B. Justo Avenue. It is 12 kilometres (7.5 mi) long, has 21 stations and carries 100,000 passengers per day with a frequency of one bus every 2 minutes. It is estimated that the implementation of the Metrobús along the avenue has reduced bus journey times by 40%, while also providing links to lines B and D of the Buenos Aires Underground, as well as to the Sarmiento and San Martín commuter rail lines.

The same exclusive lane is utilised by emergency vehicles. The implementation of this Metrobús line was met with some criticism from shop owners along the avenue who could no longer receive deliveries during peak hours due to the lower number of lanes for regular traffic, something which has been remedied by having specific hours for deliveries. The segment also resulted in a 30% increase in bus passengers as a result of the faster travel times and increased frequencies of the services.

== 9 de Julio Line ==
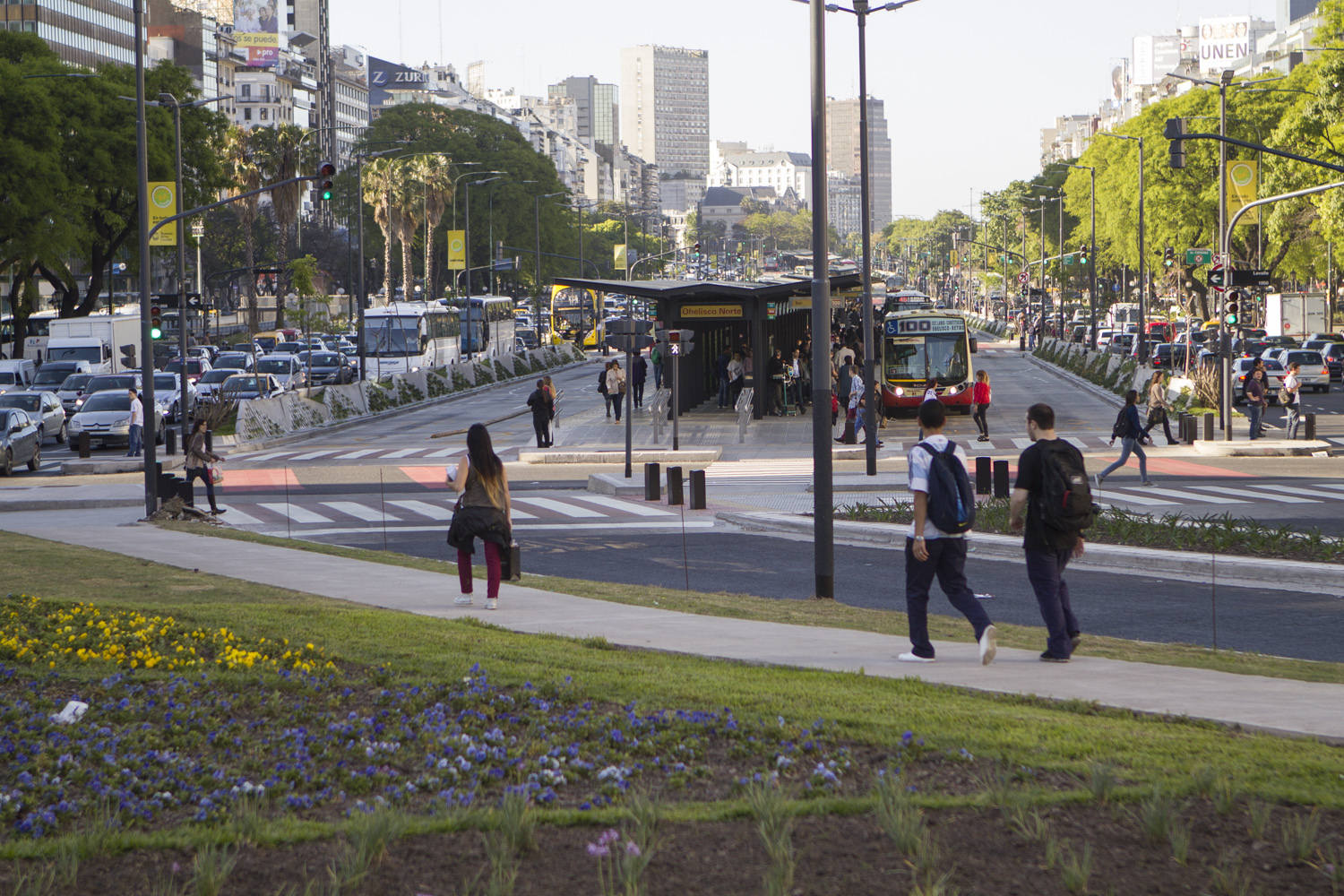
9 de Julio station

The Metrobus 9 de Julio is 3 kilometres (1.9 mi) long with 13 stations and runs down the 9 de Julio Avenue, taking roughly the same route as Line C of the Buenos Aires Underground. It serves 11 bus lines and reduces bus travel time by 50% along the avenue. The main objective of this line is to join together the city's two busiest railway stations: Retiro and Constitución and to serve the approximately 250,000 passengers per day which use buses along the avenue. The current journey time is 15 minutes instead of the 30 minutes journey time for buses before the line was built.

When the line was initially opened, the National Government criticised the new bus line for overlapping with Line C of the Underground. However, there is no evidence that passenger numbers on Line C have declined. Similarly, during the construction of the line there were harsh criticisms that many trees along the avenue would disappear. However, the City has stated that after construction was completed, there were 550 more trees along the avenue than before construction began. In May 2015, new 90 metre and 230 metre tunnels on the southern end of the line were opened. These tunnels go to and from Constitución railway station and are designed to decrease surface traffic in the area around the station, as well as reducing journey times on the line.

== Southern Line ==
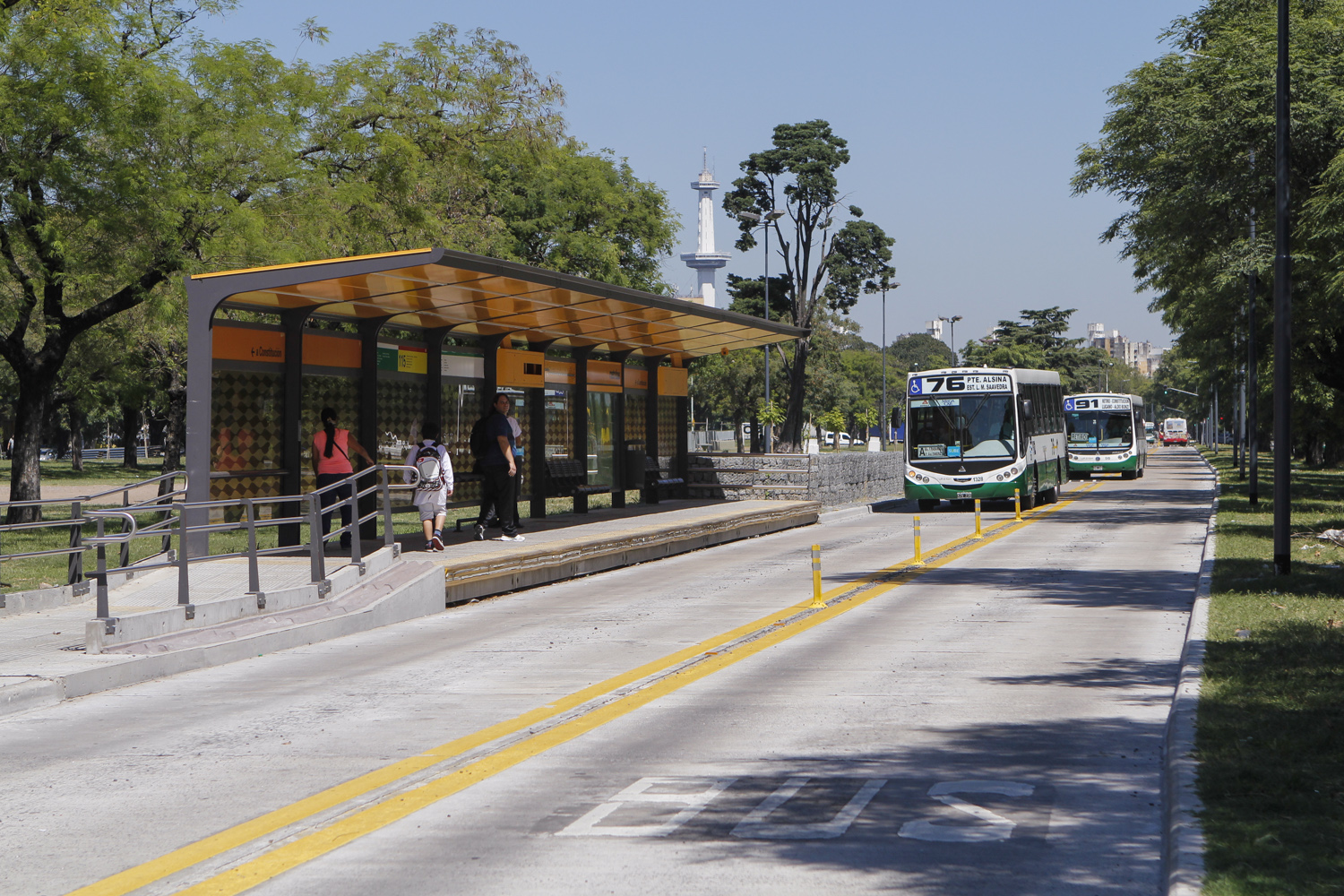
Buses approach Estadio Parque Roca station along the Sur line

The Metrobús Sur was inaugurated in 2013 and joins Constitución railway station to the south of the city, ending at Puente Noria at the border between the city proper and Greater Buenos Aires. The line has two branches, is 23 kilometres (14 mi) long and has 37 stations. It connects with the PreMetro E2 at its General Salvio terminus, with Underground Line H at Inclán and Line C's Constitución terminus where it also connects to the General Roca Railway.

The Sur Line will connect with Line H at Saenz once the line is extended there, and a larger transfer terminal was opened there in March 2015, where it will also connect with the Belgrano Sur commuter rail line. The line is estimated to carry around 250,000 passengers per day, with its creation increasing rider-ship by 30% and reducing journey times by 15%.

== Northern Line ==
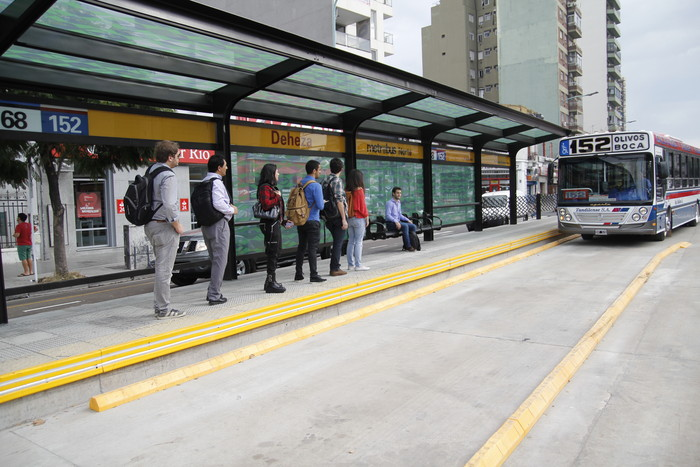
Bus at Deheza station.

The Metrobús Norte opened on 17 June 2015, serving as a feeder service to Line D of the underground at its Congreso de Tucumán terminus (where new entrances were built to accommodate the Metrobús line) and making it the first Metrobús line to continue out of Buenos Aires into Greater Buenos Aires. It has a length of 2.1 kilometres (1.3 mi) and was designed to reduce congestion in the area because of the number of passengers that were boarding Line D, whilst creating a terminal at the limits of the city at General Paz Highway for passengers from suburbs in Northern Greater Buenos Aires, such as Olivos and Vicente López.

This Metrobús line cost an estimated AR$ 265 million to build and benefits an estimated 200,000 people. Having a feeder service to Line D had been discussed for many years, and at one point this was going to be done using a Buenos Aires PreMetro service with a new PreMetro Line D1. However, the Metrobús ultimately proved the most appealing to city planners.

== 25 de Mayo Line ==
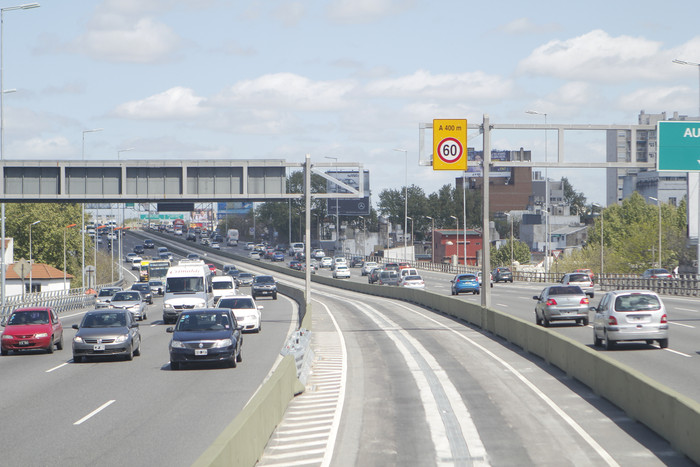
Central Metrobús lane on the 25 de Mayo expressway.

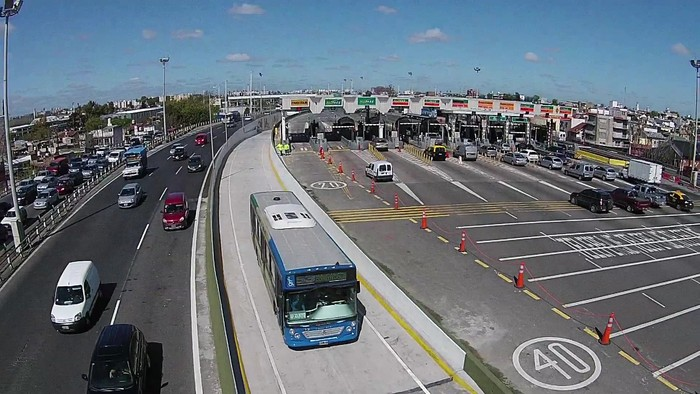
A bus on the Metrobús 25 de Mayo next to the Dellepiane tolls.

On 5 October 2015, the Metrobús 25 de Mayo was opened, being the first line to operate on an expressway. The line begins at the intersection of the Perito Moreno, Cámpora, Dellepiane and 25 de Mayo expressways and continues along the 25 de Mayo before arriving in the vicinity of Constitución railway station and the Perito Moreno expressway where it provides access to the Avenida 9 de Julio, the Metrobus 9 de Julio and Line C and Line E of the Buenos Aires Underground to the north, and the Roca Line, General Roca Railway and Line C to the south. The 7.5 kilometres (4.7 mi) line was expected to transport some 120,000 passengers daily.

The line has significantly different characteristics to the rest of the network, consisting of a single six-metre lane in the middle of the 25 de Mayo activated only during rush hour and shared with emergency vehicles. The space used for the Metrobús between regular traffic was already in existence and no extra space was taken from the 25 de Mayo expressway, which continues to have four lanes per side. However, additional tunnels and access ramps had to be built to accommodate the Metrobús. The bus lane is open between 6 am and 12 noon in the morning towards the city and then again between 3 pm and 9 pm with buses heading away from the city centre. The line is also the first to accommodate the long-distance buses entering and leaving the city to and from western and southern Argentina, and these are expected to make up the majority of traffic on the line, while journey times for both long distance and local buses using this line were expected to be reduced by 50%.

Along with the Metrobús line, the construction of a second bus terminal to reduce the strain on the Retiro bus terminal (by an estimated 40%) is being constructed at the start of the Metrobús line, at the intersections of the Dellepiane and 25 de Mayo expressways, with the intention of reducing the quantity of long distance buses making their way into the centre of the city. At the terminal, the Metrobús will connect with Line E of the Buenos Aires Underground at a proposed new station, while the terminal itself is expected to open in November. Prior to the opening of the Metrobús line, a new complex interchange was constructed at the western point of the line, over where the terminal is to be located.

== Gallery ==
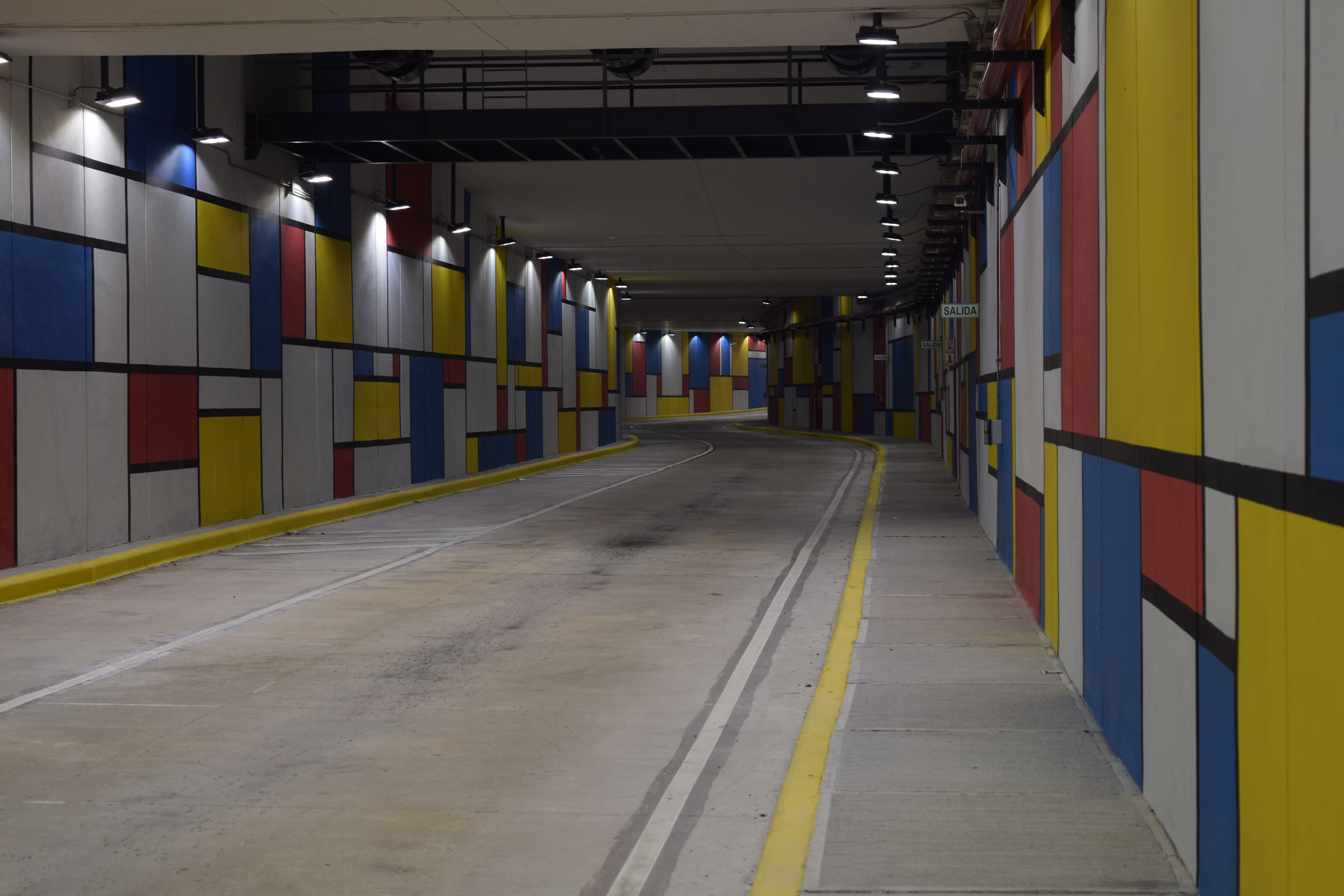
One of the tunnels on the 9 de Julio line

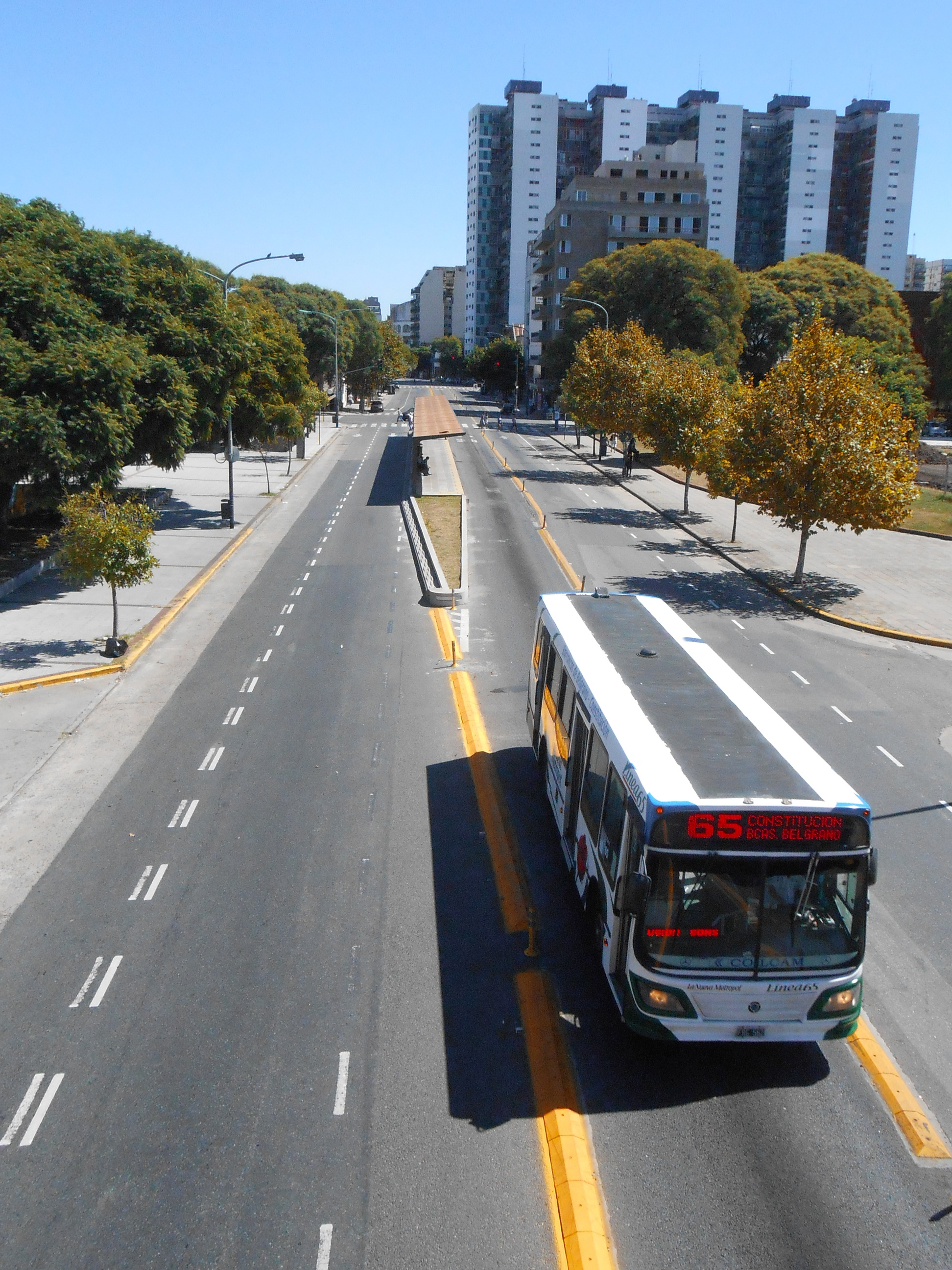
Number 65 bus leaving a Metrobús station

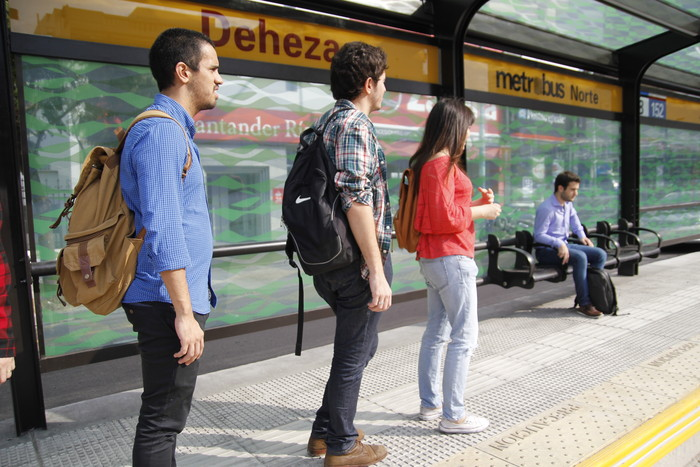
Northern line station

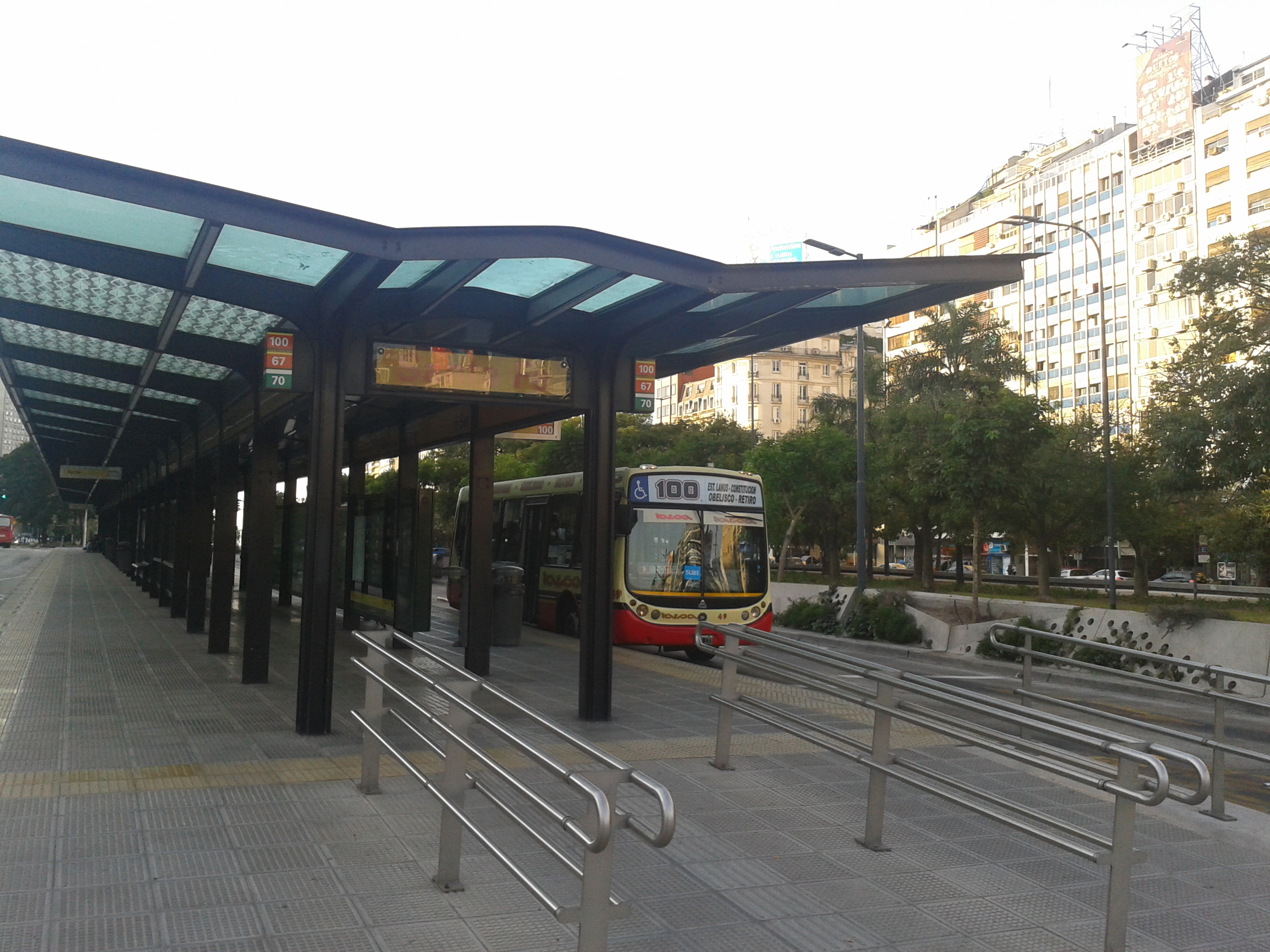
Number 100 bus at Santa Fe station

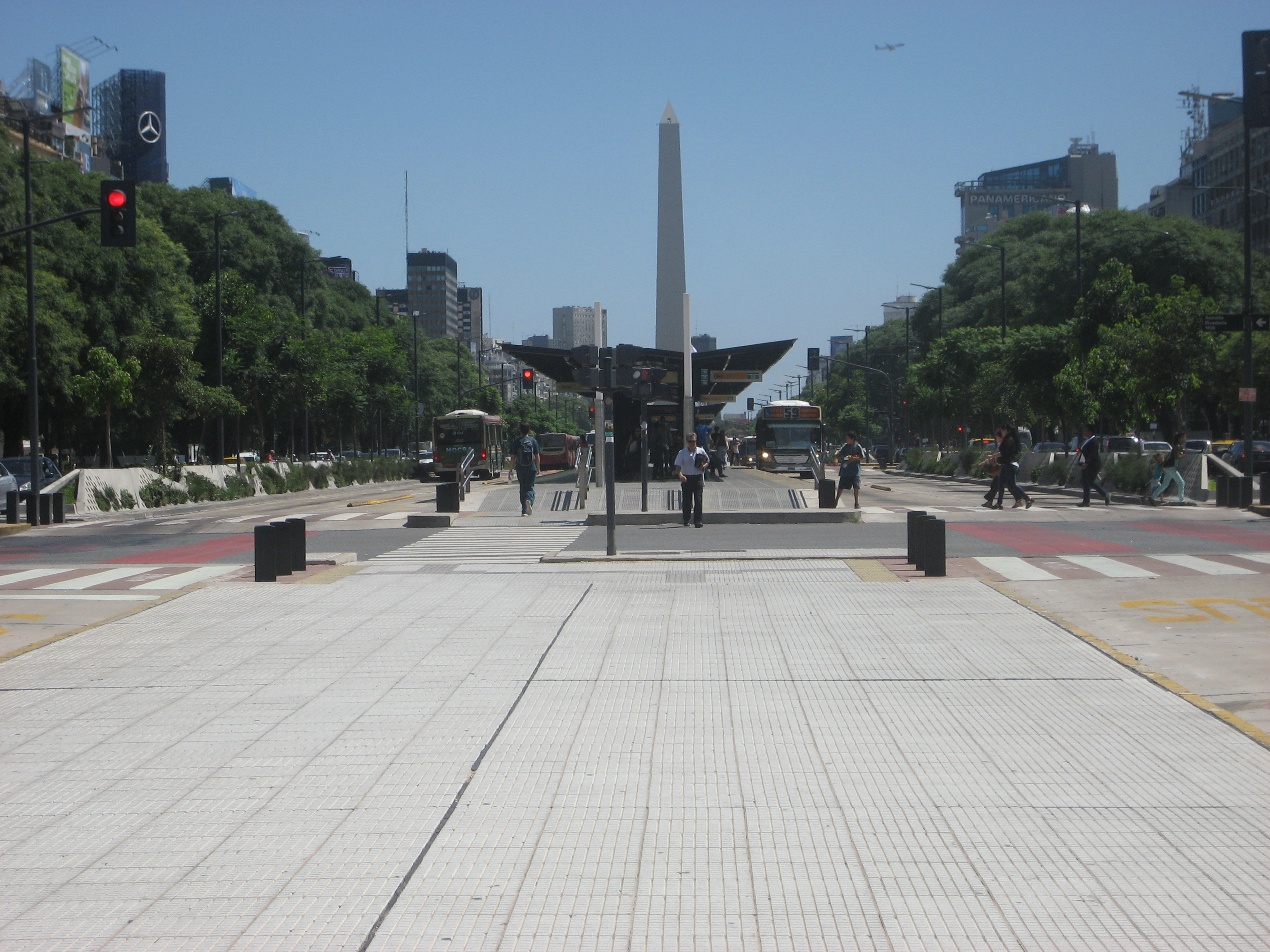
View of the Obelisco from a Metrobús station

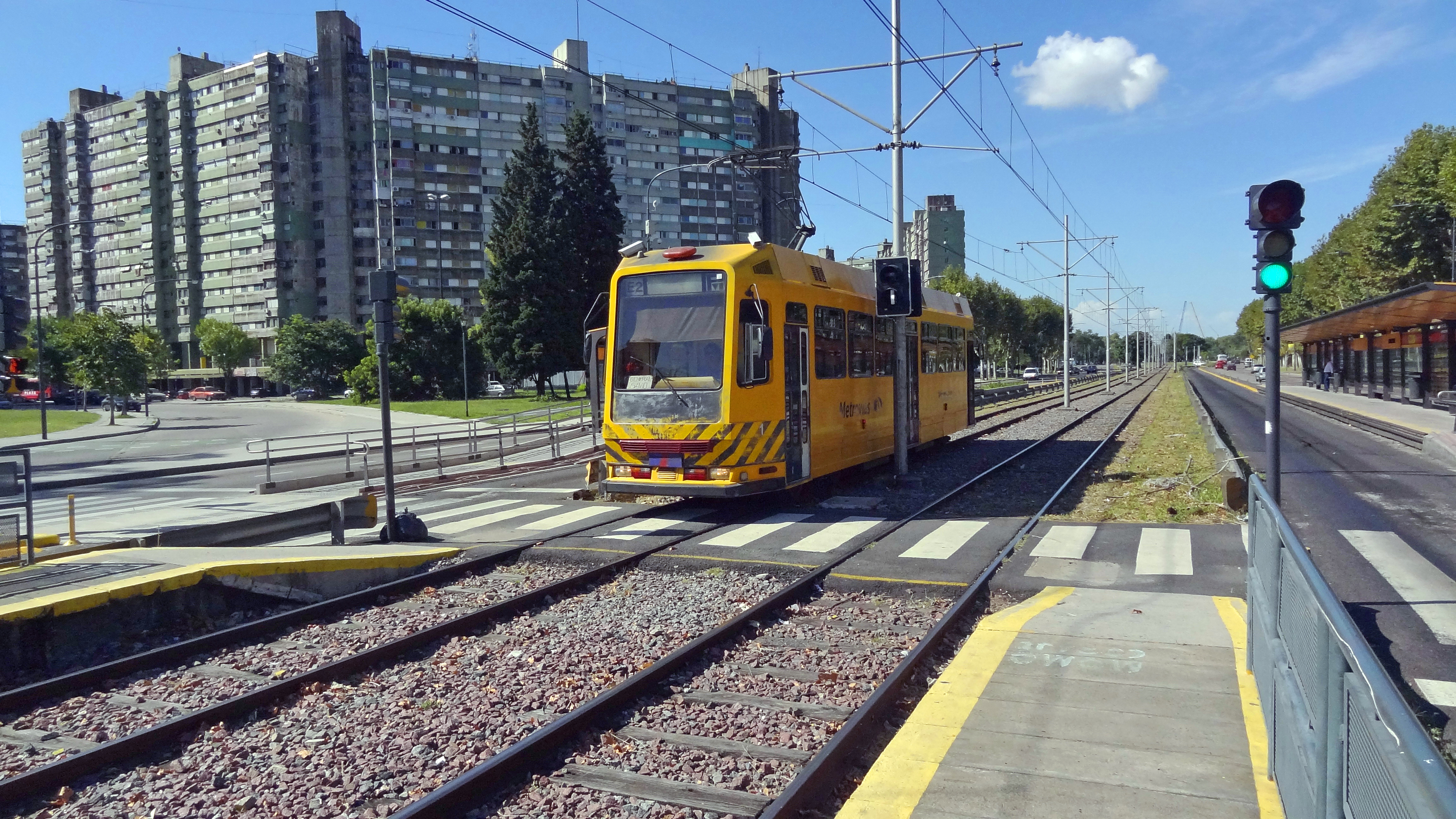
Metrobús Sur station next to a Buenos Aires PreMetro tram

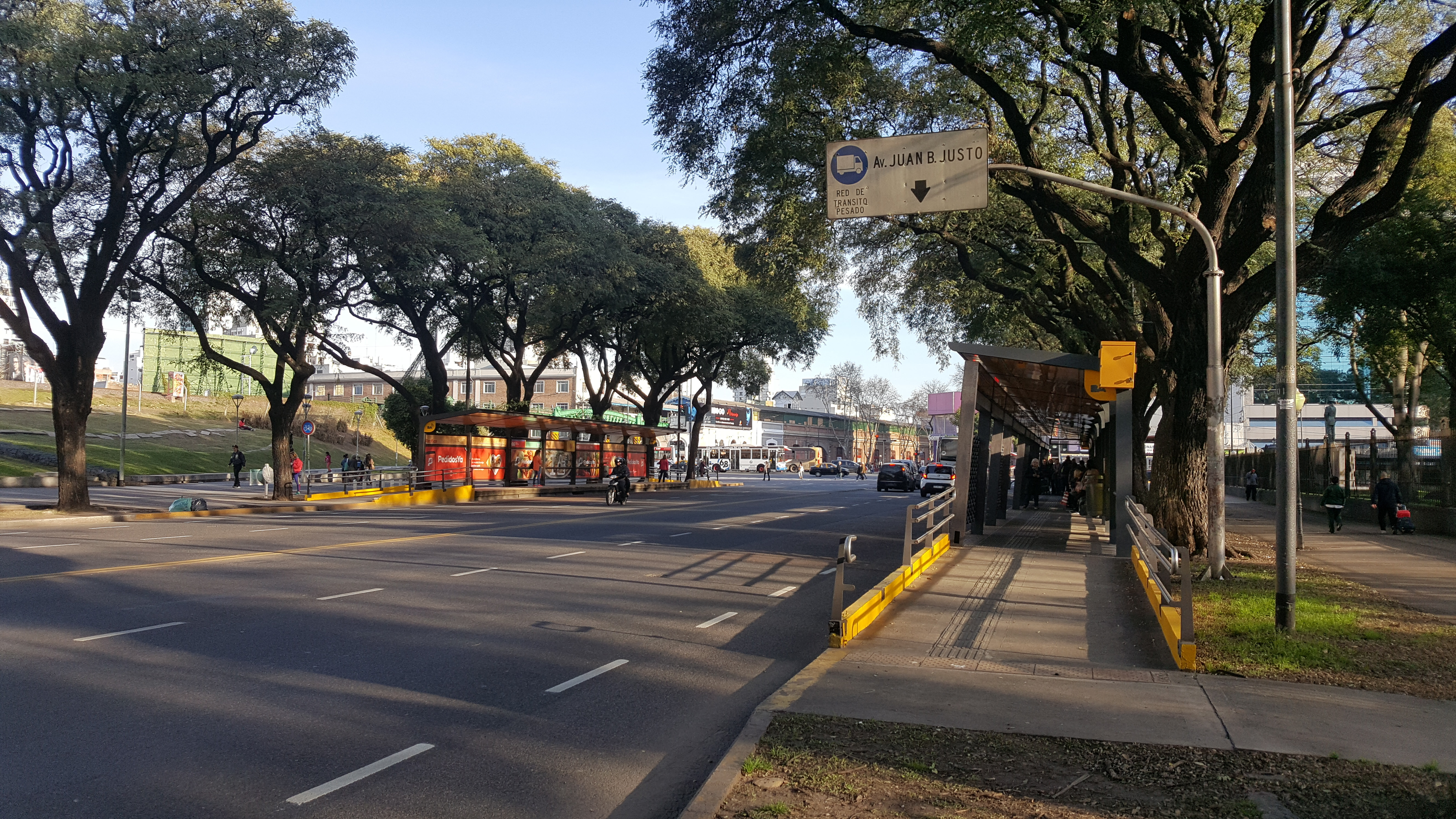
Metrobús Juan B. Justo station, Puente Pacifico

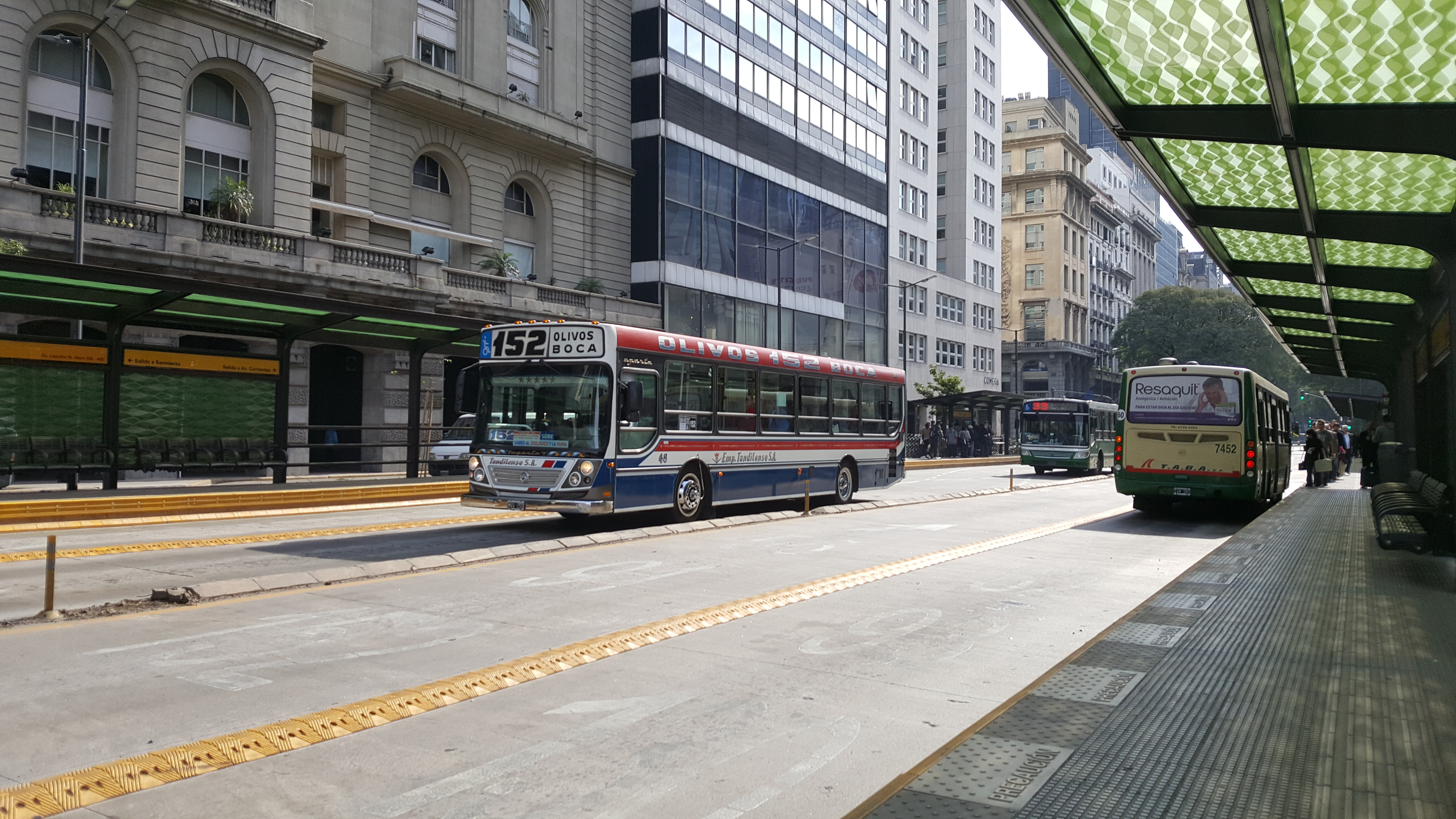
Metrobús Del Bajo platform

== See also ==
- Transport in Argentina
- Trams in Buenos Aires
- Buenos Aires Underground
- Colectivo
