= Congreso de Tucumán (Buenos Aires Underground) =

Buenos Aires Underground station

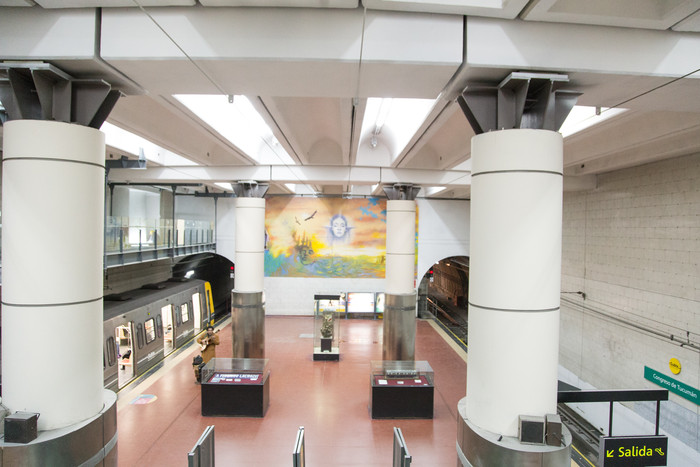

General information
- Location: Av. Cabildo and Av. Congreso
- Coordinates: 34°33′20.2″S 58°27′44.7″W
- Platforms: Island platforms

History
- Opened: 27 April 2000

Services
Preceding station	Buenos Aires Underground	Following station
Terminus	Line D	Juramento towards Catedral
Location

Congreso de Tucumán is a station on Line D of the Buenos Aires Underground and is the current terminus. The station was opened on 27 April 2000 as the western terminus of the extension of the line from Juramento. It is located at the intersection of Cabildo and Congreso avenues. As of June 2015, the station connects to the Metrobus Cabildo bus rapid transit line that was opened that year. New underground passageways and station entrances were made for the station to provide easy transfer to the Metrobus line.

== See also ==
- Santa Fe Avenue
