= Juan Domínguez =

Juan Domínguez may refer to:

== Sportsmen ==
- Juan Carlos Domínguez (born 1971), Spanish road racing cyclist
- Juan Domínguez (baseball) (born 1980), Dominican baseball player
- Juan Domínguez (footballer, born 1983), Spanish footballer
- Juan Domínguez (Colombian footballer) (born 1986), Colombian footballer
- Juan Domínguez (footballer, born 1990), Spanish footballer
- Juan Carlos Domínguez (footballer) (born 1943), Argentine footballer
- Juan Domínguez (boxer) (born 1986), Dominican boxer

== Others ==
- Juan Domínguez de Medina (died 1246), Castilian prelate
- Juan Domínguez de Mendoza (born 1631), Spanish soldier in New Spain
- Juan Dominguez Palermo (c. 1560–1635), Sicilian soldier and politician in the Viceroyalty of Peru
- Juan Domínguez (politician), Uruguayan politician
- Juan Ignacio Domínguez (born 1941), Chilean agronomist, academic and politician
