= Cervino =

Cervino may refer to:

== Places ==
- Monte Cervino, also known as Matterhorn, a 4,478 metres mountain, located between the Aosta Valley (Italy) and the Canton of Valais (Switzerland)
- Cervino, Campania, a comune (town) in the Province of Caserta, Italy
- Txindoki, a mountain in the Province of Gipuzkoa, Basque Country, Spain

== People ==
- Cerviño, a Galician surname

== Other uses ==
- Monte Cervino Battalion, an Italian parachute battalion
