= Palermo, Buenos Aires =

Palermo
- Neighborhood of Buenos Aires
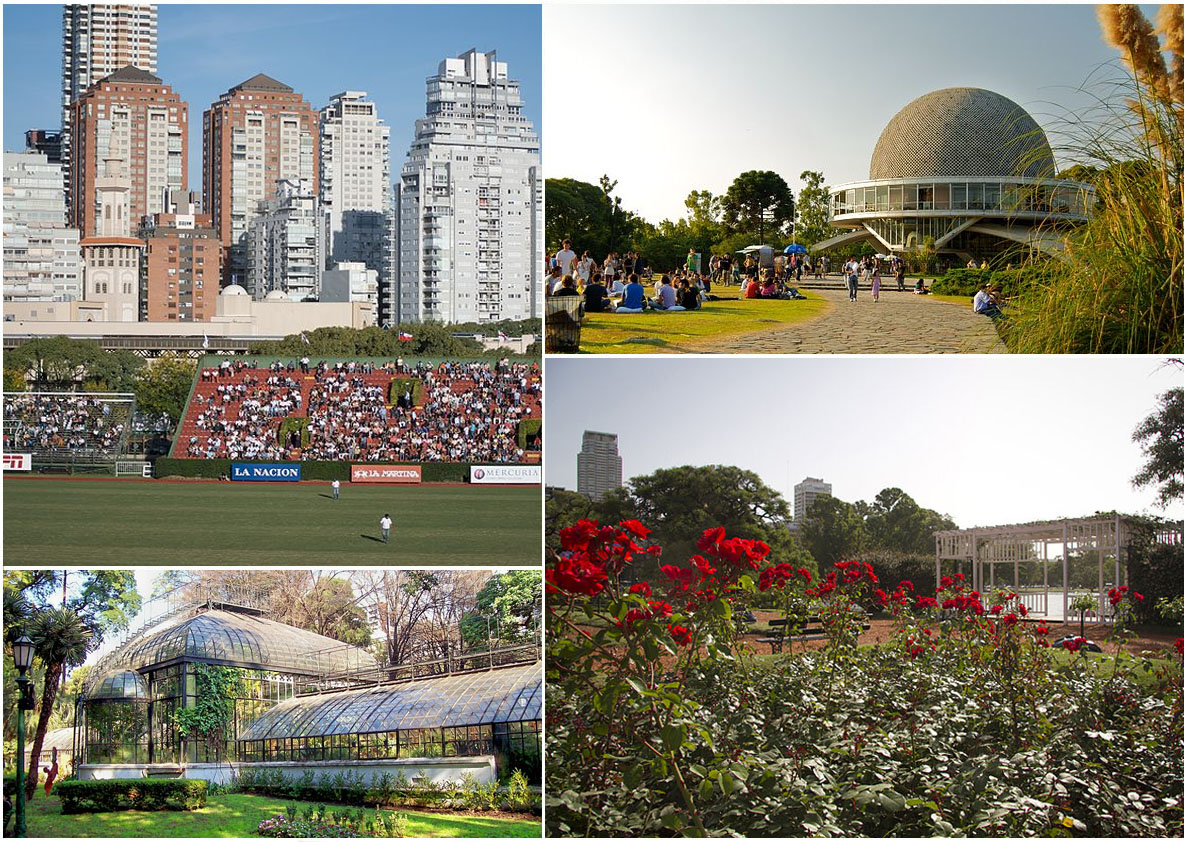
- Clockwise from top left: the Polo Stadium, the Galileo Galilei planetarium, the Palermo Woods and the Botanical Garden.

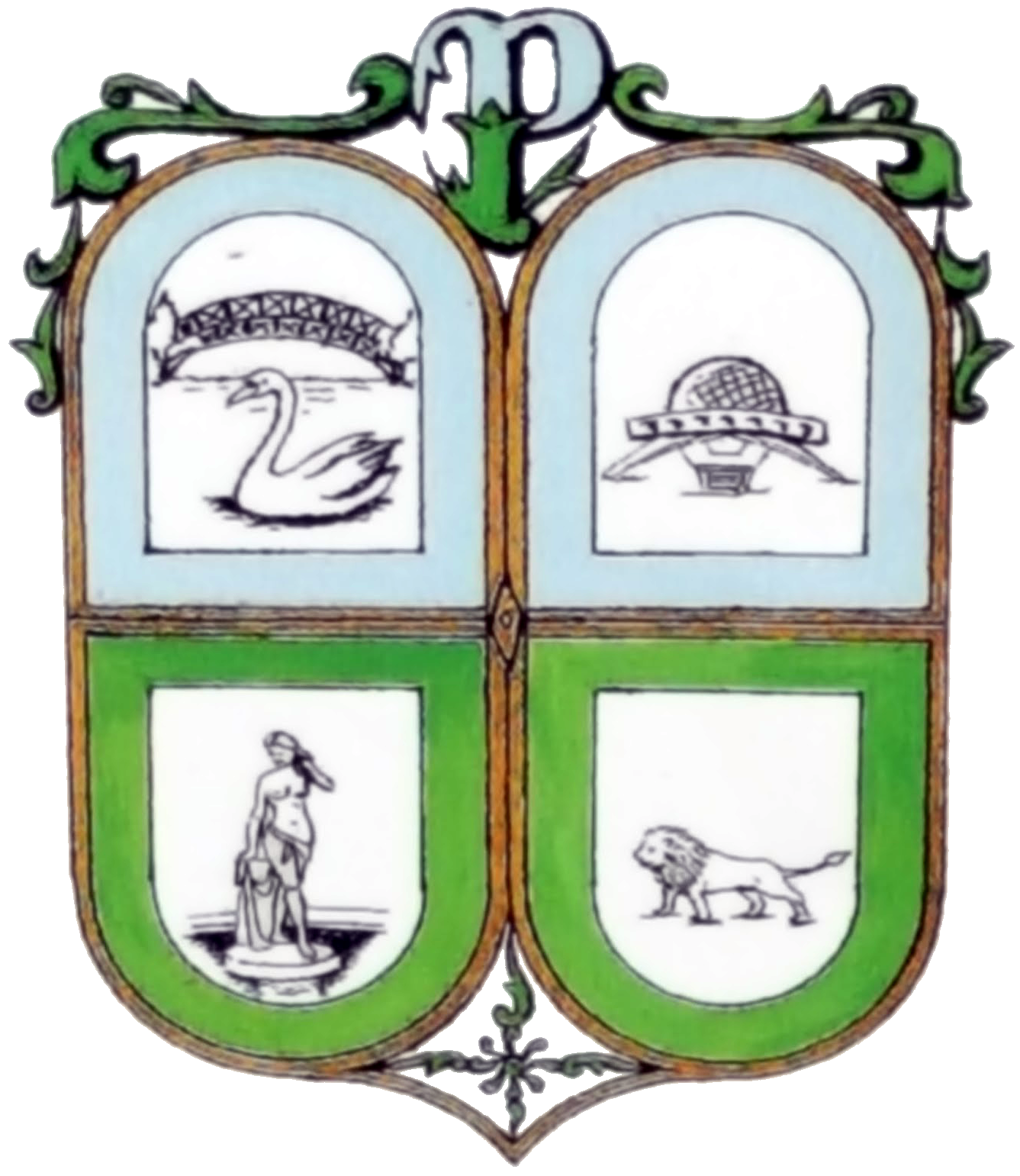
- Emblem
- Location of Palermo in Buenos Aires.
- Country: Argentina
- Autonomous city: Buenos Aires
- Comuna: C14
- Important sites: National Museum of Decorative Arts, Latin American Art Museum of Buenos Aires, Palermo Racetrack, Argentine Polo Field, Palermo Woods, Buenos Aires Botanical Garden, Buenos Aires Eco-Park, Jorge Newbery Airport

Government
  - President: Martín Cantera (PRO-JxC)

Area
  - Total: 15.9 km^{2} (6.1 sq mi)

Population (2022)
  - Total: 249,016
  - Density: 15,700/km^{2} (40,600/sq mi)
- Time zone: UTC-3 (ART)

Palermo is a barrio or neighborhood of Buenos Aires, Argentina. It is located in the north of the city, near the Río de la Plata.

It has a total land area of 17.4 km^{2} and a population of 249,016. It is the only barrio within the administrative division of Comuna 14.

Palermo is perhaps best known as the polo capital of the world. Each year, in November, the city hosts the Argentine Polo Open, commonly known as the Palermo Open.

== History ==
The name of the area is derived from the still-existing Franciscan abbey of "Saint Benedict of Palermo", also known as Saint Benedict the Moor. Saint Benedict the Moor lived from 1526 to 1589 and is a complementary patron saint of Palermo, the capital city of Sicily.

According to an alternative history of the name "Palermo", a folk story supported by journalists, the land would have been originally purchased by an Italian immigrant named Juan Domingo Palermo in the late 16th century, shortly after the foundation of Buenos Aires in 1580. Juan Manuel de Rosas built a country residence there which was confiscated after his fall in 1852.

The area grew rapidly during the last third of the 19th century, particularly during the presidency of Domingo Faustino Sarmiento, who was responsible for the creation of the Buenos Aires Zoological Gardens and the Parque Tres de Febrero in 1874, and Plaza Italia and the Palermo Race Track in 1876, all on the grounds of what had been Rosas' pleasure villa.

During the 20th century, the Buenos Aires Botanical Gardens (1902), Jorge Newbery Airport (1948), the water purification plant, several sport clubs, the Galileo Galilei planetarium (1966), and the Buenos Aires Japanese Gardens (1967) were developed.

== Subdivisions ==
Unofficial neighborhoods into which Palermo is commonly subdivided

Although appearing as one big swath on the official map, Palermo can be subdivided into several contrasting and acutely individual parts, the most clearly delimited of which may be considered further de facto neighborhoods of Buenos Aires.

=== Palermo Chico y Barrio Parque ===
The most upmarket part of Palermo, "Palermo Chico" ("Small" or "Exclusive" Palermo), is on Palermo's north-eastern edge, across Figueroa Alcorta Avenue and between San Martín de Tours and Tagle streets. Neighboring "Barrio Parque" is strictly a residential area, laid out in winding streets by Carlos Thays; many of the wealthy and famous own homes in this section, which also includes numerous embassies and the San Martín National Institute. It was once an area full of splendid mansions set in broad private parks; many have been demolished by developers. The quarter nevertheless remains one of the wealthiest in the city, home to luxury condominium and apartment developments, the largest of which is currently the Le Parc Figueroa Alcorta towers. MALBA, the Museum of Latin American Art in Buenos Aires, is located next door between Barrio Parque and the Paseo Alcorta shopping center.

=== Palermo Norte, Alto Palermo y Villa Freud ===
Alto Palermo is downtown Palermo, the main shopping area and transport hub around Santa Fe Avenue. Centered on Las Heras Park and the Alto Palermo Shopping Mall, this section is the easternmost edge of Palermo and borders the Recoleta section known as Barrio Norte. Palermo Norte is located along Libertador Avenue to the northwest of Palermo Chico, and the site of landmarks such as the Argentine Automobile Club and the National Museum of Decorative Arts.

Villa Freud, based around Plaza Güemes, is a residential area known for its high concentration of psychoanalysts and psychiatrists, hence its name.

=== Palermo Nuevo y Palermo Zoológico ===
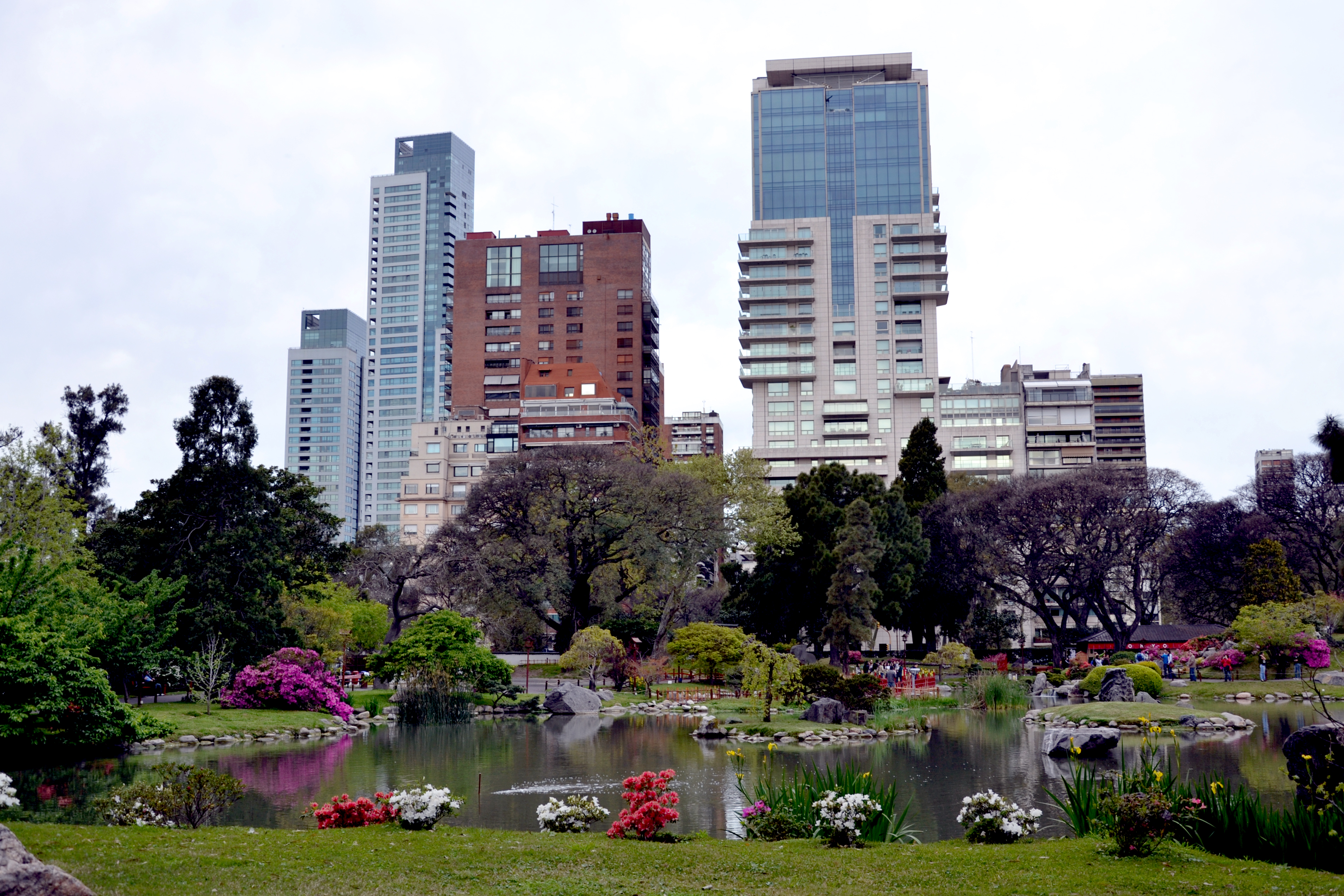
The Japanese Gardens of the Palermo Woods

This area borders Palermo Norte further northwest along Libertador Avenue centered on the Monument to the Four Regions of Argentina; raised by the Spanish community in 1910, this landmark is commonly referred to as the "Spanish Monument". The Buenos Aires Zoo, the Buenos Aires Botanical Gardens, La Rural expo grounds, the U.S. Embassy and Ambassador's Residence, the Buenos Aires Japanese Gardens, and Parque Tres de Febrero (commonly known as Bosques de Palermo, or "Palermo Woods") are located in this area. Inspired by the "Bois de Boulogne" in Paris and the Prater (or Vienna Meadow) in Vienna, the Palermo Woods are the largest green area in the city of Buenos Aires and itself includes landmarks such as the Rose Garden, the Eduardo Sívori Museum, and the Galileo Galilei planetarium.

=== Las Cañitas y La Imprenta ===
Las Cañitas, further northwest along Libertador, was a tenement district early in the twentieth century; but it has since become an upmarket area of high-rises, restaurants and bars, particularly in the vicinity of the Palermo Racetrack and the Campo Argentino de Polo. The King Fahd Islamic Cultural Center was built in 2000 just east of the Polo fields. The Regiment of Mounted Grenadiers headquarters and other military installations, such as the Central Military Hospital and the Military Geographic Institute, are located to the south.

La Imprenta, west of Las Cañitas, borders the Belgrano ward. One of its best-known landmarks is the Parish of San Benito Abad and the neighboring Solar de la Abadía shopping gallery.

=== Palermo Viejo ===
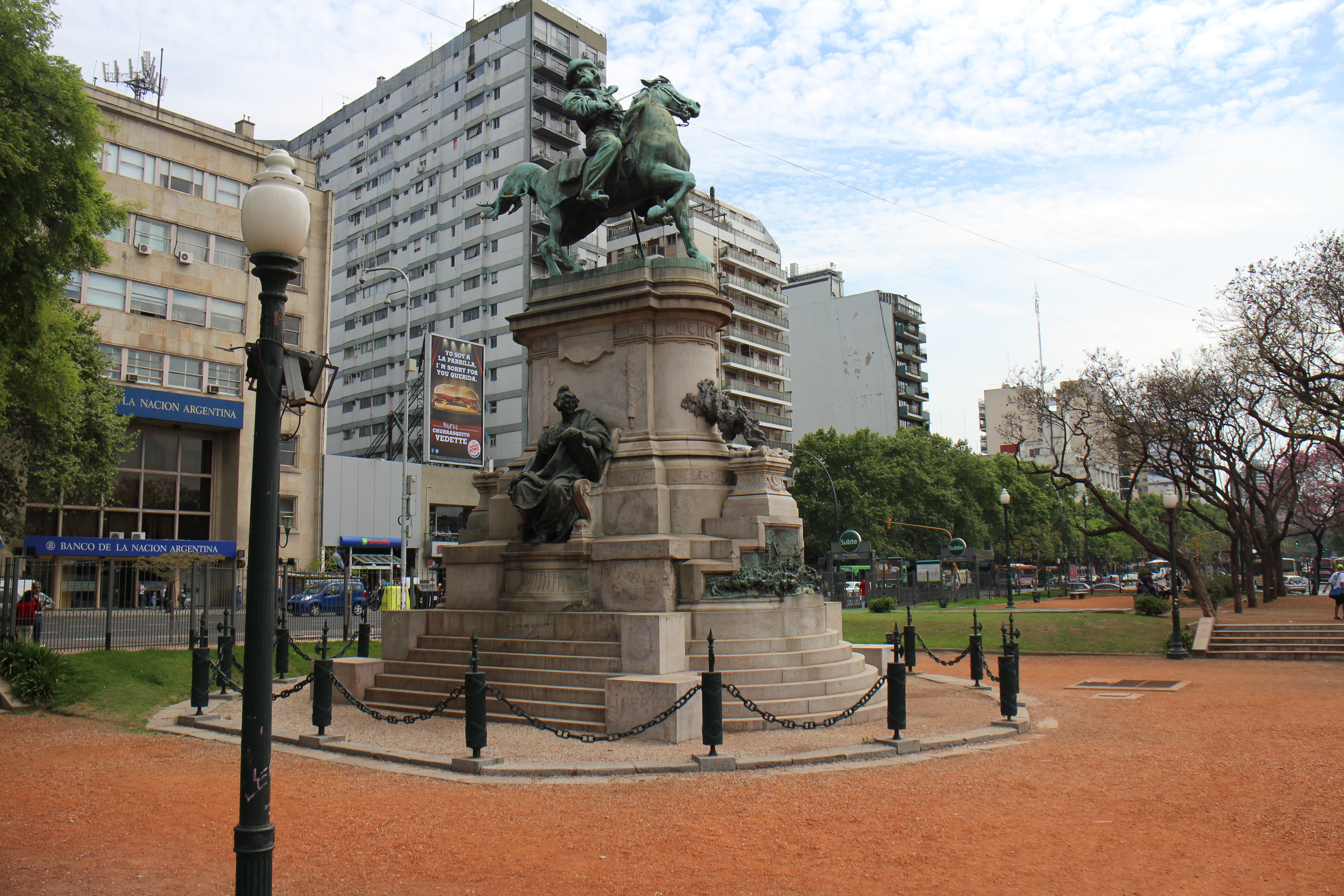
Plaza Italia, a focal point in Palermo Viejo.

Palermo Viejo (Old Palermo) is, as its name implies, the oldest part. It runs from Santa Fe Avenue south to Córdoba Avenue, and from Avenida Dorrego east to Coronel Díaz Street. The neighborhood is centered on Plaza Palermo Viejo, and reflects an older Spanish Colonial Revival style in architecture, often "recycled" with modern elements. The new headquarters of the National Research Council, opened in 2011 in the refurbished former GIOL winery, is a notable recent example of this trend.

Such well-known figures as Jorge Luis Borges and Che Guevara once lived in this ward and indeed Borges first wrote poetry in the then quiet barrio. Borges's poem "The Mythical Founding of Buenos Aires" names a typical square (bordered by Guatemala, Serrano, Paraguay, and Gurruchaga streets) adjacent to his childhood home, a popular tourist landmark.

It was historically a residential area, popular with immigrant communities from Poland, Armenia, Ukraine, and Lebanese; as well as old Spanish and Italian families, whose traditions are reflected in local restaurants, churches, schools and cultural centres.

=== Palermo Soho ===
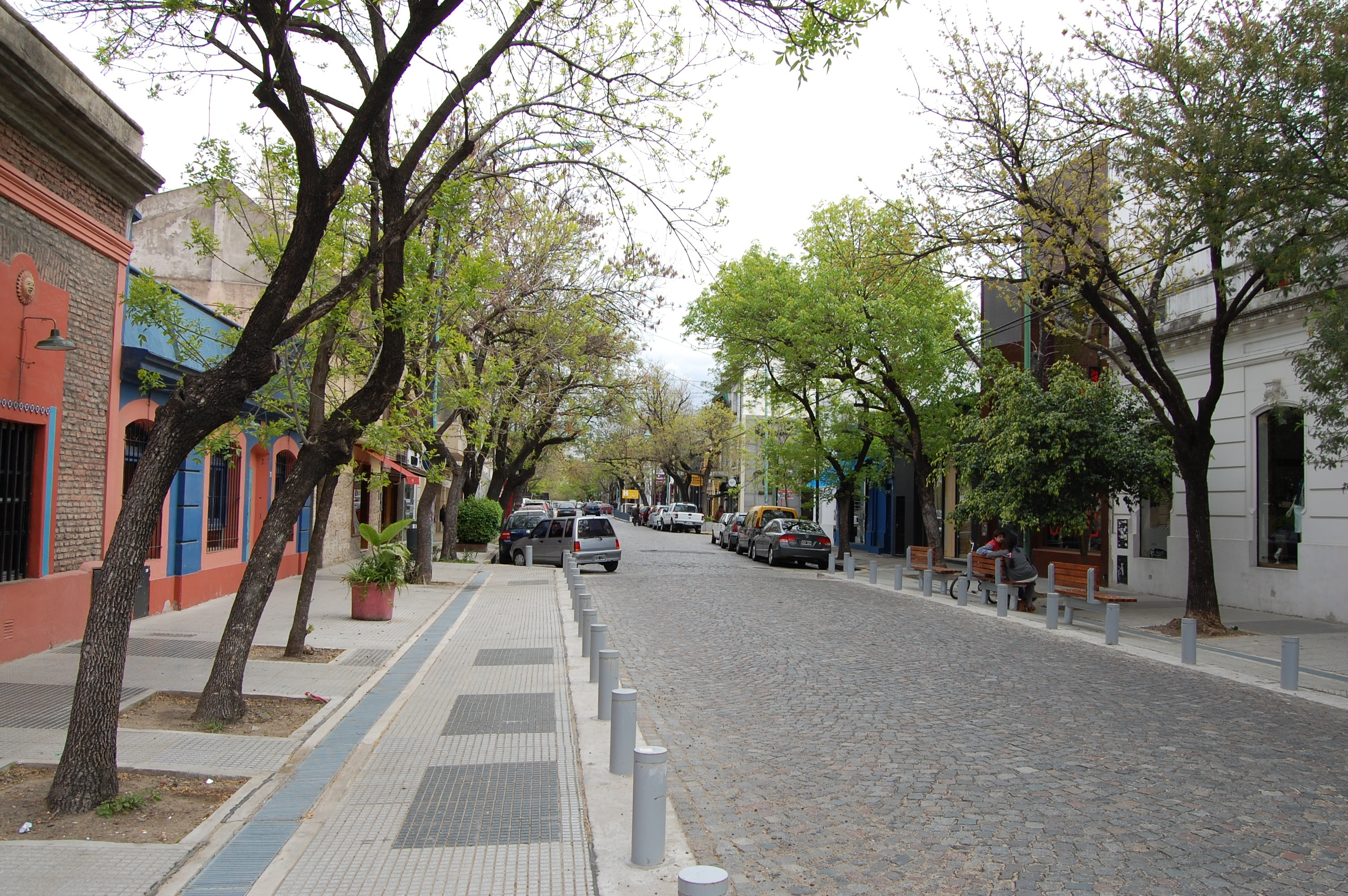
Cobblestoned street with low houses in Palermo Soho

Palermo Soho is a small area of Palermo Viejo around Plaza Serrano (officially Plazoleta Cortázar) near Palermo's south-western edge. It is a newly fashionable area for fashion, design, restaurants, bars, and street culture. The atmosphere in many cafés and restaurants strives to be "alternative", which makes this area of the city especially popular with young, upper-middle-class Argentines as well as foreign tourists looking for a "hipster" neighborhood. The traditional low houses have been adapted into boutiques and bars, creating a bohemian feel. The square has a crafts fair.

=== Palermo Hollywood ===
In the mid-nineties a number of TV and radio producers installed themselves in the area between Córdoba, Santa Fe, Dorrego, and Juan B. Justo Avenues in Palermo Viejo. For that reason, this part of the neighborhood began to be called "Palermo Hollywood". It is best known for the concentration of restaurants, sports clubs (such as Club Atlético Palermo), cafés, and an active nightlife.

=== Pacífico ===
This area is centered on Santa Fe Avenue, a few blocks both north and south from Pacífico bridge, so-called because of the Mitre railway line—previously called the "Buenos Aires to Pacific Railway"—bridge which spans the avenue and is an urban landmark and reference point. Pacifico is a mid-market commercial area and an important transport hub, for the train, metro and many bus lines connect here.

== Public transportation ==
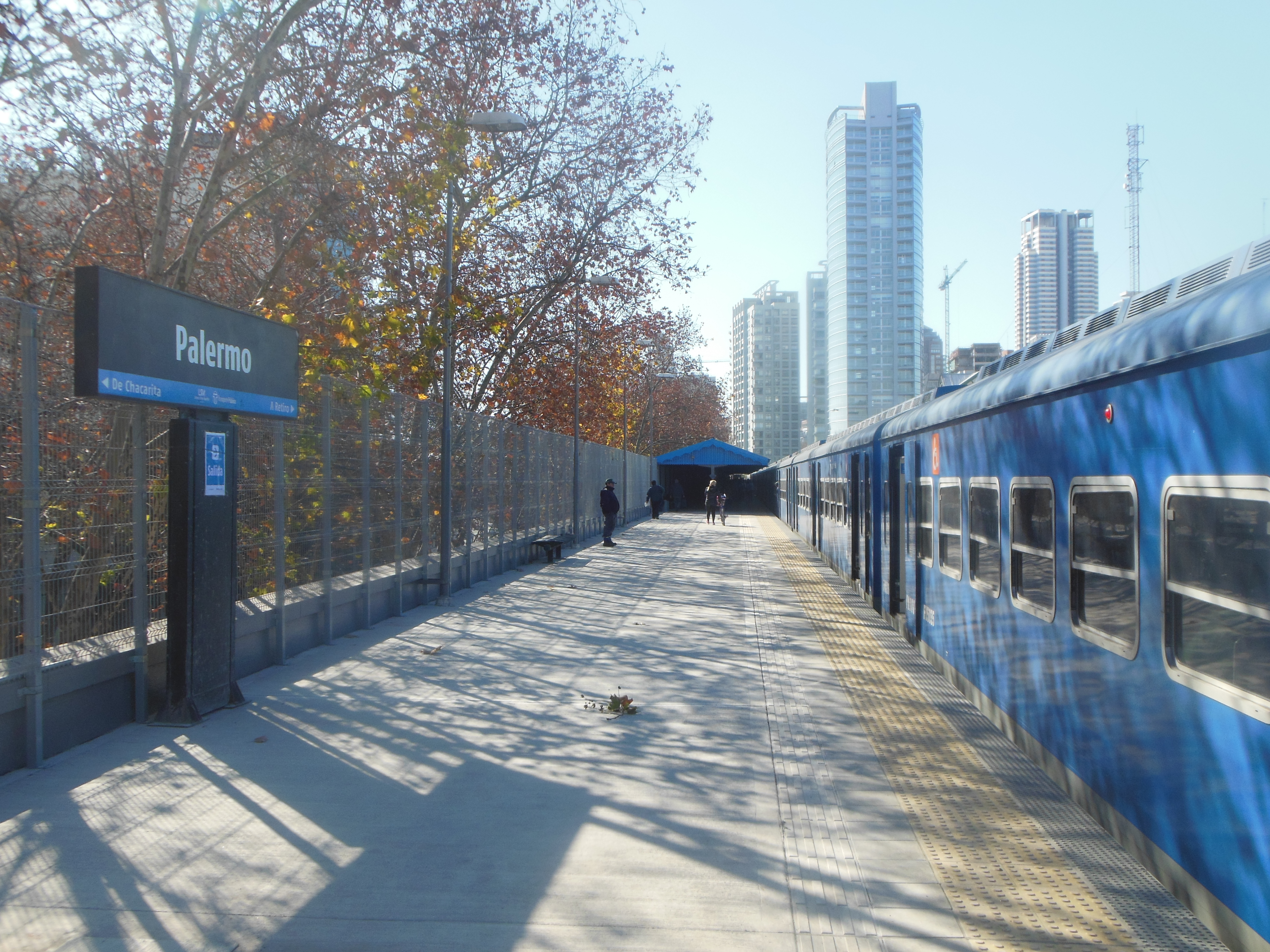
The San Martín Line's Palermo train station

Buenos Aires Underground Line D has several stations within Palermo's boundaries under Santa Fe and Cabildo avenues: Bulnes, Scalabrini Ortiz, Plaza Italia, Palermo, Ministro Carranza, and Olleros (at the limit with Colegiales). Currently, no other Underground line serves the area, but eventually Line F and Line I will pass through it once completed.

Four commuter railway lines go through the neighborhood: Retiro - José León Suárez (Mitre Line), Retiro - Tigre (Mitre Line), Retiro - Pilar (San Martín Line), and Retiro - Villa Rosa (Belgrano Norte Line). A total of five railway stations are located in Palermo.

The Metrobus Juan B. Justo, inaugurated in 2011, also passes through Palermo. There are no other planned Metrobus lines there.

== Image gallery ==
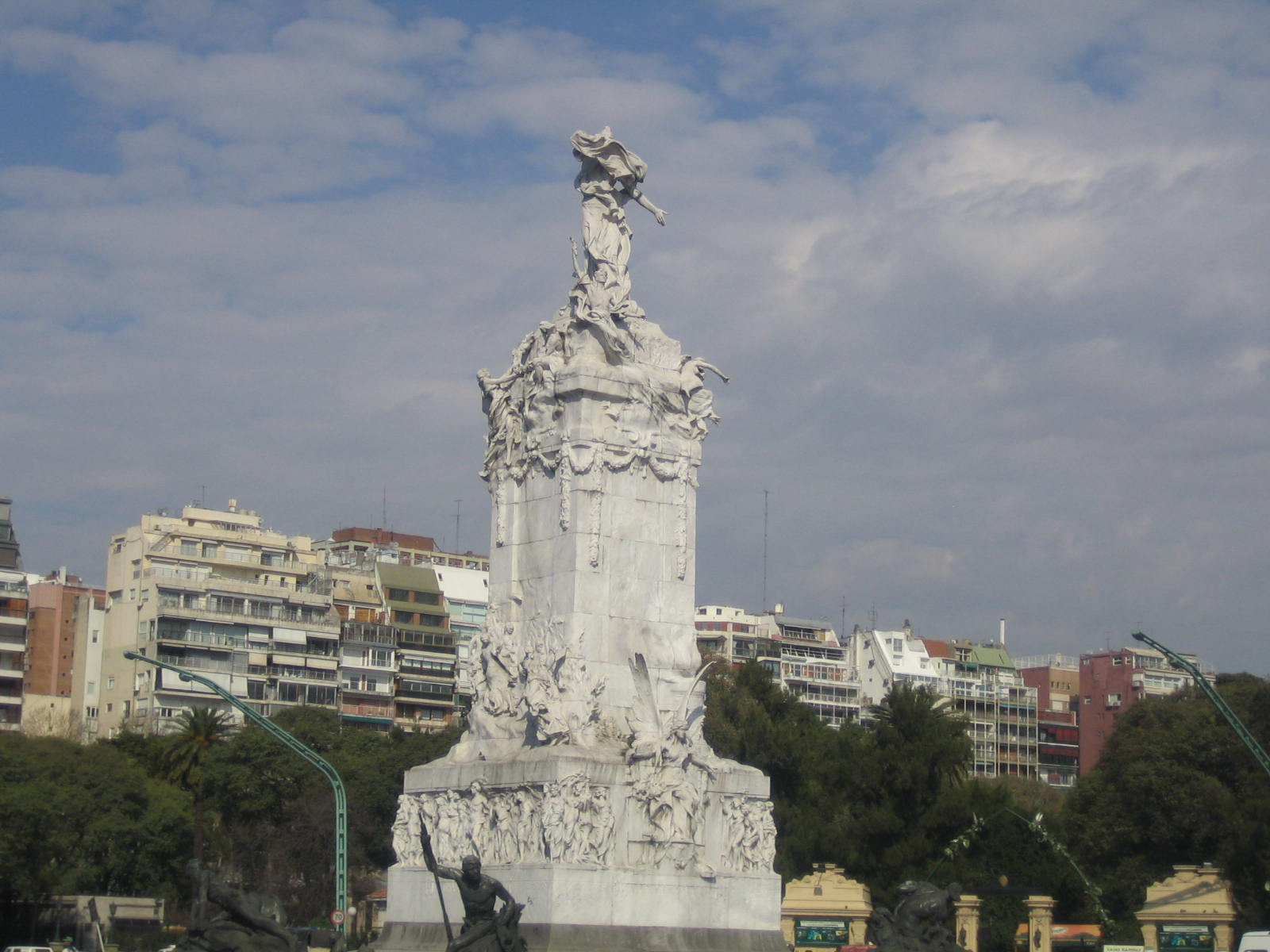
Monument to the Carta Magna and Four Regions of Argentina ("Spanish Monument")

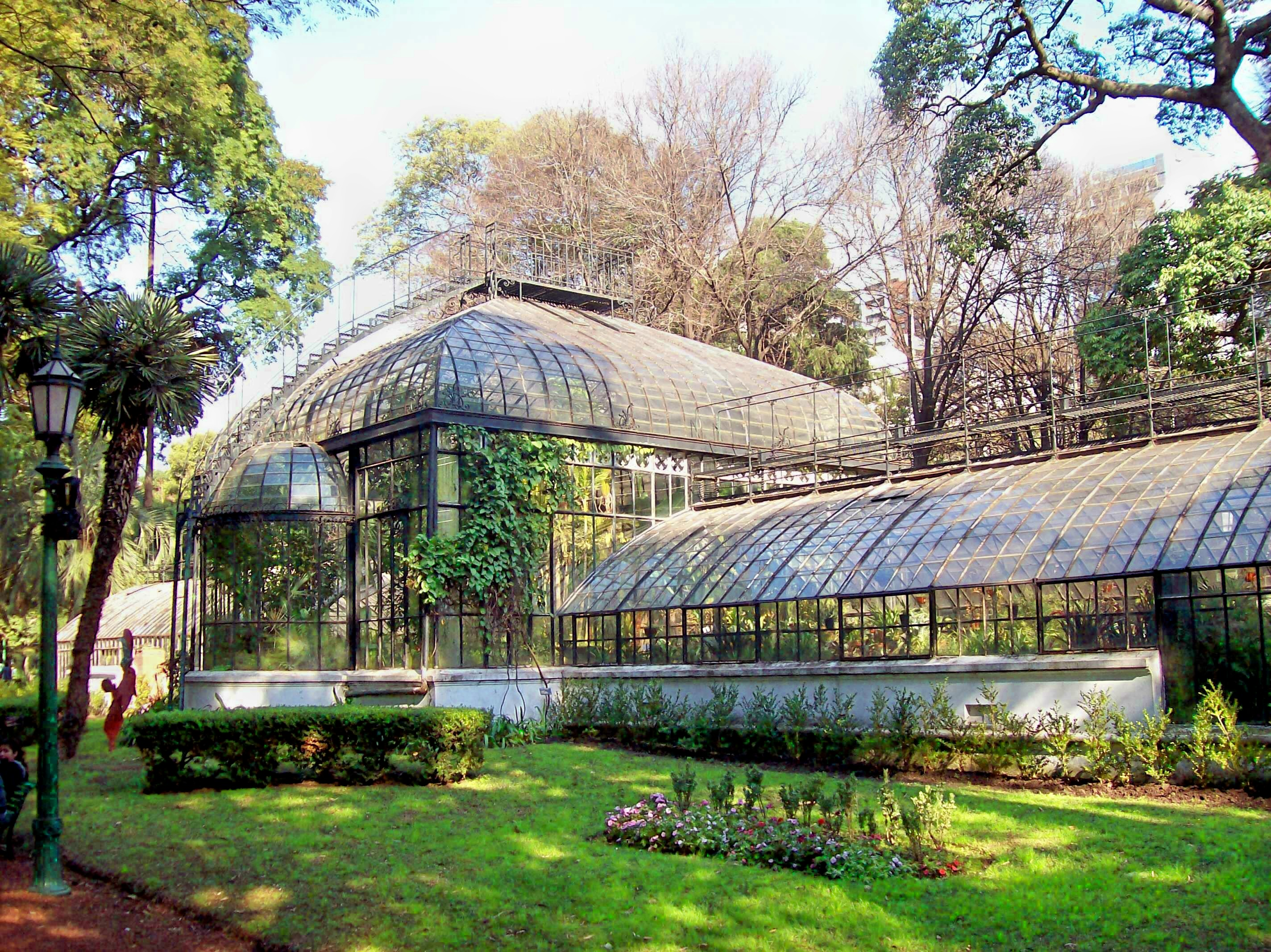
Buenos Aires Botanical Gardens

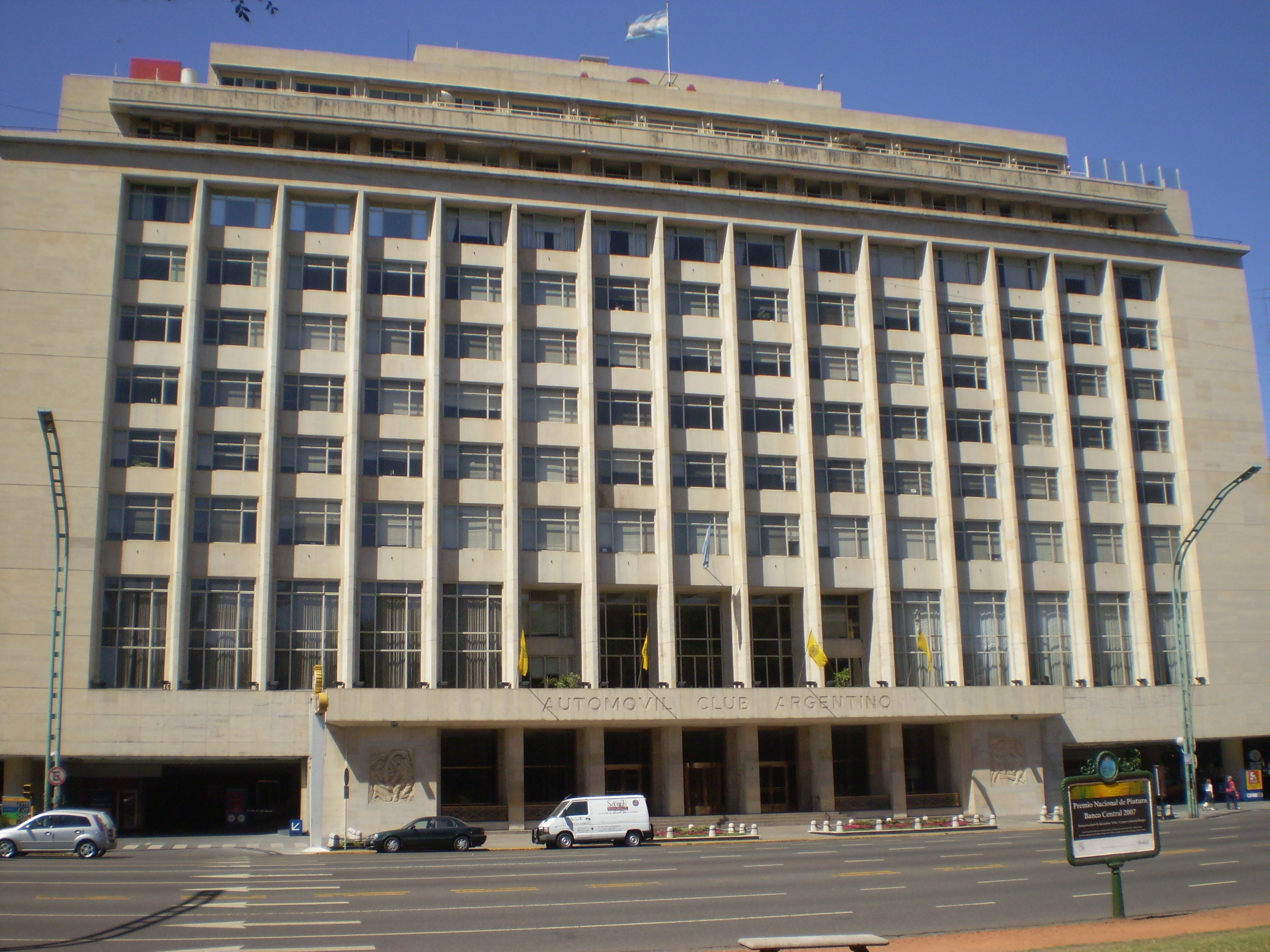
The Argentine Automobile Club

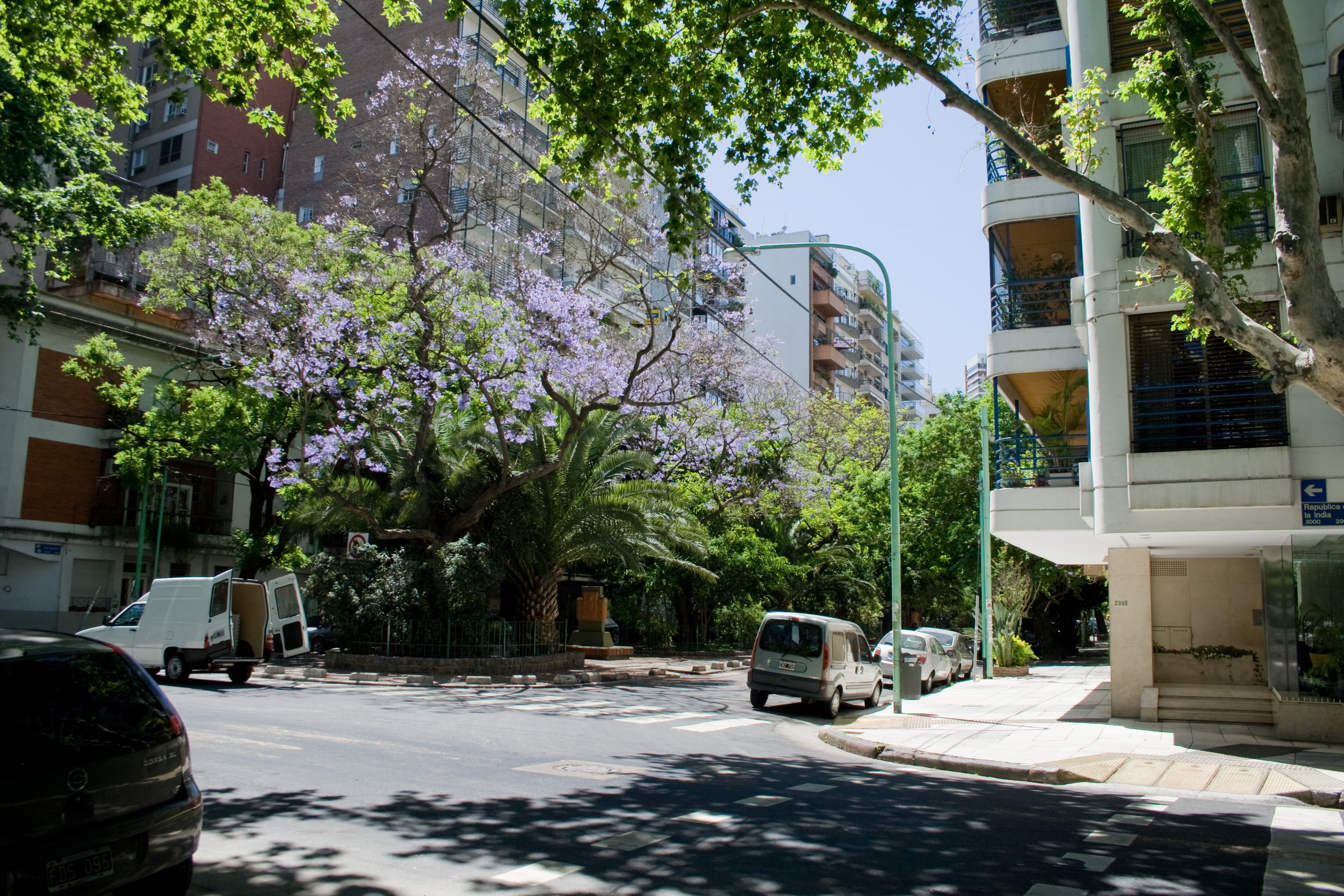
India and Cerviño Streets

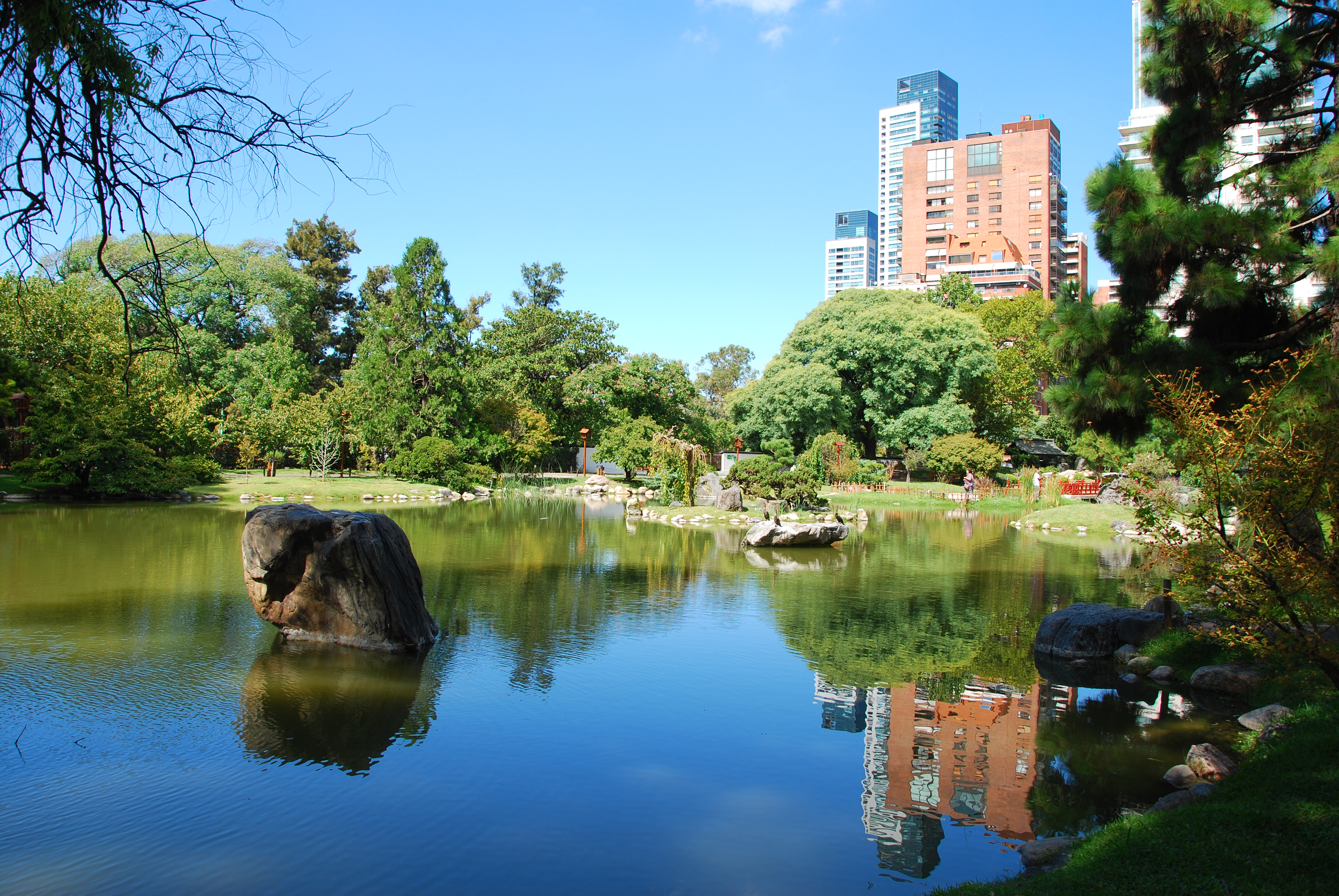
Japanese Gardens

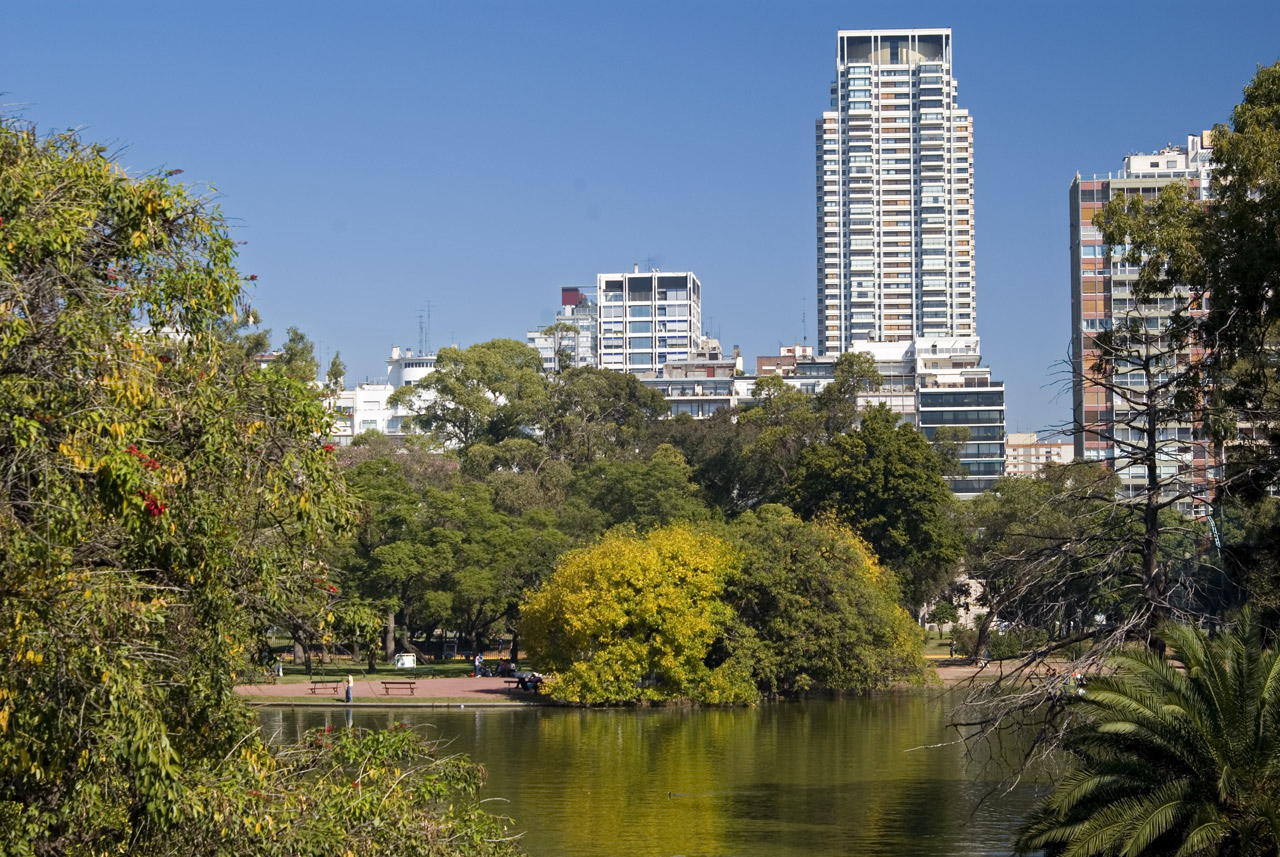
The Rose Garden Lake and Palermo Nuevo highrises

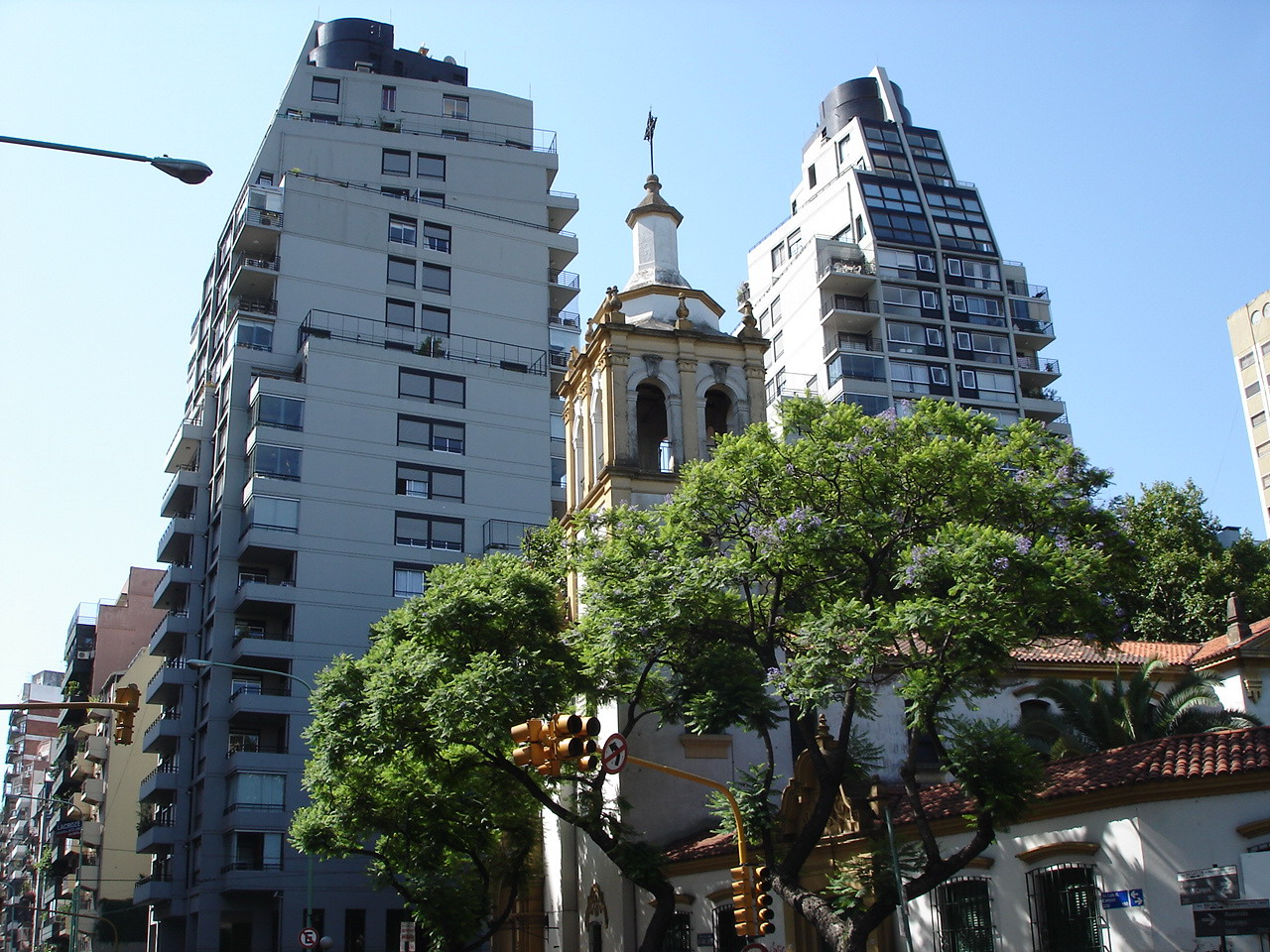
The Parish of St. Adela

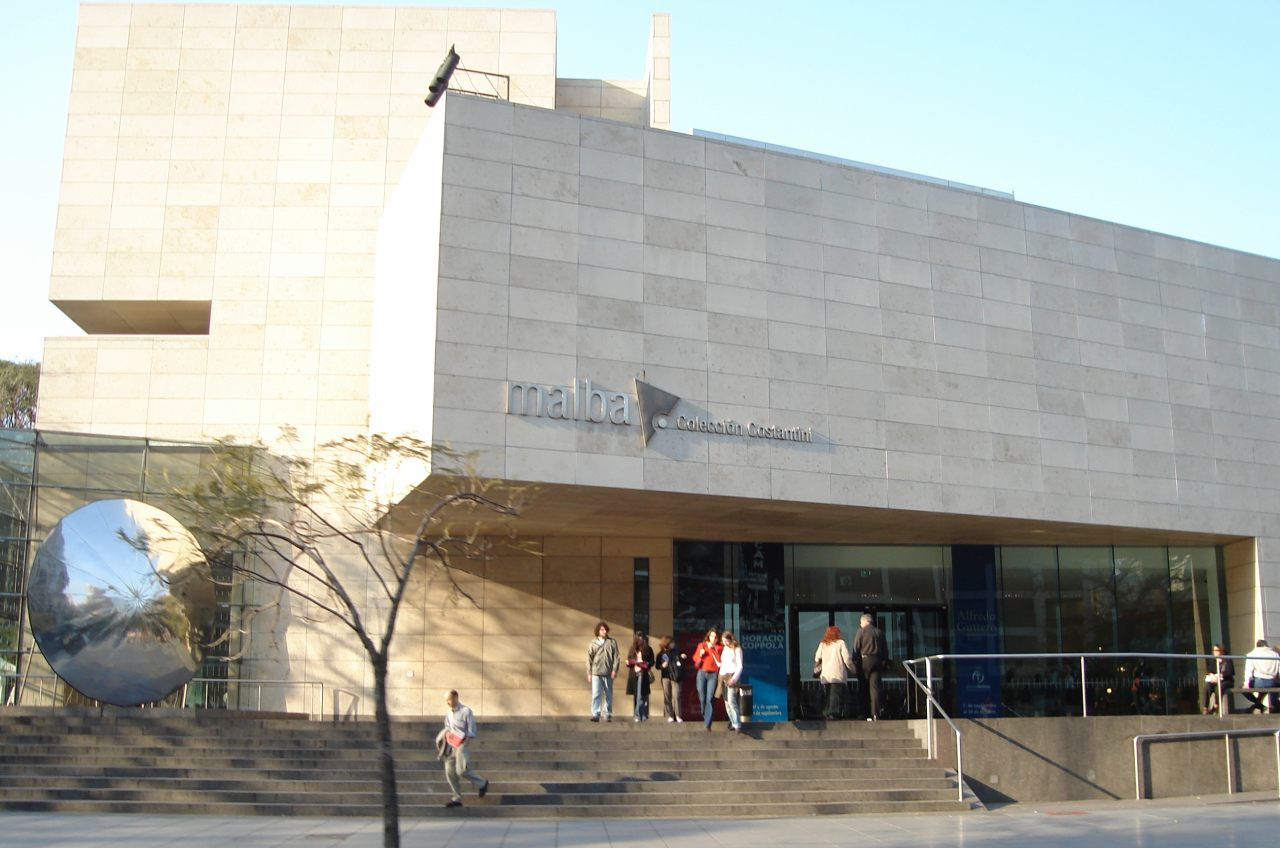
The Museum of Latin American Art

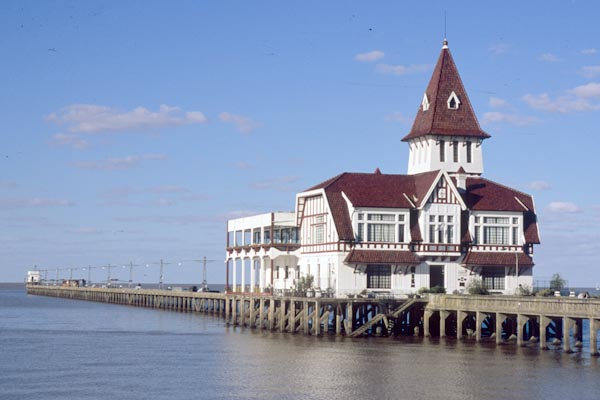
Club de Pescadores (Fishermen's Club)

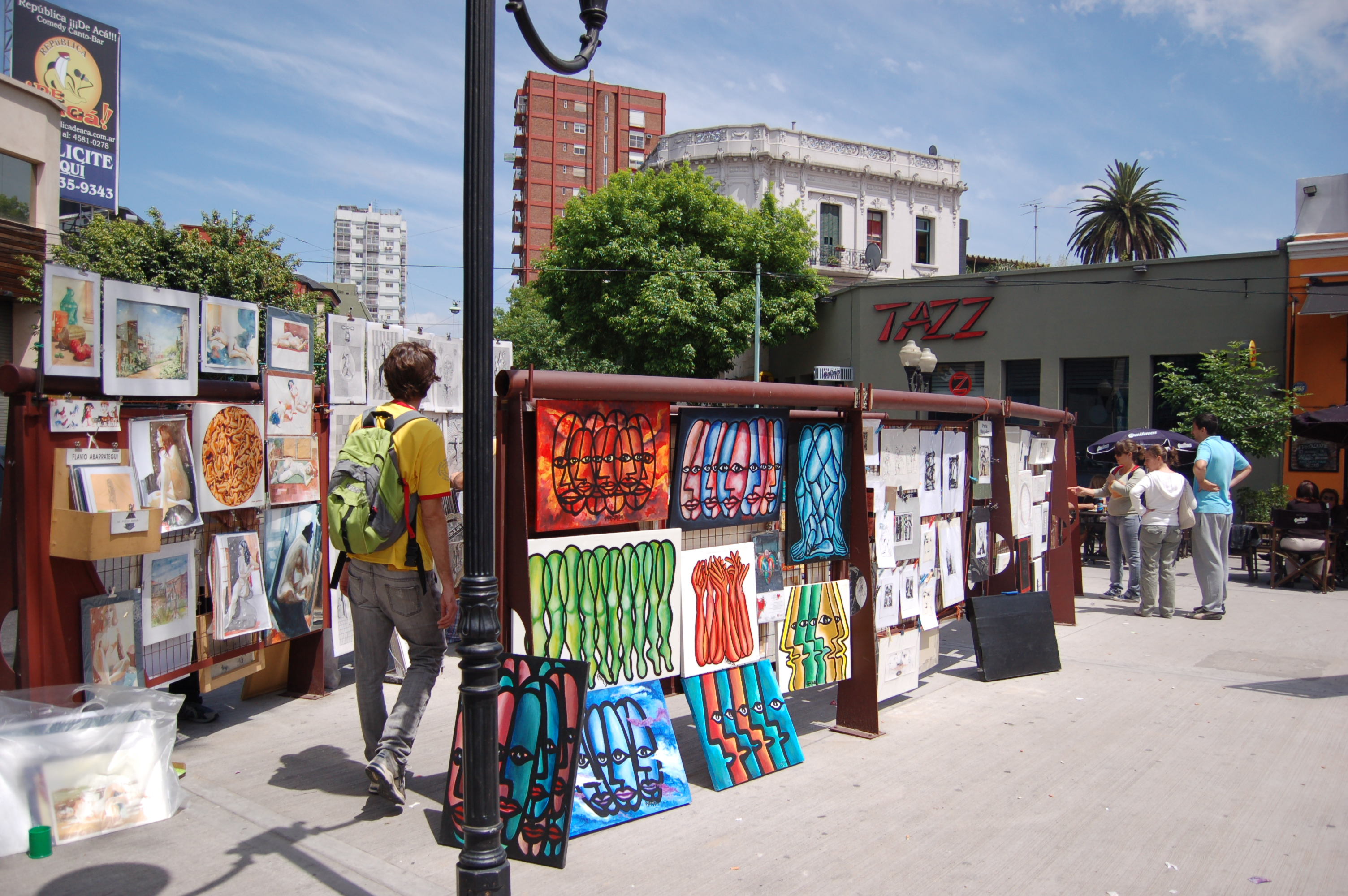
Cortázar Square

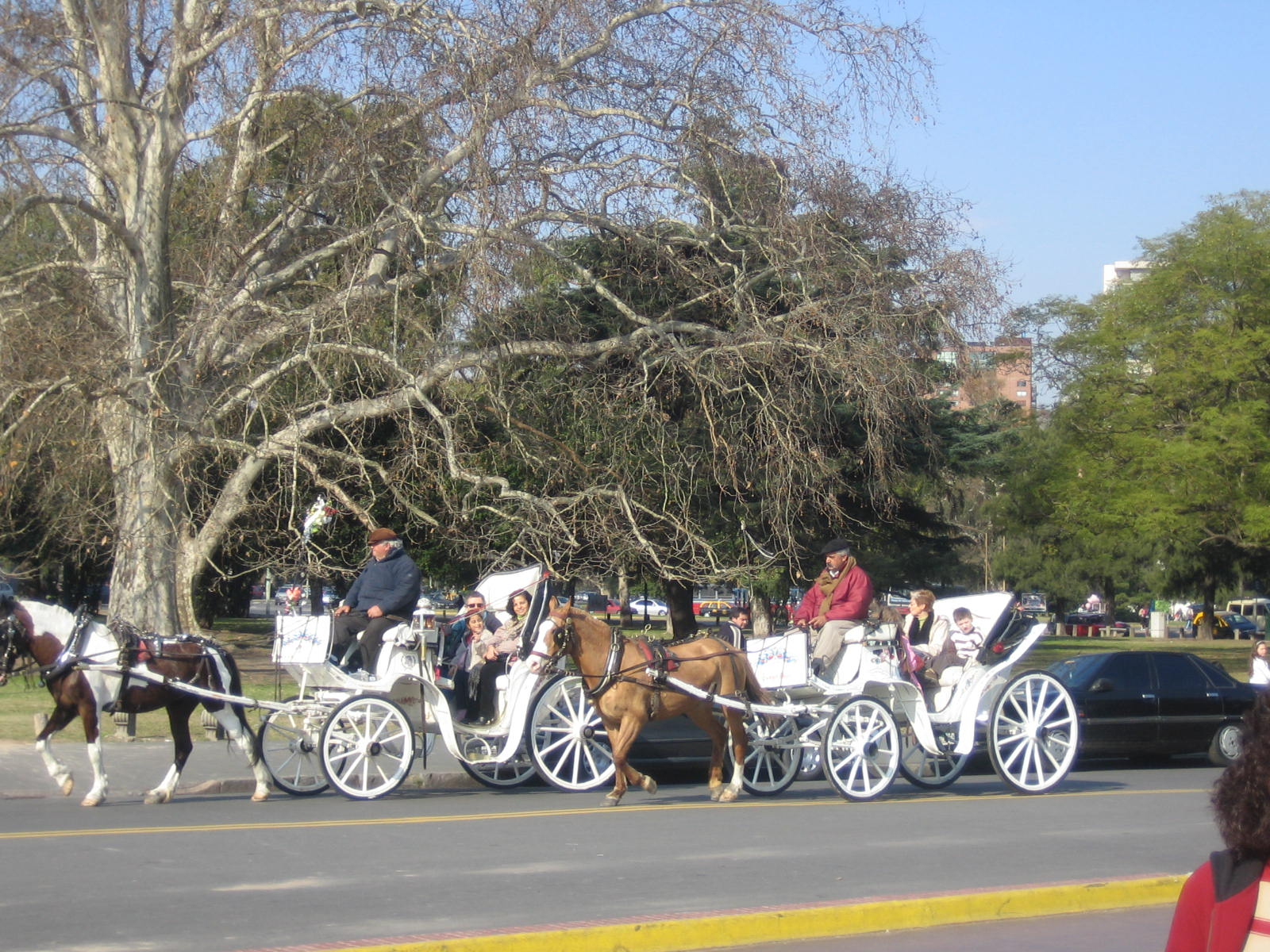
Horse-drawn buggies (mateos) near the Rose Garden

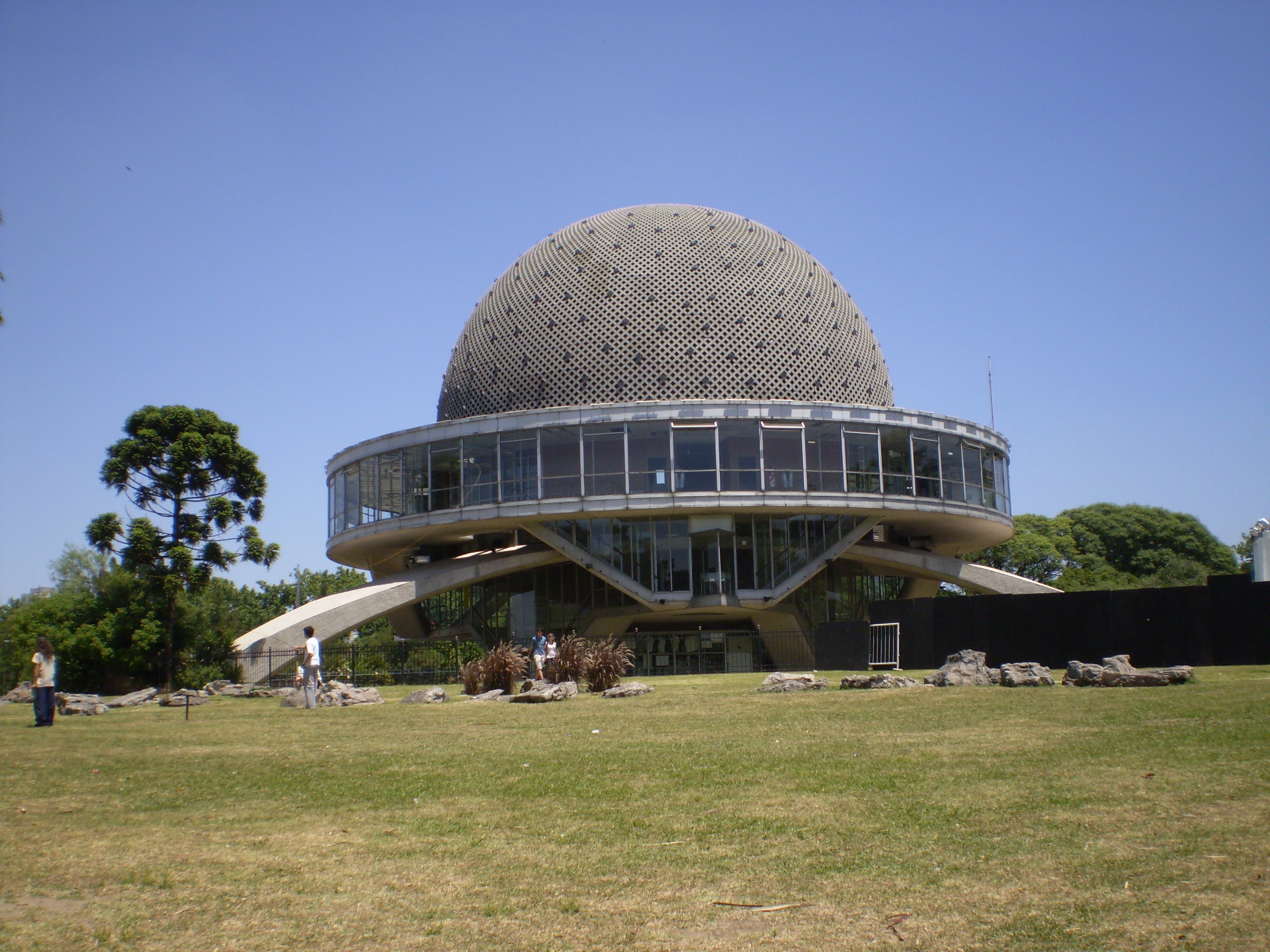
Galilei Planetarium

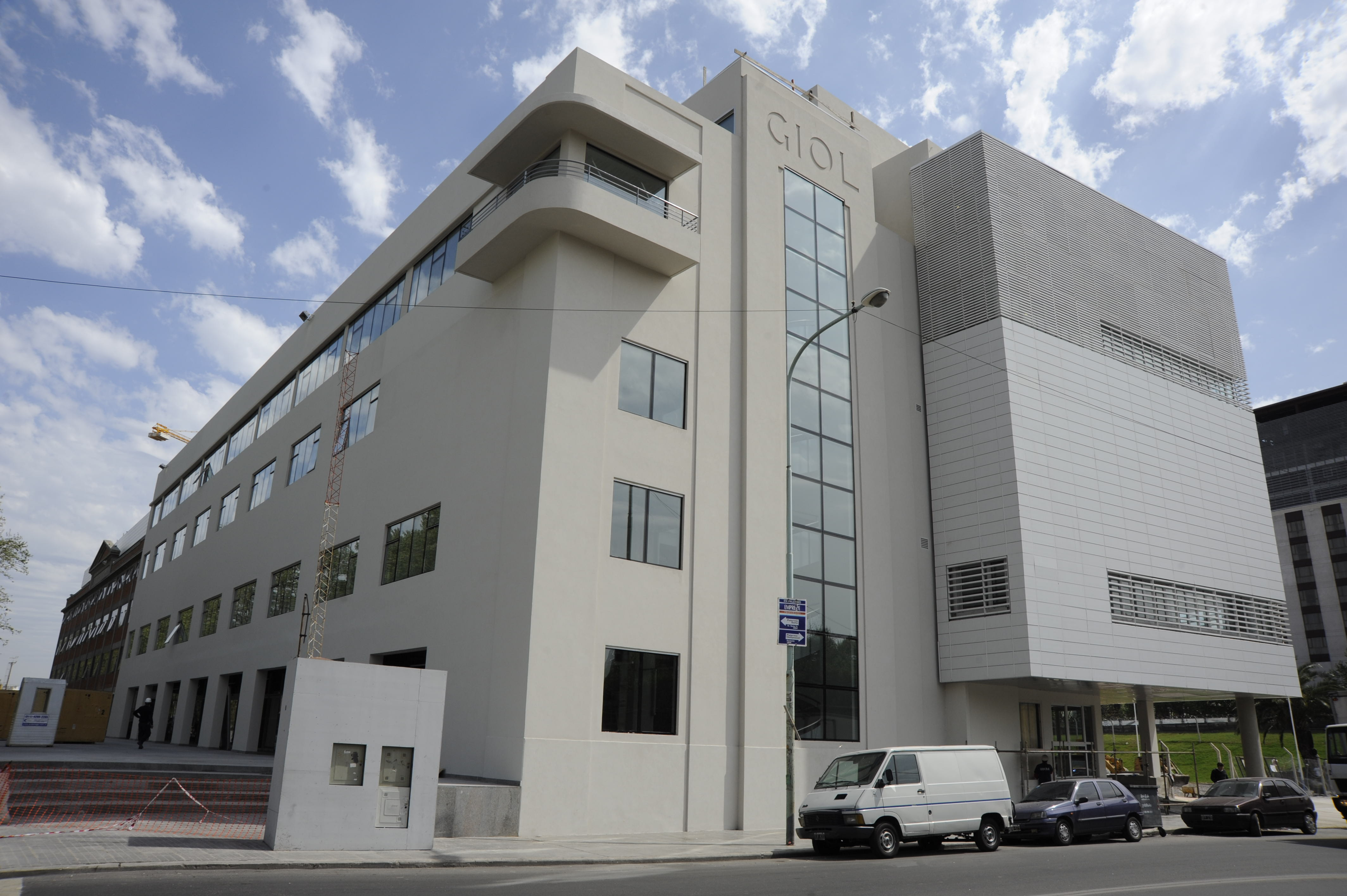
CONICET Research Center

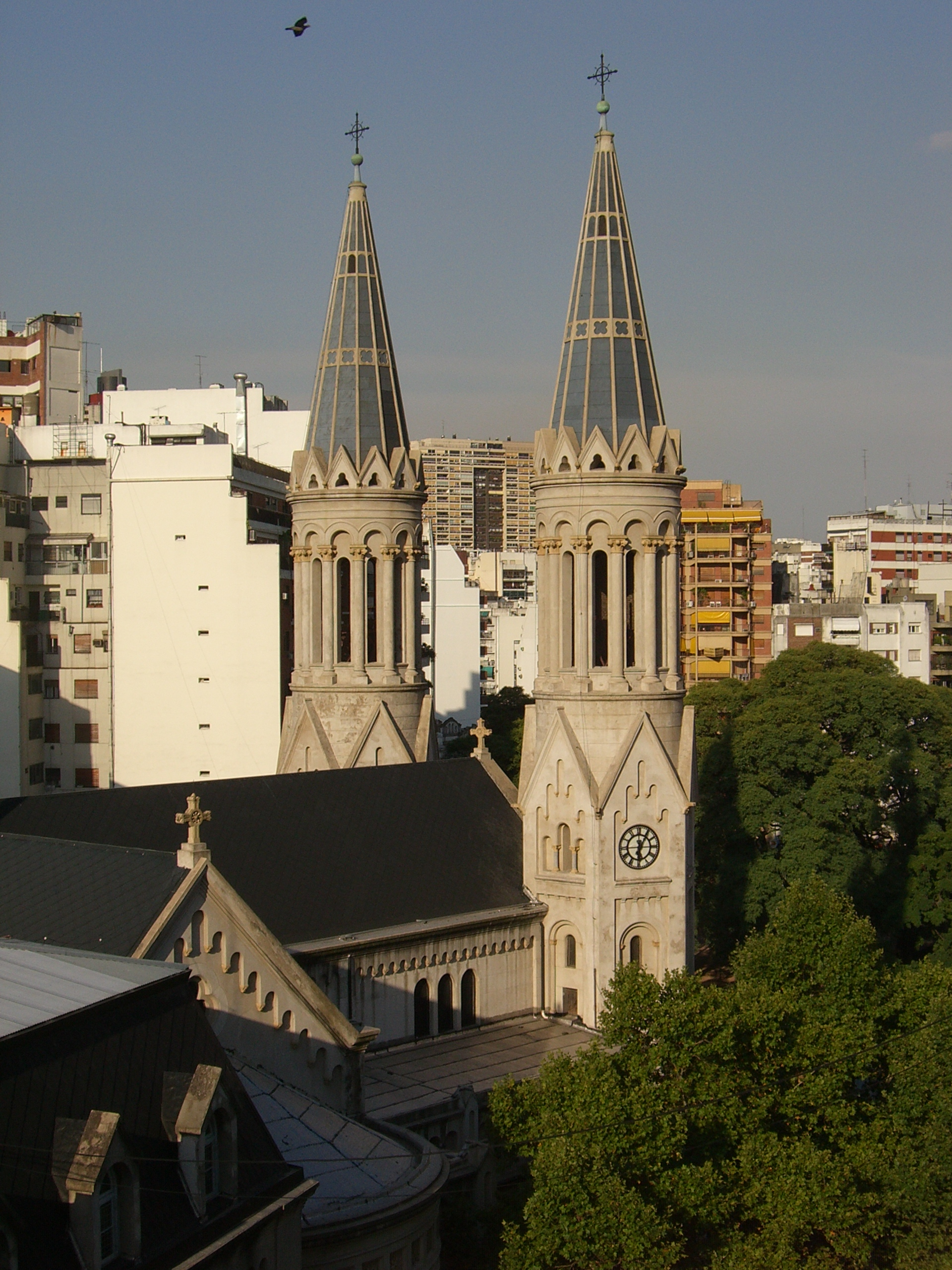
Parish of Our Lady of Guadalupe, Plaza Güemes

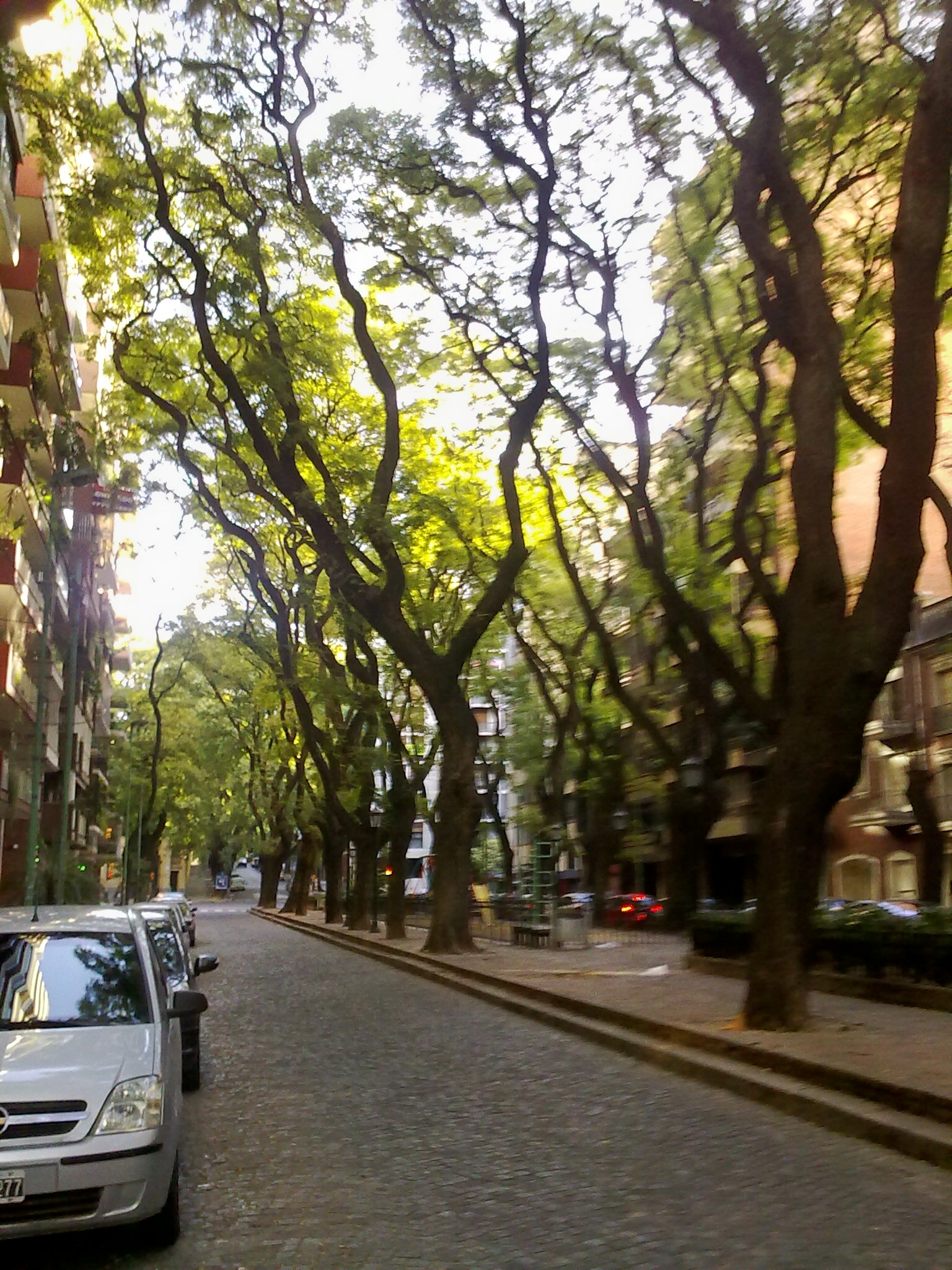
Olleros Boulevard

== Major companies based in Palermo ==
Palermo has been associated with several companies and organizations in transport, broadcasting, entertainment, agriculture, events and professional services. Some are headquartered in the neighborhood, while others operate studios, venues, offices or facilities within its boundaries.

- Aerolíneas Argentinas — Argentina's flag carrier maintains corporate offices at Aeroparque Jorge Newbery, on the northeastern edge of Palermo.
- Televisión Pública — The state-owned television broadcaster has its main building on Avenida Figueroa Alcorta, close to Palermo Chico.
- Argentine Automobile Club — The automobile association occupies a notable headquarters on Avenida del Libertador, near the entrance to the Palermo parks.
- Hipódromo Argentino de Palermo — The company operates the Palermo racecourse, a horse-racing, gaming and events complex located next to Avenida del Libertador.
- Sociedad Rural Argentina — The agricultural association is linked to the Palermo exhibition grounds and moved its institutional offices to Juncal 4450.
- La Rural — The exhibition and convention center in Palermo hosts trade fairs, agricultural shows, cultural events and business meetings.
- América TV — The free-to-air television network is part of the media cluster commonly associated with Palermo Hollywood.
- América 24 — The cable news channel belongs to the same media group as América TV and forms part of its audiovisual operations.
- C5N — The news channel opened studios and facilities on Olleros Street, within the Palermo area, after a change in its technical and visual presentation.
- Channel 9 — The television network has used facilities in Palermo Hollywood for entertainment programming and studio production.
- Ideas del Sur — The former production company founded by Marcelo Tinelli operated in Palermo before becoming one of the best-known producers of entertainment television in Argentina.
- Magic Kids — The former children's cable channel had offices on Ángel Carranza Street, in the Palermo area.
- Kuarzo Entertainment Argentina — The television production company operates from José A. Cabrera Street and produces entertainment, reality and fiction formats.
- Underground Producciones — The television and film production company has operated from Humboldt Street, one of the streets associated with Palermo Hollywood.
- Chrysler Fevre Argentina — The former automobile company was associated with the Palacio Chrysler, later known as Palacio Alcorta, on Avenida Figueroa Alcorta in Palermo Chico.
