= Argentine Automobile Club =

Largest motoring association in Argentina

Coordinates: 34°35′S 58°24′W

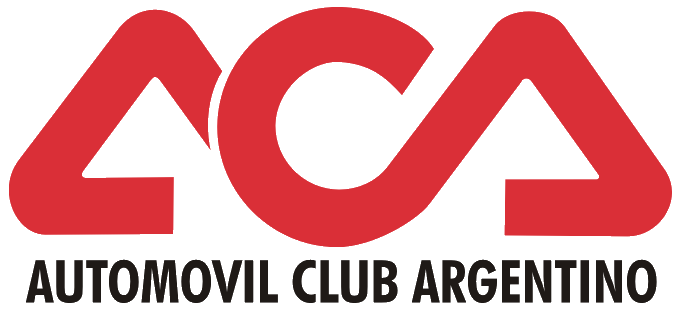
Logo of the club.

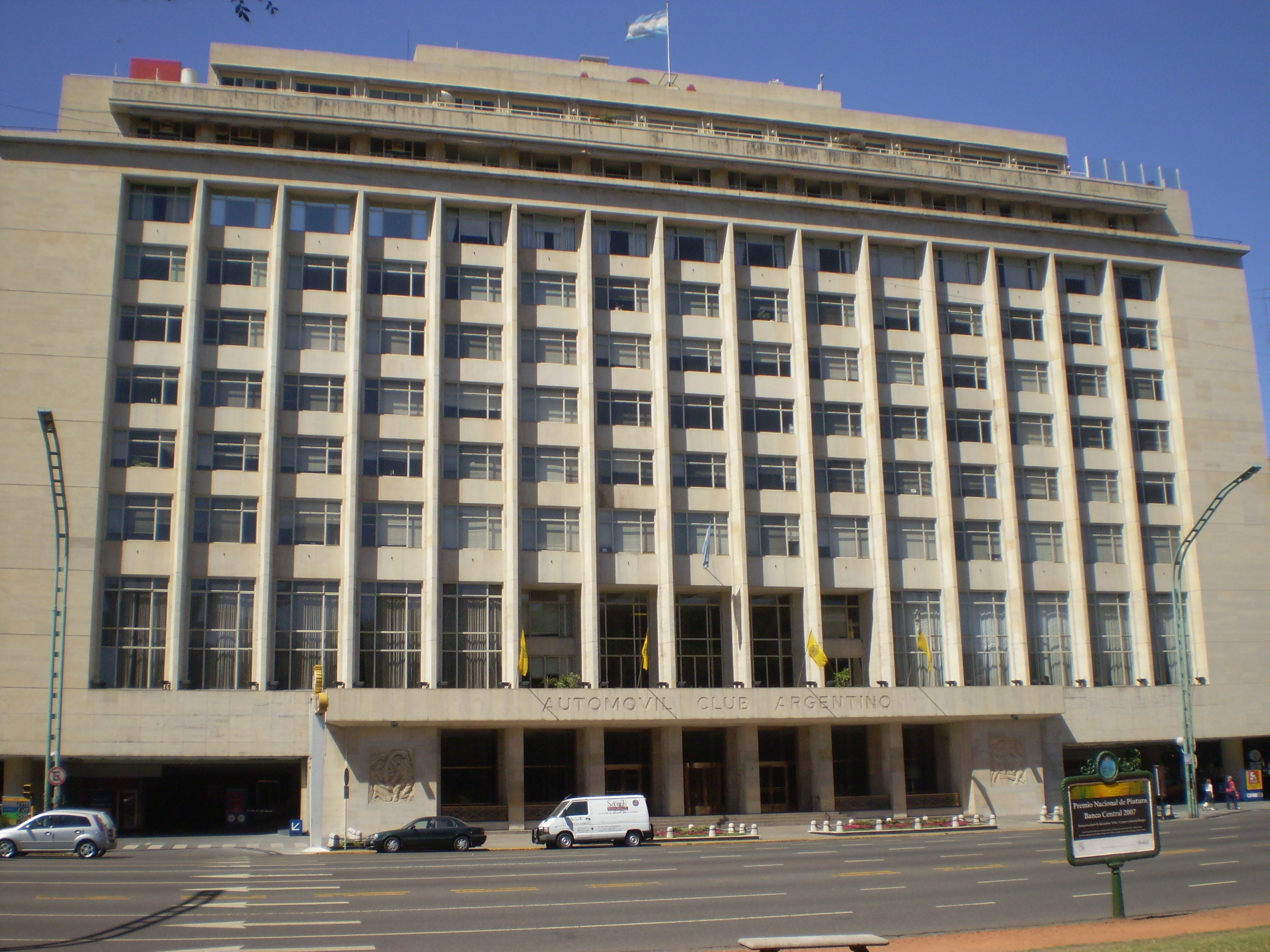
The Argentine Automobile Club building.

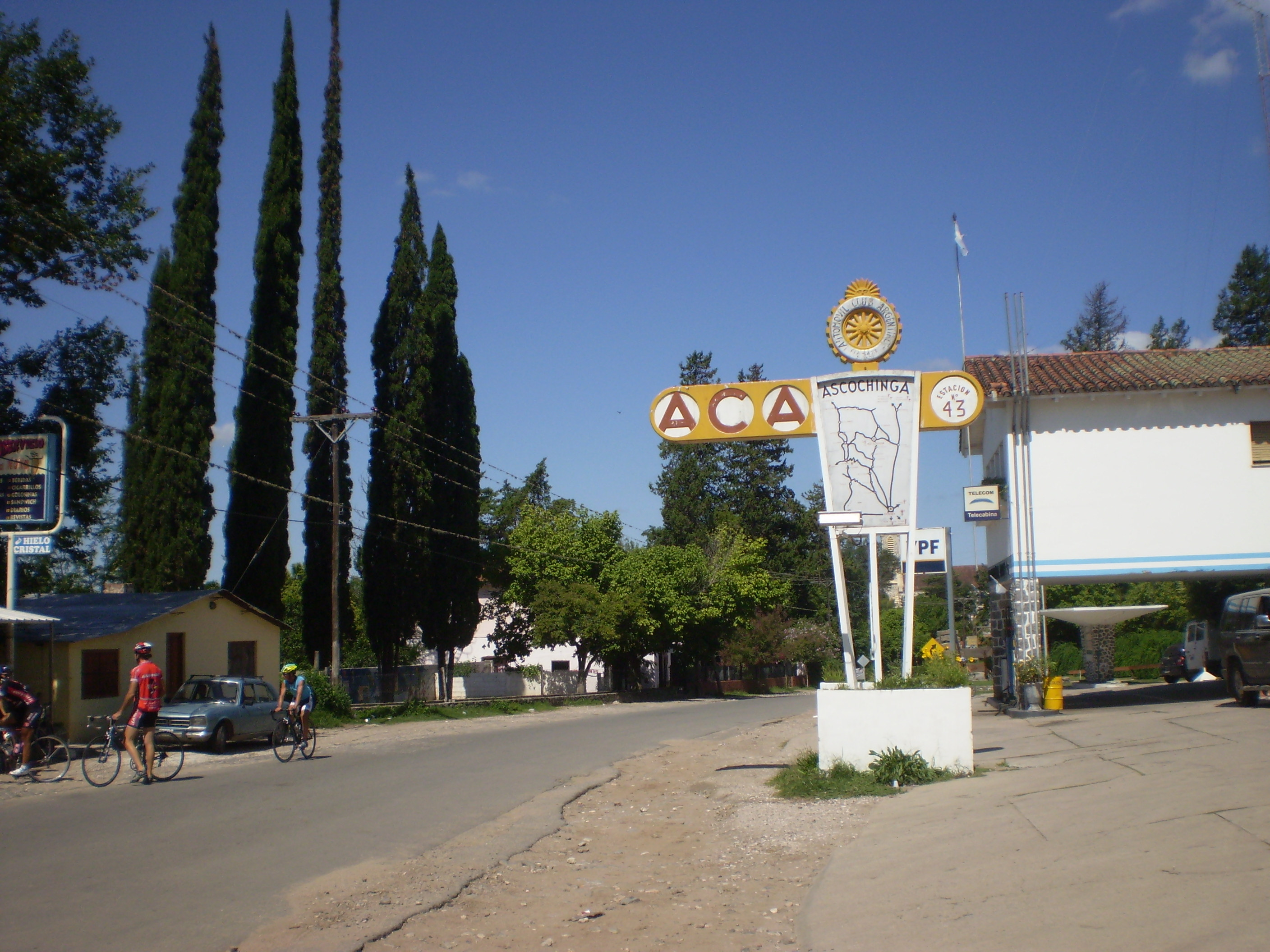
One of the ACA's network of over 230 service stations

The Argentine Automobile Club (Spanish: Automóvil Club Argentino, ACA) is Argentina's largest automobile association.

It was founded on June 11, 1904, by Dalmiro Varela Castex, who in 1892 had imported the country's first registered automobile, a Daimler, and in 1894 its second (a De Dion-Bouton). The ACA oversaw the first recorded Argentine auto racing event, in 1906, and became a member of the International Automotive Federation in 1926. It began to develop of national network of service stations following a 1936 agreement with the state oil concern, YPF. Offering its membership cartographic, roadside assistance, insurance and other services, the ACA was inducted into the International Tourism Alliance in 1952.

Its national headquarters, designed in the Rationalist style by local architect Antonio U. Vilar and collaborators Alejandro Bustillo, was completed in 1942 on Buenos Aires' Avenida del Libertador. The building and its automobile museum are Palermo neighborhood landmarks.

In 1954, the club sponsored the Mil Kilometros de la Ciudad de Buenos Aires, inviting cars from the Sports Car Club of America, including one driven by Carroll Shelby.

- Rally Argentina

== Categories in which the Club participated ==
- Formula One (Scuderia Achille Varzi)
- Formula Two (Automóvil Club Argentino)
- FIA GT Championship (Escudería ACA Argentina)

== Results ==
=== Scuderia Achille Varzi ===
(key) (Results in bold indicate pole position; results in italics indicate fastest lap; † indicates shared drive.)

Year	Chassis	Engine(s)	Tyres	Drivers	1	2	3	4	5	6	7
1950	Maserati 4CLT/48	Maserati 4CLT 1.5 L4s	**P**		GBR	MON	500	SUI	BEL	FRA	ITA
1950	Maserati 4CLT/48	Maserati 4CLT 1.5 L4s	**P**	(Argentina) José Froilán González		Ret				Ret	
1950	Maserati 4CLT/48	Maserati 4CLT 1.5 L4s	**P**	(Argentina) Alfredo Pián		DNS					
1950	Maserati 4CLT/48	Maserati 4CLT 1.5 L4s	**P**	(Italy) Nello Pagani				7			
1950	Maserati 4CLT/48	Maserati 4CLT 1.5 L4s	**P**	(Switzerland) Toni Branca				11			
