= Buenos Aires Botanical Garden =

Botanical garden in Buenos Aires, Argentina

- Jardín Botánico de Buenos Aires
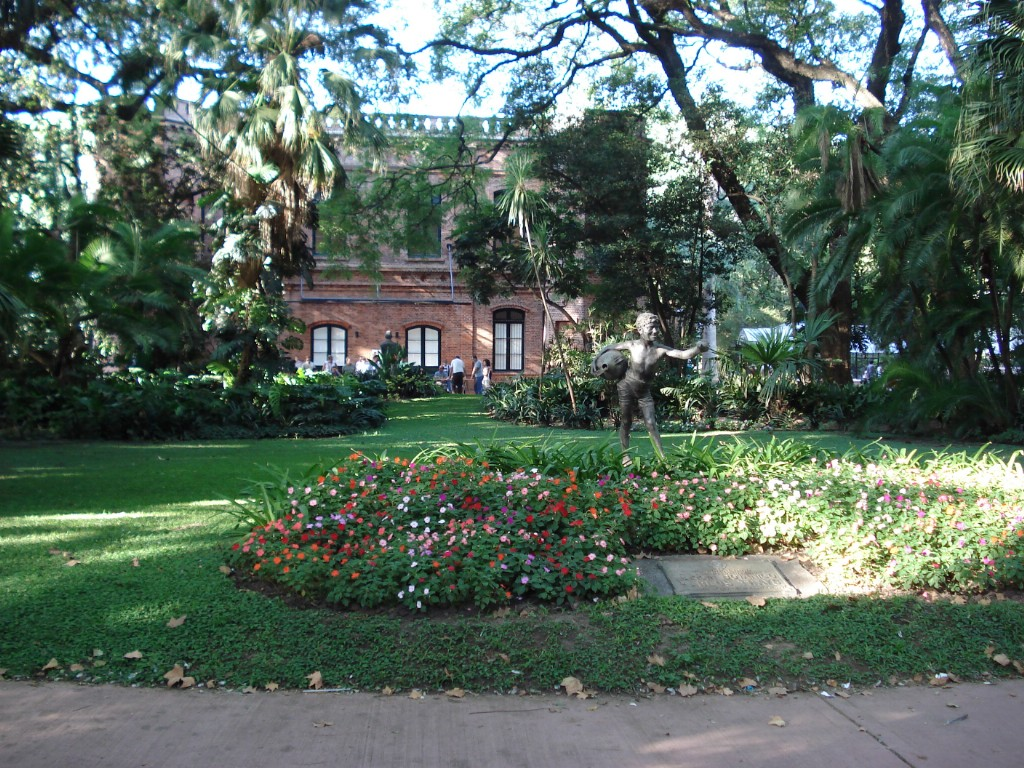
- Entrance to the gardens
- Interactive map of Buenos Aires Botanical Garden
- Location: Buenos Aires, Argentina
- Coordinates: 34°34′57″S 58°25′07″W
- Area: 6.9772 ha (0.026939 sq mi; 17.241 acres)

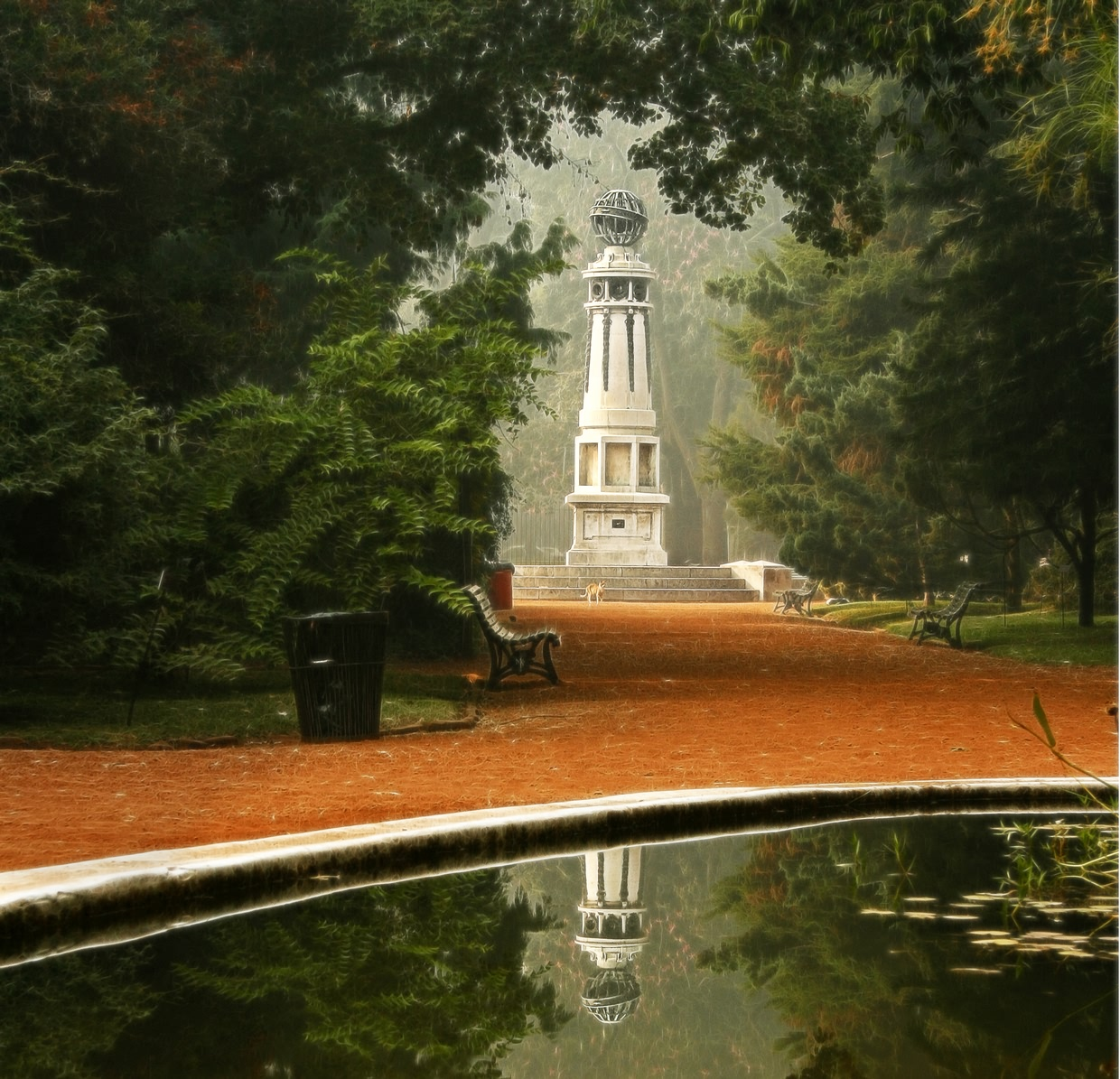
A weather indicator, designed by José Marcovich and donated by the local Austro-Hungarian community in 1910

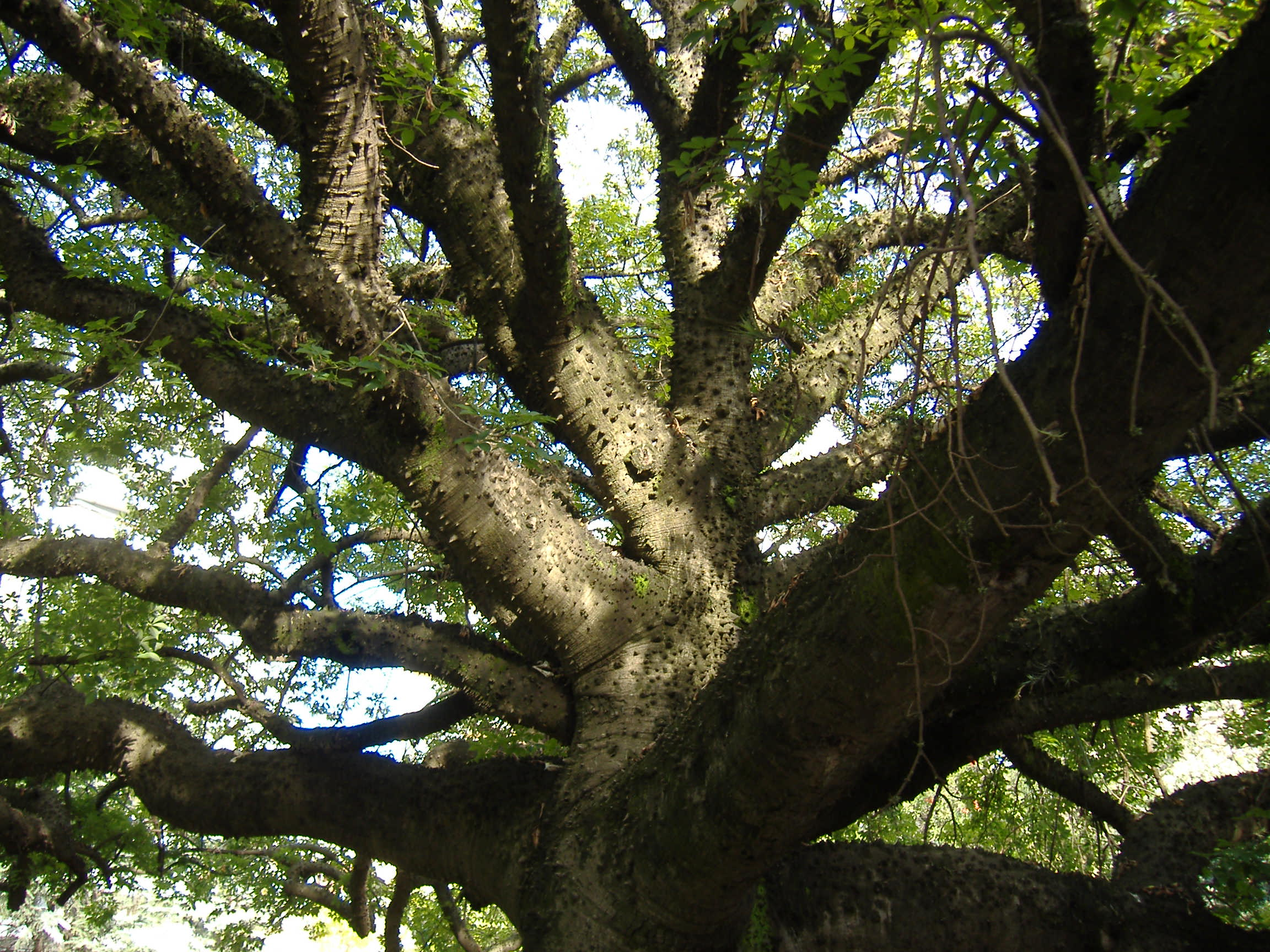
Chorisia speciosa (Palo Borracho), also called floss silk tree

The Buenos Aires Botanical Garden (official name in Spanish: Jardín Botánico Carlos Thays de la Ciudad Autónoma de Buenos Aires) is a botanical garden located in the Palermo neighborhood of Buenos Aires in Argentina. The garden is triangular in shape, and is bounded by Santa Fe Avenue, Las Heras Avenue and República Árabe Siria Street.

The garden, which was declared a national monument in 1996, has a total area of 6.9772 ha (0.026939 sq mi; 17.241 acres), and holds approximately 5,500 species of plants, trees and shrubs, as well as a number of sculptures, monuments and five greenhouses.

== Origin ==
Designed by French architect and landscape designer Carlos Thays, the garden was inaugurated on September 7, 1898. Thays and his family lived in an English style mansion, located within the gardens, between 1892 and 1898, when he served as director of parks and walks in the city. The mansion, built in 1881, is currently the main building of the complex.

== Collections ==
The park has three distinct landscape gardening styles; the symmetric, the mixed and the picturesque, recreated in the Roman, French and Oriental gardens.

=== Roman garden ===
This holds species of tree that the first century Roman botanist Pliny the Younger had in his villa in the Apennine Mountains, such as cypresses, poplars, and laurels.

=== French garden ===
This has a symmetric French style of the 17th and 18th century.

=== Oriental garden ===
In other areas the plants are ordered by origin; from Asia can be seen Ginkgo biloba; from Oceania Acacias, Eucalyptus and Casuarinas; from Europe oaks and hazelnut trees; from Africa brackens and palms.

=== Argentinean Indigenous Americas garden ===
There are an abundant collection of flora from Argentina and the Southern Cone present in the design, such as Araucaria and Blue Patagonian Spruce, and evergreen trees. In other sections plant species are systematically ordered by their taxonomic qualification. There are also other plantae from the Americas, such as sequoias from United States and "Palo Borracho" Chorisia speciosa, also called Floss silk tree from Brazil and Northern Argentina.

== Installations ==
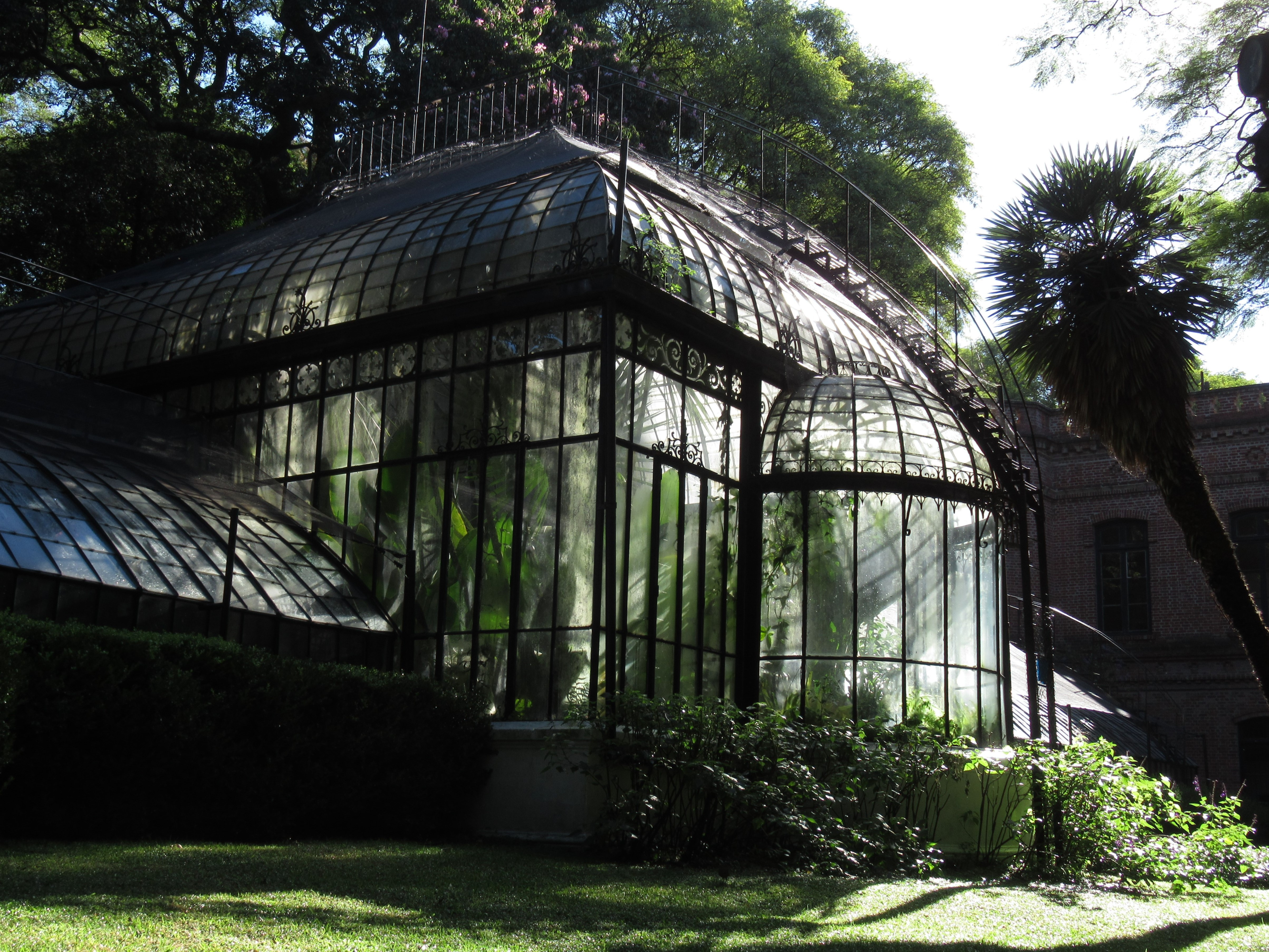
Greenhouse.

Within the garden is the Municipal Gardening School Cristóbal María Hicken, which is linked to the Faculty of Agronomy of the University of Buenos Aires. The garden also contains 33 artistic works including sculptures, busts and monuments. Among these are Los primeros Fríos by the Catalan sculptor Blay y Fábregas, Sagunto by Querol y Subirats, Figura de mujer by Lola Mora, and Saturnalia made in bronze by Ernesto Biondi.

Other attractions include the five winter-houses, the biggest of which is in Art Nouveau style and received recognition in the Paris Universal Exhibition in 1889. It has a length of 35 m (115 ft), a width of 8 metres (26 ft), contains 2500 tropical plants and is considered to be the only winter-house in that style still conserved in the world.

There is also a monument entitled Indicador Meteorológico (Weather Indicator), designed by José Markovich, and presented by the Austro-Hungarian Empire community for the Exposición Internacional del Centenario (1910).

The Botanic Library has 1,000 books and 10,000 publications from all parts of the world, which are freely available to visitors. The park also contains a Botanical Museum.

== Cat population ==
In recent years, the Botanical Garden has become home to a large population of cats. The cats are not feral animals born in the Garden, but are all domestic cats abandoned there by owners who wished for unknown reasons to get rid of their household cats. Garden authorities and security personnel have so far been unable to check the regular abandonment of unwanted household cats. Projects to remove the cats have been rejected due to objection from neighbors and animal protection agencies. Removal of the existing cats would not solve the problem of the cat population in the Garden, since, in summer, abandonment rates are as high as one cat per day. Thanks to the dedication of volunteers in the animal protection community who formed a voluntary committee, a humane temporary solution became possible. Cats are allowed to live in the Garden; the volunteer committee feeds the cats, puts them up for adoption and provides vaccines and veterinary care for them, and organizes castration operatives, sometimes with the cooperation of the Instituto de Zoonosis Luis Pasteur.

== Gallery ==
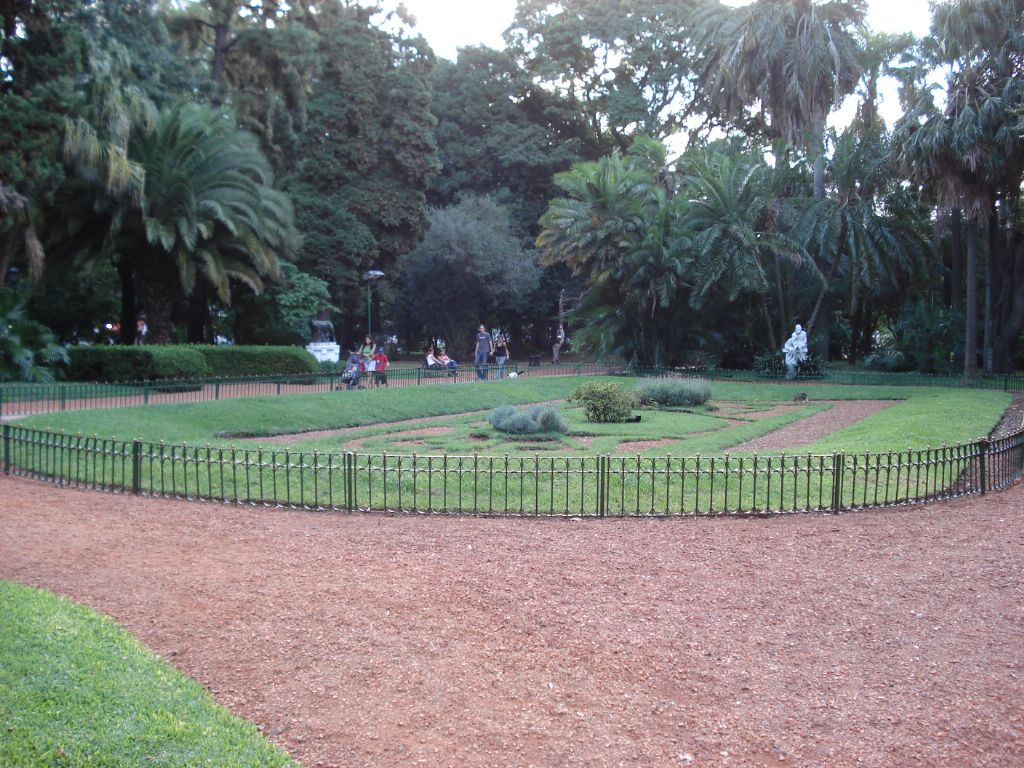

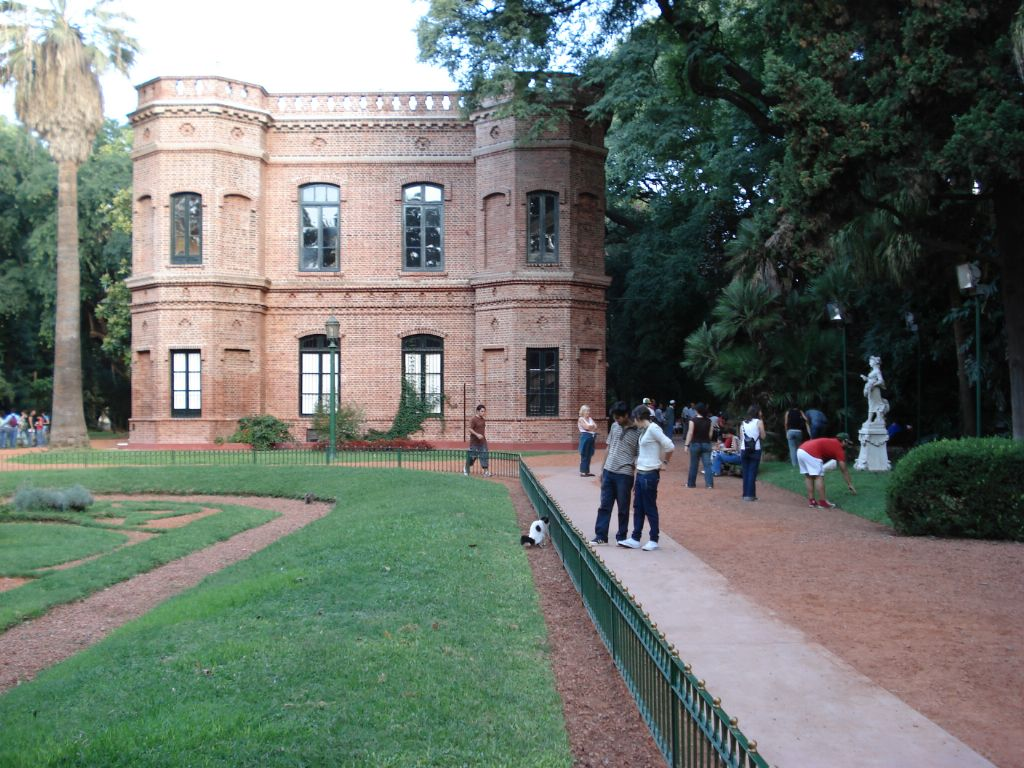

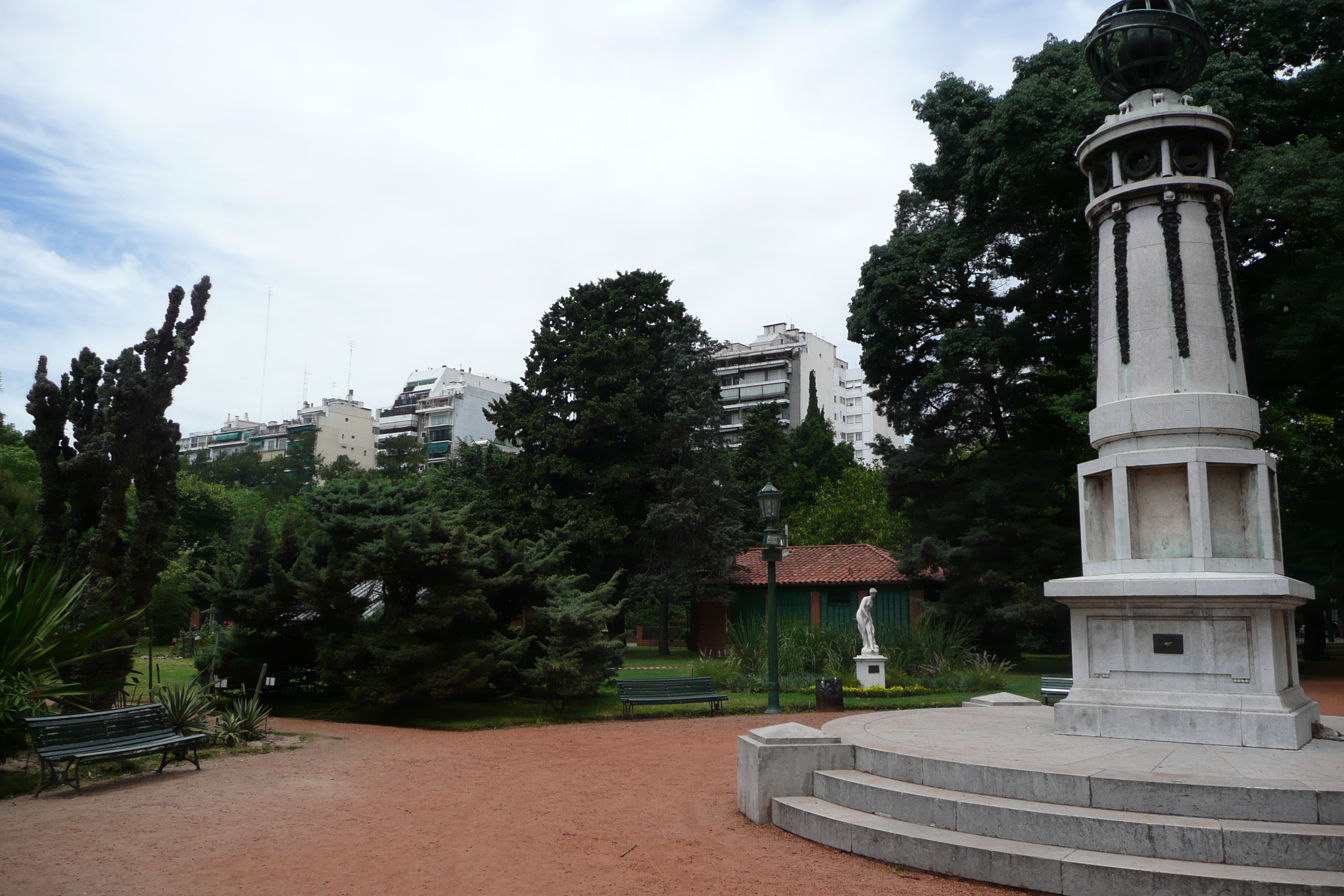

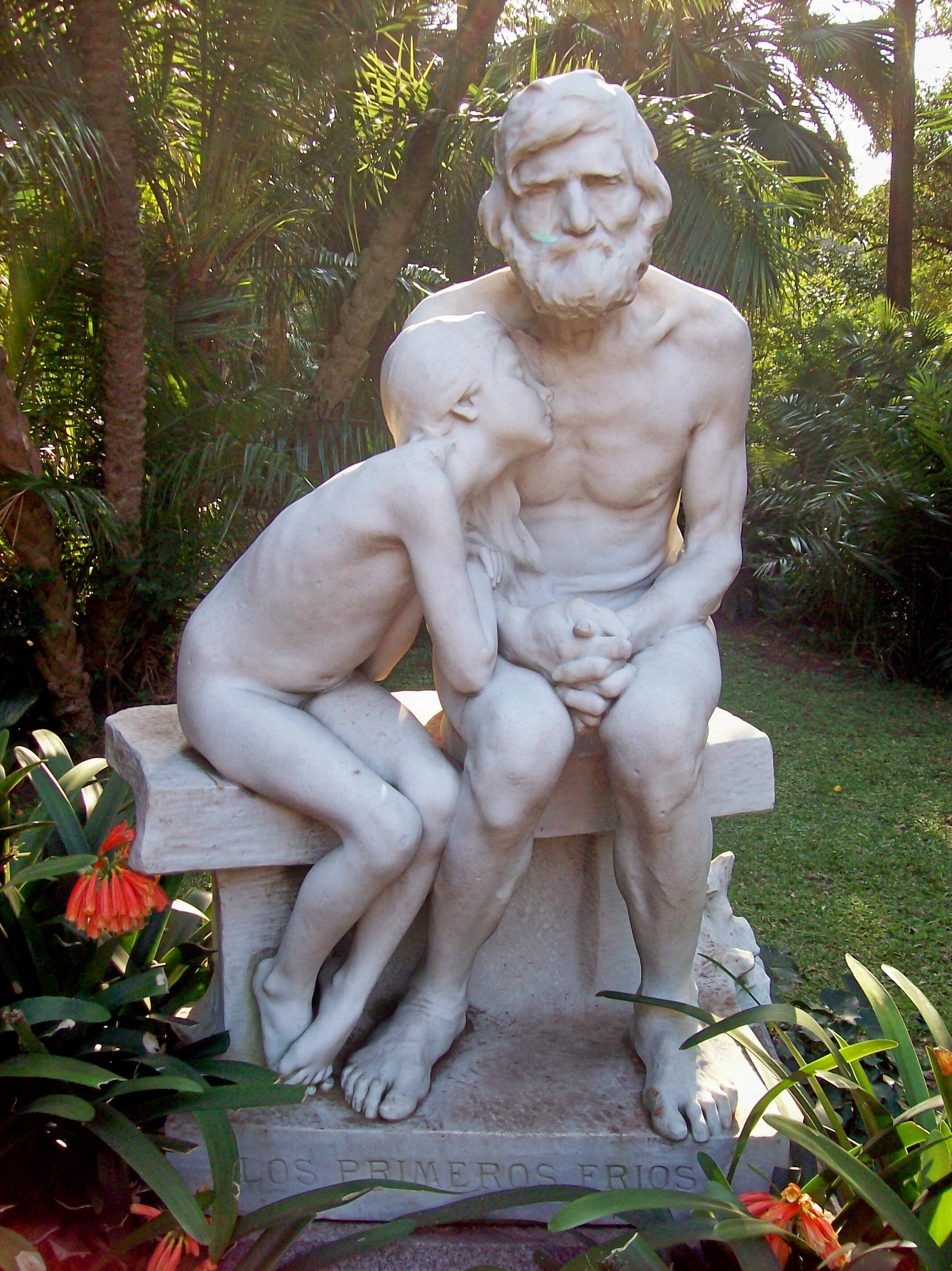

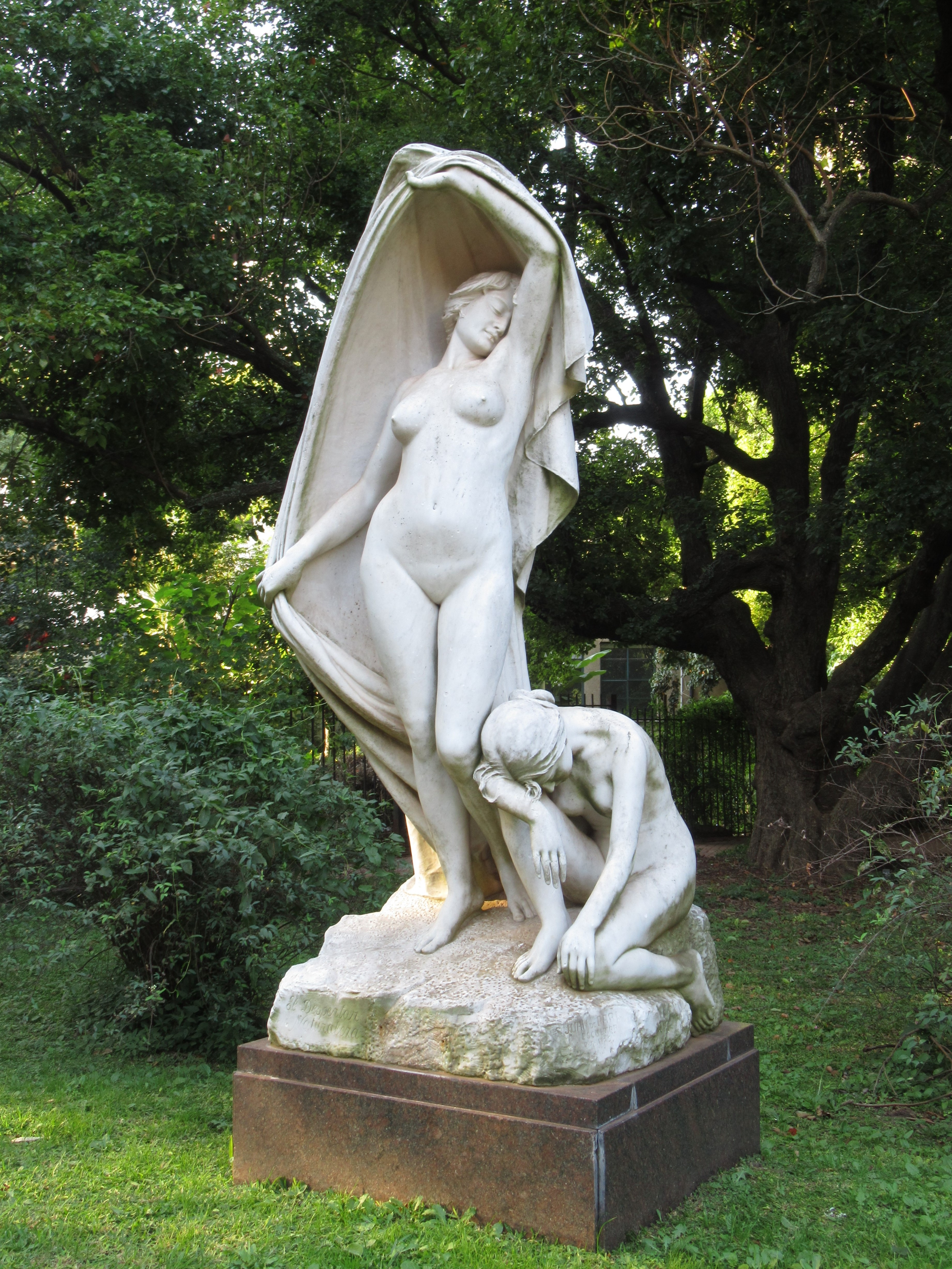

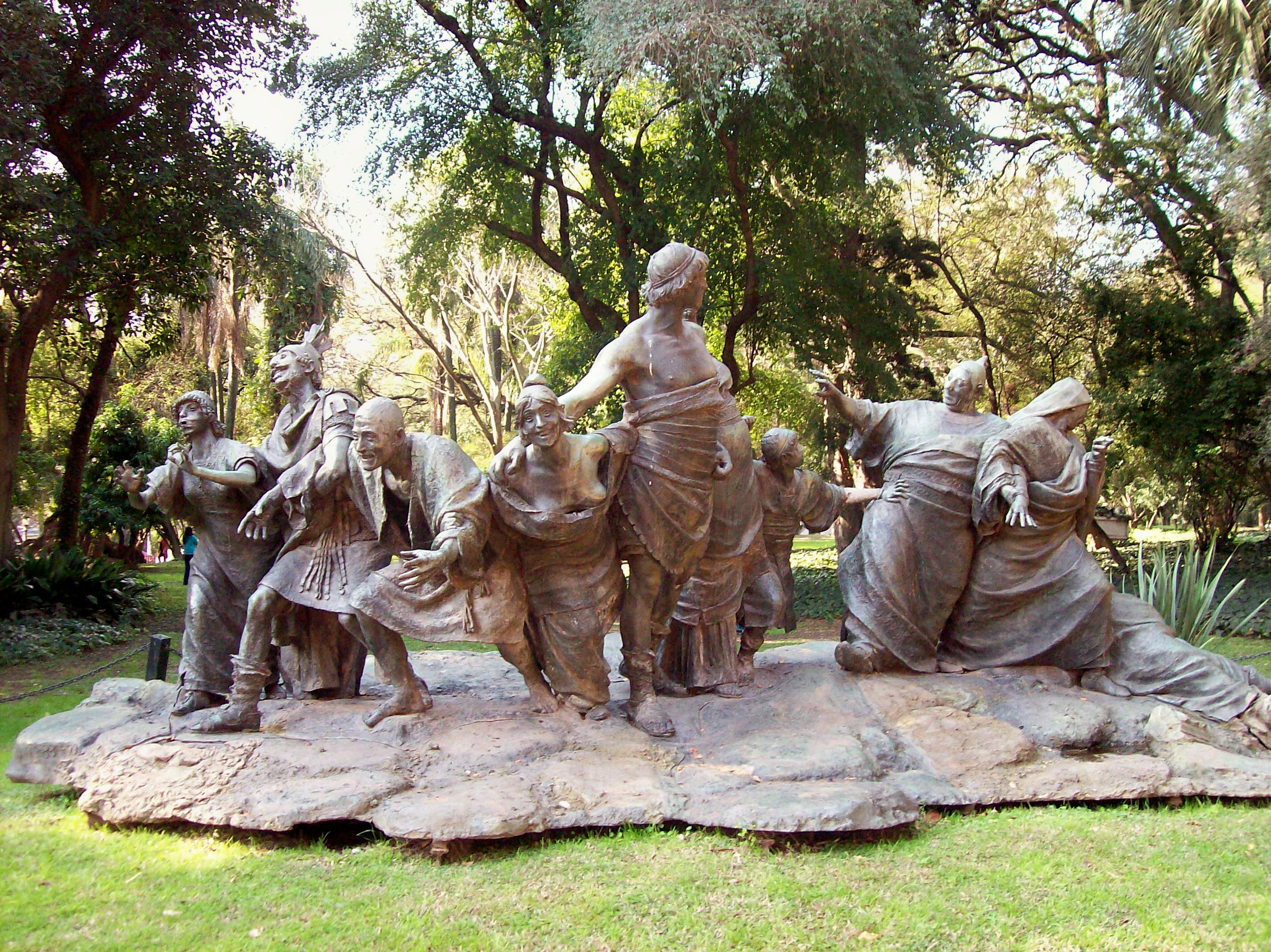

== See also ==
- Botany

== Bibliography ==
- Mimi Böhm – Buenos Aires, Art Nouveau - Ediciones Xavier Verstraeten - Buenos Aires, (2005)
- Armando T. Hunziker – Flora Fanerogámica Argentina - Raymond Sutton Books - (1997) ISSN 0040-0262
