= Argentine Automobile Club building =

Coordinates: 34.58291227740021°S 58.40000100205131°W

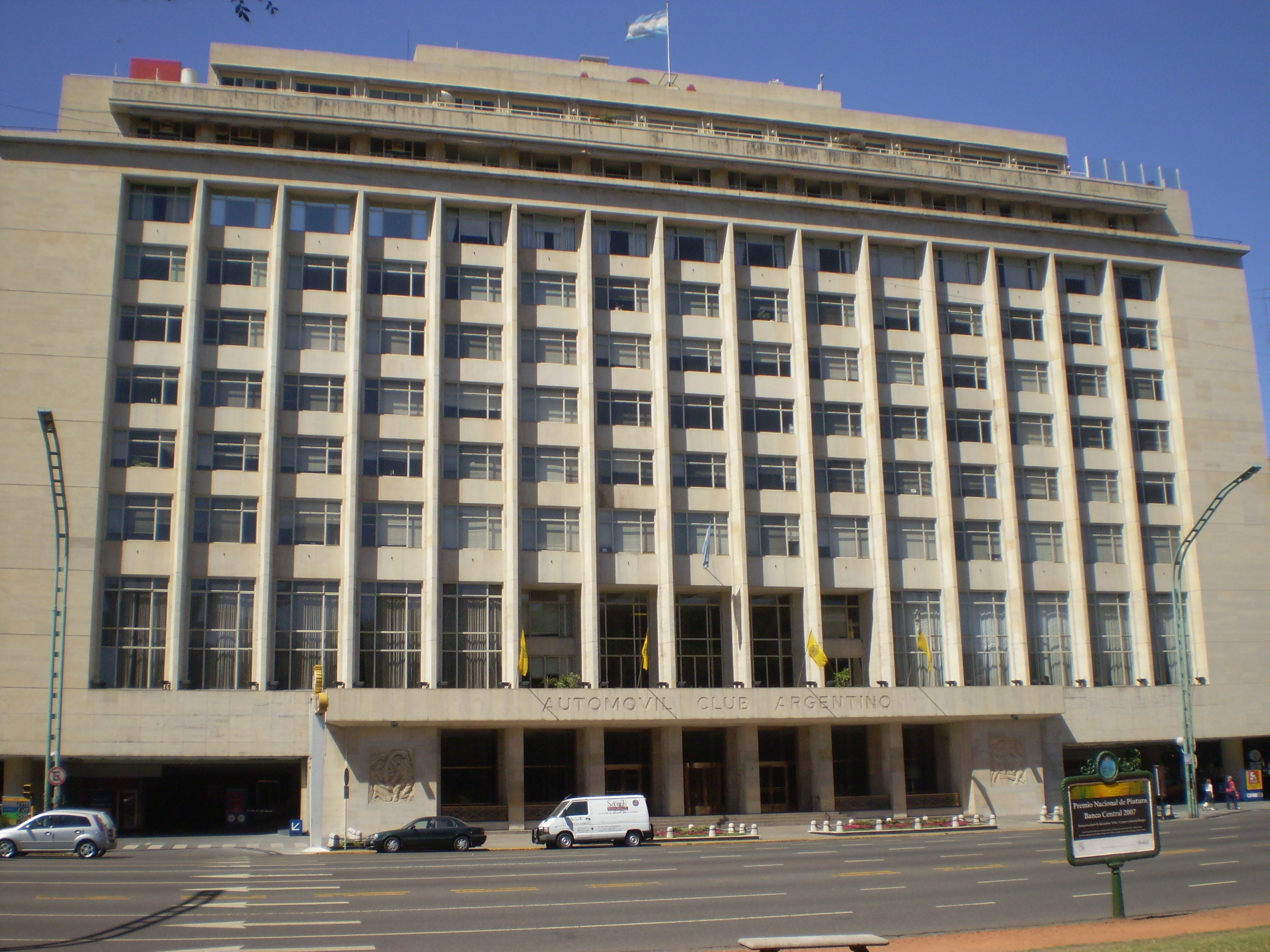
The Argentine Automobile Club building.

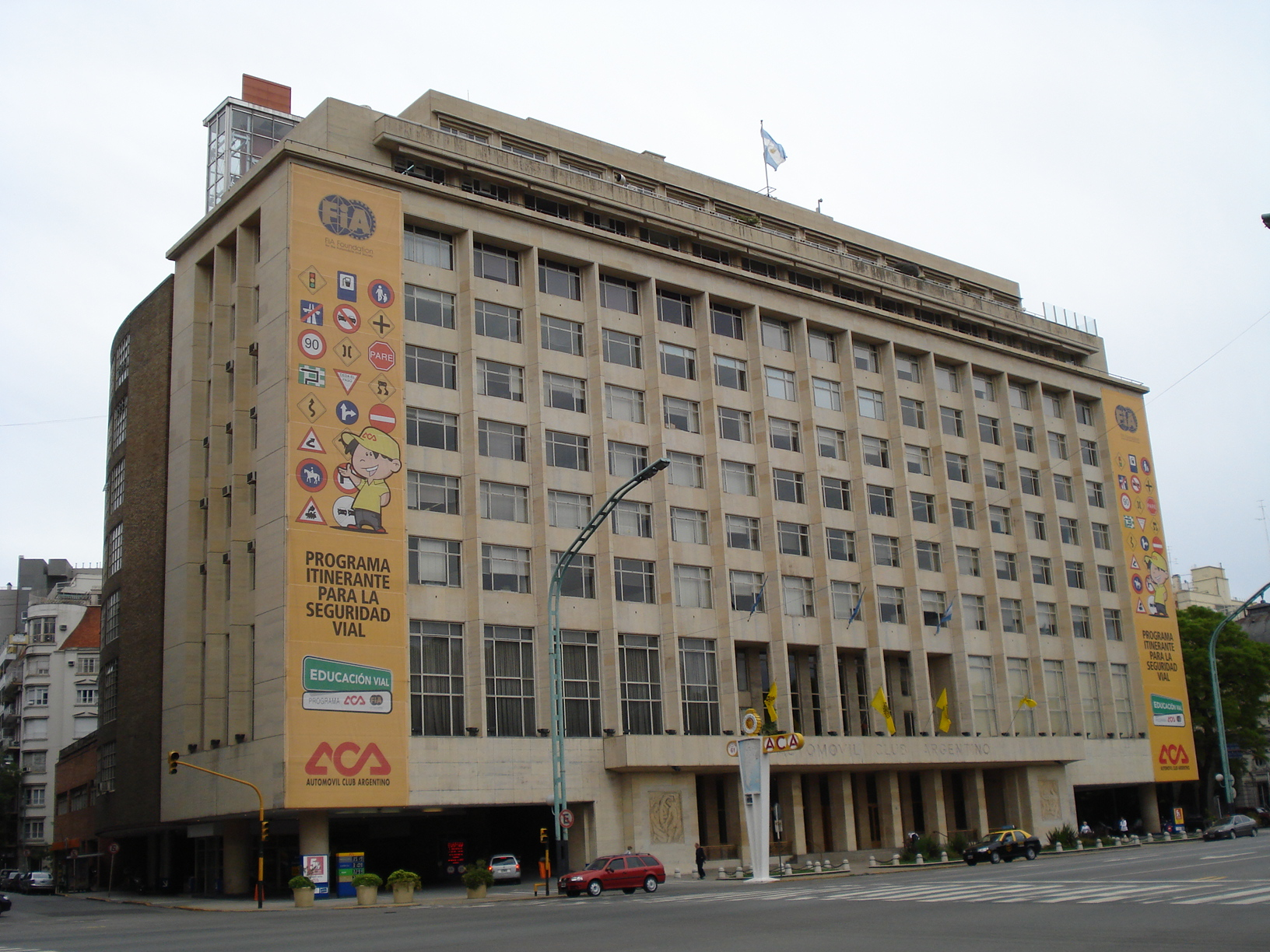

The Argentine Automobile Club building its national headquarters of ACA located in Palermo neighborhood in Buenos Aires.

The building is designed in the Rationalist style by local architect Antonio U. Vilar and collaborators Alejandro Bustillo, was completed in 1942. on Buenos Aires' Avenida del Libertador.

The building and its automobile museum are Palermo neighborhood landmarks.

== Gallery ==
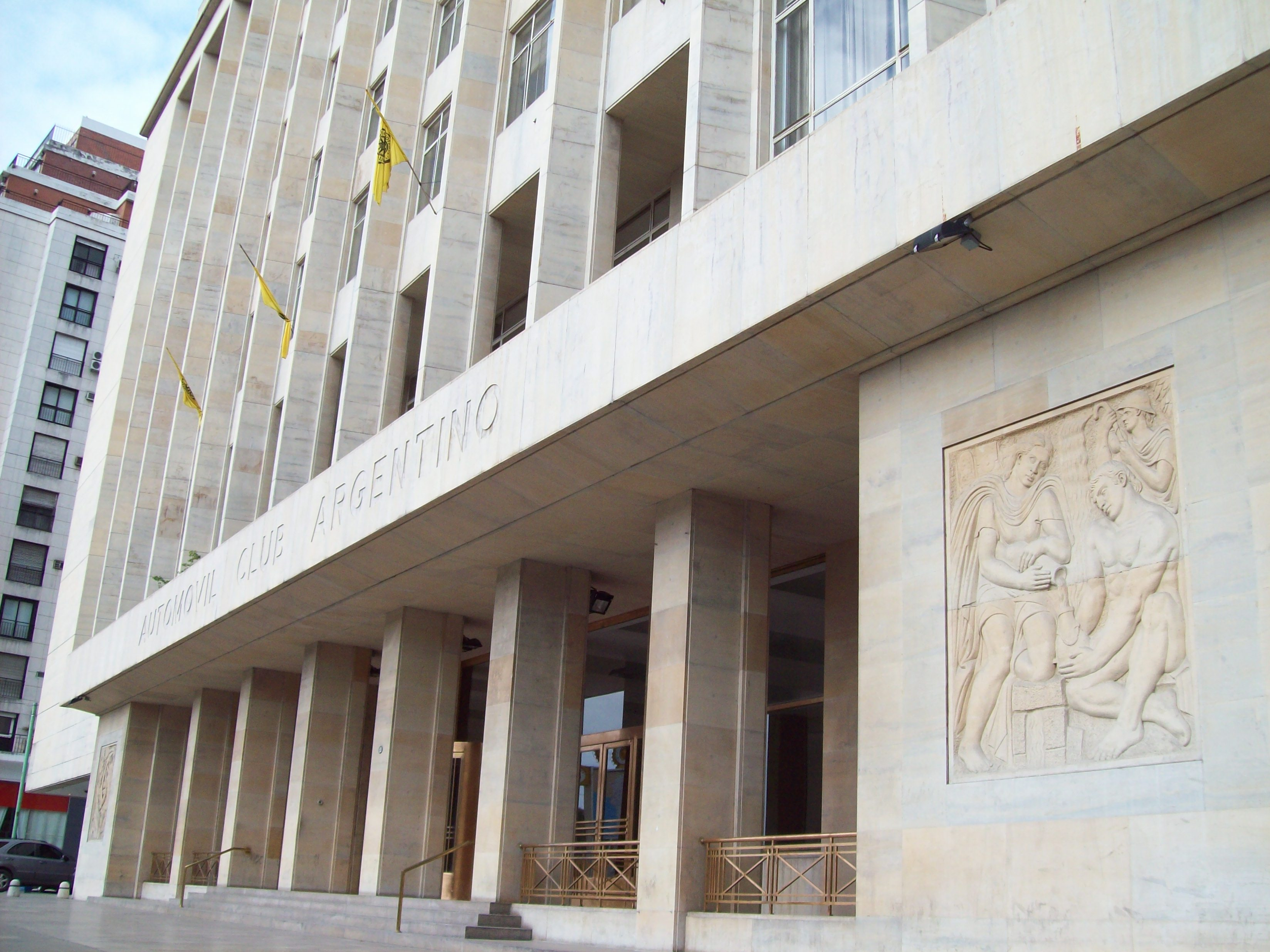
