= Juan Domínguez (boxer) =

Dominican Republic boxer (born 1986)

Juan Dominguez
Personal information
- Nickname: Baby Tito
- Nationality: Dominican
- Born: Juan Dominguez; February 9, 1986 (age 40) Santiago, Dominican Republic
- Weight: Super Bantamweight

Boxing career
- Stance: Orthodox

Boxing record
- Total fights: 19
- Wins: 18
- Win by KO: 12
- Losses: 1

Juan Dominguez (born February 9, 1986, Santiago de los Caballeros, Dominican Republic) is a Dominican professional boxer. His nicknames is 'Baby Tito' in reference to his boxing style being similar to that of Félix Trinidad. Dominguez was born in Santiago, Dominican Republic and now resides in Brooklyn, New York. In 2014, he signed with noted fight manager Al Haymon.

== Amateur ==
In 2004, Dominguez won the New York Metro Golden Gloves championship at 112 lbs, defeating Mervin Santana in the finals.

== Professional ==
Dominguez made his professional debut against Francisco Palacios on February 22, 2007. The fight took place at Roseland Ballroom in New York City, New York. Dominguez won the fight by four round unanimous decision.

In eight years as a professional, Dominguez has compiled a professional record of 18–0 with 12 knockouts and has gone eight rounds three times, but has yet to fight for a world title in the super bantamweight professional boxing class, or fight for a full ten rounds or more. Dominguez is scheduled to fight the eight round main event on a scheduled 10 boxing card in the newly built Celebrity Ballroom at The Claridge Hotel (Atlantic City), New Jersey, on Friday, May 22, 2015, co-promoted by King's Promotions and Dee Lee Promotions, the first at the recently reopened renovated Claridge Hotel.

On December 8, 2015, Juan Dominguez's undefeated record came to a crashing halt after Yenifel Vincente delivered a devastating overhand right to Dominguez's left temple, just 20 seconds into Round 3, knocking Dominguez out cold. The bout took place at the Sun Bank Center in Trenton, New Jersey.
