= Juan Dominguez Palermo =

Sicilian military officer and politician

Capitán Juan Dominguez de Palermo

Mayordomo of the Cabildo de Buenos Aires
- In office 1605–1606
- Monarch: Philip III
- Preceded by: ?
- Succeeded by: ?

Regidor of the Cabildo de Buenos Aires
- In office 1605–1606
- Monarch: Philip III

Personal details
- Born: Giovanni Domenico di Vargas c. 1560 Palermo, Kingdom of Sicily
- Died: June 9, 1635 Buenos Aires, Viceroyalty of Peru
- Spouse(s): Isabel Gómez de Saravia; María Rodríguez
- Occupation: army politician merchant landowner
- Profession: military man
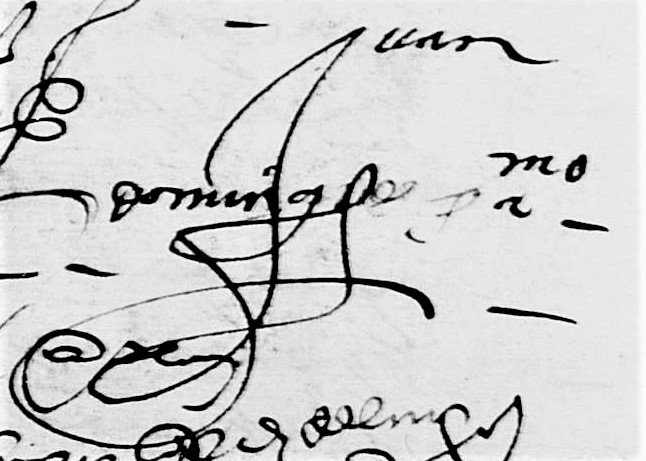
- Signature

Military service
- Allegiance: Spanish Empire
- Branch/service: Spanish Army
- Years of service: 1580-1635
- Rank: Captain
- Unit: Fuerte de Buenos Aires
- Battles/wars: Ottoman–Venetian War

Juan Dominguez de Palermo (c. 1560 – 1635) was a Sicilian military officer and politician, who served in Buenos Aires during the Viceroyalty of Peru. His name is attached to one of the most exclusive neighborhoods in Buenos Aires, Palermo.

He was born in Sicily, the son of Domingo de Giovani and Maria de Vargas, belonging to a distinguished family. He served under the command of John of Austria, providing services in Malta, Naples and Spain. Established in the Río de la Plata by 1590, he received land grants in Buenos Aires, being the owner of several haciendas in the suburbs of the city. He was an active member of the City Council, serving as regidor for several years. He also held the honorary position of Mayordomo of Buenos Aires, a position concerning of the control of the economic activities of the city.

He was married twice, first to Isabel Gómez de Saravia, daughter of Miguel Gómez de la Puerta and Beatriz Luiz de Figueroa, belonging to families of Spanish and Portuguese conquerors, and second with María Rodríguez, a Creole descendant of the Captain Antón Higueras de Santana. His daughter Juana Gómez de Saravia, was married to Francisco de Melo Coutinho, son of João de Melo Coutinho and Juana Holguín, belonging to families of Vasco Fernandes Coutinho and Pedro Álvarez Holguín.
