= Cerviño =

Cerviño is a surname of Galician origin in northwestern Spain. Cerviño means "little deer" in Galician, the native language of the region; cervo means "deer" and the -iño ending is a diminutive suffix.

== Notable people ==
- Alberto Casado Cerviño (born 1952), Spanish jurist and civil servant
- Caridad González Cerviño, Spanish politician
- José Cerviño Cerviño (1920–2012), Spanish prelate of the Roman Catholic Church
- José Cerviño García (1843–1922), Spanish sculptor and stonemason
- Pedro Cerviño (1757–1816), Spanish-Argentine military engineer, surveyor, cartographer, publisher, and teacher
