= Avenida Sarmiento =

Avenue in Buenos Aires, Argentina

Coordinates: 34.5769°S 58.4167°W

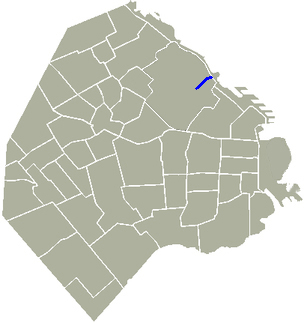
Location of Sarmiento Avenue in Buenos Aires.

Avenida General Sarmiento is an avenue located in the Palermo neighborhood, in Buenos Aires, Argentina. It runs from Plaza Italia to the Costanera Rafael Obligado Avenue, across the Parque Tres de Febrero.

== History ==
When Governor Juan Manuel de Rosas installed its fifth resting on the grounds of the present Parque Tres de Febrero built the main house (Big House of Roses) in what today would be the intersection of Sarmiento Avenue and Libertador, and a building named "La Maestranza" in the west corner. The Avenue was a main road in fifth, with ombúes on both sides. After the defeat of Rosas in Caseros the Big House was used for several years as a military college and then as Naval School, and finally demolished on February 3, 1899. The following year, on 25 May, the monument inaugurated in place to Sarmiento, designed by Auguste Rodin. Moreover, La Maestranza building was demolished in 1924 and the site was a monument to Rosas, work of Ricardo Dalla Lasta opened in 1999.

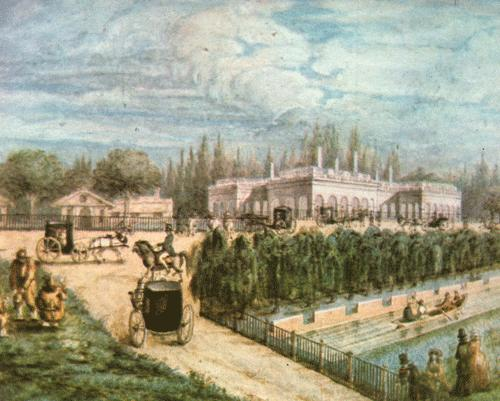
Rosas house in 1850.

For project and momentum of President Domingo Faustino Sarmiento (ruled 1868-1874) the area was improving, and in 1883, being Mayor Torcuato de Alvear, tropical palms were placed on both sides, according to the desire and impulse Sarmiento a decade ago and was called Avenida de las Palmeras. But these palms were not adapted to the climate and terrain and began to deteriorate, and to be turned into a kind of column with a tuft of withered leaves on top, popular with the nicknamed "the brooms and dusters Sarmiento" and the "Avenue of the Brooms". Eventually they were replaced by bananas, which still stand today.

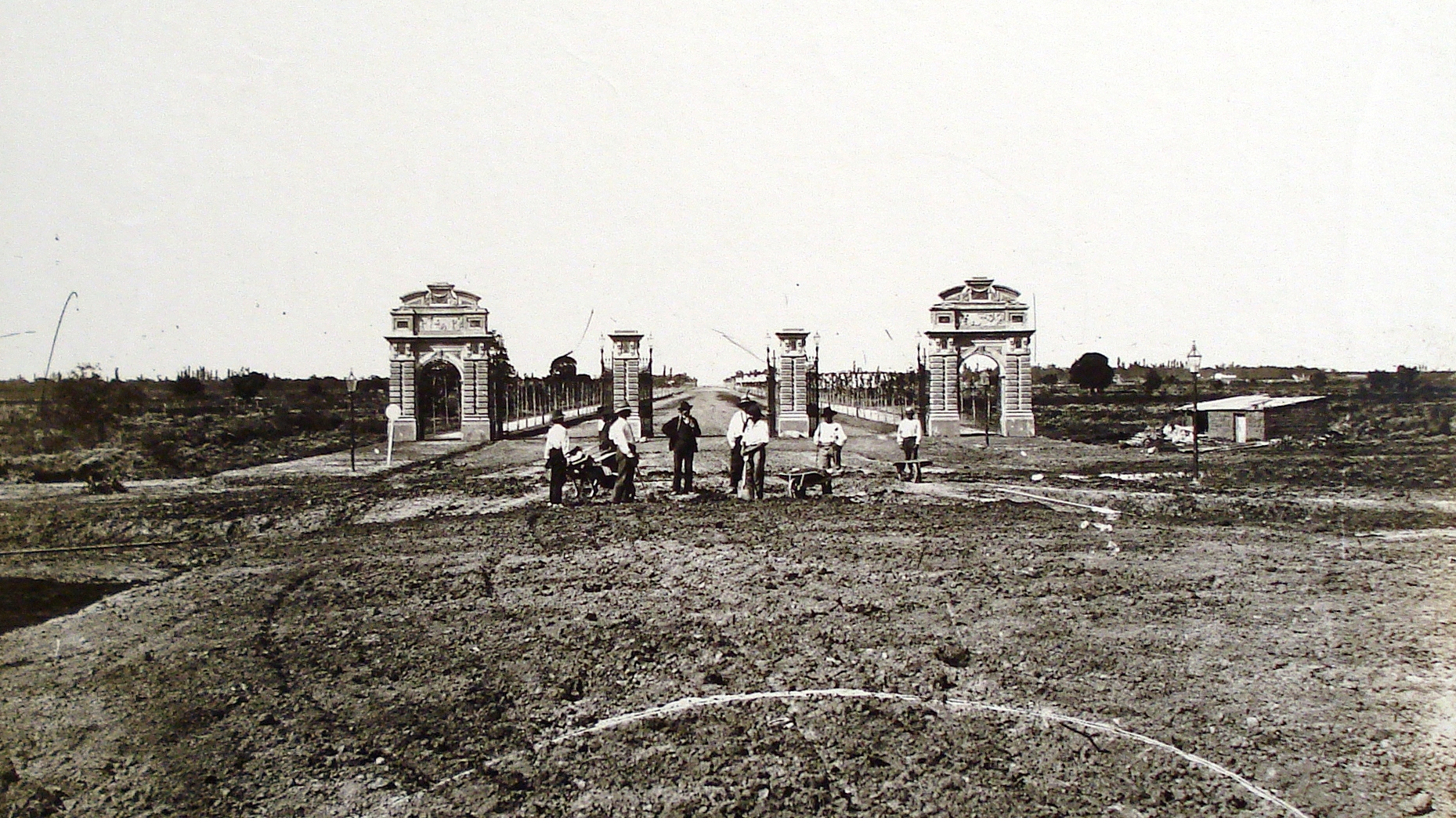
Palermo gates in 1875.

In a plane Pedro Uzal, 1879 the track was already included with the name of Domingo Faustino Sarmiento. It had a porch in his initiation (at Santa Fe Avenue) known as the Gates of Palermo. These gave an elegant air and stretched from the entrance to the Zoo to the entrance of La Rural. They had three covers for the passage of carriages and two high arches on the sidewalks for pedestrians. Its gates railings had been forged in the smithy famous Zamboni Silvestre (Rivadavia and Talcahuano). Overnight closed to the passage of carts, to which in the early years were charged tolls ($5) as the riders ($3) by a law of 1878. But a few years will not be overcharged.

Between 1877 and 1912, compared to the solar where now stands the Galileo Galilei planetarium, Café Hansen worked with entrance by the avenue, which many consider one of the cradles of tango. In 1917 the gates were demolished.

== Itinerary ==
The avenue begins in Plaza Italia, facing the Zoo and exhibition center of La Rural. It continues along the zoo and Francisco Seeber square, until the intersection with the Libertador Avenue, is at this junction the Monument to the Carta Magna and Four Regions of Argentina. in front of this is the monument to Domingo Faustino Sarmiento branch made by the famous French escurltor, Auguste Rodin. 300 meters later, at the intersection with Figueroa Alcorta Avenue is the located the monument to Justo Jose de Urquiza. Across the avenue on the left side is located the Galileo Galilei planetarium, and on the right the Egypt square.

Last ride of the avenue, passing under the railways bridges of San Martin and Mitre lines, and crossing a tunnel on the north branch of the Belgrano, is the end of the avenue, in a roundabout crossing the avenue Rafael Obligado where is located the monument to Jean Mermoz, on the north side of the Jorge Newbery Airport and across Fishing Club.

== Gallery ==
Images of some landmarks along this avenue.

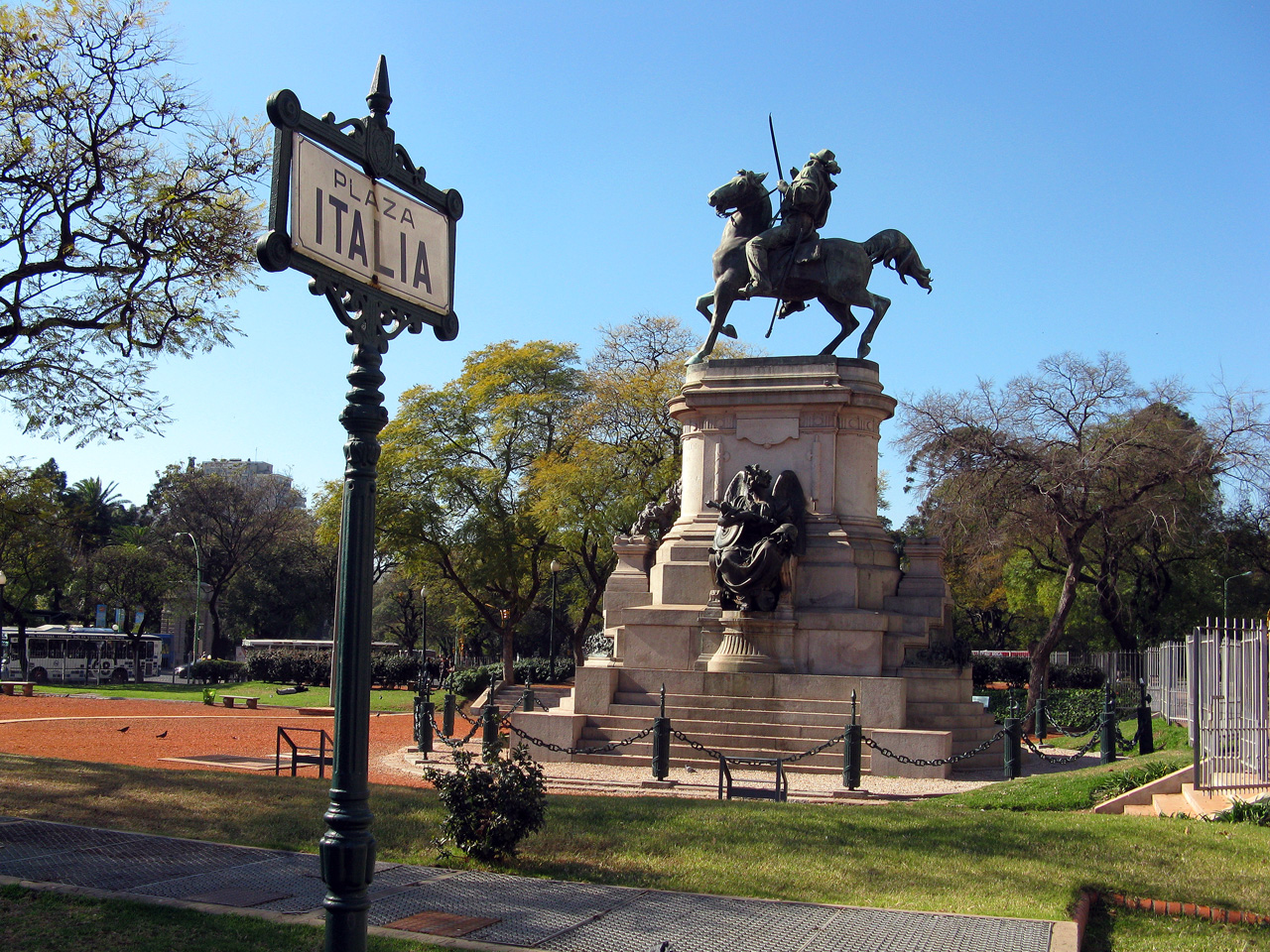
Plaza Italia and Giuseppe Garibaldi Monument.

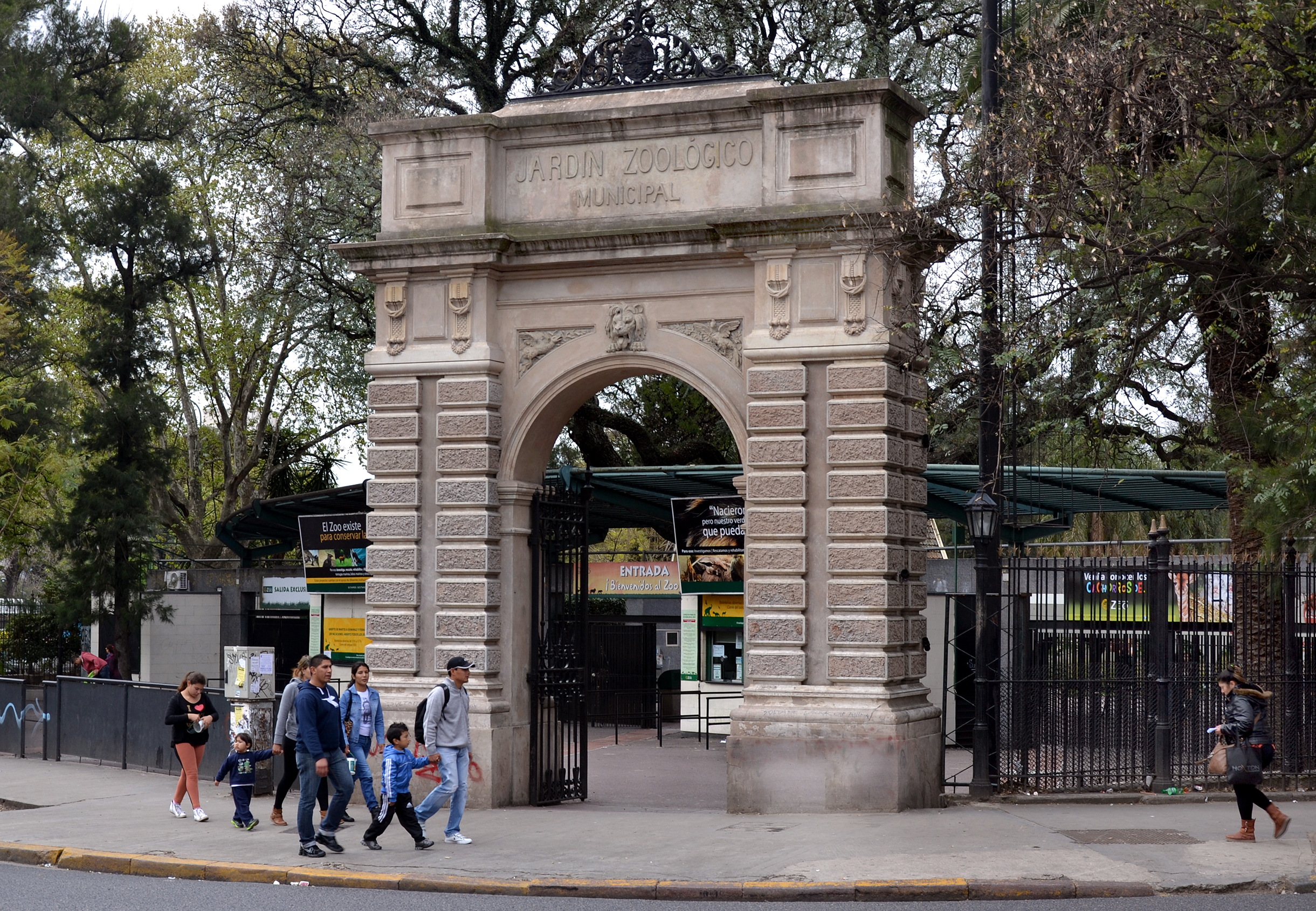
Buenos Aires Zoo

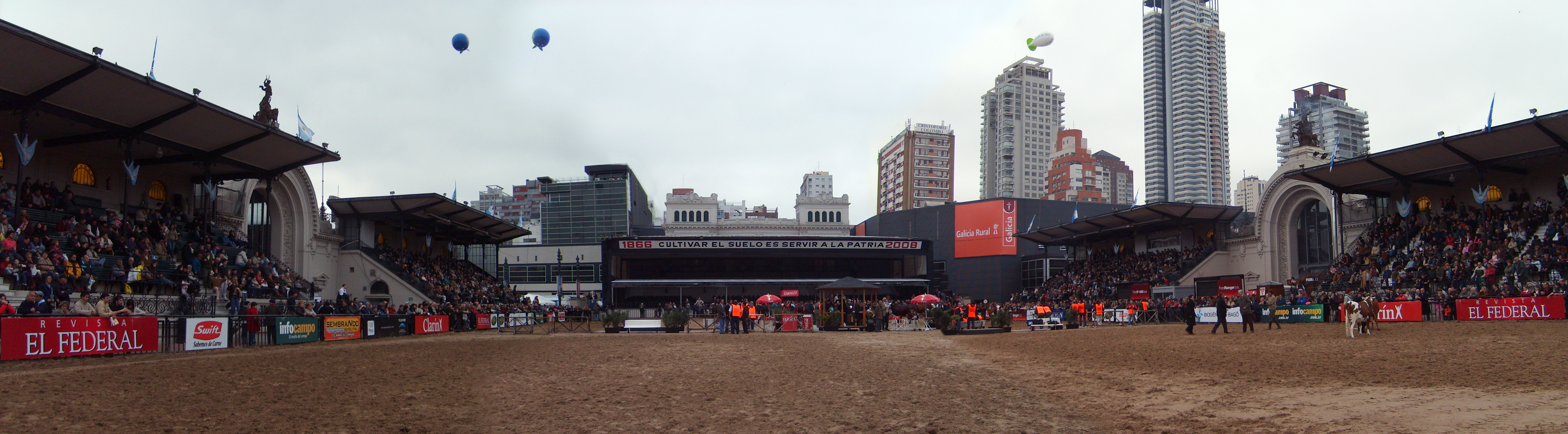
La Rural Exhibition Center

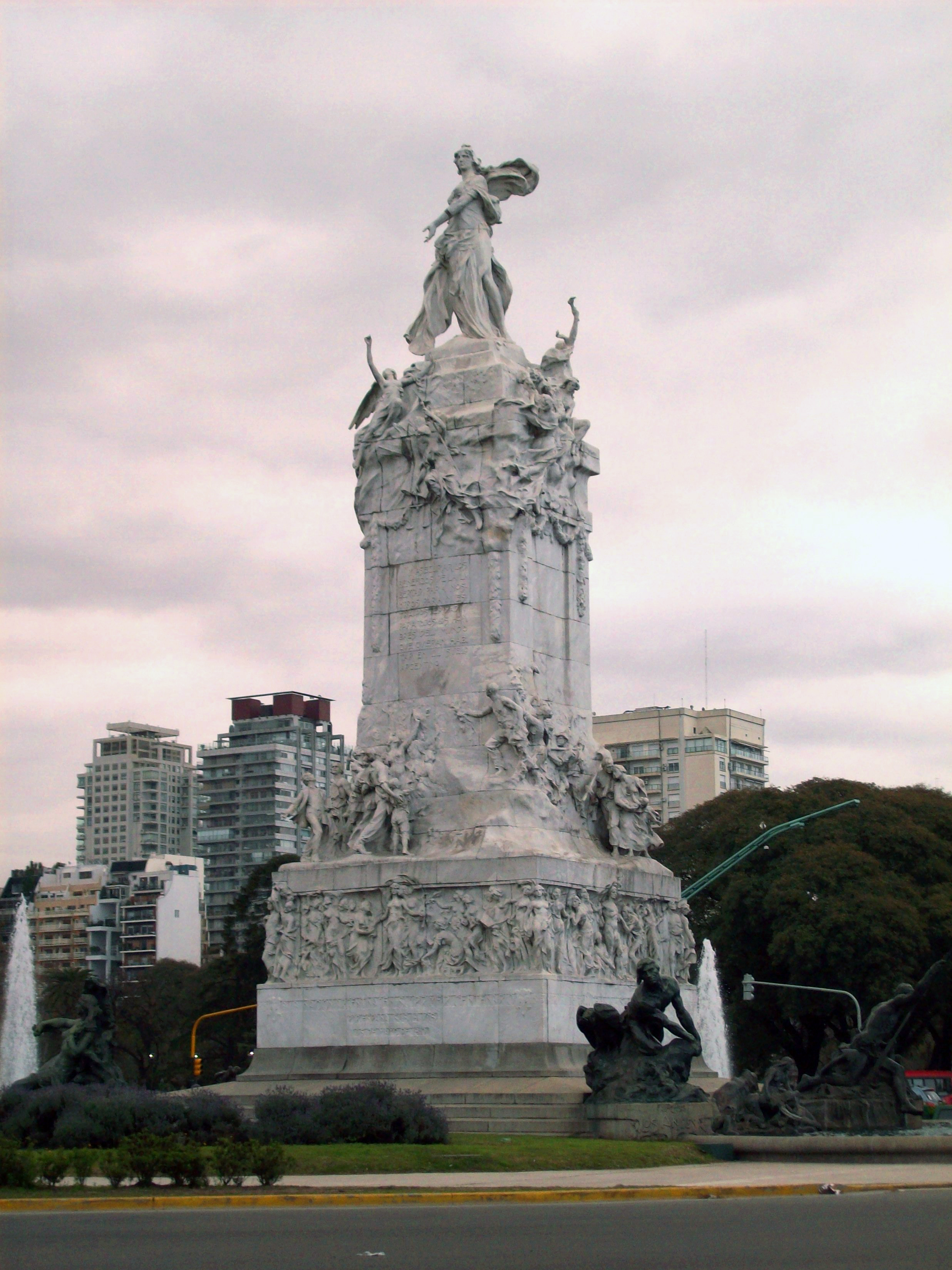
Monument to the Carta Magna and Four Regions of Argentina

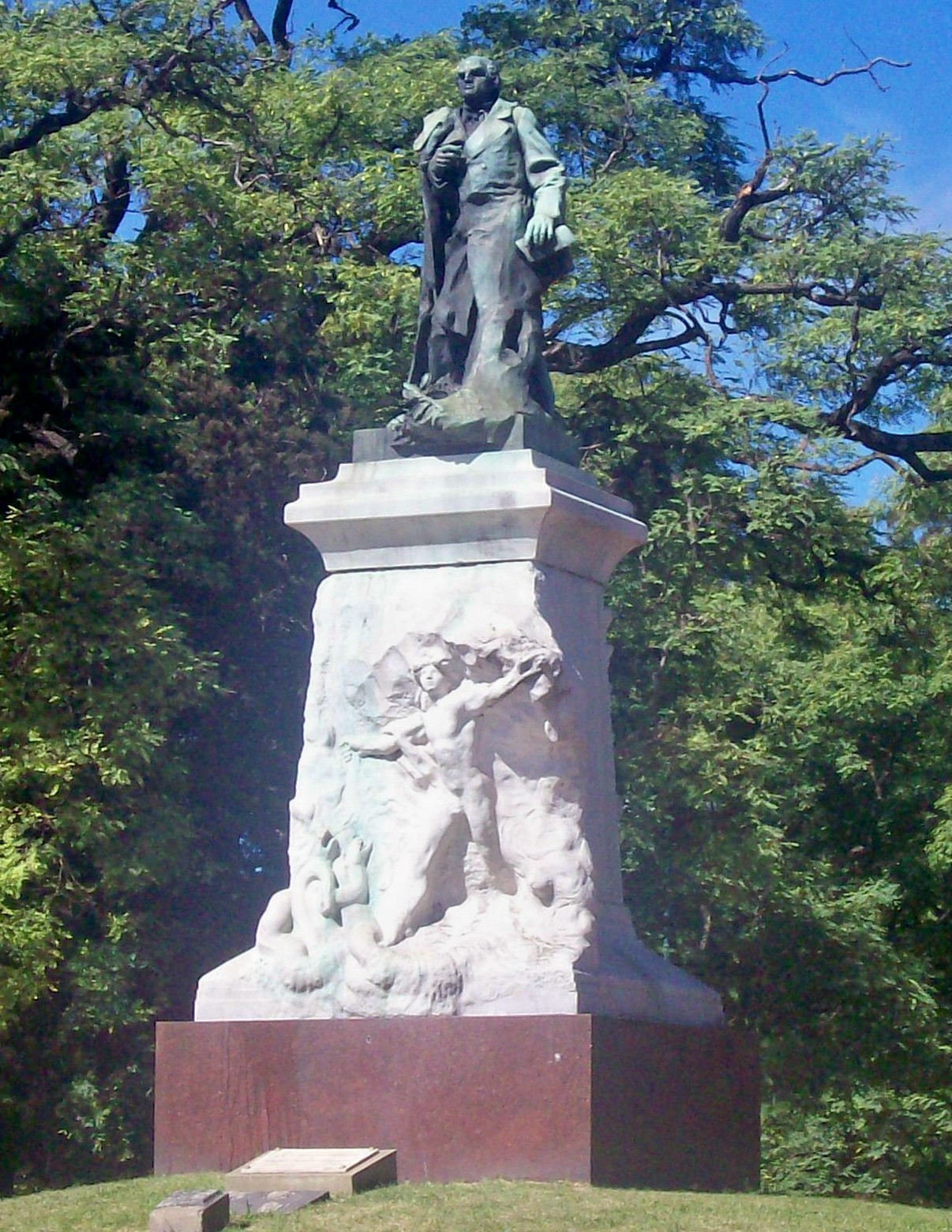
Domingo Sarmiento monument

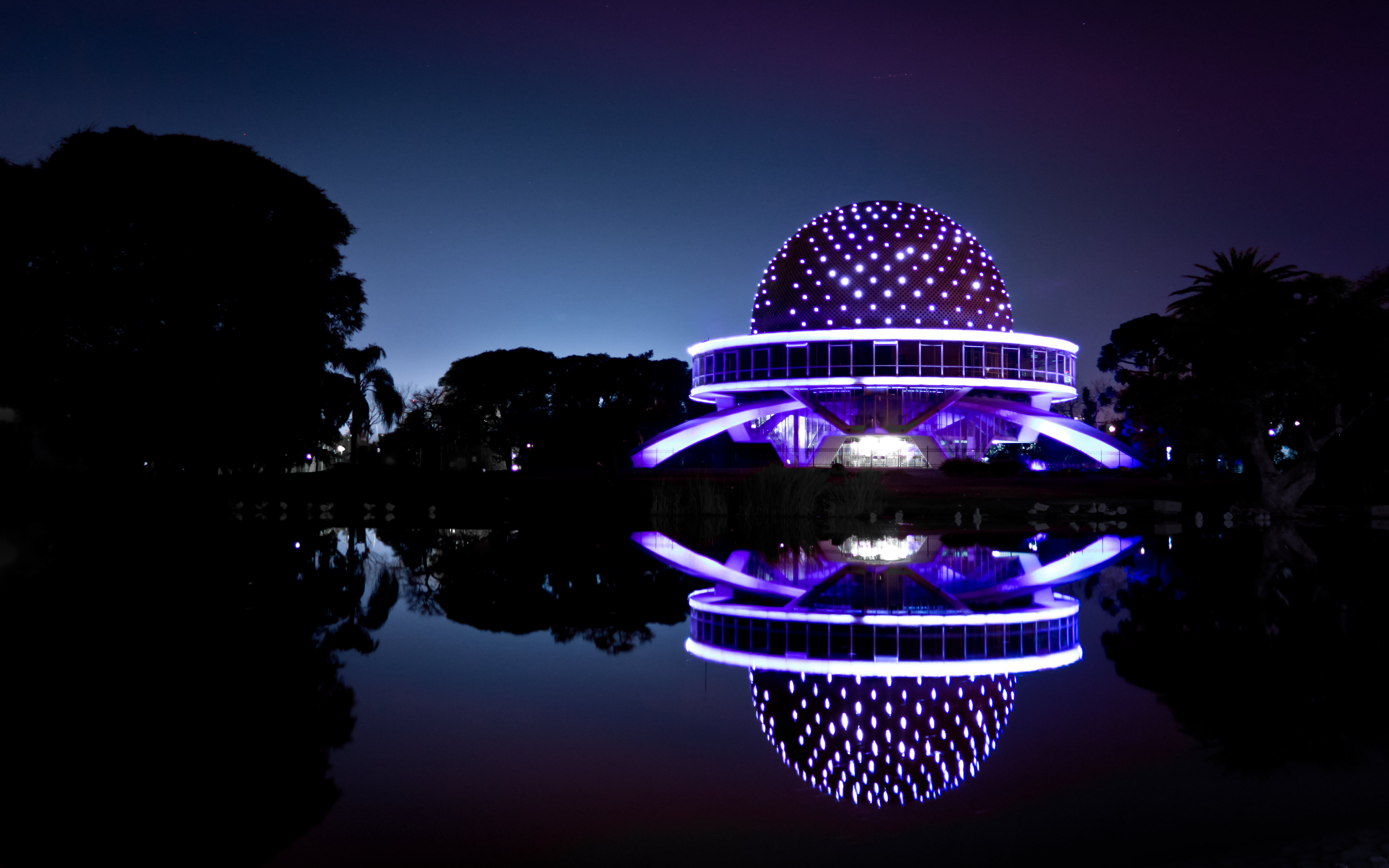
Galileo Galilei planetarium

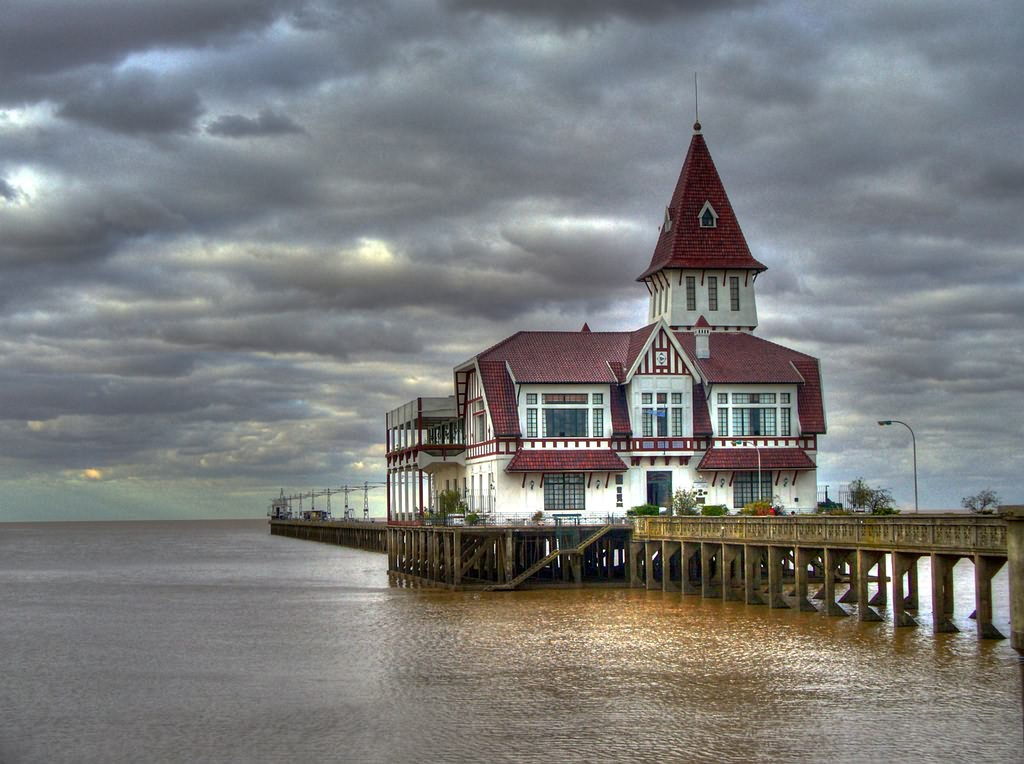
Fishing Club
