= Parque Tres de Febrero =

Urban park in Buenos Aires, Argentina

Coordinates: 34°34′24″S 58°24′53″W

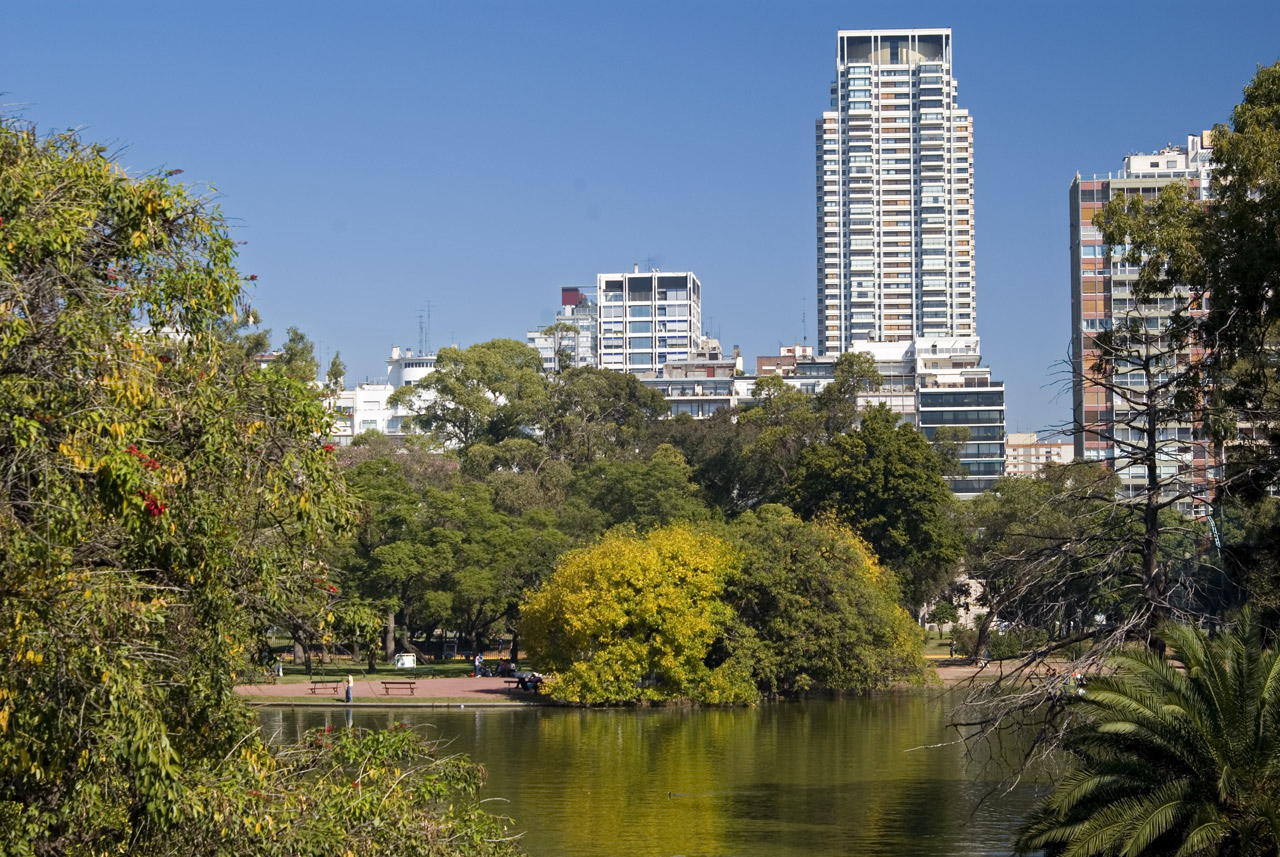
View of the park's Rose Garden Lake.

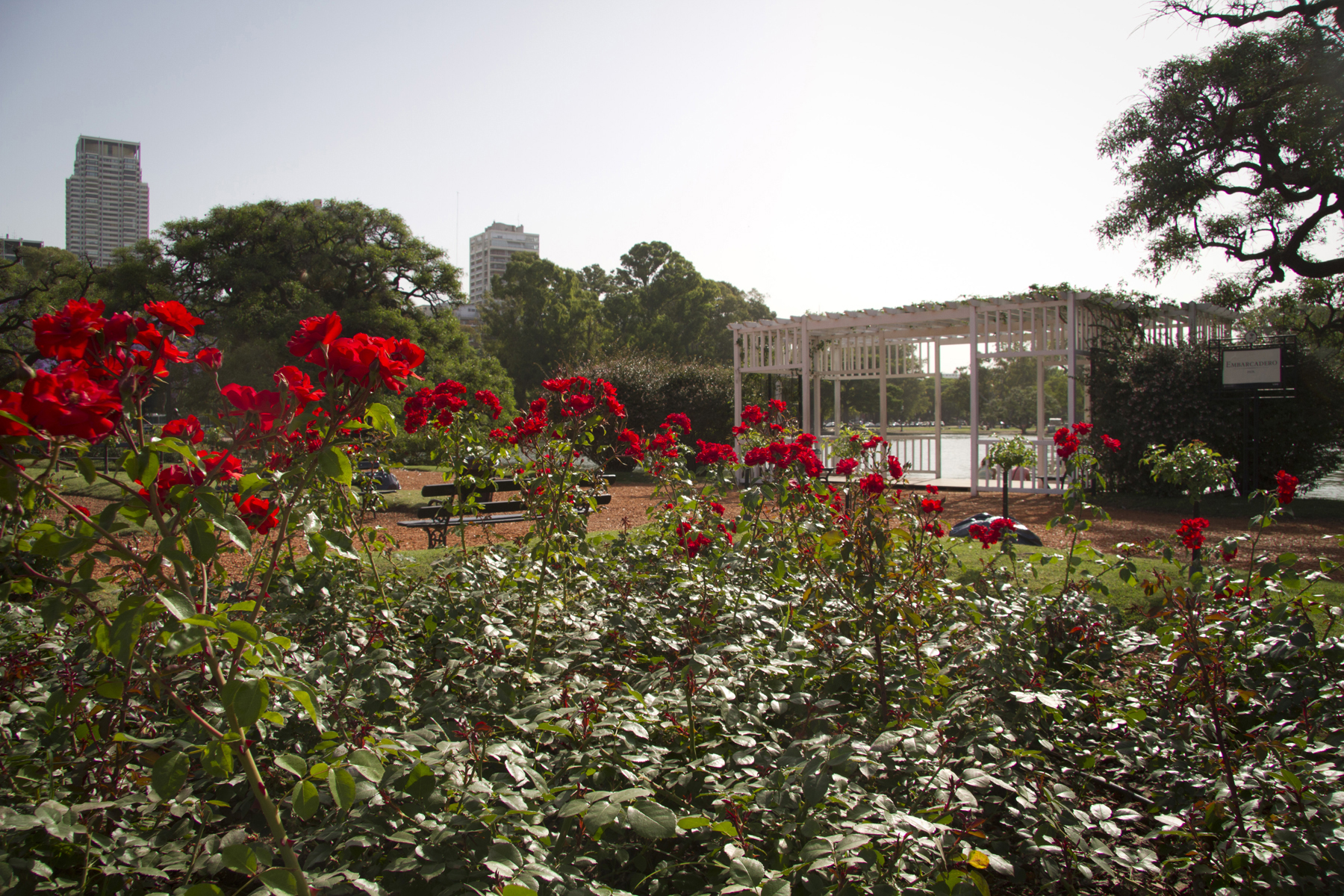
The rose garden.

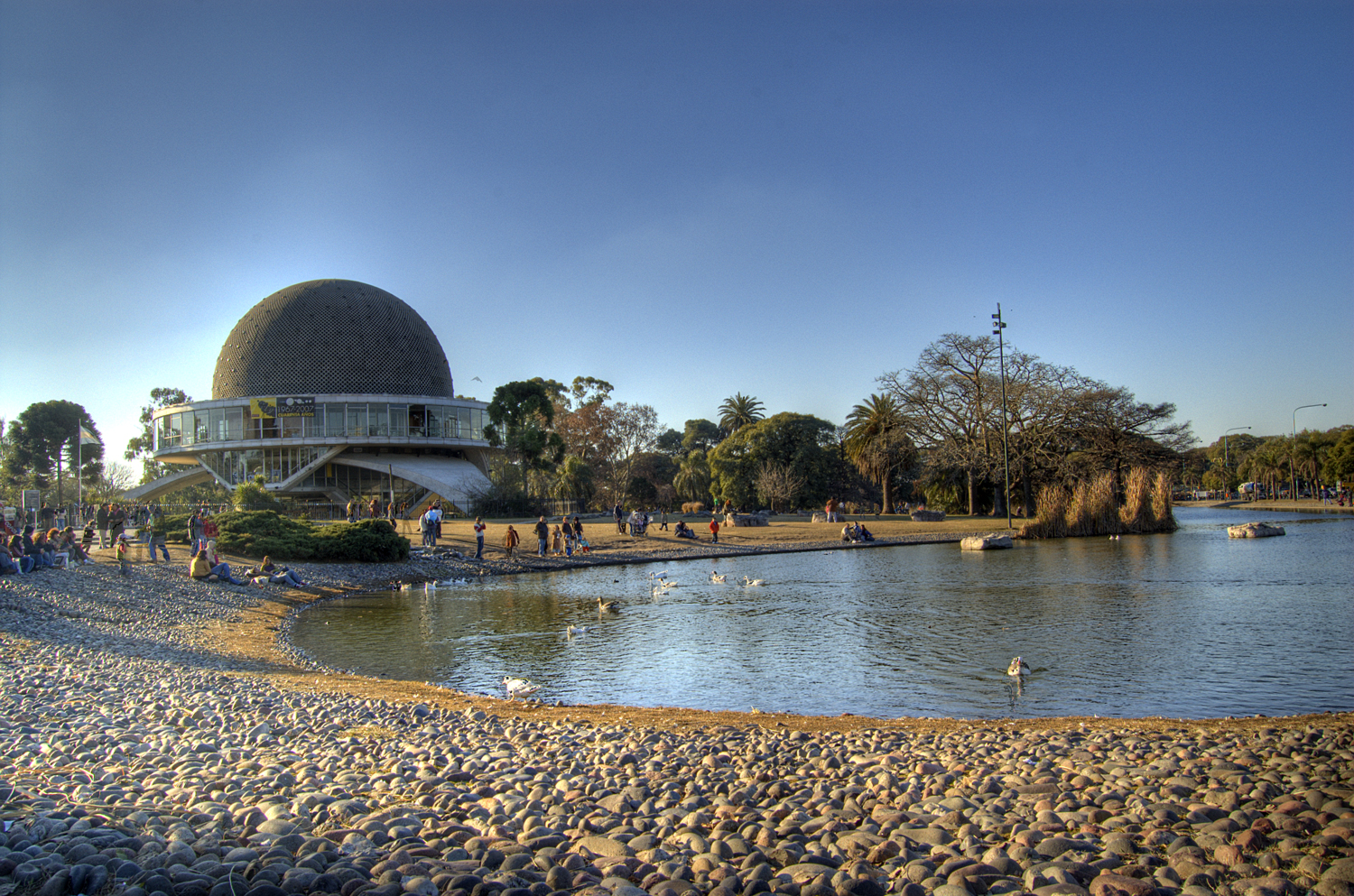
The City Planetarium.

Parque Tres de Febrero, popularly known as Bosques de Palermo (Palermo Woods), is an urban park of approximately 400 hectares (about 989 acres) located in the neighborhood of Palermo in Buenos Aires, Argentina. Located between Libertador and Figueroa Alcorta Avenues, it is known for its groves, lakes, and rose gardens (El Rosedal).

== History ==
Following the 1852 overthrow of strongman Juan Manuel de Rosas, his extensive northside Buenos Aires properties became public lands and, in 1862, a municipal ordinance provided for a city park on most of that land. On the initiative of Congressman Vicente Fidel López and President Domingo Sarmiento, work began in 1874 on Parque Tres de Febrero (February 3 Park), named in honor of February 3, 1852, the date of the defeat of Governor Rosas, among whose opponents had been Sarmiento.

Designed by urbanist Jordán Czeslaw Wysocki and architect Julio Dormal, the park was inaugurated on November 11, 1875. The dramatic economic growth of Buenos Aires afterwards helped to lead to its transfer to the municipal domain in 1888, whereby French Argentine urbanist Carlos Thays was commissioned to expand and further beautify the park, between 1892 and 1912. Thays designed the Zoological Gardens, the Botanical Gardens, the adjoining Plaza Italia and the Rose Garden.

The Andalusian Patio and Monument to the Four Argentine Regions (the "Spaniards' Monument") were added in 1927, the Municipal Velodrome in 1951 and the Galileo Galilei planetarium, in 1966. Its Modernist architecture is distinctive in the city—a sphere supported by three arches. A popular field trip destination for the city's schoolchildren, the planets and other astronomical phenomena are projected on the dome, inside.

A temporary circuit inside the park was used as the track for the Buenos Aires Grand Prix of Formula Libre between 1948 and 1950.

An Edwardian-style former café on the grounds became the Eduardo Sívori Museum in 1996.

Many people use the park every day, both on foot and bicycle, and this number increases greatly at the weekends. Boat rides are available on the three artificial lakes within the park. Close to the boating lake is the Poets' Garden, with stone and bronze busts of renowned poets, including Jorge Luis Borges, Luigi Pirandello and William Shakespeare.

== Gardens and Parks ==
=== Buenos Aires Zoo ===
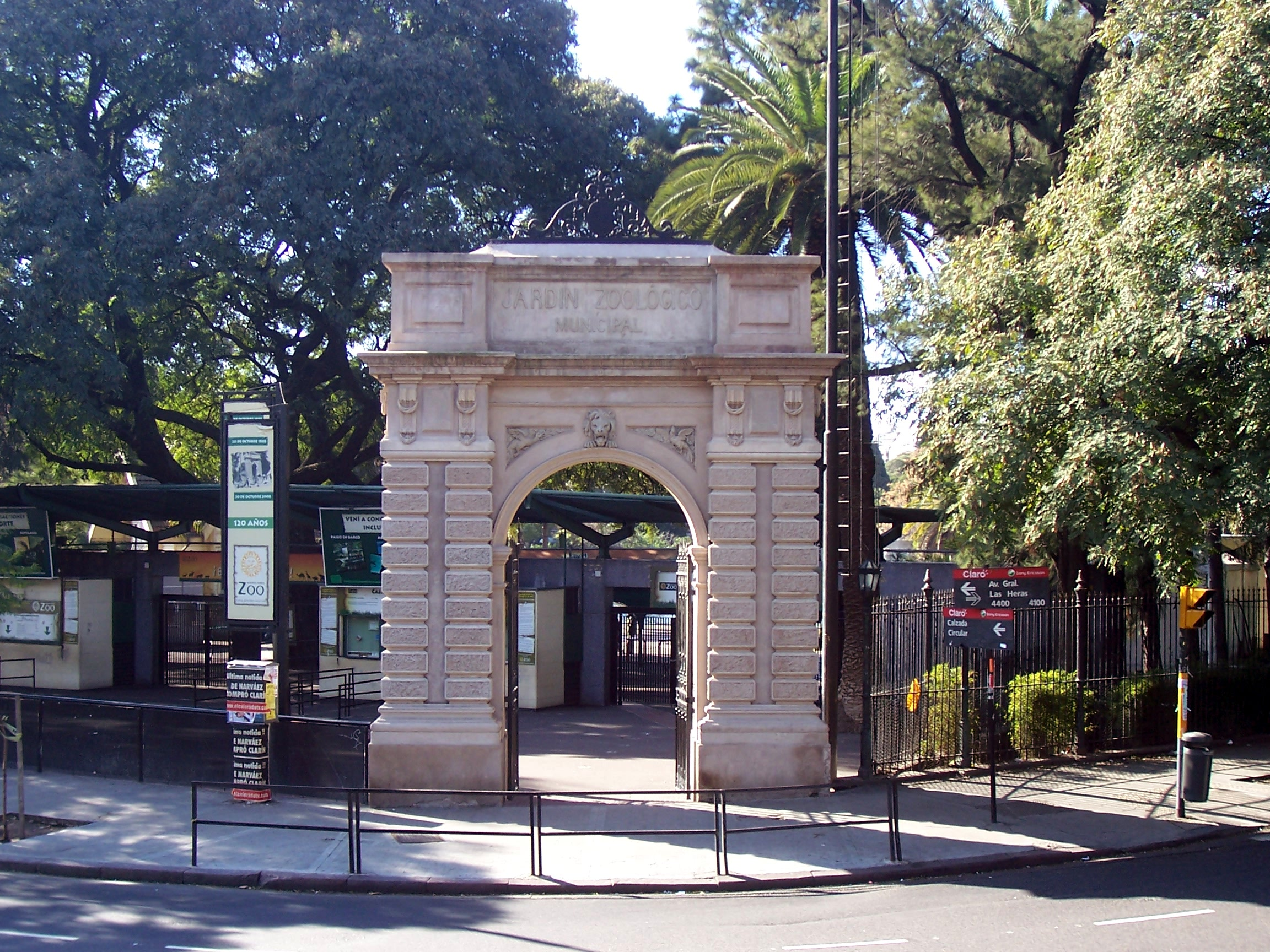
Zoo entrance.

The Buenos Aires Zoo was a 45-acre (18-ha) zoo founded in 1888 by the Mayor Antonio Crespo. The Zoo contained 89 species of mammals, 49 species of reptiles and 175 species of birds, with a total of over 2,500 different animals. The institution's goals were to conserve species, produce research, and to educate the public.

It is located opposite Plaza Italia at the junction of the Las Heras and Sarmiento Avenue.

It was closed to the public in 2016.

=== Japanese garden ===
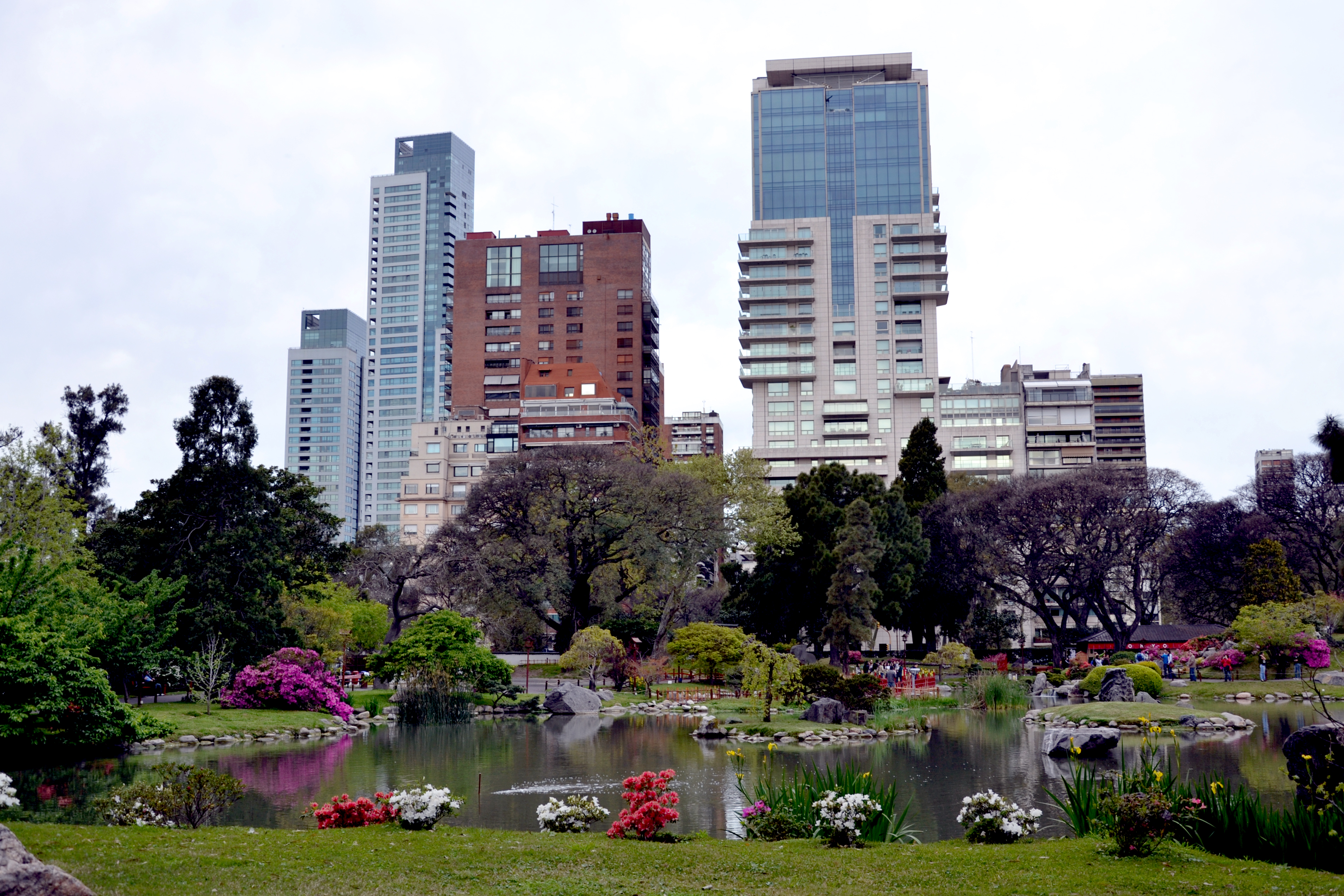

The Japanese garden was opened in 1967 at its current location, occupying a part of the Parque Tres de Febrero, in Plaza Sicilia. Is located in Adolfo Berro Avenue and front of the Alemania square.

The demolition of the original Japanese Garden in the Retiro area led to the 1967 opening of the current Buenos Aires Japanese Gardens, the World's largest outside Japan.

The gardens were inaugurated on occasion of a State visit to Argentina by then-Crown Prince Akihito and Princess Michiko of Japan.
