= Galileo Galilei Planetarium =

Planetarium in Buenos Aires (Argentina)

Galileo Galilei planetarium
- Planetario Galileo Galilei

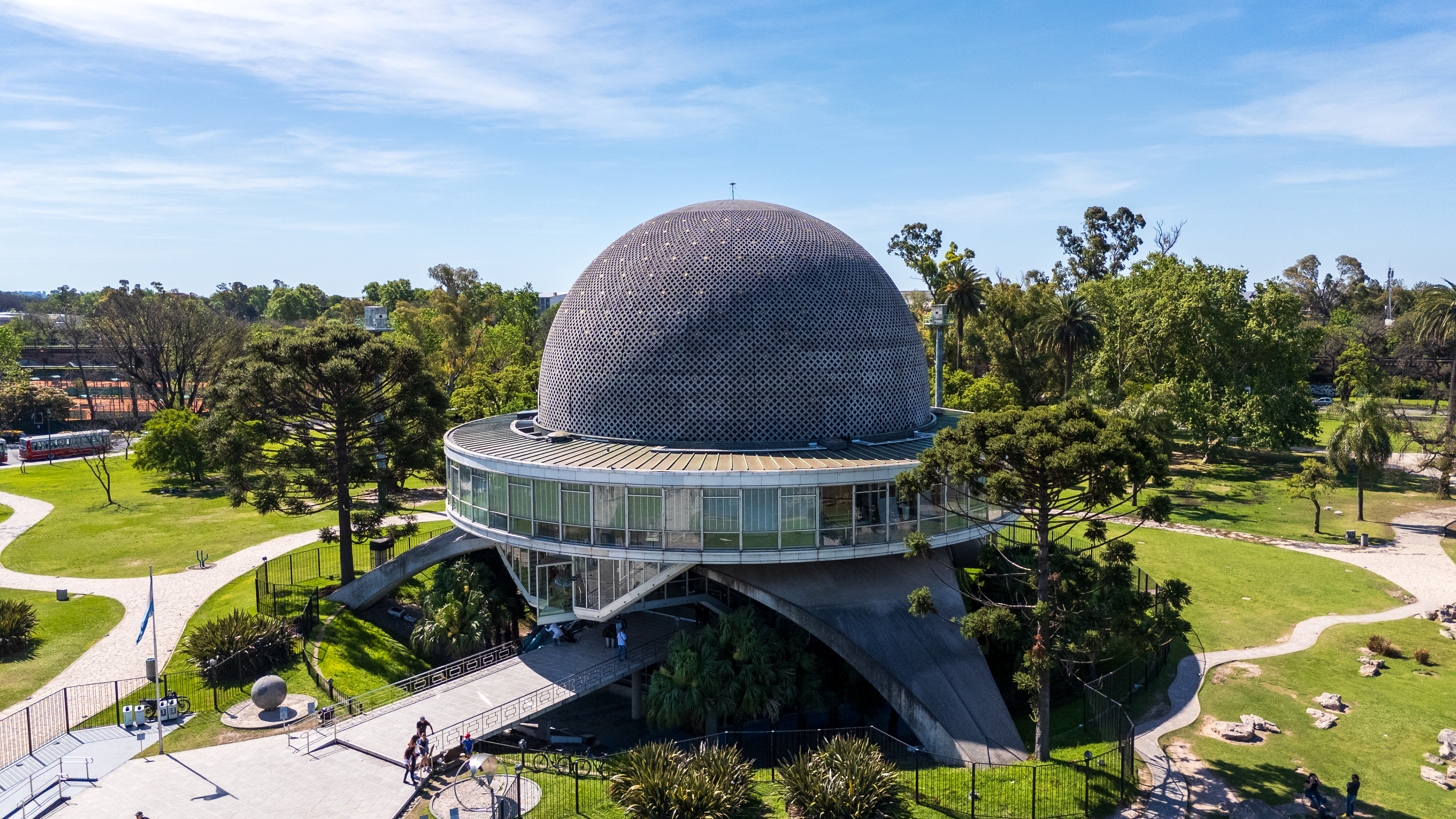

- Location within Buenos Aires
- Established: December 20, 1966
- Location: Palermo Woods, Palermo, Buenos Aires, Argentina
- Coordinates: 34°34′11″S 58°24′42″W
- Type: Planetarium
- Architect: Enrique Jan
- Website: Official Website

The Galileo Galilei planetarium, commonly known as Planetario, is located in Parque Tres de Febrero in the Palermo district of Buenos Aires, Argentina.

== History ==
The idea that Buenos Aires should have a planetarium began to take shape in 1958 by an agreement between Socialist Councilman José Luis Peña and the municipal Secretary of Culture, Dr. Aldo Cocca. Construction began under the direction of architect Enrique Jan in 1962, and it was inaugurated on December 20, 1966. The first function was carried out on June 13, 1967 for the students of "Escuela Comercial Nº 1" of Banfield and "Santa Unión de los Sagrados Corazones" of Capital Federal. Professor of geography and mathematics Antonio Cornejo showed them the sky over Buenos Aires, Argentine Antarctica and the South Pole, as well as demonstrating the orientation of the Southern Cross. The facility was officially opened to the public on April 5, 1968.

The planetarium was built in the same exact site from where the Buenos Aires Football Club and the Buenos Aires Cricket Club were evicted in the very late 1940s.

== Structure ==
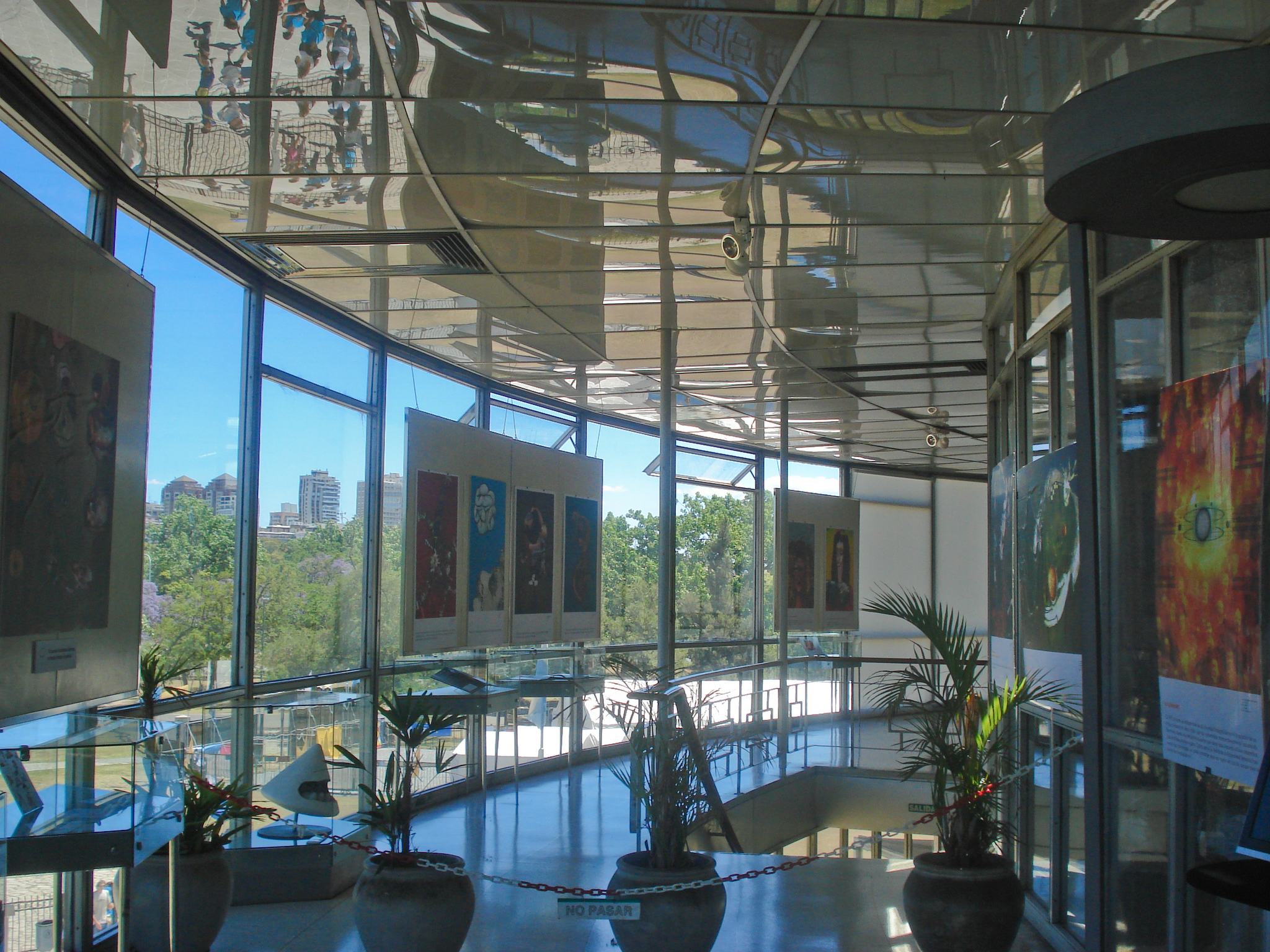
Hall inside the facility.

The building has five floors, six staircases and a 20 metres (66 ft) diameter room with 360 seats. The inside of the 20 m semispherical dome is covered with reflective aluminium.

The planetarium itself is located in the centre. The projection array once had over 100 projectors and was approximately 5 metres (16 ft) in height and 2.5 tons in weight, but now hosts only six Barco I600-4K10 projectors. It consists of a cylindrical framework with independent projectors for the Moon, the Sun and the visible planets (Mercury, Venus, Mars, Jupiter and Saturn) and two spheres in the extremes that project 8,900 stars, constellations and nebulas.

== Collections ==
- The museum has a piece of lunar rock which was brought back to Earth by the Apollo 11 mission and gifted to the planetarium by Richard Nixon.
- The museum is also home to a collection of 100-million-year-old sea life and amonite fossils from Neuquén Province.
- A metallic meteorite from Chaco Province is displayed on the entrance terrace.

== Gallery ==
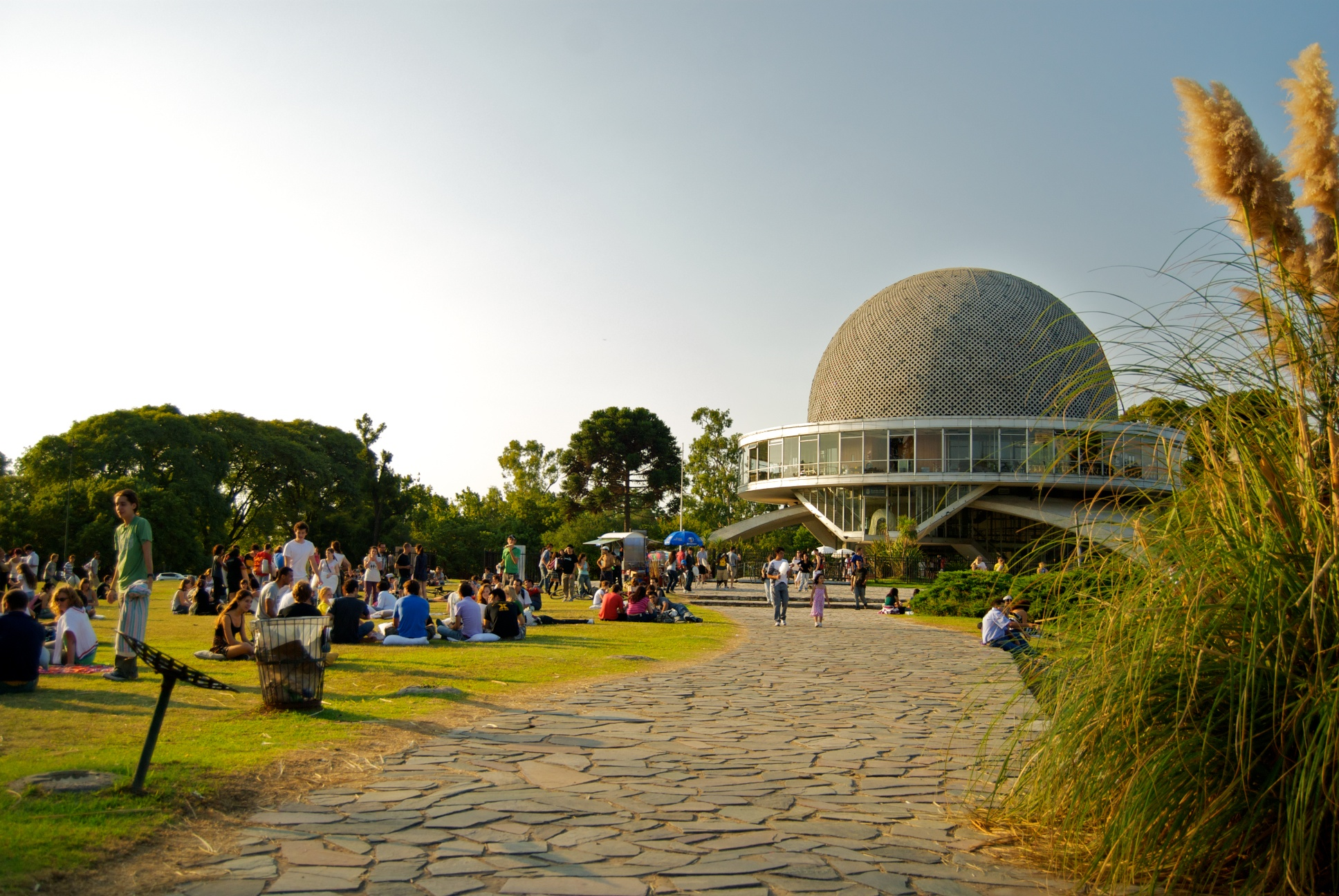
View of the Planetarium during the Buenos Aires Pillow Fight

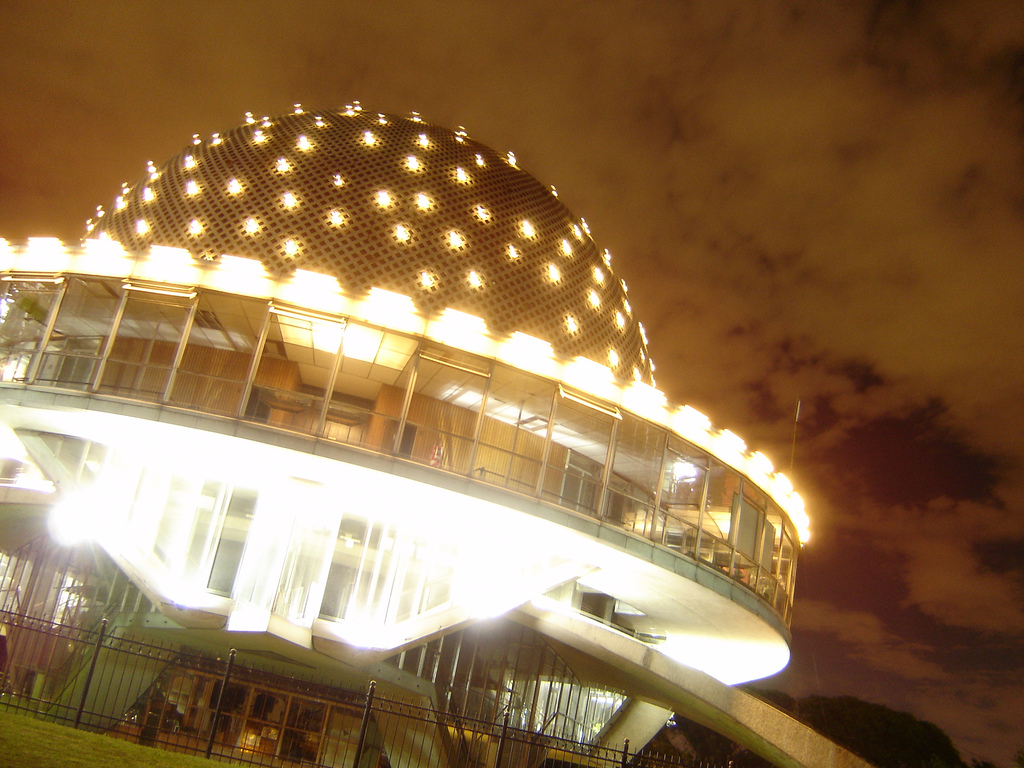
The Planetarium at dusk

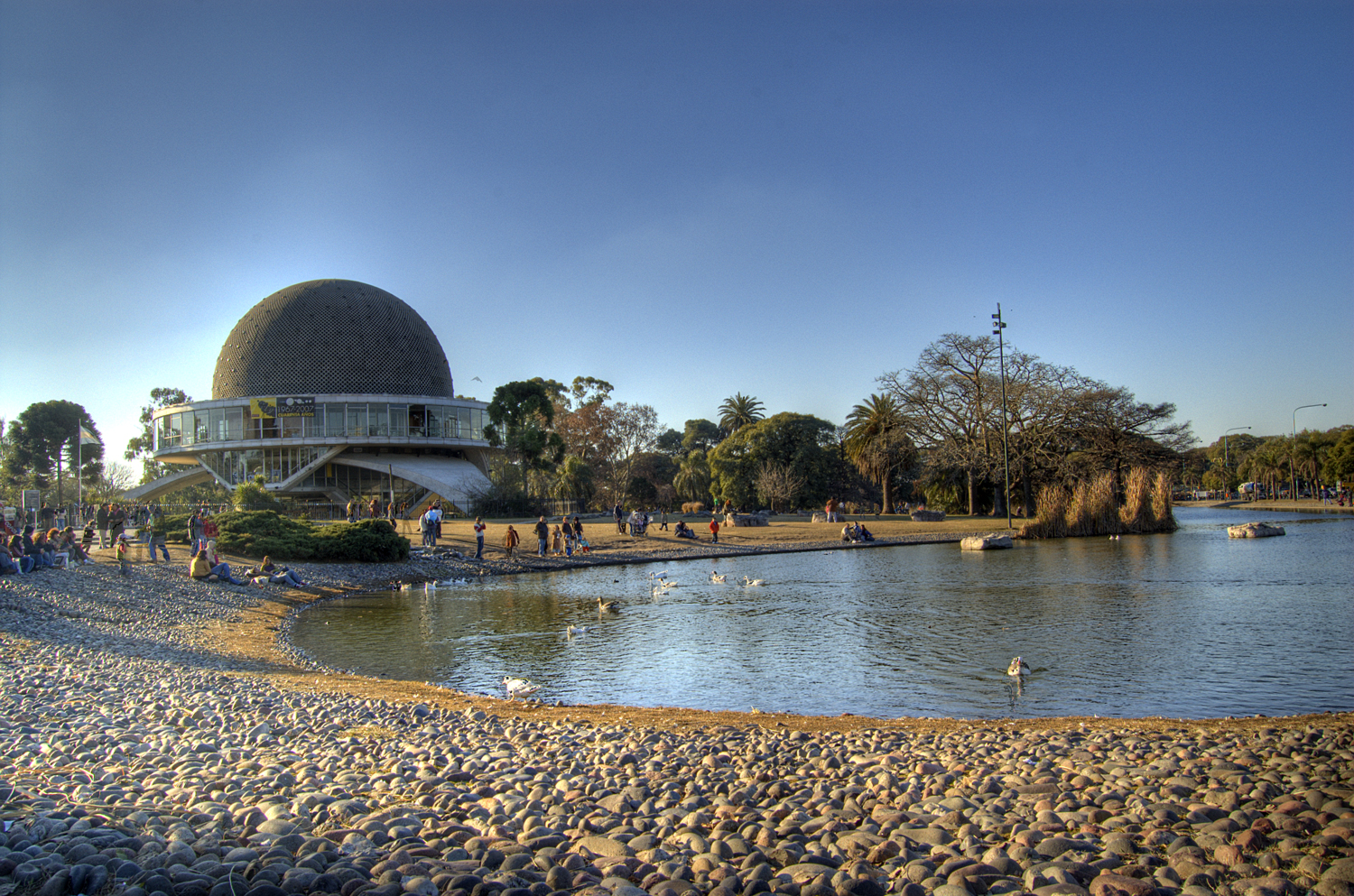
The Planetarium and the artificial lake in the foreground

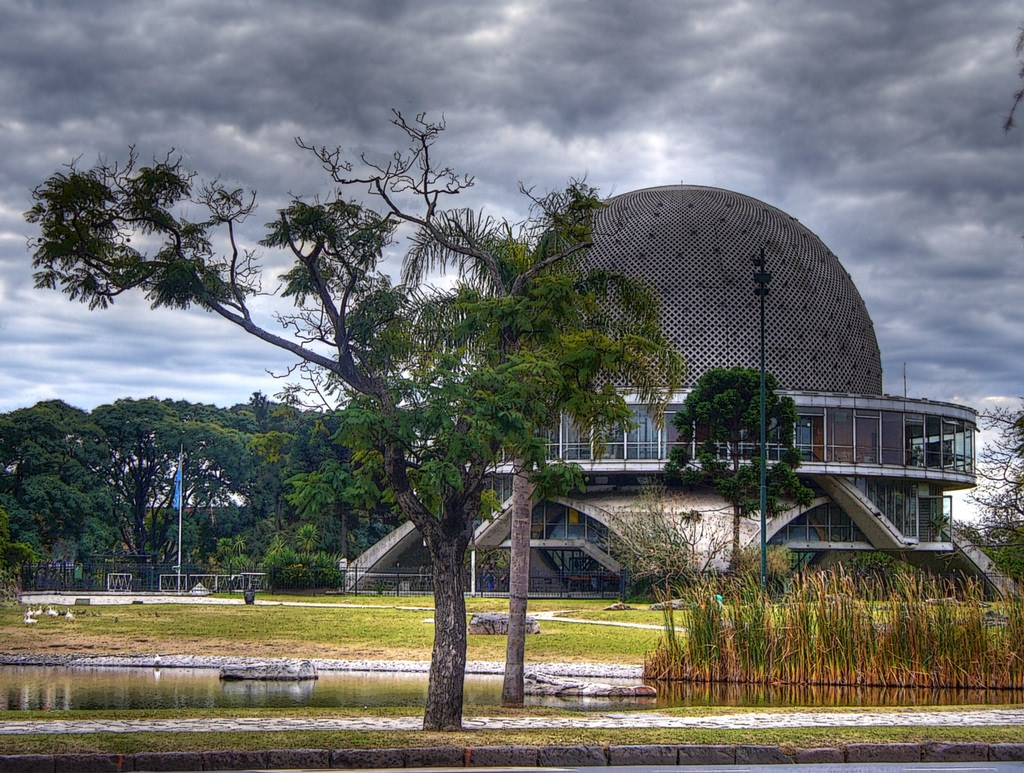
The Planetarium in a cloudy day

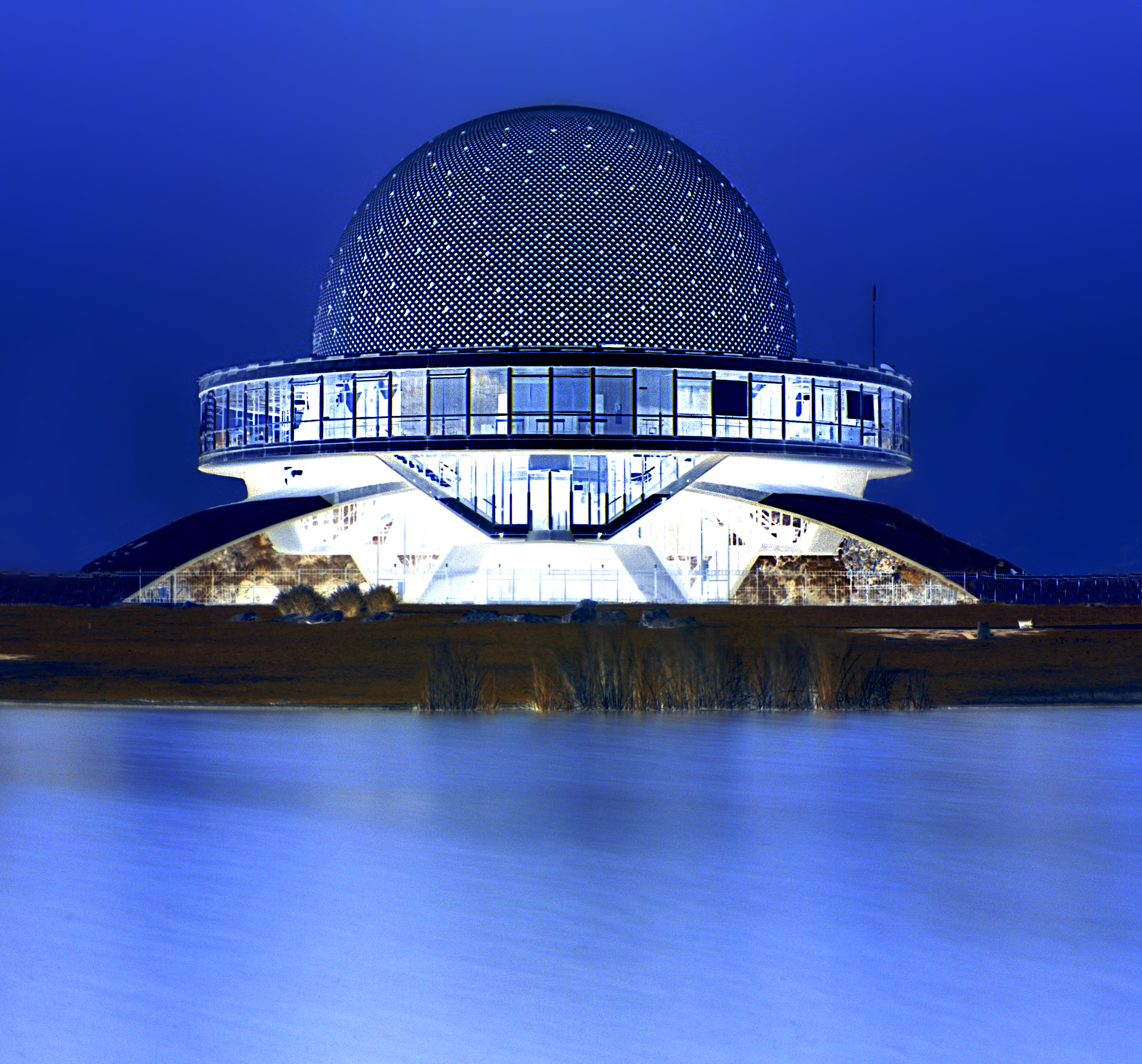
Infrared image of The Planetarium

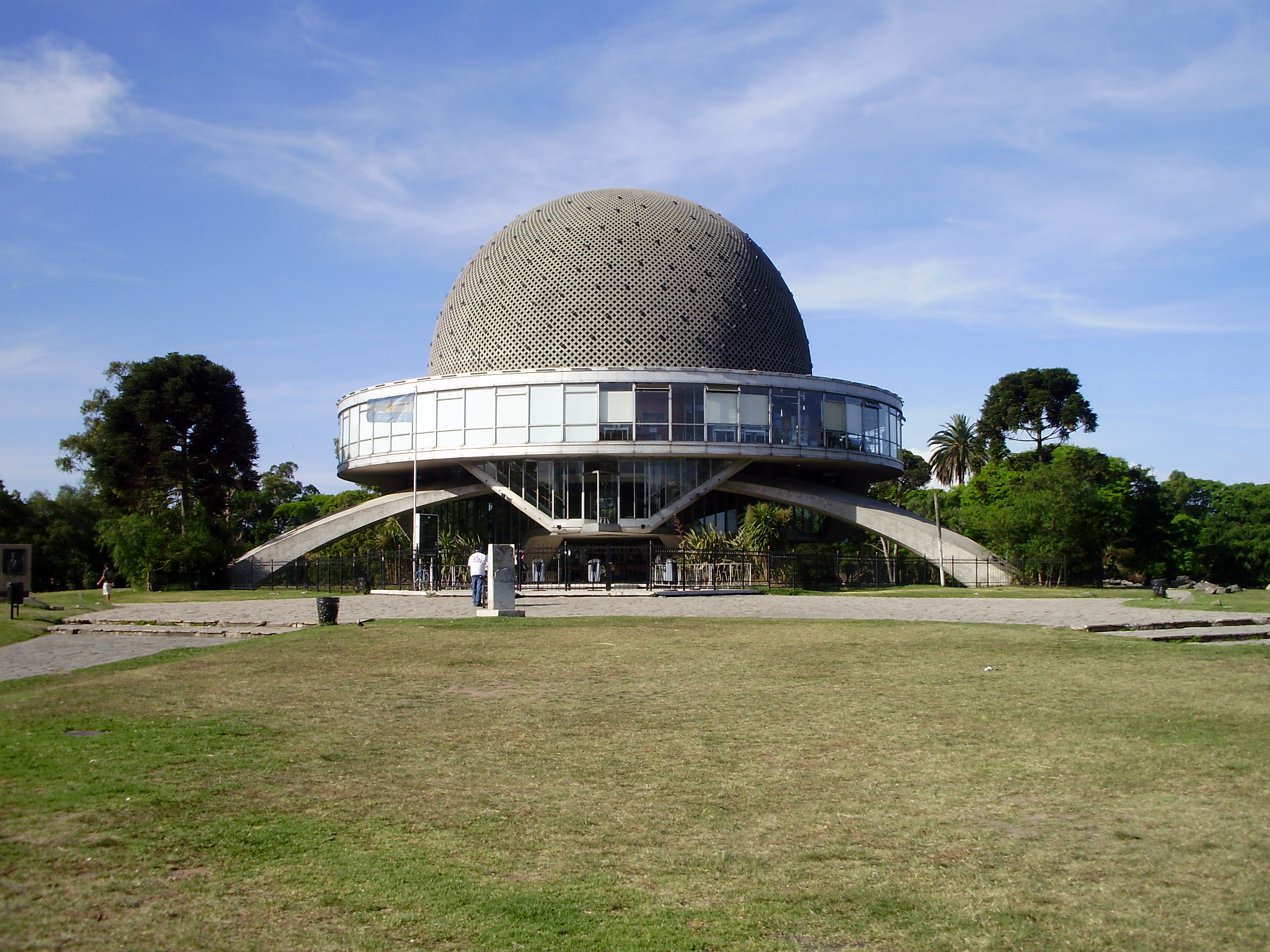
The building during the day

== See also ==
- List of planetariums
