= Club de Pescadores =

Building in Buenos Aires, Argentina

Coordinates: 34°33′47.8″S 58°24′12.5″W

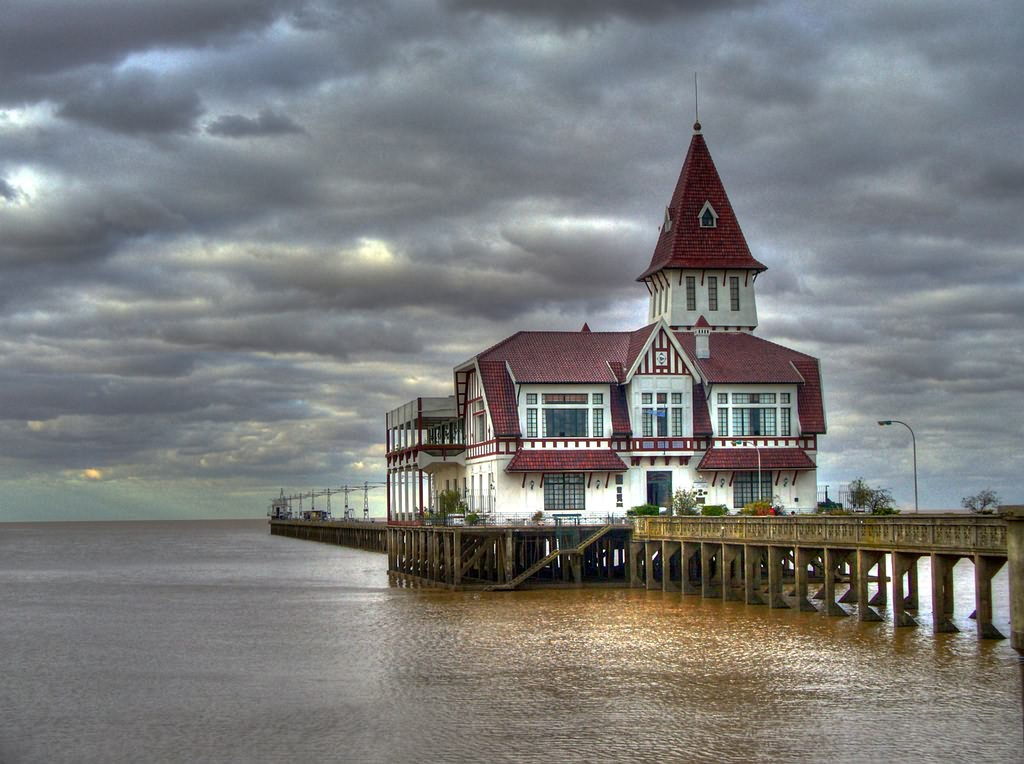
Club de Pescadores, Buenos Aires

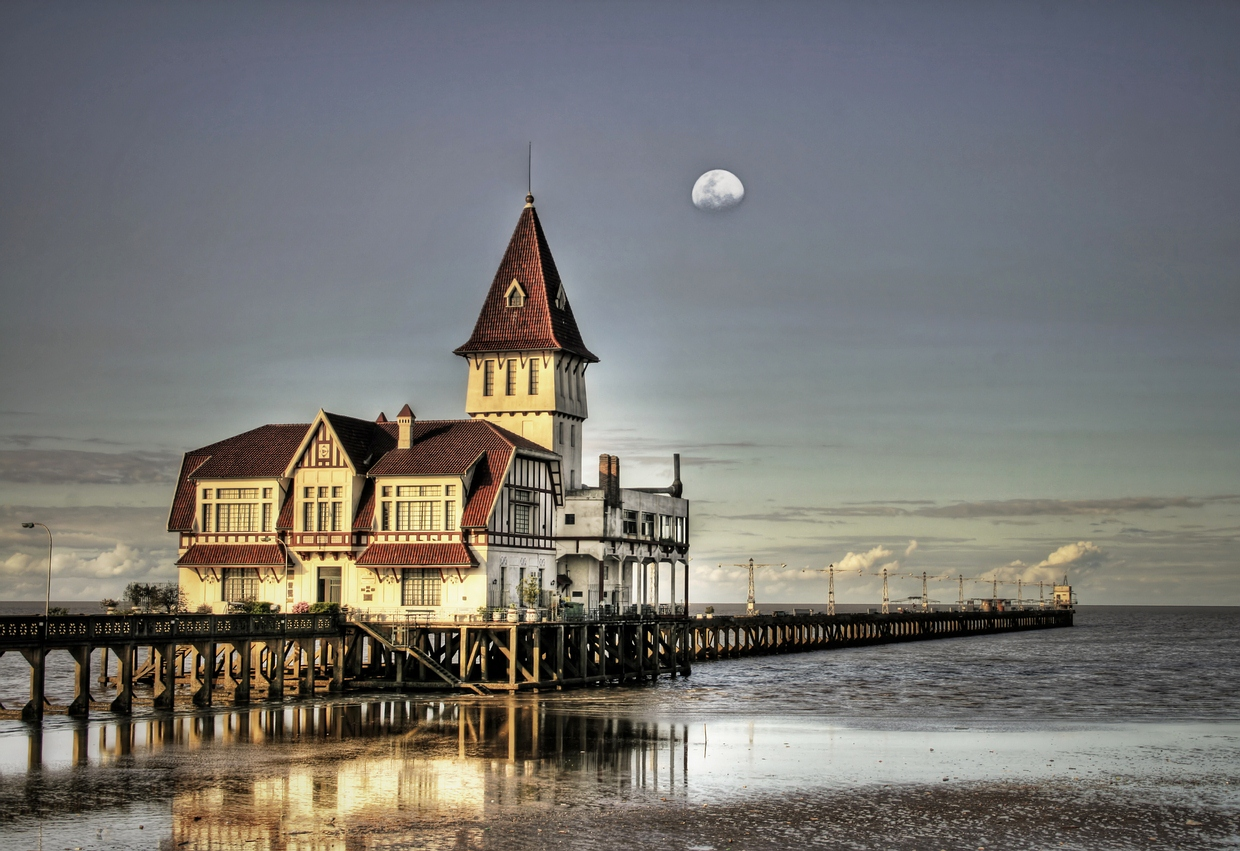
Club de Pescadores, 2007

The Club de Pescadores (Spanish: Fisherman's Club) is situated on the banks of the Río de la Plata in Costanera Norte Avenue, Buenos Aires, Argentina.

The club was founded in 1903 on an old pier built by a French company who used to tie up their coal boats there and discharge the coal into railway wagons waiting alongside. Some time later, when this activity had ceased and the condition of the pier had deteriorated, the fishermen who met there to practice their sport, decided to carry out repairs to the pier and to build a small shelter where they could store their belongings. On 10 August 1905 a violent storm on the river destroyed the pier. Despite this, club members were not put off and later continued their activities which by now included the organisation of regular fishing competitions.

In 1926 a plan was initiated to construct a new pier with a building on it to house the social activities of the club. This received presidential consent in 1928 and construction of the pier was completed in 1930. The building on the pier, still in existence today, was designed by José N. Quartino and officially opened on 16 January 1937 in the presence the Argentina president General Agustín P. Justo.

Declared a national historic monument in 2001, the building has become an icon of the city of Buenos Aires.
