= Wild Boy =

Wild Boy, or variants, may refer to:

== People ==
- Wild Boy of Aveyron (c. 1788–1828), French boy found living wild in the woods
- Peter the Wild Boy (died 1785), boy from Hanover found living wild in the woods

== Books ==
- Wild Boy (novel) 2003 novel by Jill Dawson, fictional retelling of the story of Victor, the Wild Boy of Aveyron
- The Wild Boy, 2001 science fiction novel by Warren Rochelle
- Wild Boy, play about autism by Oliver Goldstick 2016
- Wild Boy of the Woods, from List of Beano comic strips by annual
- Wildboys (comics), fictional characters in the Marvel Universe

== Film and TV ==
- Wild Boy (film), 1934 British film comedy about greyhound betting
- The Wild Child, 1970 French film released in the UK as The Wild Boy
- Wildboyz, a 2003 MTV reality TV series, American spin-off television series and follow-up to Jackass
- Wild Boys, a 2011 Australian TV drama series from the Seven Network about bushrangers in 1860s' colonial New South Wales

== Music ==
- "Wild Boy" (song), a 2011 single by Machine Gun Kelly

== See also ==
- Bigfoot and Wildboy, live action children's television series on ABC, from 1976 part of The Krofft Supershow on Saturday mornings
- Wild Boy and Puppy, porcelain sculpture featuring a yellow cartoon dog, a "wild boy" with red spiky hair, and a bumblebee
- The Wild Boys (disambiguation)
