= Michael Jackson and Bubbles =

Porcelain sculpture by Jeff Koons

- The artist's proof, on display at The Broad
- Artist: Jeff Koons
- Year: 1988
- Medium: Porcelain
- Subject: Michael Jackson
- Dimensions: 110 cm × 179 cm × 83 cm (42 in × 70.5 in × 32.5 in)

Michael Jackson and Bubbles is a porcelain sculpture (42 x 70.5 x 32.5 in) by the American artist Jeff Koons and manufactured in the Italian porcelain factory of Cesare Villari in Solagna, Italy. It was created in 1988 within the framework of his Banality series.

== Description ==
The life-size porcelain sculpture depicts the American singer-songwriter Michael Jackson leaning back on a flower bed. On his lap reclines his domesticated chimpanzee Bubbles who clasps a white cloth. Jackson and his pet form an optical unit. They wear similar clothing, are colored homogeneously and parts of their bodies are paralleled with each other, such as Jackson's right hand and Bubbles' paw. The sculpture has been arranged in a triangular and multi-perspective composition.

== Sculpture ==
Bubbles was Jackson's domestic animal who was bought by the artist from a Texas research facility in 1983. It has been claimed by the media that he was Jackson's best and faithful friend who even joined the singer on his world tours and helped in the household. Jeff Koons used a press photo of Jackson and Bubbles as a template for his sculpture. It is almost identical to the artist's work except for a slight variation of the posture. Koons changed Jackson's direction of view and thus adjusted the composition to the requirements of a sculptural work which has to take into account many different viewing angles.

At the time the sculpture was created, Jackson had already become a world-famous performer. Having achieved a sales record with his album Bad, he was at the pinnacle of his career. Koons artwork can be read as a comment on the great media interest that has been directed at Jackson's life as musician and as a private person.

Three of the Michael Jackson and Bubbles sculpture were made. One was sold at Sotheby's on 15 May 2001, when it was auctioned off to the record price of 5.6 million dollars. The artist's proof is owned by the Broad Art Foundation of businessman and art collector Eli Broad and is displayed in The Broad in Los Angeles. The two other versions are in Oslo in the Astrup Fearnley Museum of Modern Art and in the San Francisco Museum of Modern Art.

== Interpretation ==
Jeff Koons has stated that his works of art should reach the largest possible audience. For this purpose he sought inspiration in entertainment media, pop culture and Christian art. The depiction of a media effective person like Michael Jackson might have helped him to achieve this aim. In the 1980s, which were characterized by a new consumer and media culture, Jackson enjoyed an enormous chart success and became a pop icon. Koons now overemphasized the King of Pop's icon-like manner paralleling him with Christian icons. The artist once said about the sculpture:

I wanted to create him in a very god-like icon manner. But I always liked the radicality of Michael Jackson; that he would do absolutely anything that was necessary to be able to communicate with people.

— Jeff Koons

Koons has stated that he was also inspired by the triangular composition of Michelangelo's Pietà. Furthermore, the work's material reminds of catholic mass-produced figures of saints which are usually manufactured in porcelain and gold leaf. Thus the sculpture becomes a kitschy object that is appealing for a wide public and the art market. Koons claims that he wanted to depict Jackson as a new redemptive figure who enables people to discover their own cultural mythology.

Michael Jackson and Bubbles has also been read as a symbol of the human desire for self-discovery. Jackson demonstrated publicly his childlike personality and tried to reinvent himself by means of plastic surgery. Koons was fascinated by the self transformations of Jackson and the way he played with images such as himself against Bubbles.

== Reception ==
The American artist Paul McCarthy created some sculptures relating to Michael Jackson and Bubbles by Jeff Koons, e.g. Michael Jackson and Bubbles (Gold) from 1997 to 1999 (today in the Christian Flick Collection) or Michael Jackson Fucked Up (Big Head) from 2002.

== Exhibitions ==
In 2012 the Liebieghaus in Frankfurt attracted attention displaying Michael Jackson and Bubbles next to Egyptian mummies and thus established an aesthetic and ironic dialogue between the objects.

== Bibliography ==
- Vinzenz Brinkmann, Jeff Koons – The Sculptor. Exh. Cat. "Jeff Koons, the Painter & the Sculptor", Liebieghaus Skulpturensammlung, Schirn Kunsthalle Frankfurt, 20 June - 23 September 2012, Ostfildern 2012.
