= Bubbles (chimpanzee) =

Chimpanzee once owned by Michael Jackson

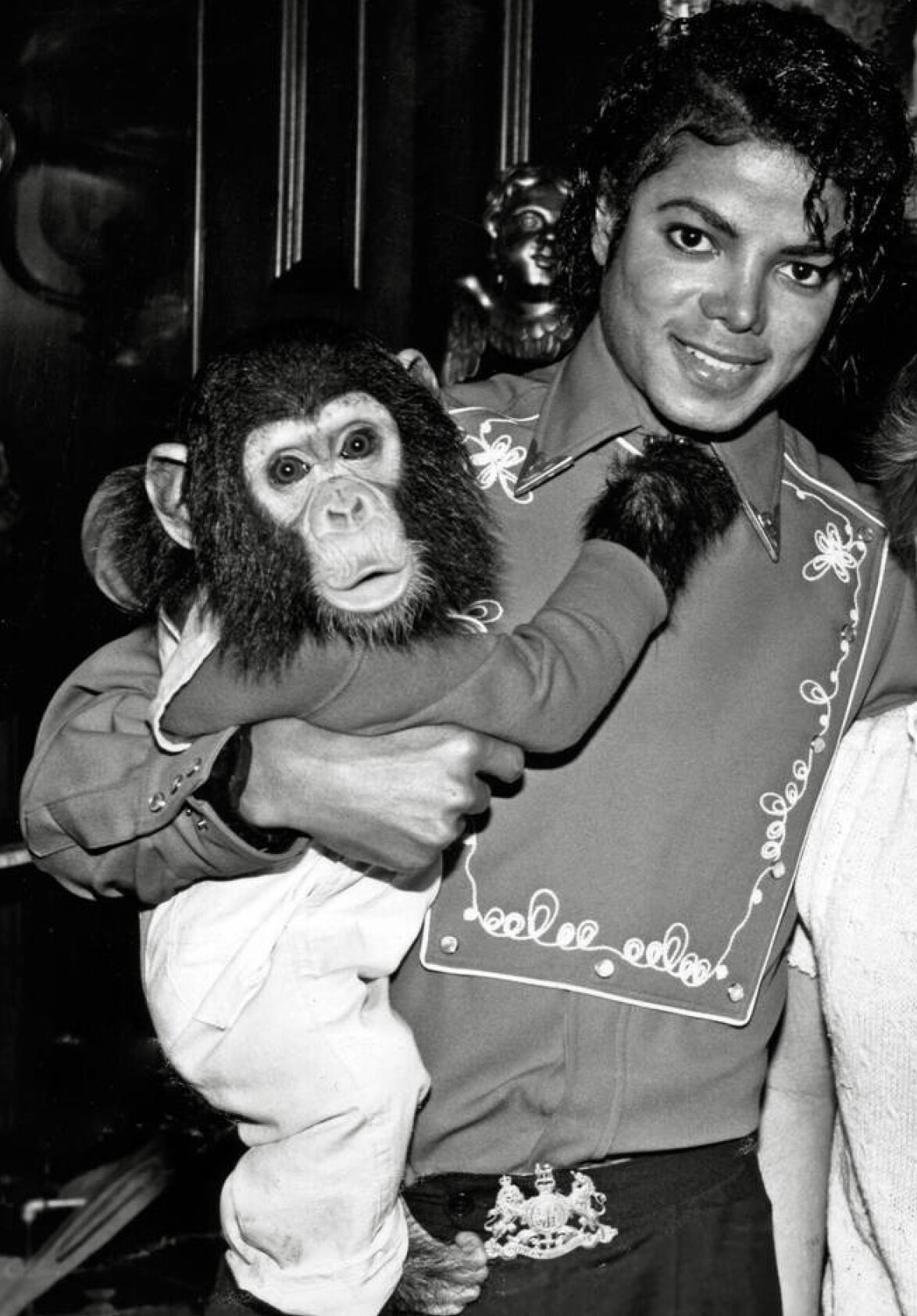
- With Michael Jackson in 1986
- Species: Chimpanzee
- Sex: Male
- Born: 1983 (age 42–43); Austin, Texas, U.S.
- Known for: Being the pet of Michael Jackson
- Owners: Michael Jackson (1980s–2005); Center for Great Apes (2005–present)
- Weight: 185 lb (84 kg)

Bubbles (born 1983) is a chimpanzee once kept as a pet by the American singer Michael Jackson, who bought him from a Texas research facility in the 1980s. Bubbles frequently traveled with Jackson, drawing attention in the media. In 1987, during the Bad world tour in Osaka, Bubbles and Jackson drank tea with the Osaka mayor, Yasushi Oshima.

Bubbles was initially kept at the Jackson family home in Encino, Los Angeles, but was moved to Jackson's home, Neverland Ranch, in 1988. There, he slept in a crib in Jackson's bedroom, used Jackson's toilet and ate Jackson's candy in the Neverland movie theater.

By 2003, Bubbles had matured into a large and aggressive adult chimpanzee unsuitable as a pet, like many captive chimpanzees, and was sent to a California animal trainer. When the trainer closed his operation in 2004, Bubbles was moved to the Center for Great Apes, a sanctuary in Wauchula, Florida, where he has lived since 2005.

== Life ==
=== Acquisition ===
Bubbles was born in 1983 in a research facility in Austin, Texas, that bred primates for animal testing. There are conflicting reports as to how he came into Jackson's possession; many state that Jackson had purchased him when he was eight months old. The acquisition was said to have been supervised by Bob Dunn, then one of Hollywood's most famous suppliers and trainers of animals for films, photoshoots and advertisements.

=== Late 1980s ===
Bubbles was kept at the Jackson family's Encino home until 1988, when he was moved to Jackson's new home, Neverland Ranch, in Santa Barbara County, California. Bubbles slept in a crib in Jackson's bedroom, ate candy in the Neverland film theater, was fed at the dining table, wore a diaper, and used Jackson's toilet. At Jackson's 2005 trial, Jackson said that his chimpanzees helped with housekeeping chores: "They run around, help me clean the room. They help me dust, clean the window." Jackson's housekeepers testified that they disapproved of the chimpanzee behavior. One said she had to clean feces hurled at the bedroom wall, and another described a chimpanzee tearing off his diaper before crawling into Jackson's bed.

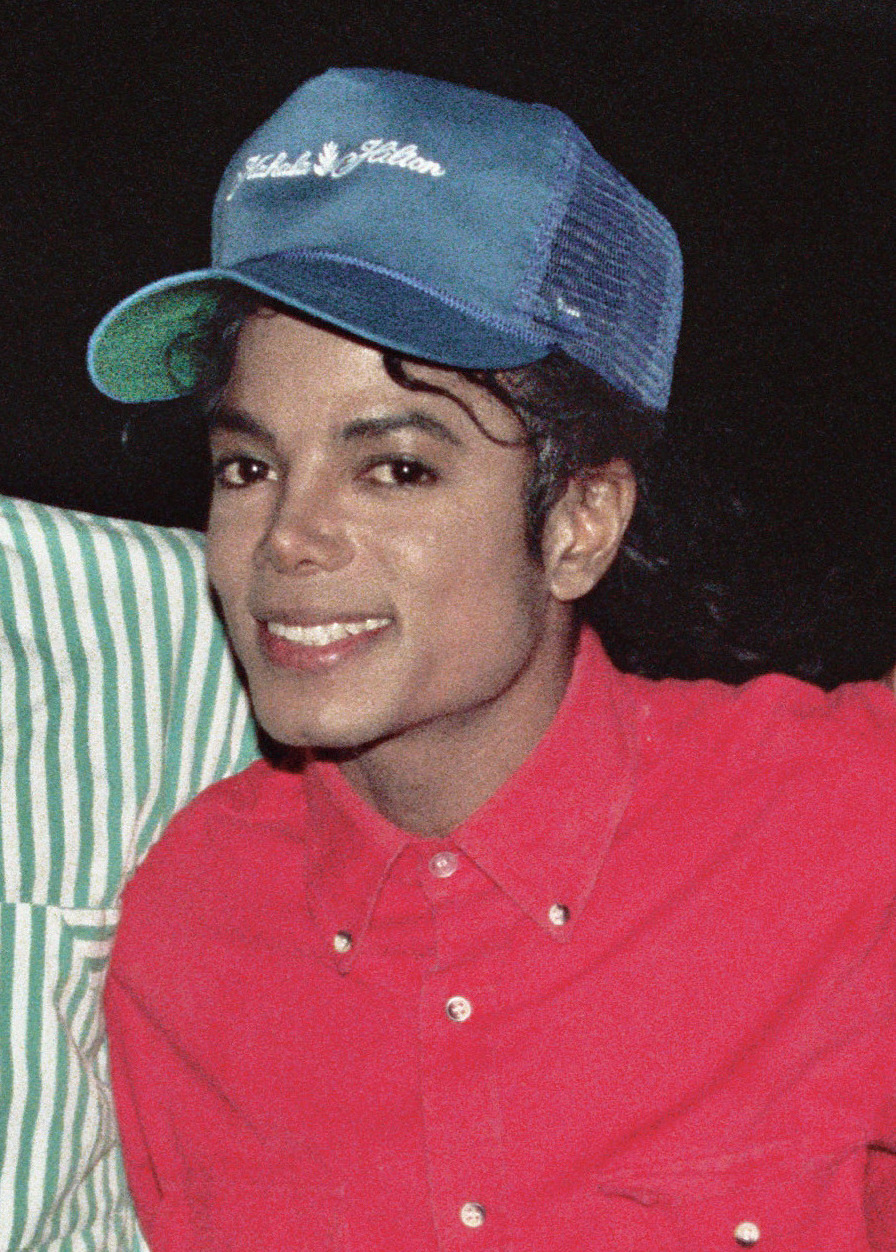
Michael Jackson had Bubbles accompany him throughout the late 1980s.

During the late 1980s, Jackson took Bubbles on outings and would often talk to him. According to reports, he showed him how to moonwalk. Bubbles had an agent and was rumored to have his own bodyguard. He sat in for the recording of Jackson's album Bad (1987)—Jackson insisted that Bubbles and Jackson's pet snake attend as spectators—and accompanied Jackson for the filming of the "Bad" music video. Bubbles made a cameo in the video for "Liberian Girl".

When the Bad world tour began in September 1987, Bubbles and Jackson shared a two-bedroom hotel suite in Tokyo. Bubbles and Jackson made a social visit to the Mayor of Osaka, Yasushi Oshima; there, Bubbles drank Japanese green tea while seated quietly next to Jackson. Oshima said that he and his fellow officials were "surprised to see the chimpanzee, but we understand he is [Michael's] good friend ... This is the first time an animal ever entered City Hall." Though allowed to travel to Japan, Bubbles was unable to enter the United Kingdom and Sweden due to strict quarantine laws. Jackson also brought Bubbles for tea at Elizabeth Taylor's house. Taylor did not mind that Jackson had brought a chimpanzee. At a party to celebrate and promote Bad, Bubbles reportedly "worked the room" and was "the life of the party".

Around this time, Bubbles and Jackson were photographed by Kenny Rogers for his book, Your Friends and Mine. The photo shows Bubbles held on Jackson's hip. In the black and white photograph, Bubbles is dressed casually in a long-sleeved shirt and overalls. Jackson is also dressed casually; he wears jeans and a simple shirt. Rogers said: "Bubbles was so human it was almost frightening. He would take Christopher [Rogers' son] by the hand, walk over to the refrigerator, open it, take out a banana and hand it to him. Christopher was amazed... we all were."

According to author David Wigg, Queen singer Freddie Mercury grew frustrated trying to record a duet with Jackson, "There Must Be More to Life Than This", because of Jackson's insistence that Bubbles be in the studio. According to Wigg, "Michael made Bubbles sit between them and would turn to the chimp between takes and ask, 'Don't you think that was lovely?' Or, 'Do you think we should do that again?' After a few days of this, Freddie just exploded ... 'I'm not performing with a fucking chimp sitting next to me each night.'" Mercury left the project and released the song as a solo artist in 1985. The duet with Jackson remained unreleased until the Queen members Brian May and Roger Taylor discovered it and included it on the album Queen Forever in 2014.

=== Relocations ===
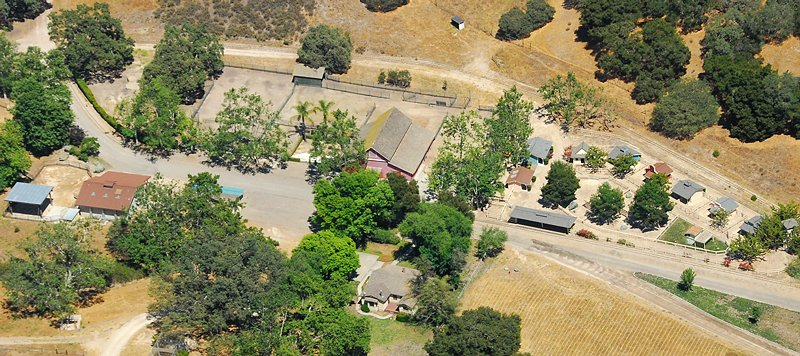
Bubbles lived at Jackson's home, Neverland Ranch, until he became too aggressive.

In the 2003 documentary Living with Michael Jackson, Jackson told the journalist Martin Bashir that Bubbles had become pugnacious. He was moved to an animal sanctuary over fears he might attack Jackson's newborn son, Prince Michael II. (Note: Primatologist Jane Goodall writes that while some chimpanzees may be seen as "cute, funny and even lovable", to think that they would make good pets is inaccurate. She notes that at about 6 to 8 years of age, the animals become strong and indocile.) Bubbles' removal was a source of regret for Jackson. During the interview, Bashir was also told of how Jackson had planned to hold a "celebrity animal party" for Bubbles; Cheeta, Benji and Lassie were to be invited. At Jackson's 2005 trial, it was reported that Bubbles had been replaced by another chimpanzee named Max.

Bubbles was relocated to Bob Dunn's ranch in Sylmar, California. Dunn said at the time: "Bubbles is an adult chimp and a wild animal. We don't let him out to play." According to CNN, Jackson and his children visited Bubbles and played with the other animals at the ranch. "[Jackson] still acts like a kid around them", Dunn said. The Washington Times, however, claimed Jackson did not visit Bubbles, despite Jackson's representative having stated that he would like to meet him again.

Since the closure of Dunn's facility in 2004, Bubbles has been kept at the Center for Great Apes in Wauchula, Florida, where he is said to enjoy painting and listening to flute music. The annual care for each animal at the center costs around $17,000 as of 2009. Patti Ragan, director for the Center for Great Apes, commented on the animals' daily routine at the sanctuary: "They relax. They take naps together. They might go up in the top of the cupola. They go out in the chutes and lie under a tree in the tunnel system. They groom each other and they fight and they have arguments, too." According to animal keepers at the center, Bubbles—whose facial features have changed since his time with Jackson—is now "huge and ugly", weighing 185 pounds (84 kg), but has a "sweet character". In 2009, Bubbles was spending most of his time sitting quietly in trees with Sam, a 40-year-old chimpanzee.

Bubbles was still alive at 42 years old in 2025, considerably old for a chimpanzee. According to the Center for Great Apes, "Bubbles is difficult to photograph because he does not like the camera. He often will turn his back when he sees a camera ... Bubbles will occasionally spit water or throw sand (with amazing accuracy) at strangers, just to see how they react ... Bubbles' caregivers consider him to be artistic, gentle, and shy." His caregivers described his "sensitive" personality and said he participated in painting.

=== Death of Jackson ===
On June 25, 2009, Jackson died at the age of 50 of acute propofol intoxication. Dunn, speaking to the News of the World, said: "Bubbles definitely missed [Jackson] when they parted and will miss him now. Chimpanzees are intelligent. They remember people and stuff. Bubbles and Michael were close friends and playmates. The last time Michael visited, Bubbles definitely recognized and remembered him." (Note: Jane Goodall notes that chimpanzees become more relaxed around individuals they recognize.) Dunn said that Jackson thought of Bubbles as his first child, and added that he hoped Jackson's children would keep in touch with their "stepbrother" following their father's death. In 2010, Jackson's sister La Toya visited Bubbles at the Center for Great Apes in Florida. According to the Center for Great Apes website, Jackson's estate has continued to support the costs of Bubbles' care.

== Media coverage ==
The public perception of what Michael is as a human being has been highly exaggerated. Those articles are hard for me to relate to. For instance, Bubbles is more fun than a lot of people I know. I saw Bubbles at a wedding in a tux. He has great table manners.

— Quincy Jones

According to the journalist Steve Huey, Bubbles formed a public perception of Jackson as a "bizarre eccentric, obsessed with recapturing his childhood". According to Robert Thompson, professor of popular culture at Syracuse University, Jackson's acquisition of Bubbles was "when the weirdness began to reach mythic proportions".

Chris Heath of Smash Hits magazine called Bubbles "the most famous chimpanzee ever in pop music." In recounting several of the rumors surrounding Bubbles in the media, he quoted Frank DiLeo (Jackson's long-time manager) as saying, "Bubbles is a pet. It's not like he's his [Jackson's] best friend in the whole world [...] He brings him out because he likes to have him do things with kids. I mean, what a great break! Imagine you could afford to keep a monkey. I think everyone in the world would like to own one."

Jackson and Bubbles' bond, as well as Jackson's other alleged eccentricities, contributed to the media nickname "Wacko Jacko", which Jackson came to despise. The media often focused on Bubbles, rather than Jackson's music, and published false stories, such as the allegation that Bubbles was not a single ape, but one of several. A later claim suggested that Bubbles had died; Jackson's press agent Lee Solters told reporters that "when Bubbles heard about his demise he went bananas ... Like Mark Twain, his death is grossly exaggerated and he's alive and doing well."

The media also falsely reported that Bubbles would be the ringbearer at Elizabeth Taylor's wedding at Neverland Ranch in 1991; according to The New York Times, it was "an idea that some newspapers found too delightful not to report". The National Enquirer claimed that the musician Prince had used extrasensory perception to turn Bubbles crazy. According to the story, Jackson said: "What kind of sicko would mess with a monkey? This is the final straw. Poor, poor Bubbles." Jackson found the story hilarious; his staff reported that they had never seen him laugh so much.

== Legacy ==
Jackson launched Michael's Pets, a range of soft toys based on the animals he owned, in November 1986. "He [Jackson] was very instrumental in designing the toys", said Bob Michaelson, who was responsible for developing them. "He was very instrumental in how it should be programmed... he's got tremendous intuition." Jackson, in approving the toys, stipulated that the manufacturers donate $1 per sale to a children's charity.

In 1988, the artist Jeff Koons made three identical porcelain sculptures, Michael Jackson and Bubbles, as part of his Banality exhibit. At the time, each sculpture was said to be worth $250,000. Koons once said: "If I could be one other living person, it would probably be Michael Jackson." The piece became one of Koons' best-known works. The figure shows Jackson and Bubbles wearing gold military-style suits. In 2001, one of the figures was put up for auction and was expected to fetch between $3 million and $4 million. The figure sold to an anonymous telephone bidder for $5.6 million, a record for a work by Koons.

The Daily Telegraph reported in August 2009 that Bubbles was to publish a "tell-all memoir" about his time with Jackson. The book, Bubbles: My Secret Diary, From Swaziland to Neverland, is a spoof diary by journalist John Blake, and the book fictionally documents the "darker aspects" of Bubbles' life, including a "$2,000-a-day banana addiction, depression, romantic conquests, and [his] 'vicious rivalry' with Tarzan star Cheeta". The "collection of very personal and honest entries from [Bubbles'] diary" was released in October 2009. Blake said:

Behind his seemingly-perfect life of glamorous friends, gold-plated tyre swings, and personal chefs, there is a dark history of medical experiments, addiction and loss. But Bubbles has fought against his personal and professional problems and, with his help of man-pet Michael Jackson, he has grown to become bigger than King Kong—figuratively speaking.

History podcast "World's Greatest Monkeys" alleged that the ownership of Bubbles was also inspired by the ownership of previous chimpanzee Scatter by Elvis Presley.

== See also ==
- List of individual apes
- Pet monkey

== Bibliography ==
- Anderson, Christopher P. (1994). Michael Jackson Unauthorized. Simon & Schuster. ISBN 978-0-671-89239-5.
- Campbell, Lisa (1993). Michael Jackson: The King of Pop. Branden. ISBN 978-0-8283-1957-7.
- Goodall, Jane (2000). Through a Window: My Thirty Years with the Chimpanzees of Gombe. Houghton Mifflin Harcourt. ISBN 978-0-618-05677-4.
- Li, You-Sheng (2005). A New Interpretation of Chinese Taoist Philosophy: An Anthropological/Psychological View. Taoist Recovery Centre. ISBN 978-0-9738410-0-8.
- Rees, Dafydd; Crampton, Luke (1991). Rock Movers & Shakers. Billboard Books. ISBN 978-0-8230-7609-3.
- Taraborrelli, J. Randy (2004). The Magic and the Madness. Headline. ISBN 978-0-330-42005-1.
- Warner, Jay (2006). On this Day in Black Music History. Hal Leonard Corporation. ISBN 978-0-634-09926-7.
