= Center for Great Apes =

Animal sanctuary near Wauchula, Florida, United States

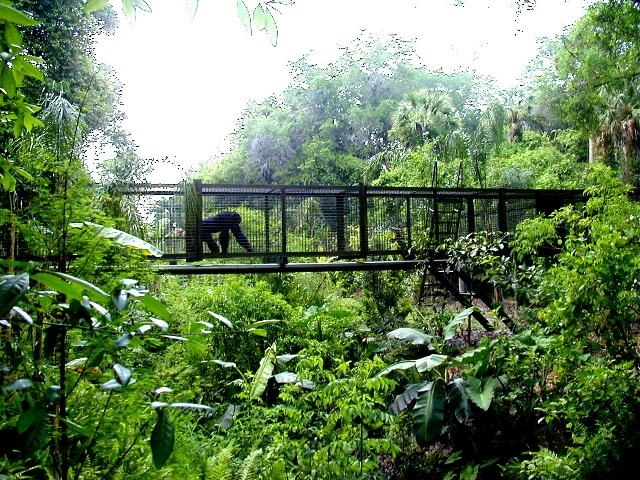
- View within the sanctuary, showing part of the 2 miles of aerial trailways animals can use to explore.
- Interactive map of Center for Great Apes
- Date opened: 1993
- Location: Wauchula, Florida
- No. of animals: 71
- No. of species: 27 orangutans 44 chimpanzees
- Website: centerforgreatapes.org

Center for Orangutan and Chimpanzee Conservation, Inc.
- Tax ID no.: 65-0444725
- Revenue: $1,956,713 (2015)

The Center for Great Apes is an animal sanctuary for great apes located east of Wauchula, Florida. Founded as a nonprofit organization in 1993, the sanctuary has about 70 orangutans and chimpanzees who were formerly used in entertainment, scientific research, or the exotic pet trade. The sanctuary sits on 100 acres of land in rural Florida, southwest of Orlando.

The sanctuary is a founding member of North American Primate Sanctuary Alliance (NAPSA) and is accredited by the Global Federation of Animal Sanctuaries. As such, it is not open to the general public as an attraction or zoo.

The backstory of six of the chimpanzees at the Center for Great Apes was featured in the TV documentary series Chimp Crazy. As a result of a People for the Ethical Treatment of Animals lawsuit, they were removed from a facility in Missouri and sent to the sanctuary in 2021.

The Center for Great Apes is the only accredited orangutan sanctuary in the United States.

== Notable residents ==
- Bubbles was the former companion of Michael Jackson.
- Bella was the star of the CareerBuilder 2004 Super Bowl XL campaign.
- Sam "Sammy" starred in the 1996 film Dunston Checks In.
- Sandra was declared a "non-human person" in Argentina after spending 20 years at Buenos Aires Zoo.
- Sunshine was born in the United Kingdom where her mother was owned by singer Tom Jones' manager.
- Bo and Joe (formerly at CW Exotics facility) featured in the Netflix series Tiger King.
- Marco is the oldest and smallest chimpanzee at the Center for Great Apes.
- Jonah and Jacob are twins. Jonah starred with Mark Wahlberg in the 2001 film Planet of the Apes, and with his twin brother, appeared in the original "Trunk Monkey" commercials.
- Mari the orangutan, is one of several apes taken care of by the Center for Great Apes who have special needs. Mari lost both arms as an infant before arriving at the sanctuary.
- Knuckles, a chimpanzee, had cerebral palsy.
- Allie has Chronic Inflammatory Demyelinating Polyneuropathy (CIDP), a condition that, in Allie's case, prevents the use of her legs or feet.

== Gallery ==
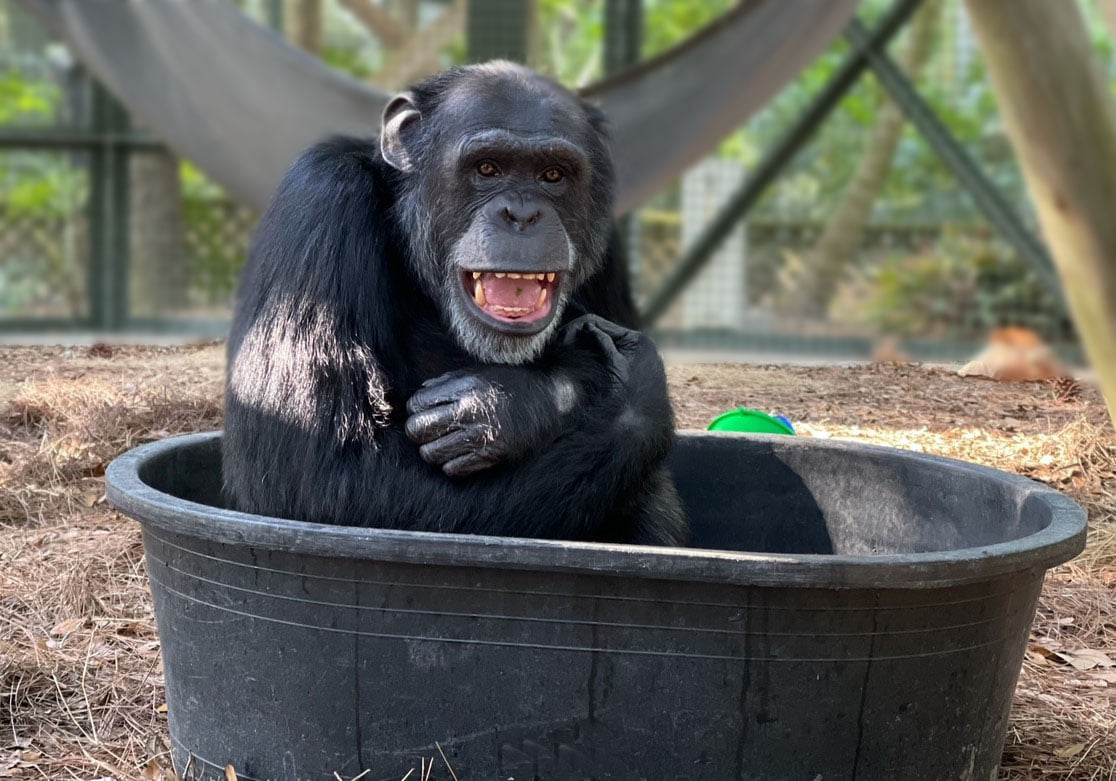
Jonah, a chimpanzee, plays in a tub.

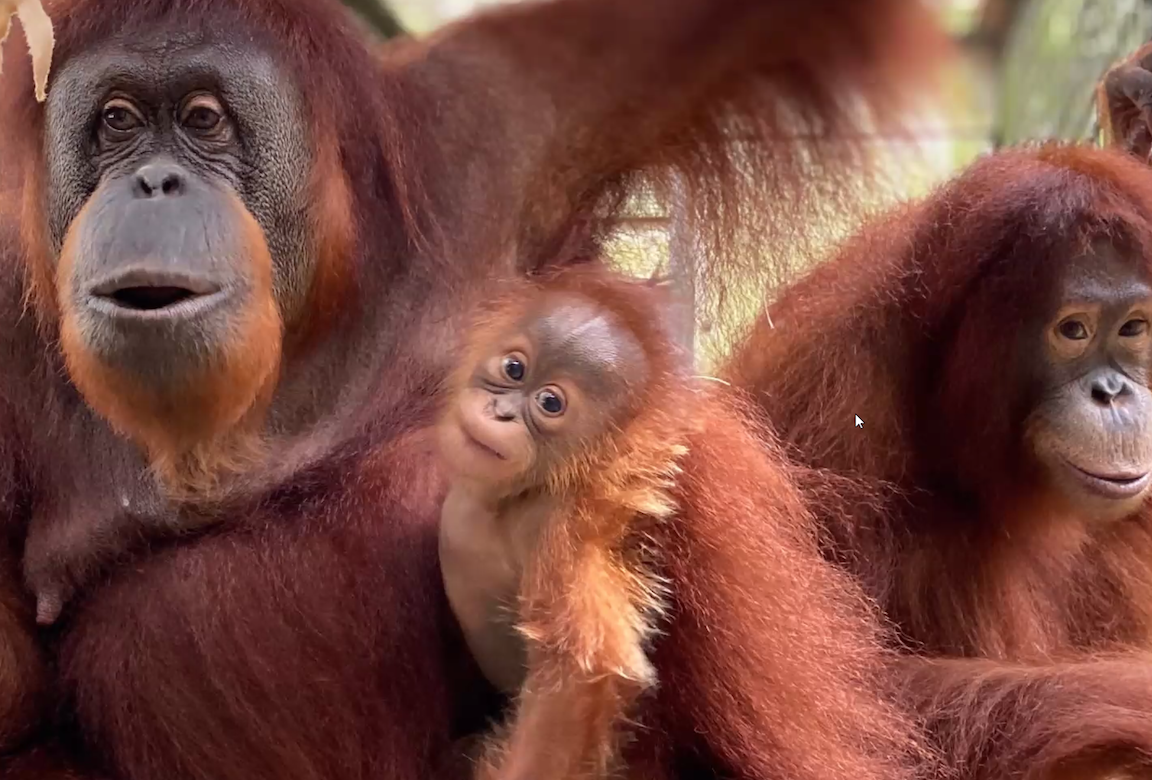
Sunshine with her daughter Cahaya and friend Keagan.

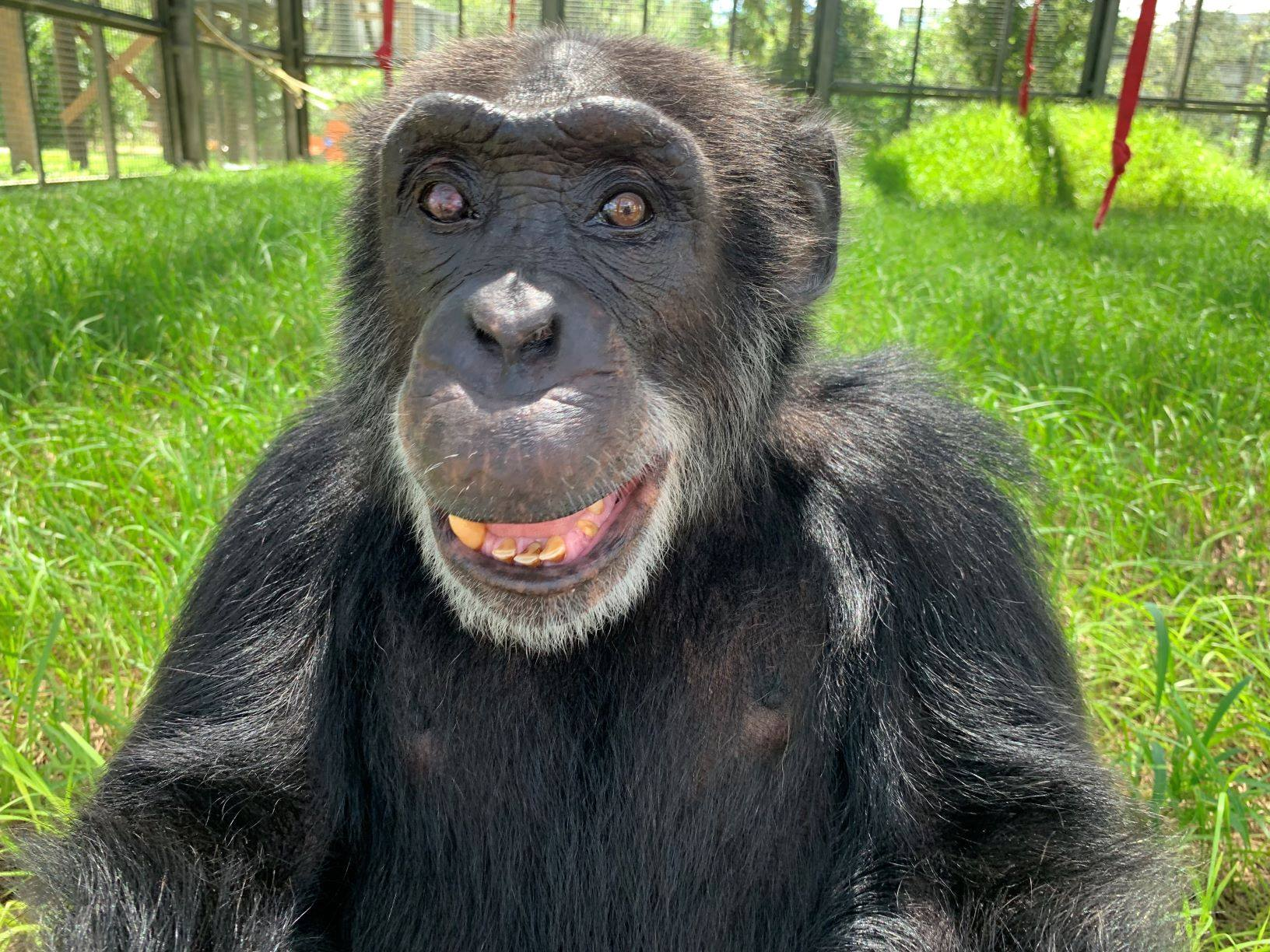
Marco, the chimpanzee.

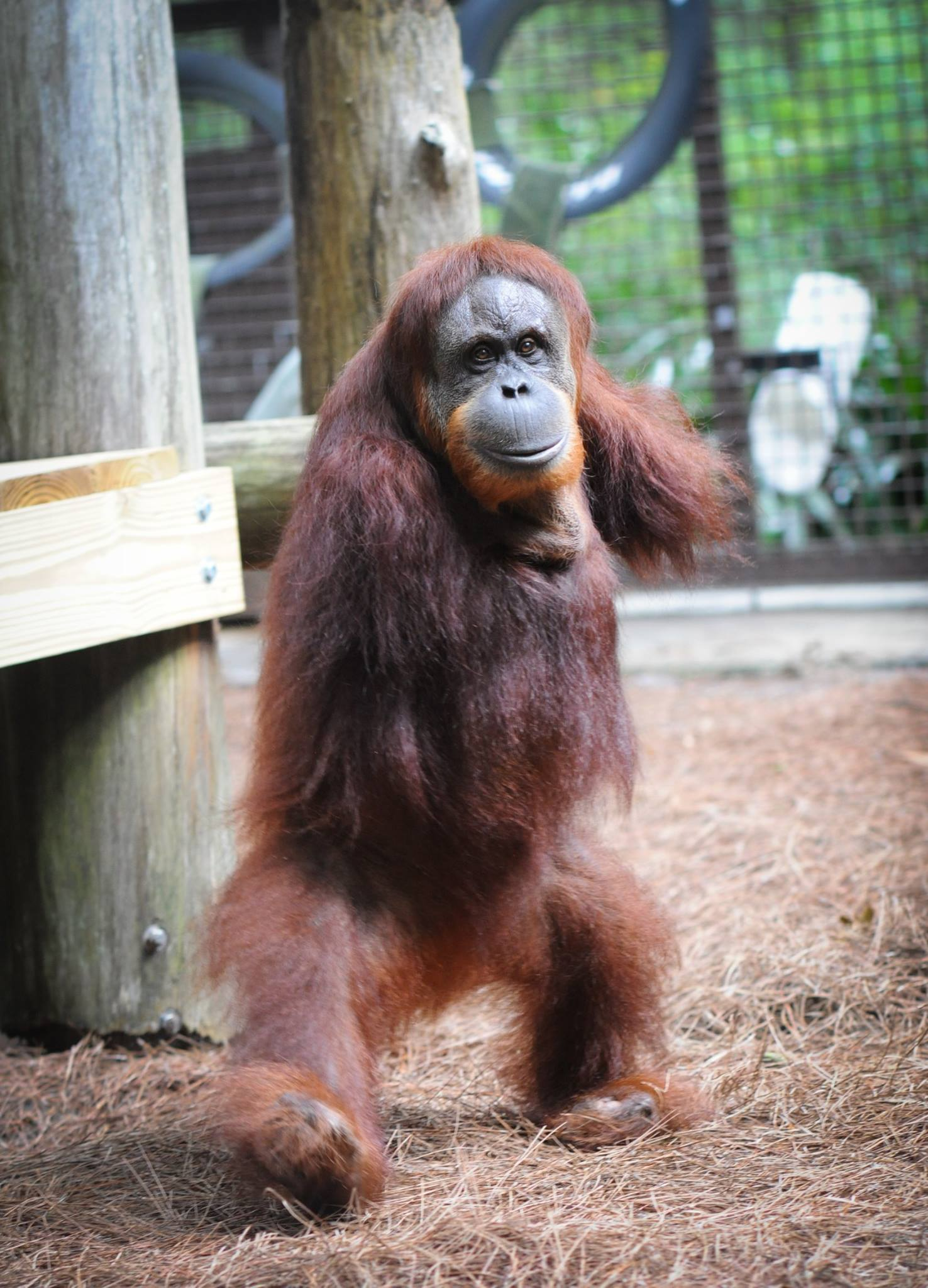
Mari, a Sumatran orangutan, has no arms due to an accident prior to her arrival at the center.
