= Lee Solters =

American press agent (1919–2009)

- Born: June 23, 1919
- Died: May 18, 2009 (aged 89)
- Education: New York University
- Occupation: Publicist

Lee Solters (born Nathan Cohen, June 23, 1919 – May 18, 2009) was an American press agent and publicist known for his flamboyant promotional style and long career representing prominent figures in entertainment, theater, and music. For over 60 years, he handled publicity for more than 300 Broadway productions, including My Fair Lady, The King and I, and Funny Girl, and for performers including Yul Brynner, Barbra Streisand, the Beatles, and Led Zeppelin.

Solters was best known for his 26-year collaboration with Frank Sinatra and his publicity stunts that helped shape modern celebrity promotion. Prior to entering public relations, he served as a Stars and Stripes writer during World War II and later co-founded several major agencies including Solters & O'Rourke and Solters/Roskin/Friedman, with offices in New York and Los Angeles.

== Early life and career ==
Born Nathan Cohen in Brooklyn, New York on June 23, 1919, to Jewish parents (Jacob and Gussie) Cohen, Solters attended New York University, where he studied advertising and journalism. After being drafted into the United States Army, he became a writer for Stars and Stripes, the official newspaper of the United States Armed Forces.

After leaving military service, he went into the public relations business with his own company in 1948, achieving early success with stories about clients planted in the columns of Army Archerd, Hedda Hopper and Walter Winchell. He had as many as 60 employees working for him, resisting offers to be bought out by other firms over the years with his insistence that he remain his own boss. Solters began to gain success as his firm Solters & O'Rourke (with partner James J. O'Rourke) gathered clients. Broadway publicist Harvey Sabinson joined the firm, adding his theater division, changing the company's name to Solters, O'Rourke and Sabinson. When Sabinson left to head the League of N.Y. Theatres and Producers, the firm was renamed Solters/Roskin (later Solters/Roskin/Friedman) with Solters heading the west coast branch (in Los Angeles) and Sheldon Roskin heading the east coast branch (in New York City). Monroe Friedman was added to the firm's partnership, assisting Solters on the west coast. A collection of press materials generated by the agency is part of the permanent collection of the New York Public Library.

In 1991, after 35 years, Solters parted ways with Roskin and Friedman to form his own agency.

From 2001 to 2009, Solters was partnered with Jerry Digney in Solters & Digney Public Relations.

== Notables represented ==
Among the celebrities he represented were Yul Brynner, Carol Channing, Jackie Gleason, Cary Grant, Barbra Streisand and Mae West. The firm also represented political figures, such as Gary Hart, pop groups, including the rap group 2 Live Crew, and corporate clients, such as FirstAir.

After reports spread in 1990 of the death of Bubbles, the chimpanzee companion of his client Michael Jackson, Solters told the press that "When Bubbles heard about his demise he went bananas". He represented Dolly Parton and would say he knew her "since she was flat-chested". In a press stunt, Solters had a New York City cabdriver deliver a poodle to Claudette Colbert that she was said, falsely, to have left in his car, creating a great photo of Colbert with the dog.

=== Plays and musicals ===
Solters worked on promotion of some 300 plays and musicals, such as the original Broadway theatre productions of Camelot, Funny Girl, Guys and Dolls, The King and I and My Fair Lady. When one of David Merrick's plays was struggling to get audiences, Solters placed ads that featured quotes from people whose names had been selected out of the phone book because they matched those of noted theater reviewers.

=== Las Vegas and Frank Sinatra ===
While representing Caesars Palace in Las Vegas, Solters first met Frank Sinatra. Solters followed Sinatra on his tour to ensure that Sinatra would be connected with the hotel. Solters told Sinatra that he wasn't impressed with his existing publicist and suggested that Solters would invite columnists in each city where he performed to meet the star five minutes before he went on stage to give the reporters a rarely obtained chance to speak directly with Sinatra. The New Yorker recounted that "The first columnist they tried this on was Larry Fields of the Philadelphia Daily News, whose wife fainted when Sinatra kissed her cheek. 'Take care of it, Lee,' Sinatra said, and he was off." After the concert, Fields wrote a glowing review. Solters used the same technique in succeeding cities and built much positive press for the singer. When he returned to Las Vegas, Sinatra's attorney Mickey Rudin informed Solters that "You're taking over" Sinatra's publicity. The professional relationship with Sinatra lasted for 26 years.

=== Rock groups ===
He represented the Beatles' Apple Corp., as well as Eagles and Led Zeppelin. His efforts led to Pope John Paul II being named in 2000 as an honorary member of the Harlem Globetrotters in a ceremony orchestrated in front of a crowd of 50,000 in Saint Peter's Square. In the 1970s, Solters won a competition over several other agencies for an account with a Detroit automaker by waving his client list and stating "That's my presentation."

== Death and tribute ==
Solters died at age 89 on May 18, 2009, at his home in West Hollywood, California. He is survived by a daughter and a son, two grandchildren and a great-grandson.

In an account related to The New York Times in 2004, Danny Goldberg, later founder of Artemis Records, led the article by recounting that "One of my big influences was Lee Solters". Solters hired Goldberg in 1973 and gave him jazz saxophonist Stan Getz as a client. Goldberg struggled with his promotion efforts, as Getz didn't have a new album out and he couldn't get music writers to cover him. At the suggestion of Solters, Goldberg staged a birthday party for Getz and other musicians, an event that was covered by three television networks. Later, as the only person on the company who had ever listened to the group, Solters assigned Goldberg to represent Led Zeppelin, which gave him the contacts and persona he needed to succeed in the rock business.
