= The Wild Boys =

The Wild Boys may refer to:

- The Wild Boys (novel), a 1971 novel by William S. Burroughs
- "The Wild Boys" (song), a 1984 single by Duran Duran, named after the novel
- The Wild Boys (film), a 2017 film by Bertrand Mandico
- The Wild Boys (play) a 1970s British play by Peter Richardson, based on the William S. Burroughs novel

== See also ==
- Wild Boys, a 2011 Australian TV series from the Seven Network
- Wildboyz, a 2003 MTV reality TV series
- Wild Boy (disambiguation)
