= Sandra (orangutan) =

Orangutan involved in a legal case

- Other name: Marisa
- Species: orangutan
- Breed: hybrid of Borneo and Sumatra
- Sex: female
- Born: February 14, 1986 (age 40); Rostock Zoo, East Germany
- Residence: Center for Great Apes
- Offspring: Shembira/Gembira

Sandra (born February 14, 1986, in Rostock Zoo in East Germany) is an orangutan, currently living in the Center for Great Apes in Florida after being moved from the Buenos Aires Zoo in 2019.

Sandra was involved in a historic legal case in Argentina over whether an orangutan could receive legal protections as a "nonhuman person."

== Biography ==
Sandra as born on Valentine's Day at Rostock Zoo in East Germany. She is a hybrid orangutan of the two separate species of Borneo and Sumatra orangutans. Sandra (then called Marisa) was transferred to other zoos in Germany, then to Argentina on September 17, 1994. At the Buenos Aires Zoo, the name of the orangutan was changed to Sandra.

At Buenos Aires Zoo, Sandra lived in a concrete and steel bar cage. Sandra had a baby boy called Gembira, born in March 1999, but she was separated from him when he was transferred to Xixiakou Wild Animal Park in Rongcheng, China. At one point, Sandra was transferred to Cordoba Zoo. The zoos wanted Sandra to breed with an orangutan named Max, but the effort failed because Sandra preferred sitting outside in the rain and snow over nesting with Max.

Sandra lived alone for several years, during which time an animal welfare group, AFADA, took Sandra's case to court to claim "personhood" rights for her.

== Legal status determinations ==
On December 18, 2014, Sandra was termed by the court in Argentina as a "subject of rights" in an unsuccessful habeas corpus case regarding the release of the orangutan from captivity at the Buenos Aires zoo. The decision turning down the habeas corpus application also led to the court's direction to prosecute alleged cruelty by the zoo through the prosecutor's office in Buenos Aires in 2015. The brief "subject of rights" statement left the status of the orangutan Sandra as a "non-human being" uncertain legally, until on October 21, 2015, Justice Elena Amanda Liberatori ruled in an amparo case with Sandra that the orangutan is "a non-human person" (Spanish: "una persona no humana") and ordered the city of Buenos Aires to provide what is "necessary to preserve her cognitive abilities". A few days after the decision, both sides said they would appeal.

Initially, it was reported widely in the media that Sandra was declared a "non-human person" by the court on December 18, 2014, but that was a legal interpretation by the association of lawyers for animal rights in Argentina, ALFADA, that was pursuing court cases on behalf of Sandra, and was not explicitly in the wording of the court statement, until Justice Liberatori interpreted the previous ruling in her decision. The judge said in her ruling that Sandra still would not have personhood rights like a human being. That decision that Sandra was a non-human person was reversed a year later by the appellate court of Buenos Aires.

In most legal jurisdictions in the world, a non-human animal is considered an object without rights, or property capable of being owned, bought, and sold, not a subject with rights. In most jurisdictions, there is also a legal distinction between a "person" and a "human being." For instance, a corporation can be a legal "person" without being a "human being".

In 2015, ALFADA pursued the release of Sandra from the Buenos Aires zoo and a legal decision to give her status as a "person" through an amparo application in court, which raised the issue of the legal status and rights of the orangutan under the Codigo Civil Argentino (Argentine Civil Code), under articles 30, 31, 32, 51, 52, 56, and 57. The civil code has two relevant categories, "personas de existencia visible" (visible existing persons), applied to corporeal entities such as minors and disabled persons, and "personas de existencia ideal" (ideal existing persons), applied to legal incorporeal entities such as a corporation given "person" status in the law. Article 51 defines "personas de existencia visible" as having "signos característicos de humanidad" (characteristic signs of humanity). There is no "non-human person" category in the code.

On October 21, 2015, Justice Elena Liberatori ruled that a technical committee would issue a binding decision later on how Sandra would be accommodated with her new rights. That eventually would lead to Sandra's release to a sanctuary.

On June 14, 2016, an appellate court in Buenos Aires reversed the ruling of Justice Liberatori that Sandra was a non-human person.

In 2019, Sandra was transferred to the Sedgwick County Zoo in Kansas and put in quarantine for a month. On Nov. 5, 2019, she arrived at the Center for Great Apes in Wauchula, Florida. Sanctuary director Patti Regan said, "Sandra is very sweet and inquisitive. She was shy when she first arrived, but once she saw the swings, toys, and grassy areas in her new home, she went to explore."

== See also ==
- List of individual apes
