= Buenos Aires Eco-Park =

Zoo in Buenos Aires

Buenos Aires Eco Park
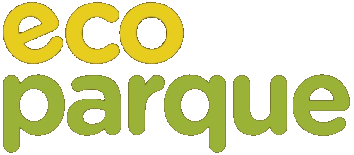

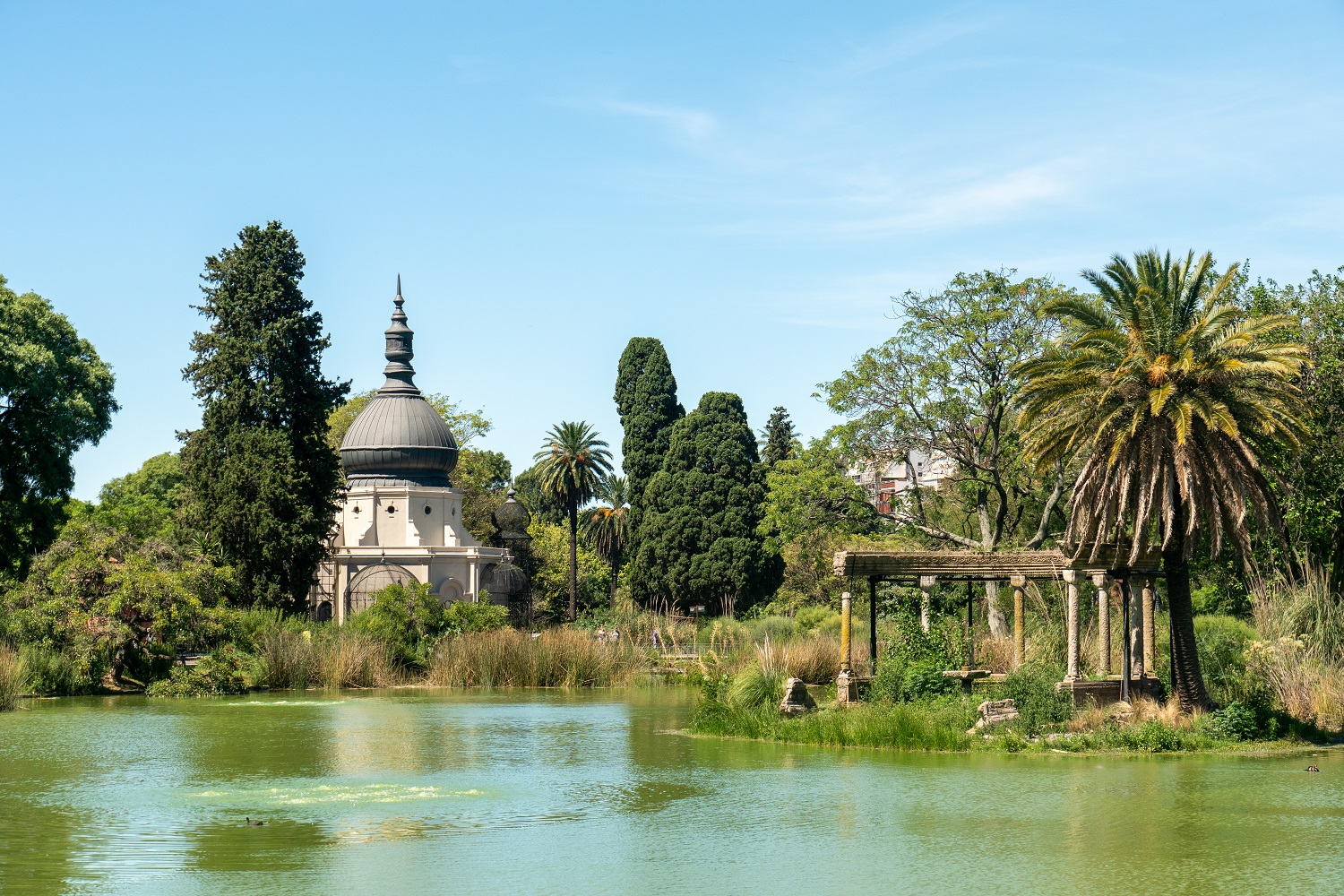
- Interactive map of Buenos Aires Eco Park
- 34°34′51.54″S 58°25′12.09″W
- Date opened: 1888; 138 years ago (closed as zoo in 2016, reopened in 2018)
- Location: Buenos Aires, Argentina
- Land area: 18 hectares (44 acres)
- No. of animals: 2,500
- No. of species: 350
- Memberships: ALPZA, (Note: Initials of "Asociación Latinoamericana de Parques Zoológicos y Acuario") WAZA
- Owner: Government of Buenos Aires
- Website: buenosaires.gob.ar/ecoparque

National Historic Monument of Argentina

The Buenos Aires Eco Park (Spanish: Ecoparque de Buenos Aires) is an 18-hectare (44-acre) park in the Palermo district of Buenos Aires, Argentina. The former zoo, opened in 1888, contained 89 species of mammals, 49 species of reptiles and 175 species of birds, with a total of over 2,500 animals. The institution's goals are to conserve species, produce research and to educate the public. In June 2016 the city formed a bias about the zoo's cruelty. They had to close the 140-year-old zoo and relocate most of the animals to nature reserves, including Temaikèn. The zoo property has been converted into an ecopark.

The zoo (which had been declared National Historic Monument of Argentina in 1997) closed in 2016, reopening as an ecopark in 2018. Its more than 40 historic buildings (that had been declared historical heritage) were refurbished, including the arc at the main entrance, the parrots pavilion, the Byzantine ruins, the Confitería del Aguila, and the herons bridge, among others.

Some of the historic buildings constructed for the former zoo and inherited by the Ecopark include the neo-Gothic "Casa de los Osos" ("Bear House"), the Islamic-influenced "Pabellón de la Jirafa" ("Giraffe Pavilion"), the "Templo de Vesta", which pays homage to a temple dedicated to Hercules, the "Pabellón de los Loros" ("Parrot Pavilion"), donated by the Spanish government, the "Pagoda" where the bears lived, and the "Jaula de los Cóndores" ("Condor Cage").

== History ==
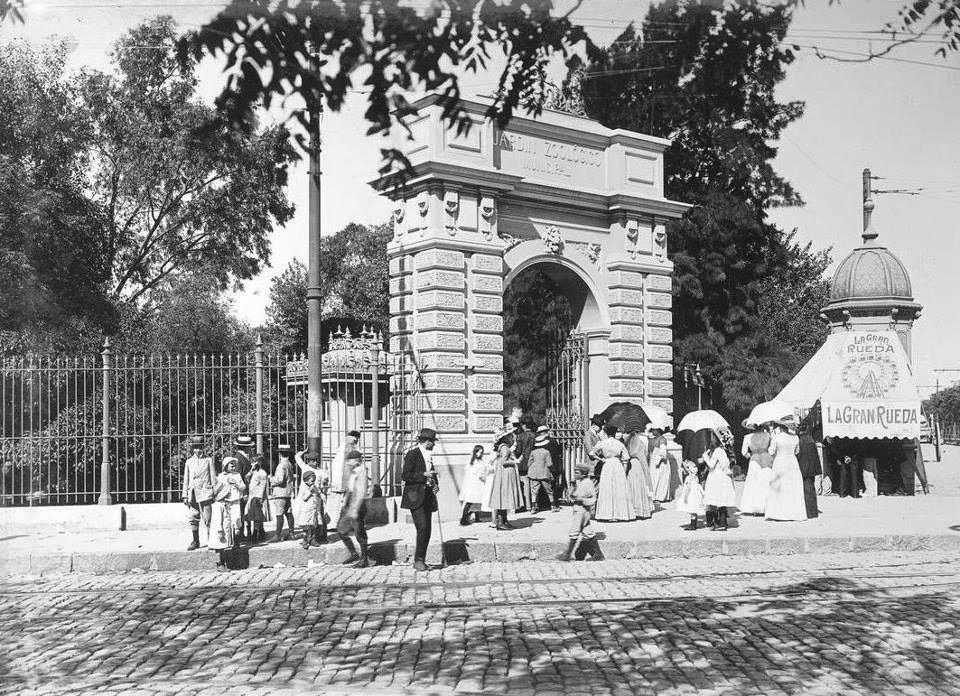
The entrance of the zoo in the corner of Avenida Sarmiento and Avenida del Libertador, circa 1890s

President Domingo Faustino Sarmiento was responsible for the laying out of the Parque Tres de Febrero in land previously owned by Juan Manuel de Rosas. The project was begun in 1874; the park was opened on November 11, 1875, and included a small section dedicated for animals. This area was owned by the Federal Government until 1888 when it was transferred to the City of Buenos Aires. In that year, Mayor Antonio Crespo created the "Buenos Aires Zoo", and separated it from the rest of the park.

Its first director Eduardo Ladislao Holmberg was appointed in 1888 and stayed in that position for 15 years. He was the major designer of the zoo. Holmberg completed the assignment of the different parks, lakes and avenues, and began the exhibition of the 650 animals that the zoo had at that time. In that period zoos around the world did not have the same function as they do today; their main goal was recreational, and they had less space for animals and a large recreational area for visitors.

Clemente Onelli was the director from 1904 to 1924 and promoted the Zoo Gardens. Onelli added pony, elephant and camel rides to the zoo and increased the number of visitors (from 1,500 to 15,000) during his first year of office. He is also responsible for most of the Romanesque buildings at the zoo.

Adolfo Holmberg, nephew of the first director, took over as directory in 1924 and headed the zoo until 1944, after which a succession of political appointees let the zoo deteriorate. In 1991 the zoo was privatized, and the program to get the animals out from behind bars and into more naturalistic habitats began. The zoo's last polar bear, Winner, died of fever in 2012.

In December 2014, a Buenos Aires court ruled that a 29-year-old female Sumatran orangutan named Sandra living at the zoo was a "non-human person" who was entitled to some basic rights and could be liberated from her enclosure. In May 2020 Elephant Mara, who had been living in the zoo since 1995, was moved and released to the Mato Grosso Elephant Sanctuary in Brazil.

== Animals and exhibits ==
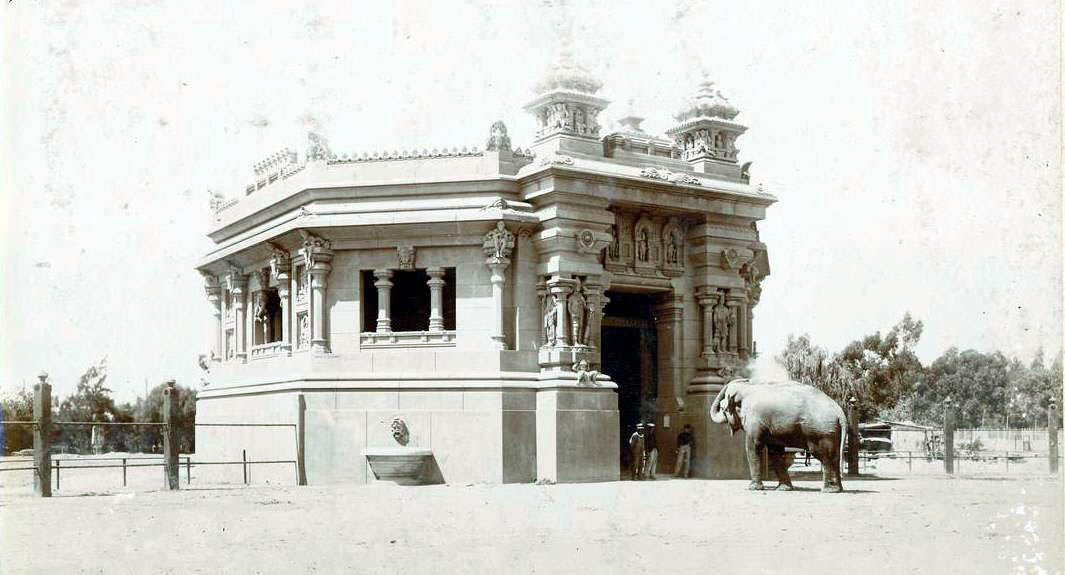
The "Palace of the Elephants", inspired by a Hindu temple architecture, as seen in 1904.

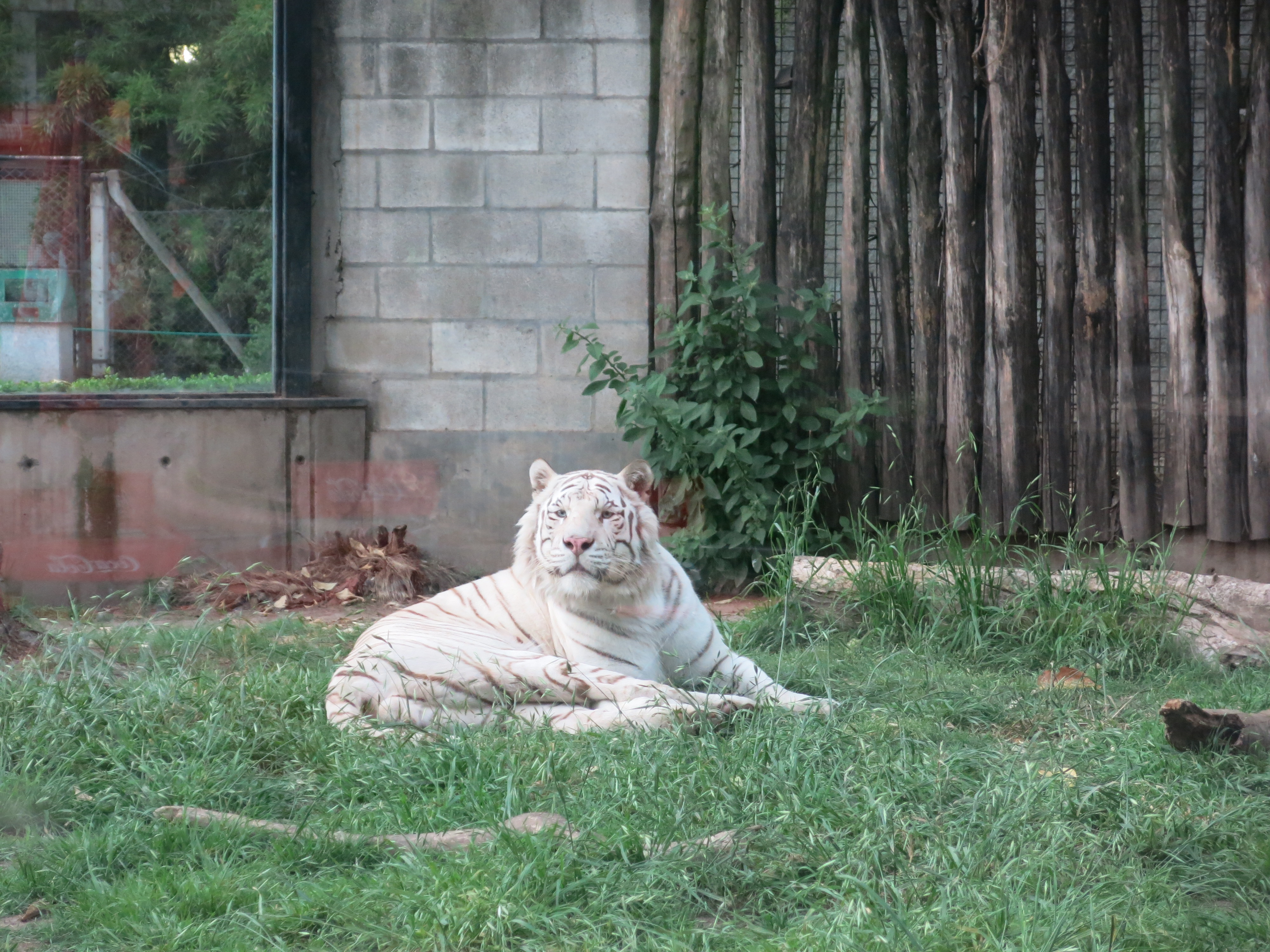
A white tiger at the Buenos Aires Zoo in 2016.

The grassy areas of the park are full of native birds and rodents, which came to the zoo for the food thrown to the animals by visitors. Nutria, rabbits, and peacock roam the park's grounds freely. A variety of monkeys and small mammals inhabited the zoo. Although some were in cages, others are located on the islands in the zoo's many ponds, or roam free.

At the Farm of the Zoo (La Granja Del Zoo), visitors used to pet and feed ponies, donkeys, sheep, and goats. This part of the zoo was also home to turkeys, chickens, roosters, pigs, rabbits, cows, and horses.

At the Aquarium, visitors could see many penguins, as well as fresh water fish including piranha and sea dwellers such as striped bream, grouper, black sea bass, sea catfish, and many tropical fish. The aquarium also had a seal and sea lion encounter.

The Reptile house was home to most of the zoo's reptiles.

The Tropical Rainforest did not house many animals. It was a two-story building displaying tropical plant life and contained an indoor waterfall. A large iguana was kept on the grounds outside the exit from this exhibit.

Big cats at the zoo included white tigers, pumas, cheetahs, jaguars, and lions. The lions were housed in a castle complex with its own moat. Four white tiger cubs, two males and two females, recently born (January 14, 2013) from Cleo a Bengal white tiger, were on display at the zoo for the public to visit until the zoo's closure.

Other animals at the zoo included red panda, camels, llamas, giraffes, bison, hippos, and elephants. Camels were exhibited amidst Moroccan-style architecture. The flamingoes were in a lake near the entrance near Byzantine "ruins" and kangaroos were surrounded by aboriginal paintings. The elephant house was built to look like the ruins of an Indian temple.

== Gallery ==
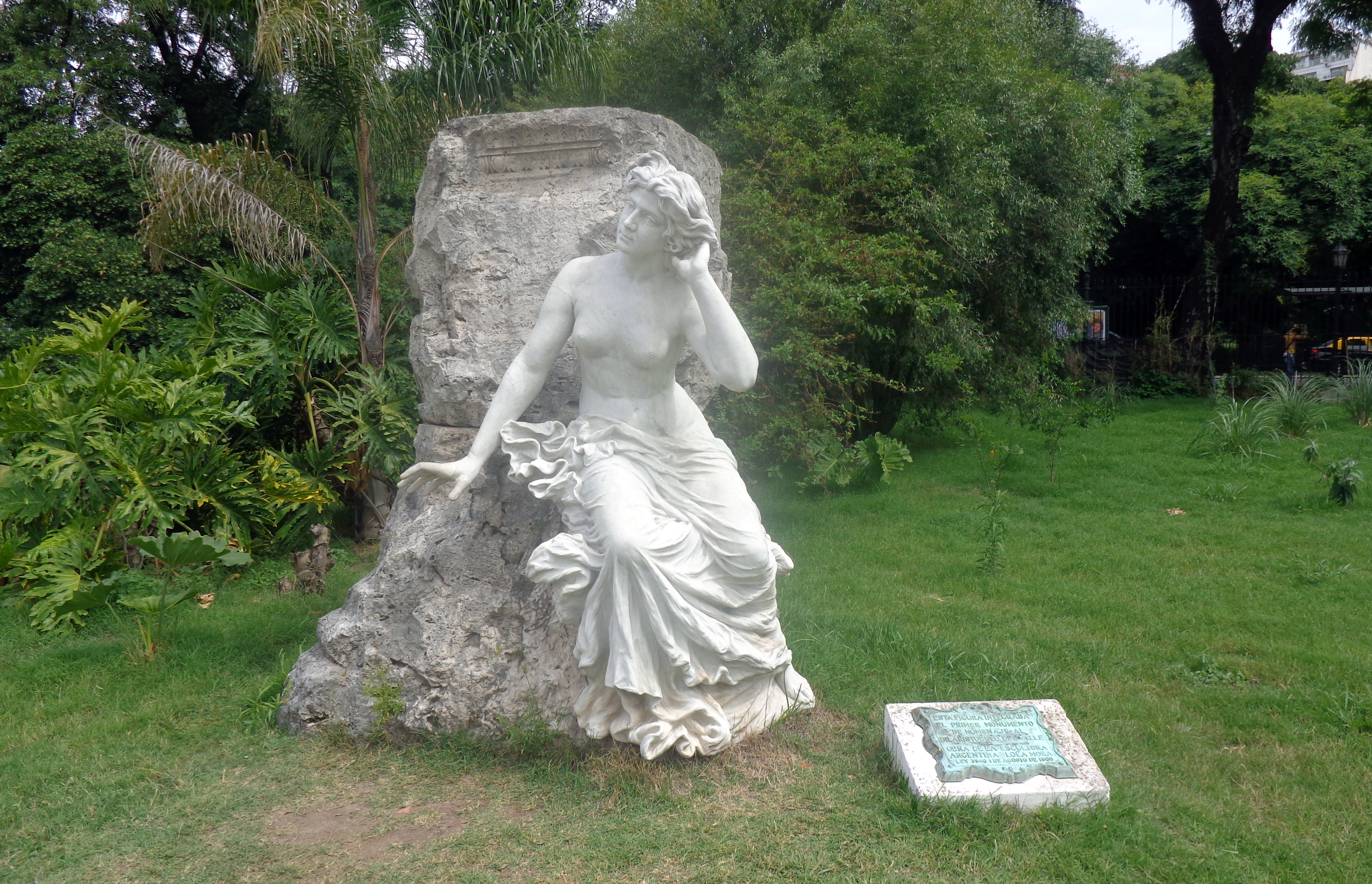
El Eco by Lola Mora

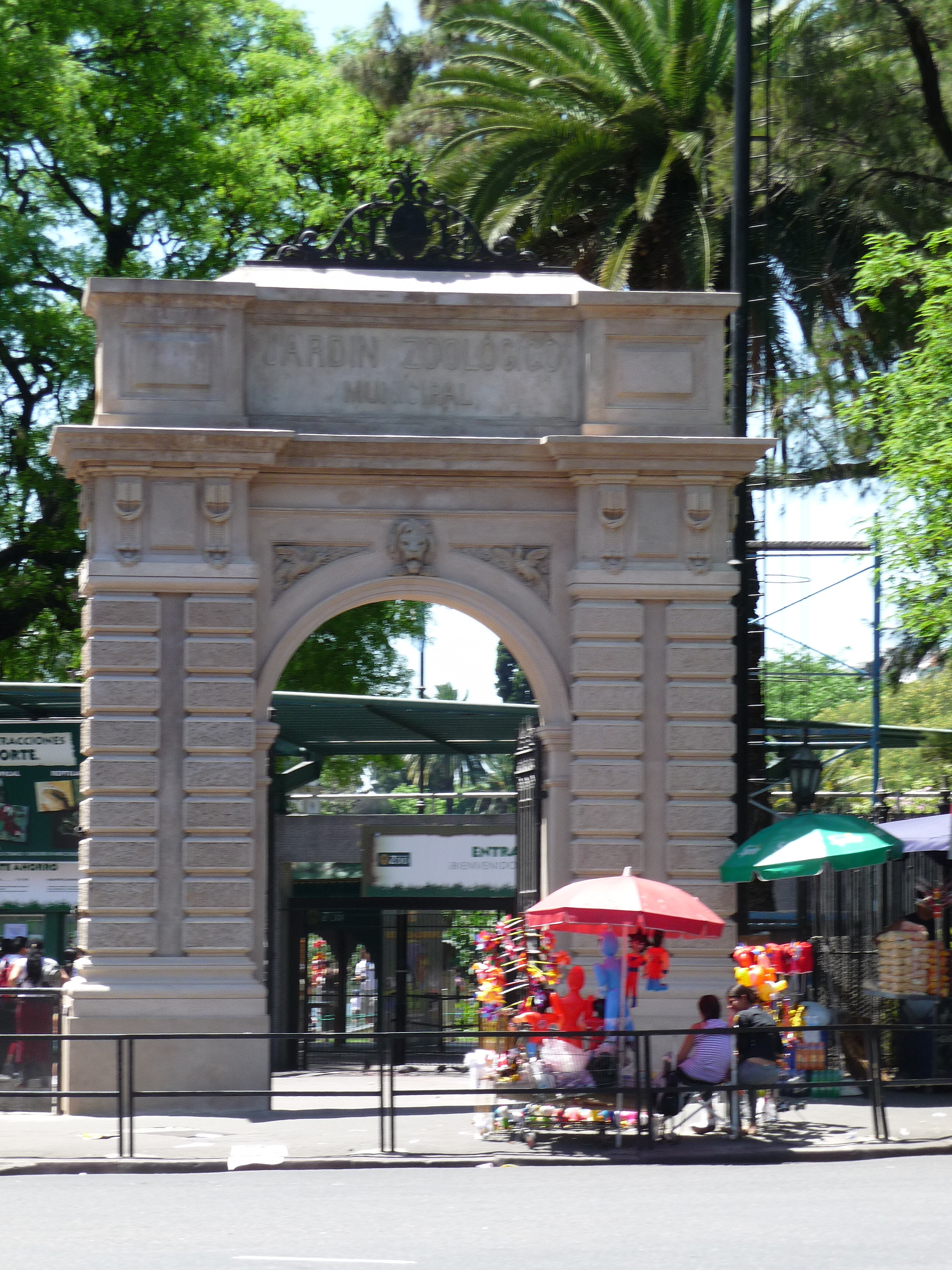
Arc on Las Heras Avenue

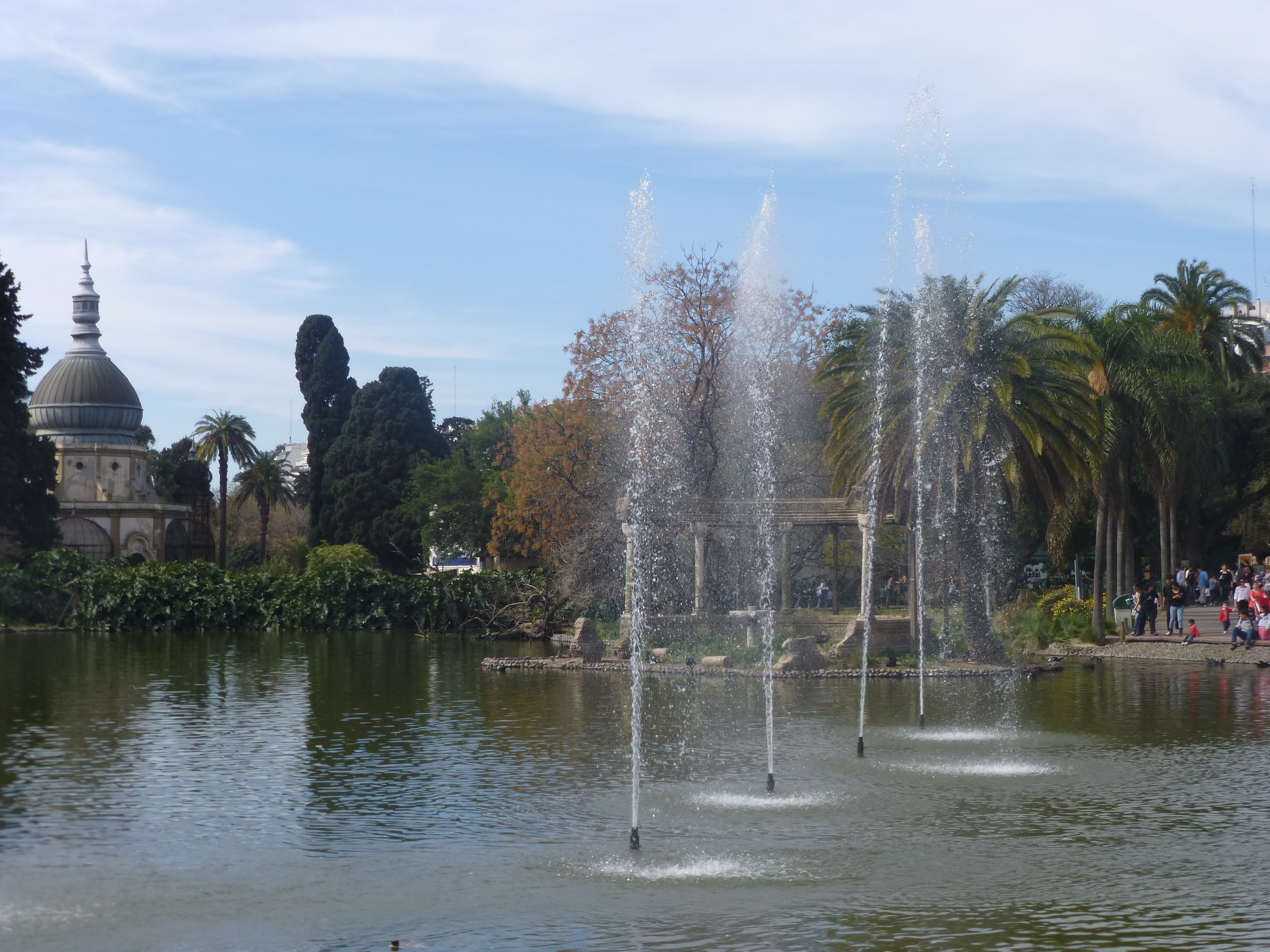
Swan Lake

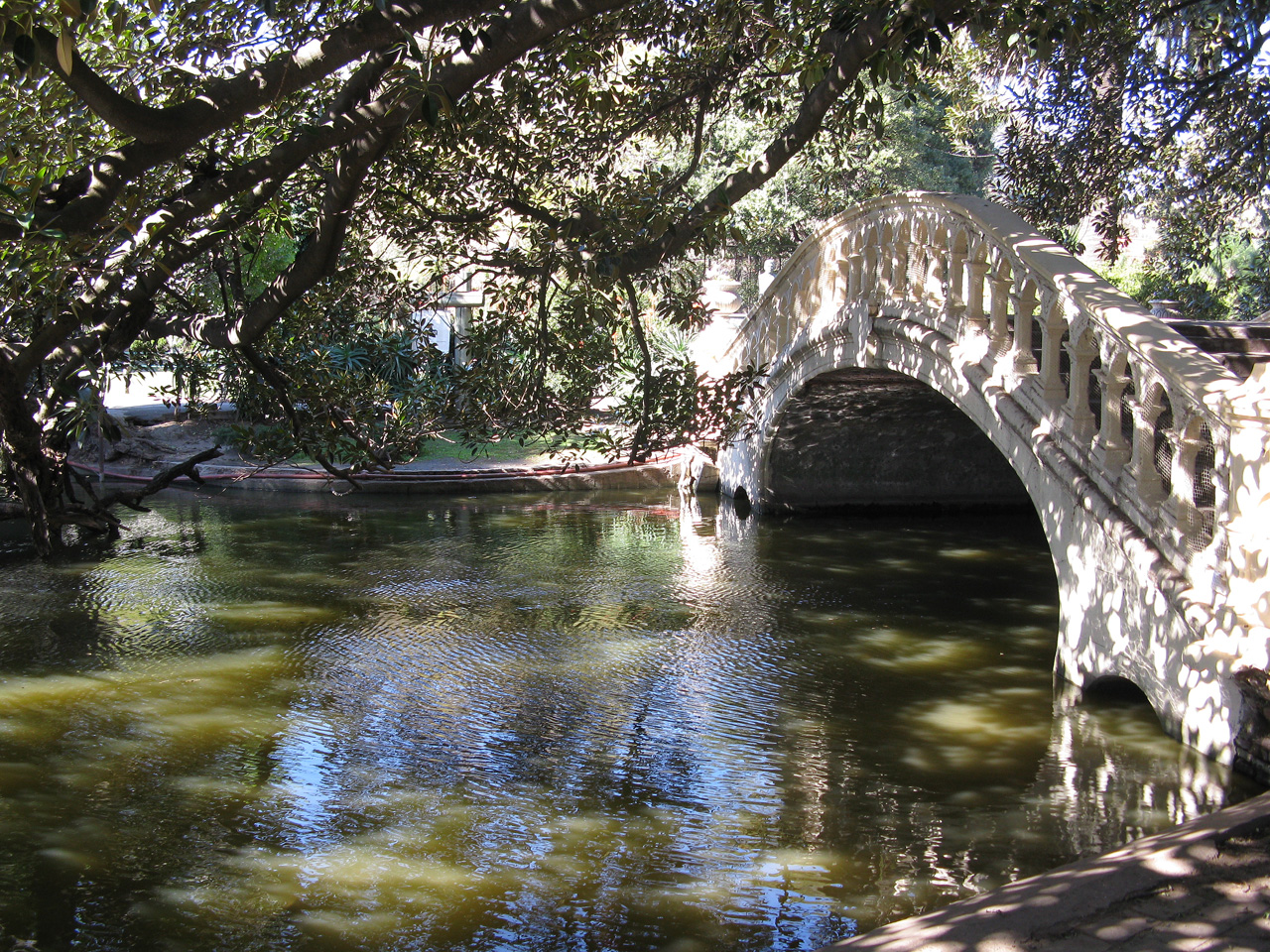
Bridge

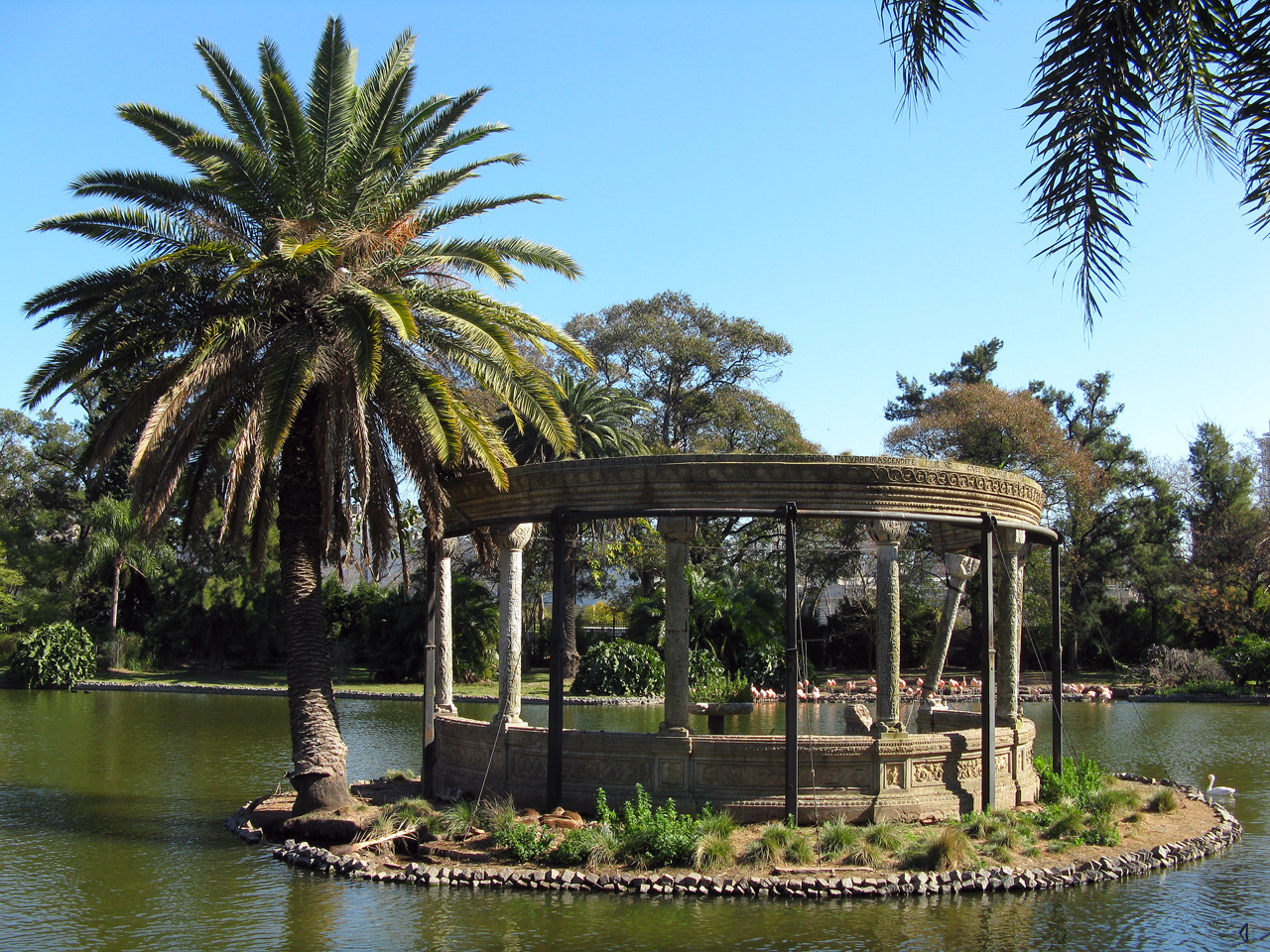
Byzantine ruins brought from Trieste

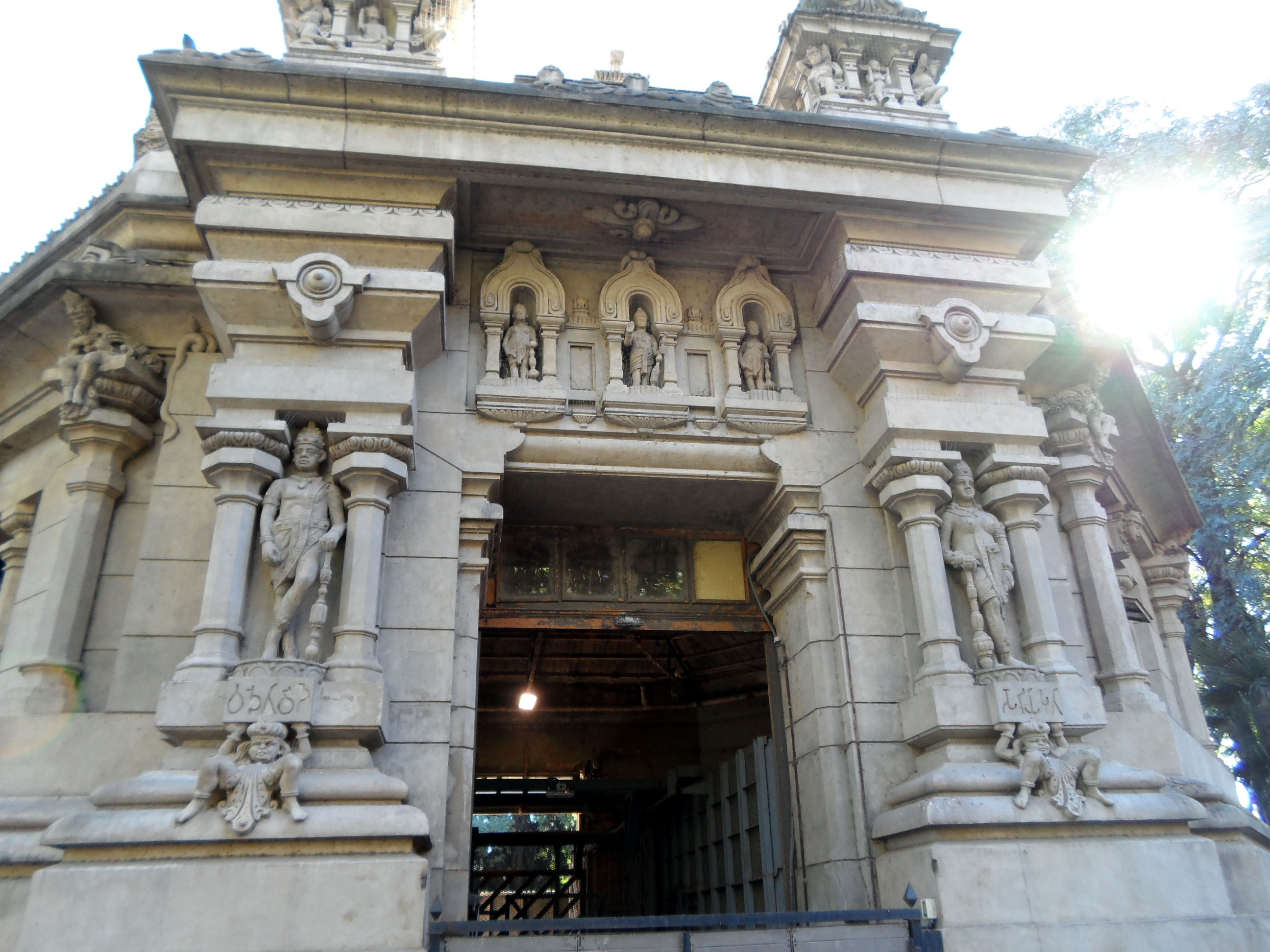
Palace of the Elephants

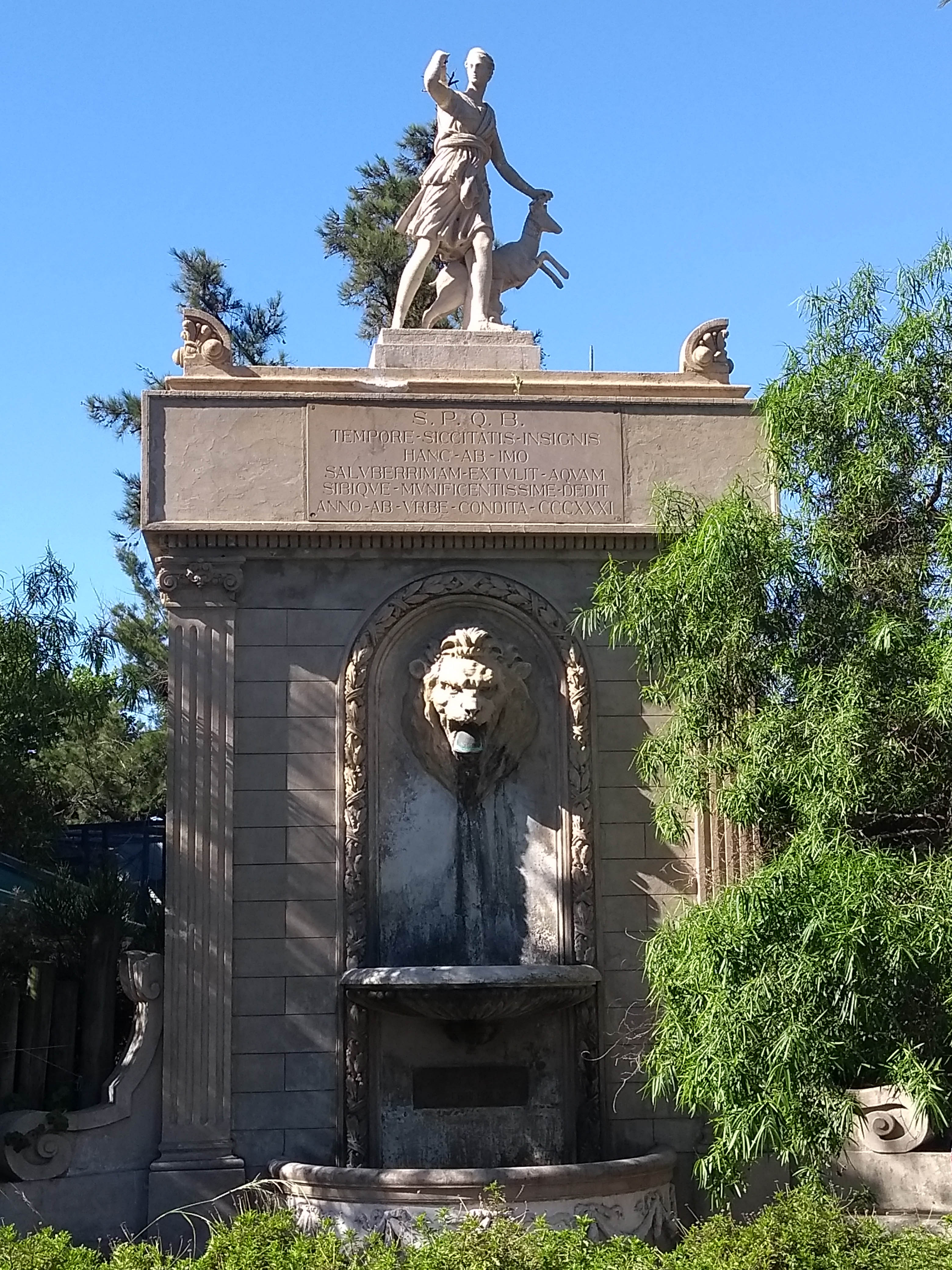
Fuente Anchorena

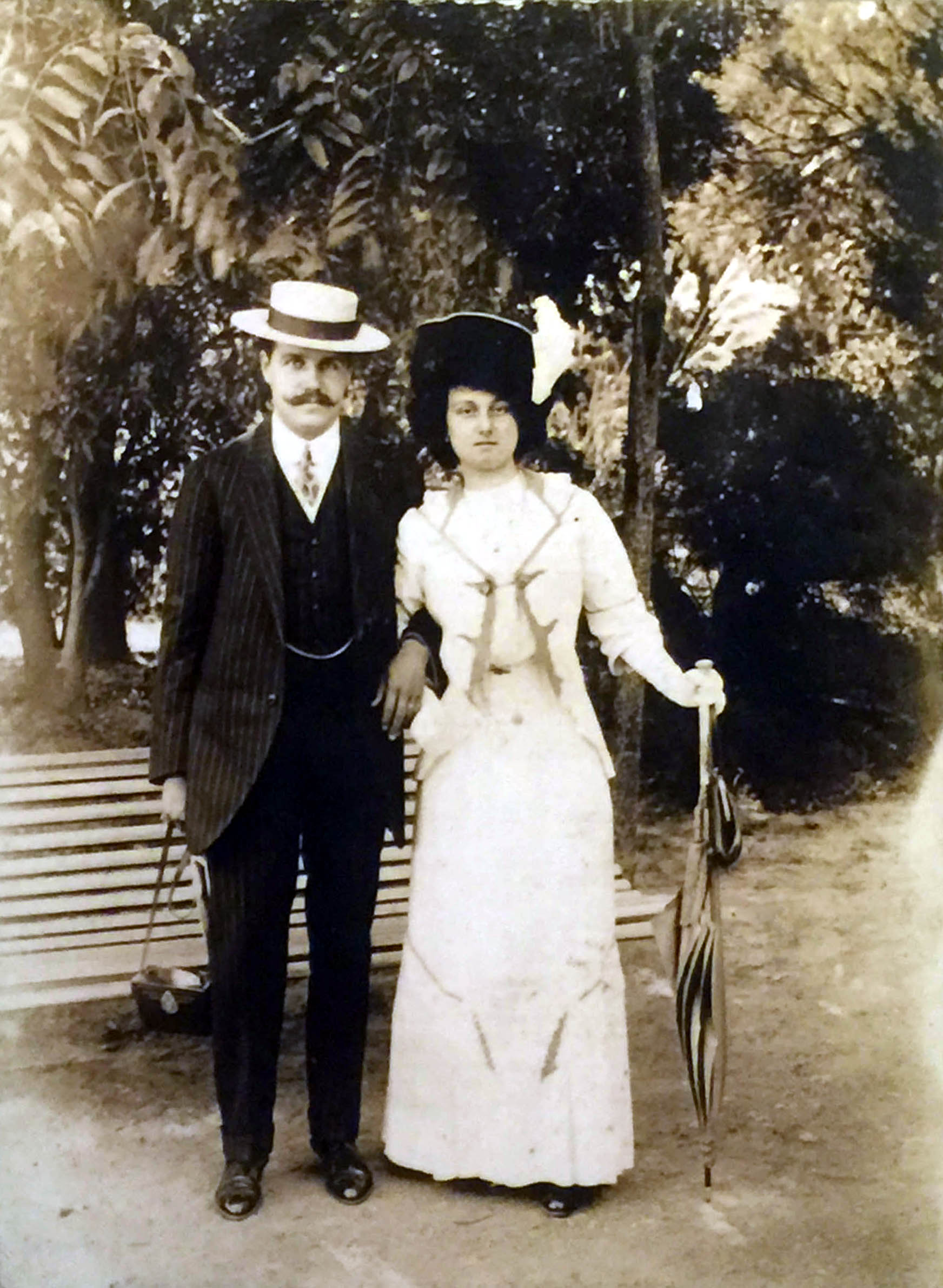
A couple at the zoo in 1911

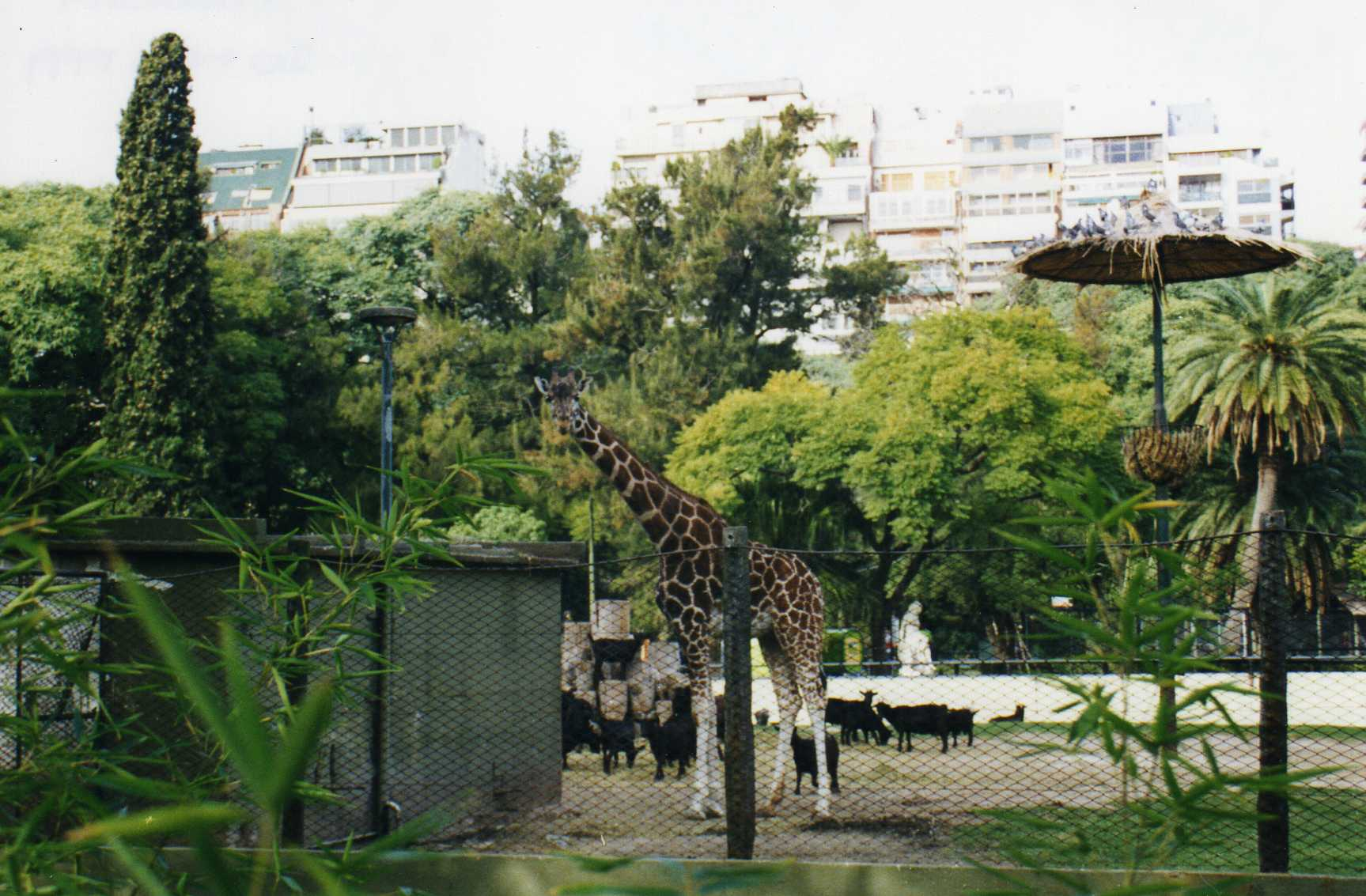
Giraffe

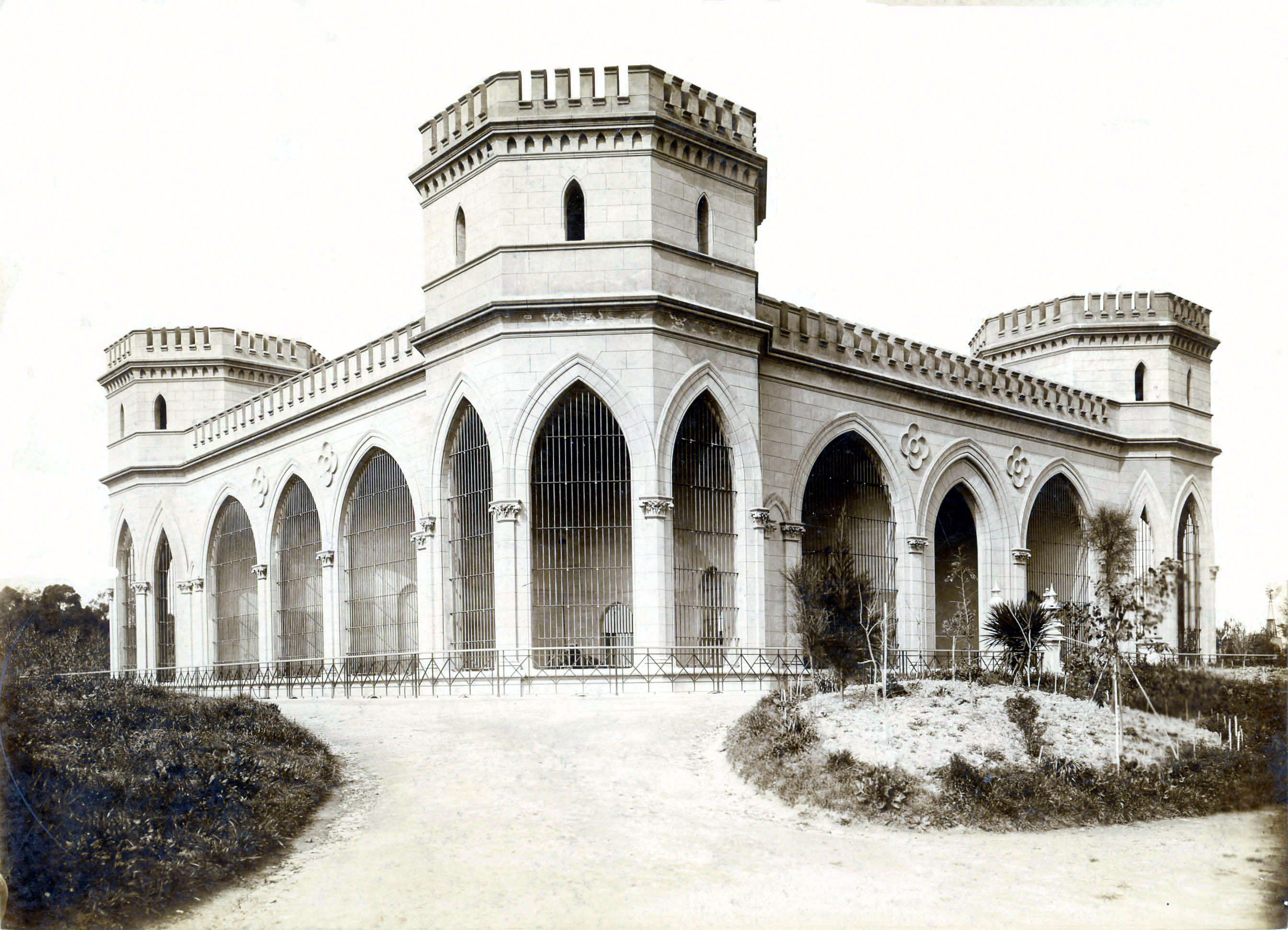
Bears House

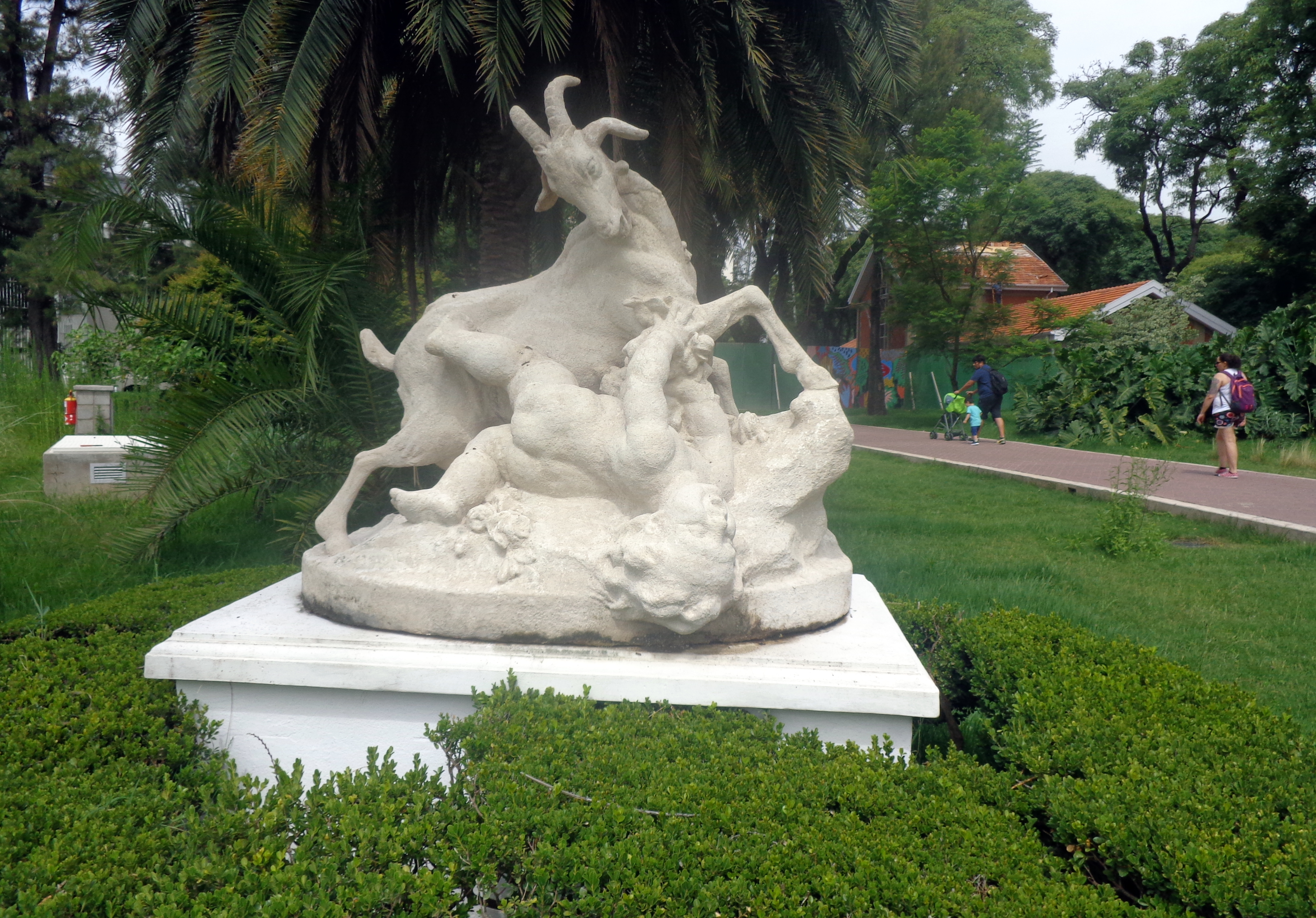
Sculpture by André-César Vermare

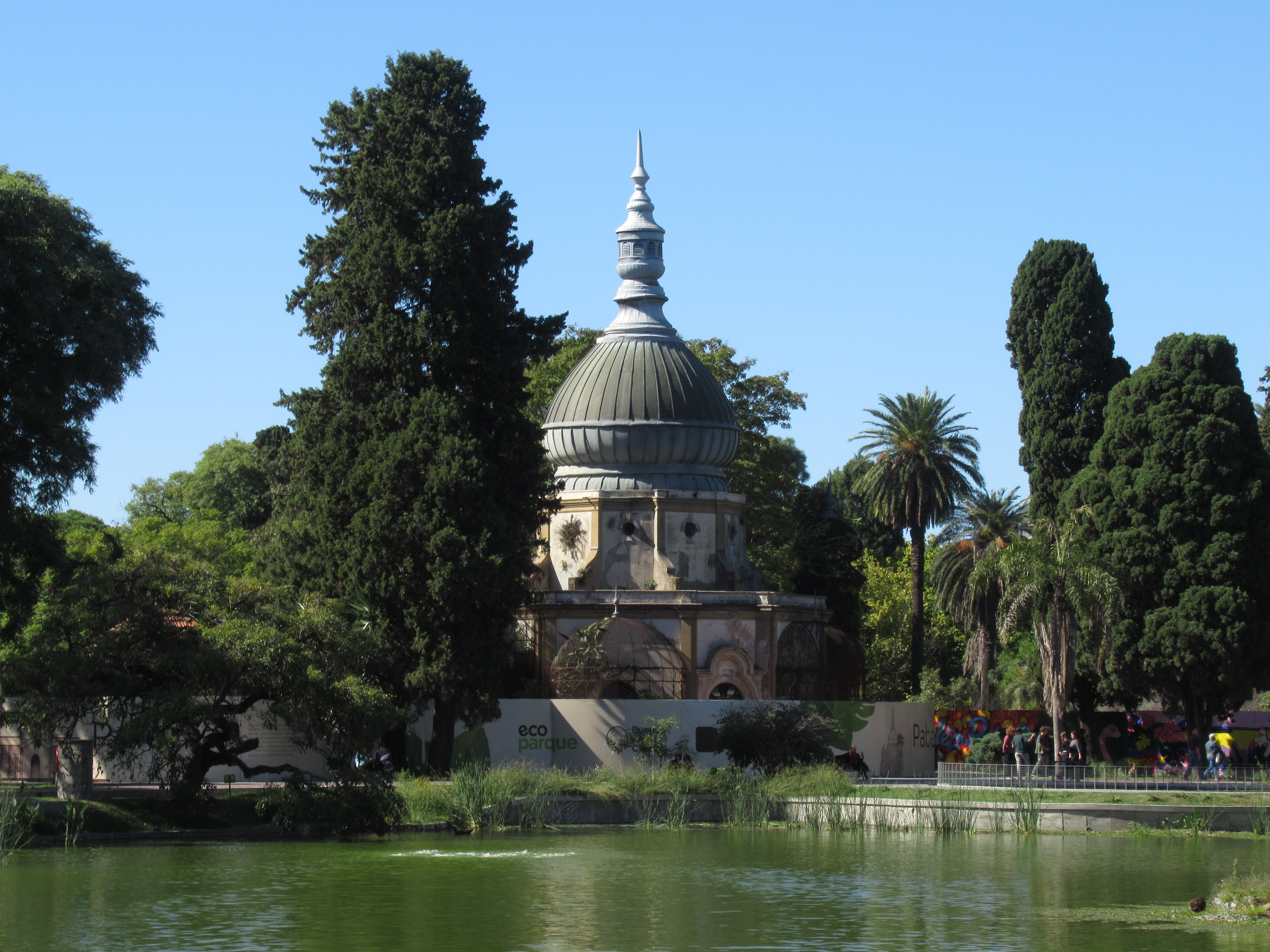
Parrots pavilion
