= The Wild Boy =

2001 novel by Warren Rochelle

- First edition cover
- Author: Warren Rochelle
- Language: English
- Publisher: Golden Gryphon Press
- Publication date: 2001
- ISBN: 1-930846-04-5 (first edition, hardcover)
- Dewey Decimal: 813.6
- LC Class: PS3618.O34 W5

The Wild Boy is a science fiction novel by Warren Rochelle. It was published in 2001 by Golden Gryphon Press. The story concerns a race of extraterrestrials who land on Earth in order to genetically engineer humanity to be their pets.

== Plot overview ==
The Lindauzi - a bearlike alien species bred to bond empathically with another species - find themselves adrift when their symbiont species, the Iani, are wiped out by a plague. Seeking another species with which to bond, the Lindauzi settle on Earth, domesticating and breeding humankind to fill the void left by the Iani. With their culture coming apart at the seams, and extinction from feral reversion threatening their species, the Lindauzi believe they have finally found success and salvation in Ilox, a human boy with great emotional sensitivity. As Ilox's bond with his Lindauzi bond-mate Phlarx grows, however, so does his curiosity regarding the history of humanity, and the answers he seeks lead to his expulsion from, and the downfall of, Lindauzi society.

== Plot summary ==
The novel switches among several different timelines which ultimately tie together in the last few chapters.

As the novel opens, the Lindauzi are reeling from the extinction of their soul-mate species, the Iani, without whom they will lose all sense of themselves and succumb to "reversion," a return to a feral, animal state. Many Lindauzi are choosing suicide over the possibility of reversion; a civil war has erupted between those who believe it is time for the Lindauzi to surrender to extinction, and those who wish to leave the homeworld in search of a compatible species to replicate the bond the Lindauzi had enjoyed with the Iani.

Corviax, son of the Left Emperor, finally wins the right to lead a search expedition; they discover that the humans of Earth share many similarities to the Iani and, believing that the Iani emotional bond with the Lindauzi can be recreated in the humans, Corviax instigates an ambitious scheme to make the human population more receptive to the Lindauzi. He begins by covertly releasing viruses to thin the planet's population, and his fleet endears itself to the sick and traumatized survivors by arriving with a cure for the virus, seemingly by pure coincidence. Once a bond of trust has been established, the Lindauzi begin building settlements and inviting humans to live with them. Further dependence is fostered in the humans by the systematic decimation of the humans' companion animals, such as dogs and cats, by more viruses. Within three or four generations, humanity is completely dependent upon and subservient to the Lindauzi, who have begun their breeding program in earnest.

Ilox is the pinnacle of the breeding program, an exceptionally bright and empathic human boy who at an early age can sense the presence and emotions of nearby Lindauzi. He becomes the pet of Phlarx, a young Lindauzi noble, and the two form a deep bond - "heart to heart, mind to mind, soul to soul," as is the stated goal of the breeding program. Despite his attachment to Phlarx, Ilox is insatiably curious, especially about human history. "Dogs" - as humans are now called by the Lindauzi - are forbidden from acquiring this knowledge, but Ilox eventually learns of the origins of the Lindauzi, the extinction of the Iani, and the lengths to which the Lindauzi went to engineer humanity to their specifications. At the same time he comes by this knowledge, Ilox falls in love with another pet human, Nivere, and is caught having sex with her. Nivere is euthanized, and Ilox - formerly seen as the Lindauzi hope for a new partner species - is now thought to be a failed breeding experiment of no use to the Lindauzi. He is separated from Phlarx and abandoned in the wild to fend for himself or die; his disappearance is written off as an accidental death.

Ilox is taken in by a small tribe of "wolves" - humans who have resisted domestication by the Lindauzi and live apart from them, hiding in the ruins of human cities. Ilox eventually adapts to life among the free humans in the settlement of Jackson, and takes a wife, Mary, with whom he has two sons, Caleb and Davy.

Despite his new life as a "wolf," Ilox misses Phlarx dearly, and one day when Caleb is eleven, Ilox leaves the human settlement to return to his Lindauzi bondmate. Not long after this, the settlement falls under siege by Lindauzi "hounds," humans bred to hunt and kill "wolves." Caleb, the only survivor of the raid, wanders on his own for a time until he is discovered and brought before Prince Orfassian, son of the late Corviax. Orfassian, impressed with the fact that Caleb can speak (and specifically, curse) in the Lindauzi language, decides to keep Caleb as a novelty, and has him trained as a "show dog."

Ilox, meanwhile, has been reunited with Phlarx and tries to tell him about the indignities humanity has suffered to become the pets of the Lindauzi. He tries to explain that the symbiotic bond that existed between the Iani and the Lindauzi can never be recreated as long as humanity remains subservient to the Lindauzi, and that humans cannot be forced into loving another being, but must be allowed the choice of loving, as Ilox chose to love his wife Mary. Phlarx cannot comprehend this, however, and thinking that Ilox has been corrupted by living among wolves, has him sealed in a sensory deprivation cocoon in an attempt to correct what Phlarx sees as a flaw in Ilox's otherwise impeccable breeding. This only has the effect of driving Ilox insane, however, and while Ilox is now more dependent upon Phlarx than ever before, he is a far cry from the intelligent, capable companion Phlarx desired.

Caleb is eventually reunited with his father, who no longer recognizes him, and the pair escape from the Lindauzi city of Umium - built on the ruins of New York City - via the old city's subway system. They are intercepted by Phlarx, who is on the run from Lindauzi authorities for displaying signs of reversion and is suffering from severe guilt for what he has done to Ilox. Phlarx agrees to take Caleb and Ilox to the "Summer Country" - South America - where it is too warm for Lindauzi to settle and humans live with relatively little interference.

Prince Orfassian, upon hearing of Phlarx's supposed reversion, the escape of Ilox and Caleb, and the truth behind Ilox's supposed "death" years previously, finally realizes that the bond cannot exist in humans the way it did in the Iani, and that the Lindauzi are facing inevitable reversion and extinction. He arranges for the air filters in the forcefields surrounding the Lindauzi cities to be altered so that carbon monoxide emissions will slowly reach lethal levels, leading to a peaceful and dignified death for his species.

Caleb adapts well to life among the human population of the Summer Country, and Ilox slowly begins regaining his senses, though he never recovers them completely. He has recurring prophetic dreams about the death of all the Lindauzi, which the humans of the Summer Country decide to act on, making tentative exploratory forays beyond their safe haven in the tropics.

Phlarx does not fare as well as the humans, however; he suffers in the tropical heat, and this, combined with his compromised bond with Ilox, leads to his death within a few months. Ilox dies along with him, and the pair are buried side by side - Ilox on the boundary of the sanctified ground of the village cemetery, and Phlarx just beyond it.

== Species ==
- Lindauzi: masc. Lindauzu, fem. Lindauza. A genetically engineered, sapient species who require an empathic bond with another compatible species to survive; left unbonded, they will eventually succumb to a total loss of sentience, known as reversion. This is apparently regarded as a fate worse than death, as many Lindauzi chose suicide over possible reversion after the extinction of the Iani. Lindauzi are described as resembling a cross between a bear and a panther; they stand upright, between roughly seven and ten feet tall, and are covered with thick, shaggy fur that is said to have an unpleasant smell when wet. They have retractable claws and fangs and crests of fur on their heads which raise and lower according to mood. Lindauzi are highly intelligent and technologically advanced; they mature much more slowly than humans and seem to have longer lifespans, as well.
- Iani: the starfaring humanoid race responsible for genetically engineering the Lindauzi and granting them sapience, creating a partner race. They are described as being very thin and long-fingered, taller than humans, but less so than Lindauzi. The species was completely wiped out by disease, with the last few dying off approximately two generations before Corviax initiated the search for their replacements. They are referred to as the "star-cousins" of the human race, and it is alluded that they once visited Earth, as Corviax gleaned our planet's location from historic navigational charts.

== Main characters ==
- Ilox: a human bred and raised by the Lindauzi. He is very tall, fair-haired and pale-skinned; he has exceptional empathic abilities, and is capable of sensing the approach of Lindauzi from a considerable distance. He forms an instant and intense bond with Phlarx, the Lindauzi youngling to whom he is given as a pet.
- Phlarx: Ilox's owner, a member of a Lindauzi noble family. Blond-furred, he is rather lackadaisical and careless, and a bit simpleminded. He loves Ilox deeply, but seems to believe that Ilox's love for him is somehow compromised if Ilox has love for anyone else, including Ilox's wife Mary and sons Davy and Caleb. Grows to develop a general empathy of his own for all humans, not just Ilox, as he says he can feel the hatred the humans of the Summer Country feel towards him. Lived in mortal fear of his father Morix for much of his childhood; as an adult, took over management of his father's tobacco plantation, and was engaged to be mated to Xian, a political marriage that would tie his line to the royal family.
- Caleb: Ilox's son; he is dark-haired and -complected, but shares his father's incredible empathy. He can sense the thoughts and emotions of nonsentient animals, such as domestic dogs and mice; see the emotional "auras" of other humans; and sense the feelings of Lindauzi. Learned to speak Lindauzi from his father, a skill that ultimately saved his life after the destruction of his hometown of Jackson in a Lindauzi pogrom. Along with his brother, was disliked by most of the other residents of Jackson due to his heritage, as free humans distrust Lindauzi-bred pets. Under the ownership of Prince Orfassian, became a "performing animal," competing in shows and sporting events.
- Morix: Phlarx's father. Blond-furred like his son, he is harsh, gruff and largely unloving. Ran a tobacco plantation and had a reputation as a breeder of high-quality dogs. His bondmate was Sandron, Ilox's sire, who died at a young age, leaving Morix bereft. Was prone to vicious outbursts of temper, a trait he passed on to Phlarx. Killed himself after Prince Orfassian learned the truth about Ilox's supposed death.
- Mary: Caleb's mother, wife of Ilox. Was one of few Jacksoners able to read, a skill she imparted to Caleb. Discovered Ilox in the snow after his banishment from the Lindauzi plantation and taught him how to live among free humans. Had one stillborn child before Caleb; died giving birth to Davy.
- Davy: Caleb's four-year-old brother; died in the Lindauzi raid on Jackson.
- Aunt Sara: Mary's sister, charged with taking care of Caleb and Davy after Mary died and Ilox left Jackson; had a particularly intense dislike for Ilox and Caleb, on whom she freely took out her aggressions. Died in the Lindauzi raid on Jackson.
- Chlavash: a red-furred Lindauzi breeder in the direct employ of Prince Orfassian, personally charged with training Caleb for participation in shows and athletic events. Among the Lindauzi who opted not to take a human bondmate, he displayed surprising compassion and affection; this was largely directed only at Caleb, though, whom he still seemed to regard only as a valuable and treasured pet rather than as an equal.
- Corviax: former Crown Prince of Lindauzian, son of Left Emperor Orfassian, leader of the search fleet that discovered Earth and instigator of chain of events that led to the Lindauzi domestication of humankind. Was quite ruthless in concealing the extent of his species' involvement in the plague that decimated humanity. Died when Ilox was thirteen, at the age of about 120 years.
- Crown Prince Orfassian: son of Corviax; described as being fond of strange and novel things. Seemed to have a bit of a temper. Was the first Lindauzi to truly realize and accept that his species was headed for extinction and organized a dignified death via carbon monoxide poisoning, rather than let the Lindauzi race revert and become wild animals.
- Tyiul: Phlarx's older sister; seemed to have some genuine care and affection for her brother.
- Nivere: Tyiul's companion pet, a girl two years older than Ilox. As she and Ilox grow into adolescence they become attracted to one another and enter into a sexual relationship; additionally, she becomes Ilox's confidant as he shares with her the knowledge he gleaned about human history. When their relationship is discovered, Nivere is put to death.
- Ossit: mother of Phlarx and Tyiul, mate of Morix. As is the case with most Lindauzi, her marriage was politically motivated and - like her relationships with her children - devoid of any real affection. One of few Lindauzi who still had memories of the homeworld; opted never to take a human pet and regarded them with open distaste. Committed suicide not long after Phlarx was gifted with Ilox.

== External links and references ==
- Listing on publisher's website
- Amazon.com listing
- Review at Infinity Plus
