= Banality (sculpture series) =

Sculpture series by Jeff Koons

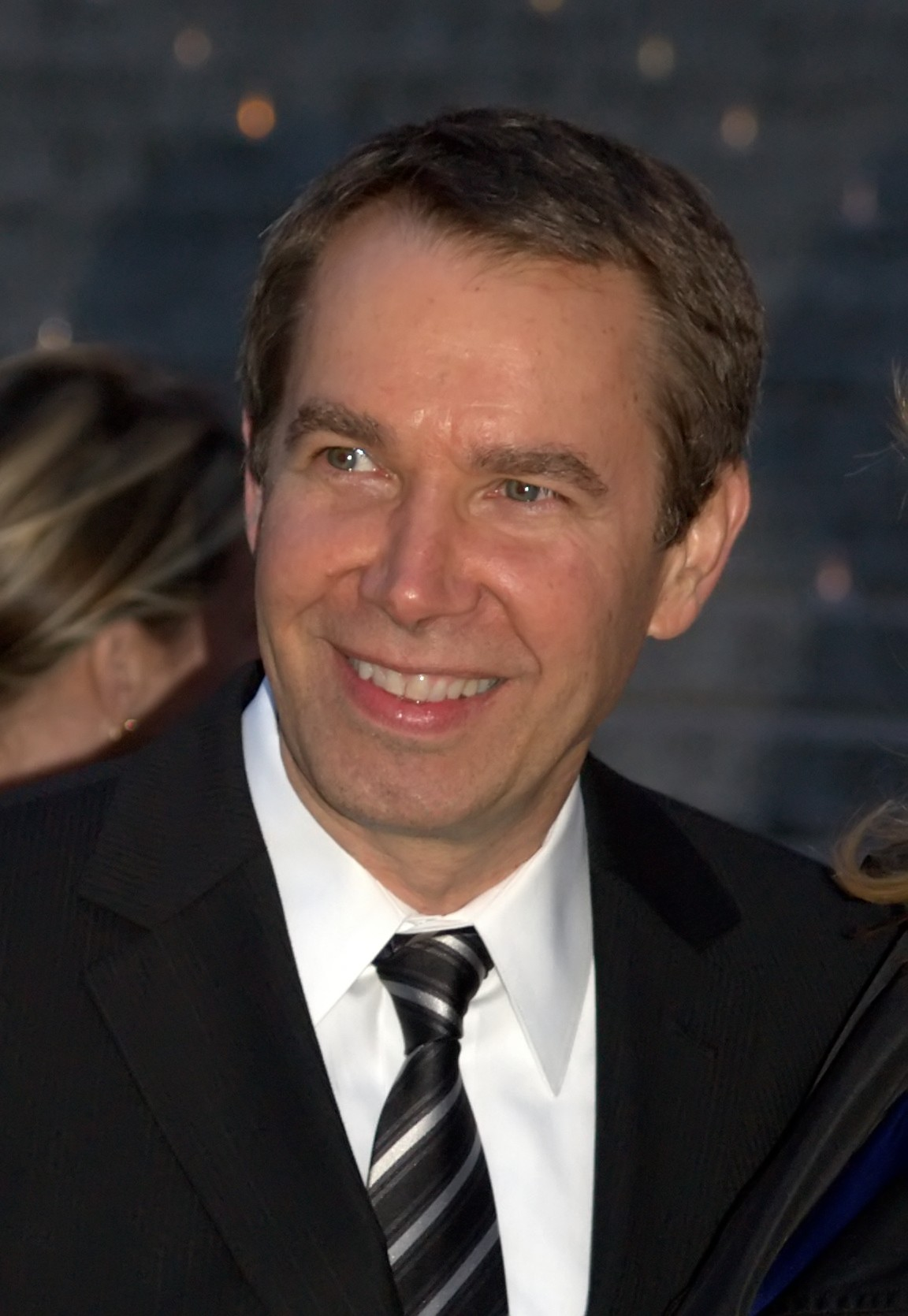
Jeff Koons in 2009

Banality is a series of sculptures by American artist Jeff Koons. The works were unveiled in 1988 and have become controversial for their use of copyrighted images. Several editions of the sculptures have sold at auction for millions of dollars.

== Series details ==
The series consists of a number of large sculptures inspired by Hummel figurines and has been described as kitsch. They were designed to convey the emotion of "lying in the grass and taking a deep breath".

When it was first unveiled, the series was simultaneously on show at three different galleries - at the Sonnabend Gallery in New York City, at the Donald Young Gallery in Chicago and at the Galerie Max Hetzler in Cologne - possible because several editions of each sculpture were made. Koons promoted his works by taking out four advertisements in the major trade magazines. Each of the full-page features depicted different parts of Koons' reputed persona:

1. A propagator of the banal: Koons is shown alongside two pigs - published in Flash Art
2. A bad influence on future generations: he is in a classroom full of children, a blackboard contains the slogans "Exploit the Masses" and "Banality as Savior" - published in Artforum
3. A gigolo: he is standing in front of a boudoir-style tent - published in Flash Art
4. A ladies man: he is with a Shetland pony and several women in bikinis - published in Arts Magazine and Art in America

The advertisements were the first time that Koons was featured in his own work, exploiting the reputation that the media and his critics had propagated.

== Controversy ==
Several sculptures from the series have been adjudged to have broken copyright laws. Koons has defended his works on numerous occasions but the courts have repeatedly rejected his claims of fair use by parody.

== Constituent sculptures ==
Most of the sculptures are made of porcelain; three editions of each were produced in addition to the artist's proof. The most notable pieces are detailed below.

=== Bear and Policeman ===
Banality
- Medium: Polychromed wood
- Dimensions: 215.9 cm × 109.2 cm × 94 cm (85 in × 43 in × 37 in)

A smiling brown bear wearing a striped T-shirt has his arm around a shorter policeman who is looking up at the animal.

"The relatively diminutive constable, a symbol of authority, contrasts comically with the bear's monstrous size and relative harmlessness. Looking helplessly up at the bear, the expression on the policeman's face holds the key to enjoying Koons' work: a temporary suspension of adulthood, a return to seeing the world through a child's perspective. Koons seems to hint that the adult world, with its explicit content, greed and shame, is worth staving off."

— Angelina Krahn, Art writer for Express Milwaukee

=== Fait d'Hiver ===
Banality
- Medium: Porcelain
- Dimensions: 49.5 cm × 160 cm × 80 cm (19.5 in × 63 in × 31.5 in)

Fait d'Hiver depicts a woman lying on her back in the snow. The upper torso and head of the woman are featured in the sculpture, her breasts exposed beneath a sparsely-knitted dress. A pig and two penguins stand near to her head, adding the kitsch element that is thematic throughout the collection. The catalogue colourfully described the work as a "Walt Disney version of an erotic fantasy ... juxtaposing a strong sexual element with the saccharine sweetness of decorative knicknacks". It went on to say that the "disturbing combination identifies a primal hunger at the heart of American consumerism".

Koons based the design of the woman on a photograph of porn actress Ilona Staller that featured in Stern. He had not met Staller at the time but went on to have a very public relationship with her, using her as a muse for many subsequent works.

In November 2001 an edition of the sculpture was auctioned by Phillips de Pury & Company with an estimate of up to US$2.5 million but it failed to sell. Several years later, on November 13, 2007, Christie's auctioned the artist's proof with a final sale price of US$4.3 million. In 2018 a French court found that Koons' sculpture had plagiarised a 1985 advertisement for Naf Naf, a women's clothing retailer. Damages and costs were awarded against Koons but the sculpture was not seized.

=== Michael Jackson and Bubbles ===
Banality
- Medium: Porcelain
- Dimensions: 106.7 cm × 179.1 cm × 82.6 cm (42 in × 70.5 in × 32.5 in)

In 1988, Jeff Koons made three identical porcelain sculptures of Bubbles and Jackson. At the time, each sculpture was said to be worth $250,000. Koons once said of the pop star, "If I could be one other living person, it would probably be Michael Jackson." The art piece went on to become one of Koons' best known works. The figure shows Jackson and the chimpanzee wearing gold military-style suits. In 2001, one of the figures was put up for auction and was expected to fetch between $3 million and $4 million. The figure sold to an anonymous telephone bidder for $5.6 million. The sale was a record for a work by Koons.

=== Pink Panther ===
Banality
- Medium: Porcelain
- Dimensions: 104.1 cm × 52.1 cm × 48.3 cm (41 in × 20.5 in × 19 in)

Pink Panther is a 41-inch tall porcelain sculpture featuring Jayne Mansfield holding the cartoon character Pink Panther. Mansfield is sculpted from the waist up and is partly clothed, her breasts being exposed; her right hand covers her nearly-exposed breast. The Pink Panther is shown in full, his chin over the left shoulder of Mansfield. Robert Storr, curator of the Department of Painting and Sculpture at the Museum of Modern Art, commented on the piece: "His mating of Jayne Mansfield and the eponymous cartoon character in Pink Panther is a thoroughly enjoyable send-up of heterosexual rapture and celebrity romance." Koons' himself states that the piece was intended to represent the Pink Panther as a female masturbation aid. His depiction of the character caused legal issues and Koons was sued for copyright infringement, eventually settling out of court.

One edition of Pink Panther was sold at Sotheby's in May 2011 with a complementary description in the catalogue entry:

"Representing the highest tier of Jeff Koons' artistic achievement, Pink Panther is immediately identifiable as a masterpiece not only of the artist's historic canon, but also of the epoch of recent Contemporary Art. It conflates the classic themes that define the artist's output—materiality and artificiality, eroticism and naivety, popular culture and rarefied elitism—and is the model expression of one of the most innovative and influential artists of our times."

— Sotheby's catalogue entry about Pink Panther

On May 10, 2011, it sold significantly below the US$20–30 million expected price, reaching US$16,882,500.

=== Saint John the Baptist ===
Banality
- Medium: Porcelain
- Dimensions: 142.2 cm × 73.7 cm × 43.2 cm (56 in × 29 in × 17 in)

Inspired by Leonardo da Vinci's painting, St. John the Baptist, Koons' sculpture was made in the same pose but he also added a pig and a bird into the saint's arms. His outstretched arm points to a cross. It has been described as "an insouciant yet sinister conflation of the sacred and the profane".

One edition of the sculpture was set to go on show at the Wright Exhibition Space in Seattle in February 2004, but it was discovered to have a sizeable crack along the arm. Bought in 1991 for US$150,000, the damage is expected to have reduced the resale price of the piece, though none of the editions have been sold at auction since. Patricia Leavengood, a sculpture conservation specialist, partly restored the damage and reduced the visibility of the crack. She noted, however, that "When it cracked, part of it slid forward and can't be moved back into place ... Porcelain wasn't meant to exist at this size. My primary task is to stabilize the piece, and that I can do."

=== String of Puppies ===
Banality
- Medium: Porcelain
- Dimensions: 106.7 cm × 157.5 cm × 94 cm (42 in × 62 in × 37 in)

String of Puppies is a porcelain sculpture depicting a man and a woman sat on a bench holding eight blue puppies. The inspiration came from a photograph by Art Rogers entitled Puppies. Koons found the picture on a postcard and, when he gave it to his assistants with instructions on how to model the sculpture, he asked that as much detail be copied as possible. He requested a few changes to the original, asking for the puppies to be blue with exaggerated noses, and for flowers to be added to the hair of the man and woman. The three editions of the sculpture were sold for a total of $367,000.

Upon discovering that his picture had been copied, Rogers sued Koons and the Sonnabend Gallery for copyright infringement. Koons admitted to having copied the image intentionally and, in 1992, the court found "substantial similarity" between the two works and that Koons acted in a "willful and egregious" manner. They rejected his parody argument and awarded a significant settlement to Rogers.

=== Ushering in Banality ===
Banality
- Medium: Polychromed wood
- Dimensions: 96.5 cm × 157.5 cm × 76.2 cm (38 in × 62 in × 30 in)

A pig with a green ribbon is being pushed by two young angels (alongside it) with a young boy dressed in a tracksuit behind it. Ushering in Banality was ruled to have "deliberately and exactly copied" a photograph by Barbara Campbell. Koons had instructed his Italian studio to replicate Campbell's Boys with Pig using it as a model for the design.

At a Sotheby's auction in November 2001 one of the three editions of Ushering in Banality sold for US$1,875,750.

=== Wild Boy and Puppy ===
Banality
- Medium: Porcelain
- Dimensions: 96.5 cm × 100.3 cm × 59.7 cm (38 in × 39.5 in × 23.5 in)

Wild Boy and Puppy is a porcelain sculpture featuring a yellow cartoon dog, a "wild boy" with red spiky hair, and a bumblebee in a basket. The cartoon dog is a clear replica of Odie from the Garfield comic strip by Jim Davis with only minimal changes. In 1993, United Feature Syndicate, Inc. sued Koons for his unsanctioned use of Odie, successfully arguing that he had breached copyright law. Koons had defended himself in other cases using the parody argument but could not do so here—he testified to being unaware of the source of the character and therefore could not have directed the parody at the comic.

One edition of the sculpture sold in November 2004 for US$1.5 million, significantly higher than its US$400,000 estimate.

== See also ==
- List of most expensive sculptures
