= Tourism in Buenos Aires =

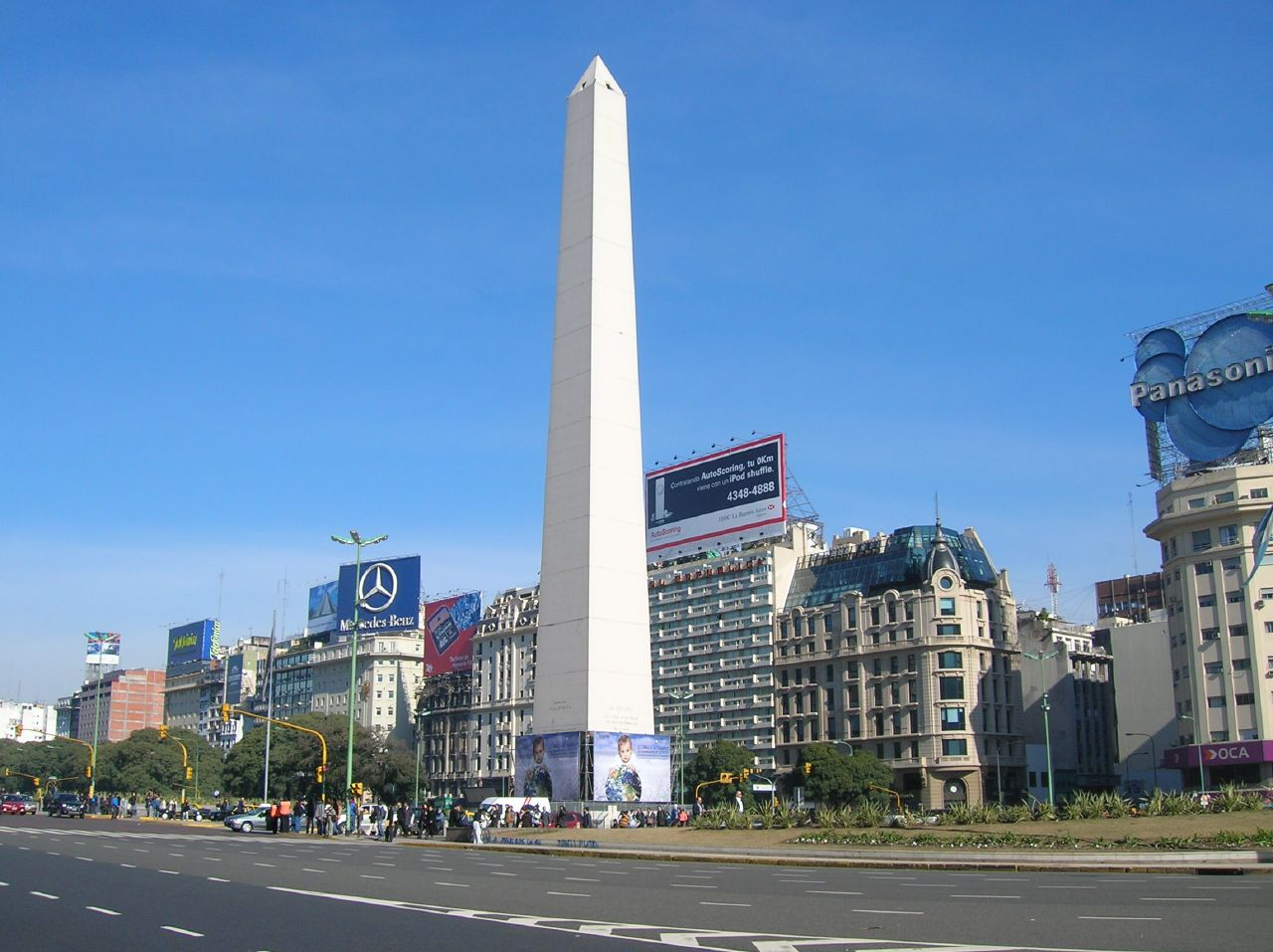
The Obelisk

Buenos Aires, regarded as the "Paris of South America", offers elegant architecture, exquisite cuisine, a legendary nightlife, and fashionable shopping. According to the World Travel & Tourism Council (WTTC) the travel and tourism sector of Argentina was moving towards recovering its pre-COVID-19 pandemic contribution to GDP in mid-2023, led by Buenos Aires.

== Tourist attractions ==
The most popular tourist sites are found in the historic core of the city, in the Montserrat and San Telmo neighborhoods. Buenos Aires was conceived around the Plaza de Mayo, the colony's administrative center. To the east of the square is the Casa Rosada, the official seat of the executive branch of the government of Argentina. To the north, the Catedral Metropolitana which has stood in the same location since colonial times, and the Banco de la Nación Argentina building, a parcel of land originally owned by Juan de Garay. Other important colonial institutions were Cabildo, to the west, which was renovated during the construction of Avenida de Mayo and Julio A. Roca. To the south is the Congreso de la Nación (National Congress), which currently houses the Academia Nacional de la Historia (National Academy of History). Lastly, to the northwest, is City Hall.

Avenida de Mayo links the Casa Rosada with the Argentine National Congress. On this avenue there are several buildings of cultural, architectural, and historical importance, such as Casa de la Cultura, the Palacio Barolo and Café Tortoni. Underneath the avenue, the first subte (metro) line in South America, opened in 1913. The avenue ends at Plaza del Congreso, which features a number of monuments and sculptures, including one of few surviving original casts of Auguste Rodin's "The Thinker".

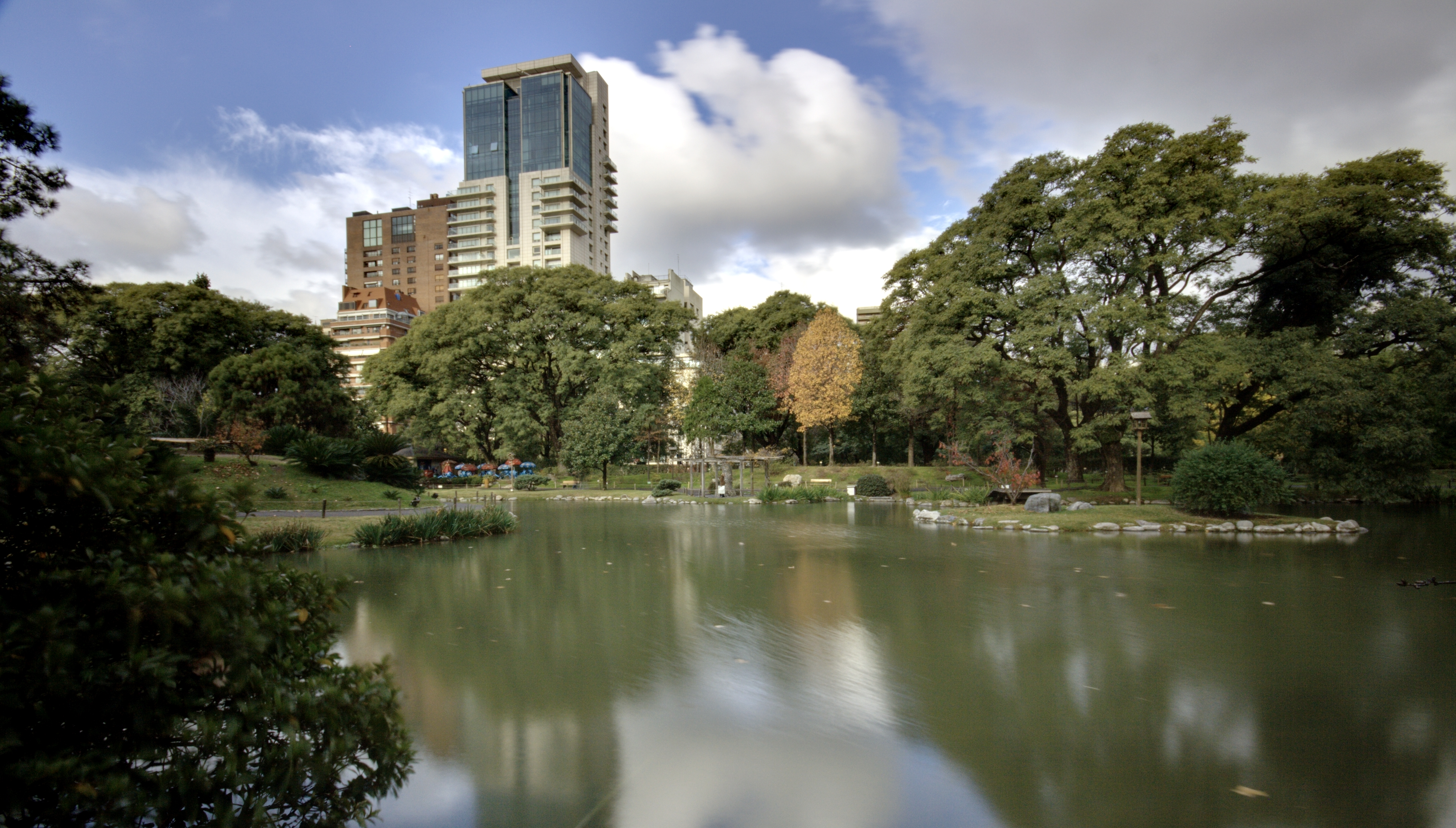
Japanese Gardens

On the Manzana de las Luces ("Illuminated Block") area are the San Ignacio church, the Colegio Nacional Buenos Aires, and the old city council building (1894 to 1931). This area has tunnels and catacombs, which crossed underneath the Plaza de Mayo during colonial times. The San Telmo neighborhood of Plaza Dorrego hosts an antiques fair on Sundays, complete with tango shows. Frequent tours and activities are available at the Church of Nuestra Señora de Bethlehem, the San Pedro Telmo Parish and the Antonio Ballvé Penitentiary Museum. The National Historical Museum in Parque Lezama is a few blocks to the south.

The borough of Recoleta is home to a number of places of interest, including the Museo Nacional de Bellas Artes, the Biblioteca Nacional, the Centro Cultural Recoleta, the Faculty of Law of the Universidad de Buenos Aires, the Basílica Nuestra Señora de Pilar, the Palais de Glace, the Café La Biela and the Cementerio de la Recoleta, where Eva Perón's crypt can be visited, among those of many other Argentine historical and cultural figures.

El Ateneo Grand Splendid, one of the city's best-known bookshops and, moved from a downtown location to Santa Fé Avenue, where "Barrio Norte" meets the borough of Palermo in a renovated former theatre, later cinema, which still shows its origins. Plaza Italia, site of a monument to Giuseppe Garibaldi, the Buenos Aires Zoo, the botanical gardens, and the Palermo woods (with paddleboat lake, rose garden, and planetarium) are all a short walk to the east of it.

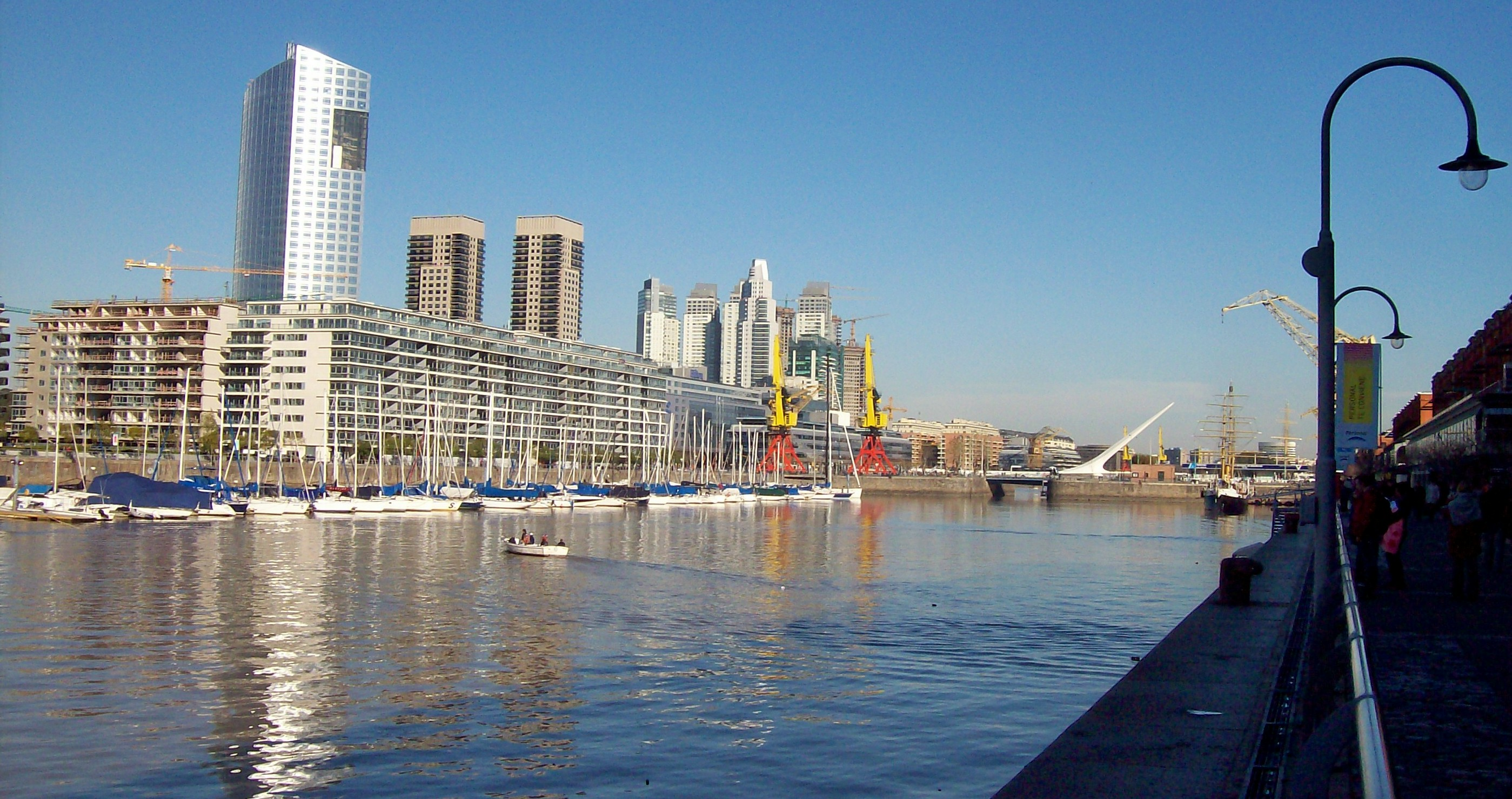
View of the Puerto Madero district

The borough of Retiro features the Retiro Railway Terminal and several other notable landmarks, including the Plaza San Martín square, its monument to the dead of the Falklands War, an equestrian statue of General San Martín and, nearby, the Torre Monumental (formerly Torre de los Ingleses) donated by the Anglo-Argentine community, the ornate Basilica Santísimo Sacramento and the Art Deco Kavanagh Building, one of the tallest in the city.

The Museo de Arte Latinoamericano de Buenos Aires is located in the barrio of Palermo, and is one of the most important in the country. In this neighbourhood can also be found the Bosques de Palermo, the Planetarium and Buenos Aires Zoo.

The southern area of the city, (including barrios such as Barracas and Parque Patricios) while traditionally not a top tourist destination, is historically the source for much of the city's early tango culture. It is now home to a burgeoning arts scene. Another important tourist site is Avenida Corrientes; among dozens of cinemas, theatres, booksellers and music shops, this avenue is home to the San Martín Cultural Center, Paseo La Plaza and the Luna Park coliseum. At the intersection of this avenue with Avenida 9 de julio, the Obelisco, the emblem of the City of Buenos Aires, is located. The Art Deco former central wholesale fruit and vegetable market, Mercado de Abasto, which became a shopping mall, is also on this avenue.

At the southwest end of the city, the Buenos Aires car racing circuit and the Parque de la ciudad amusement park, with a 200-metre-high Torre Espacial tower, are located.

Buenos Aires has been attracting a homosexual community in Latin America. Since 2006, the city has seen unprecedented numbers of gay-oriented cruise ship arrivals, an increase in the number of gay-owned businesses.

Caminito
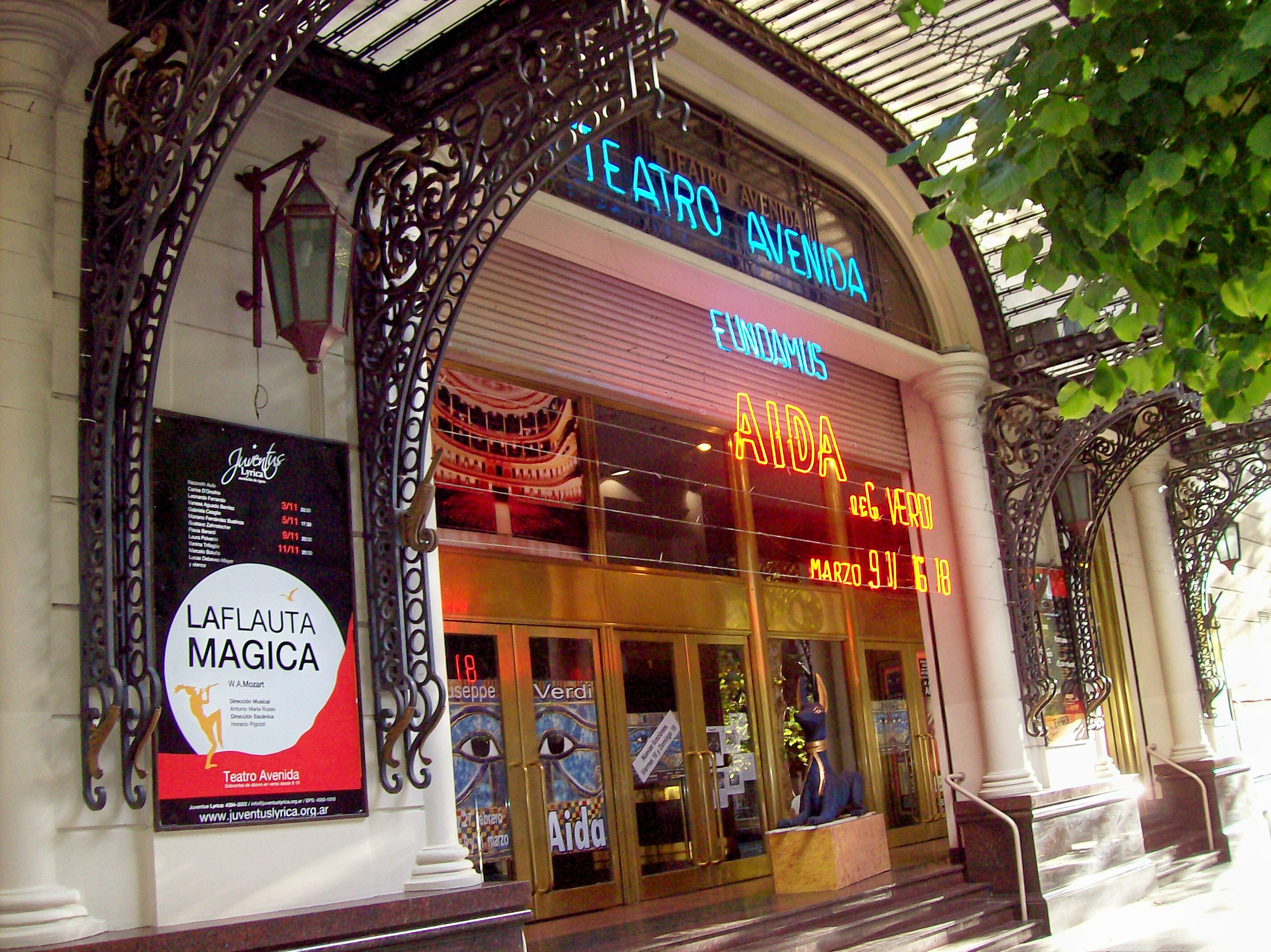
Theatre district

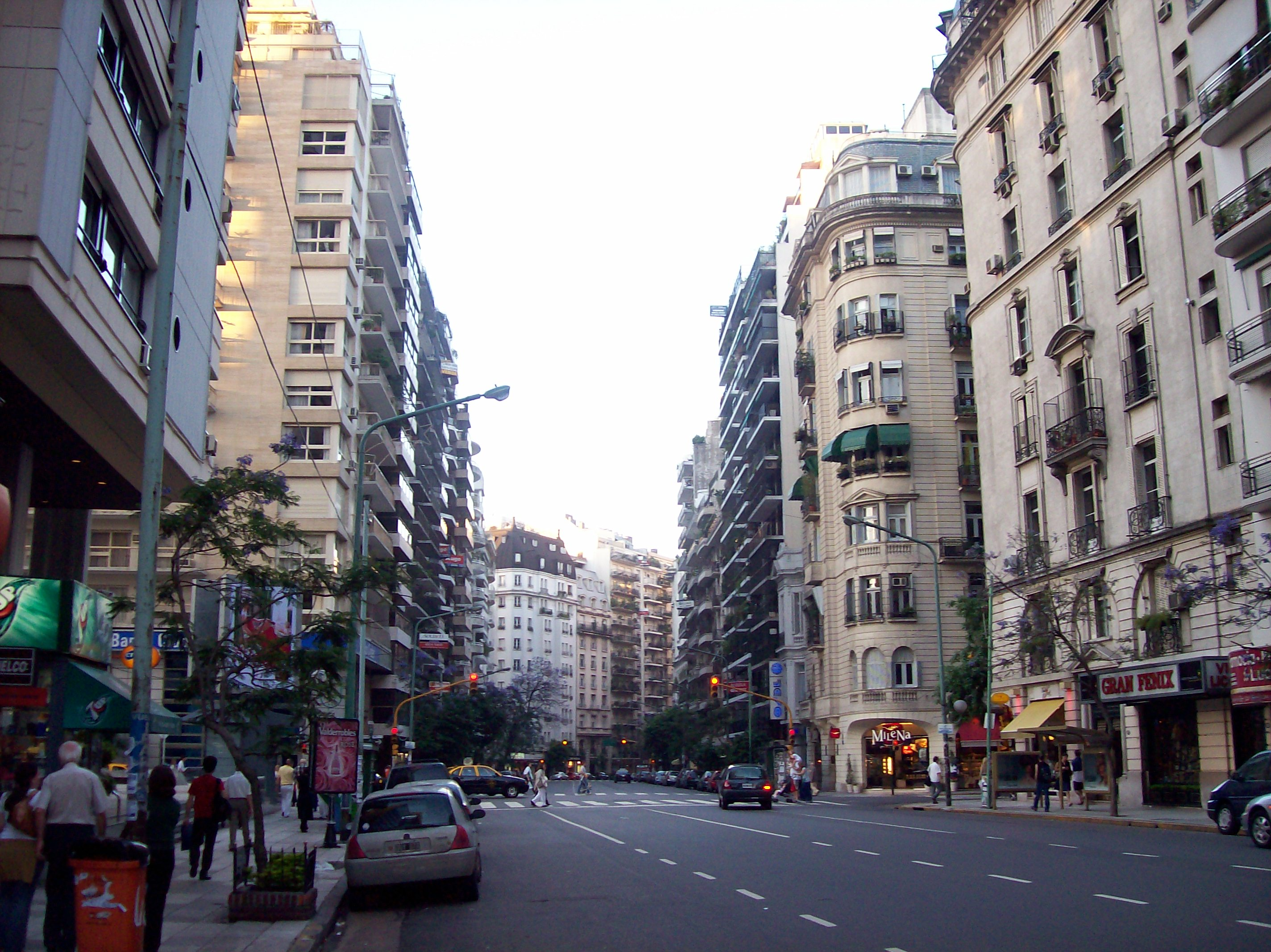
Callao Avenue (Recoleta district)

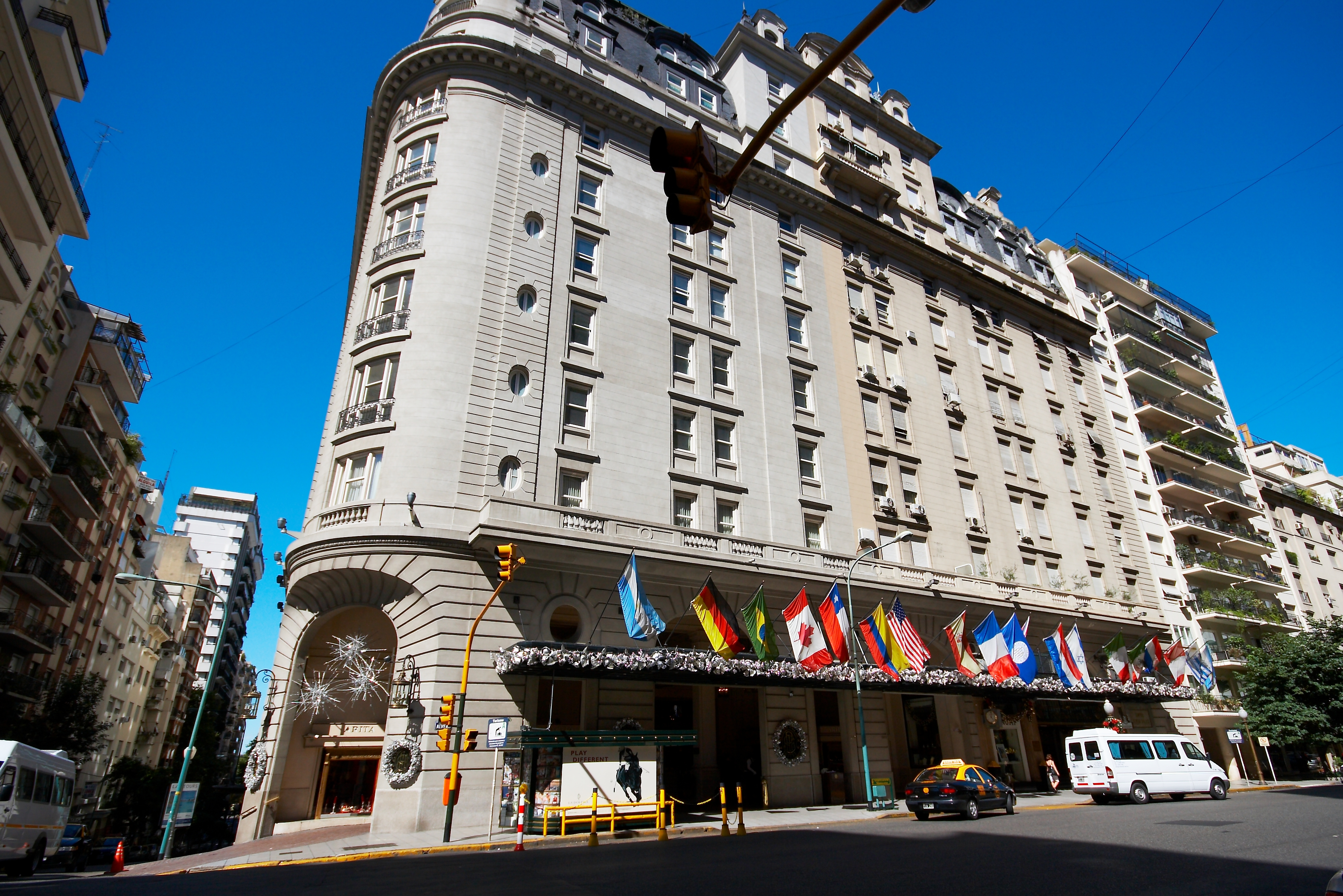
Alvear Palace Hotel

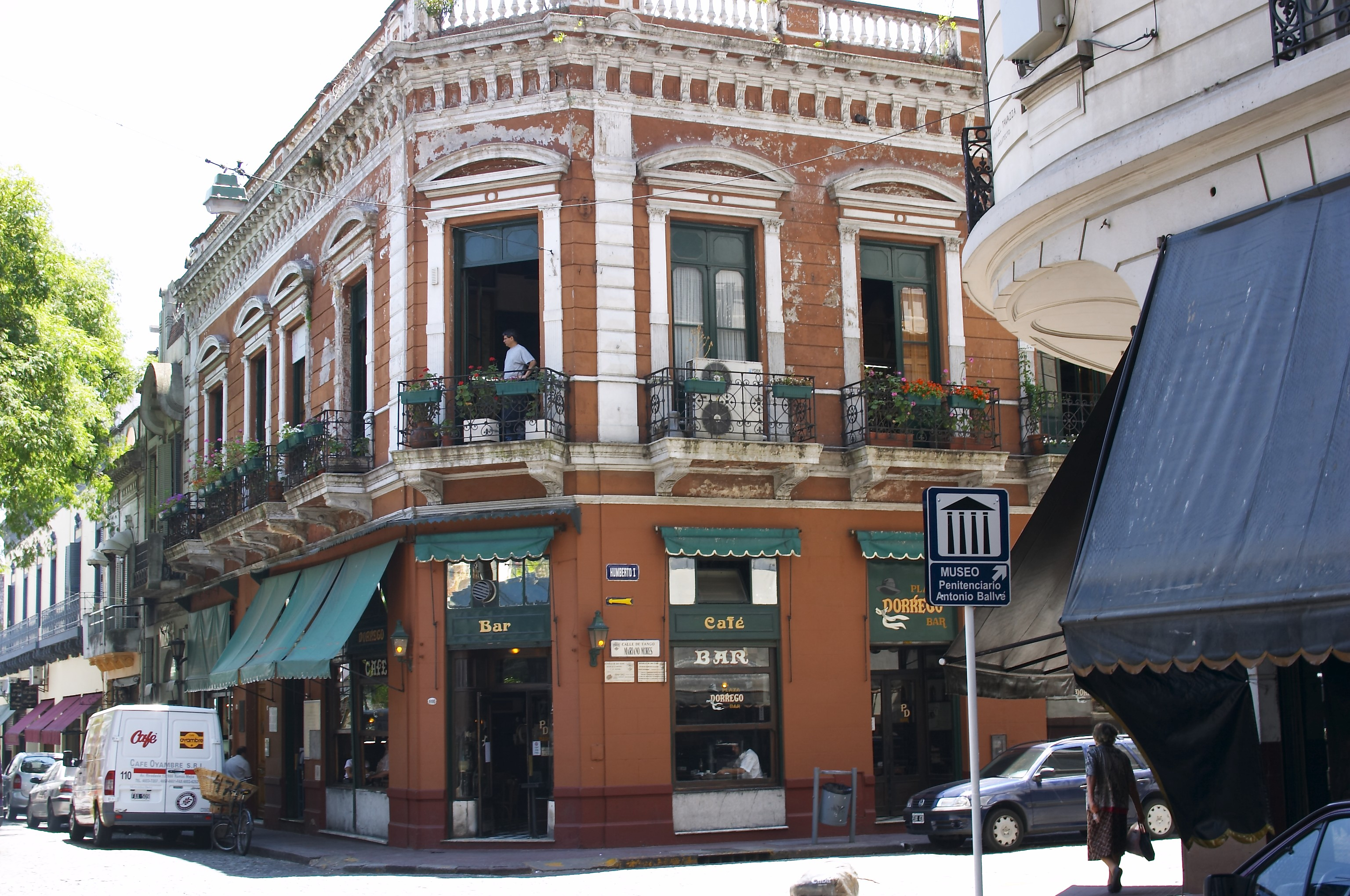
Corner café bar in San Telmo

=== Hotels ===
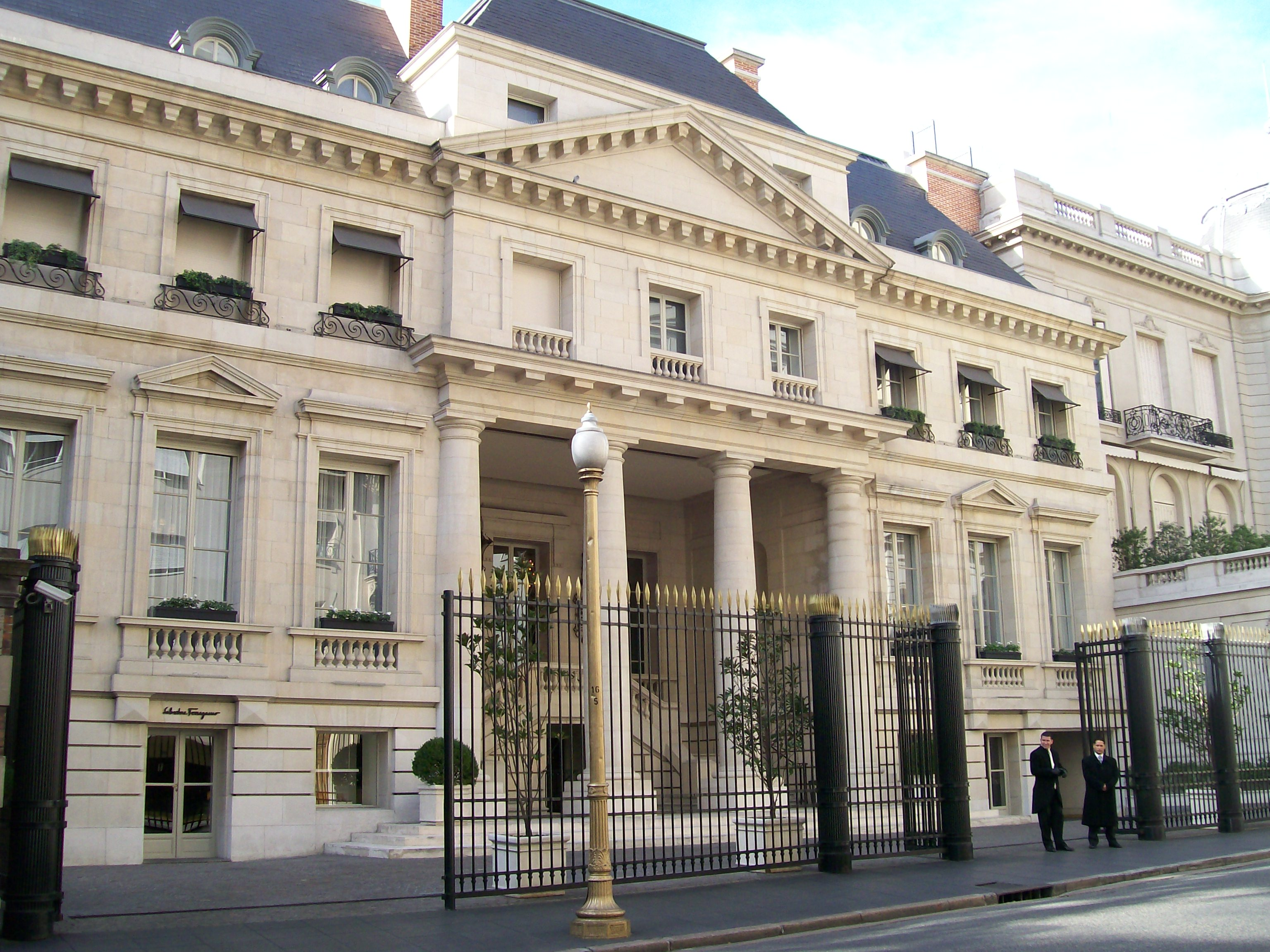
The Park Hyatt Hotel, formerly the Duhau estate

Buenos Aires has various types of accommodation, from luxurious centrally located five-star hotels to budget hotels in neighborhoods further from the city centre but with transport links.

There were, as of February 2008, 23 five-star, 61 four-star, 59 three-star and 87 two or one-star hotels, as well as 25 boutique hotels and 39 apart-hotels; another 298 hostels, bed & breakfasts, vacation rentals and other non-hotel establishments were registered in the city. In all, nearly 27,000 rooms were available for tourism in Buenos Aires, of which about 12,000 belonged to four- or five-star or boutique hotels. Higher-rated establishments typically had higher occupation rates. The majority of the hotels are located in the central part of the city, near main tourist attractions.

There are many furnished apartments for rent, ranging from small low-cost studios to expensive luxurious apartments.

== See also ==
- Tourism in Argentina
