= Bulnes (Buenos Aires Underground) =

Buenos Aires Underground station

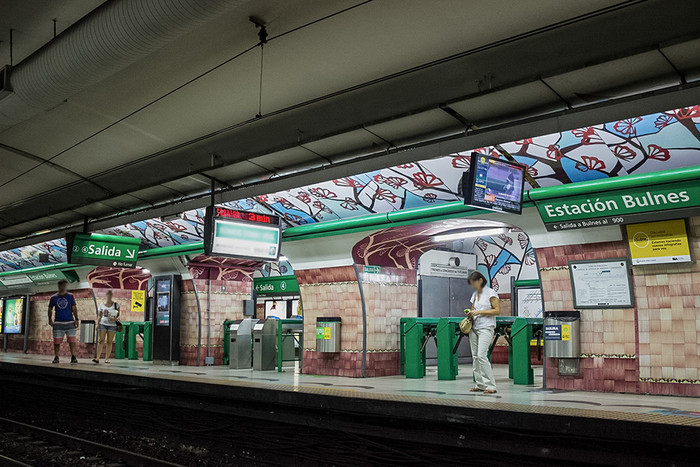

General information
- Location: Av. Santa Fe between Bulnes and Anasagasti
- Coordinates: 34°35′17.8″S 58°24′40.5″W
- Platforms: Side platforms

History
- Opened: 23 February 1940

Services
Preceding station	Buenos Aires Underground	Following station
Scalabrini Ortiz towards Congreso de Tucumán	Line D	Agüero towards Catedral
Location

Bulnes is a station on the Line D of the Buenos Aires Underground at the intersection of Avenida Santa Fe and Bulnes Street. The station was opened on 23 February 1940 as part of the extension of Line D from Tribunales to Palermo.

== Overview ==
It is an underground station and is located in neighbourhood of Palermo in Buenos Aires right beneath the Alto Palermo Shopping Centre; one of the exits from the station lead directly into the mall. In 1997 the station was declared a national historic monument.

== Gallery ==
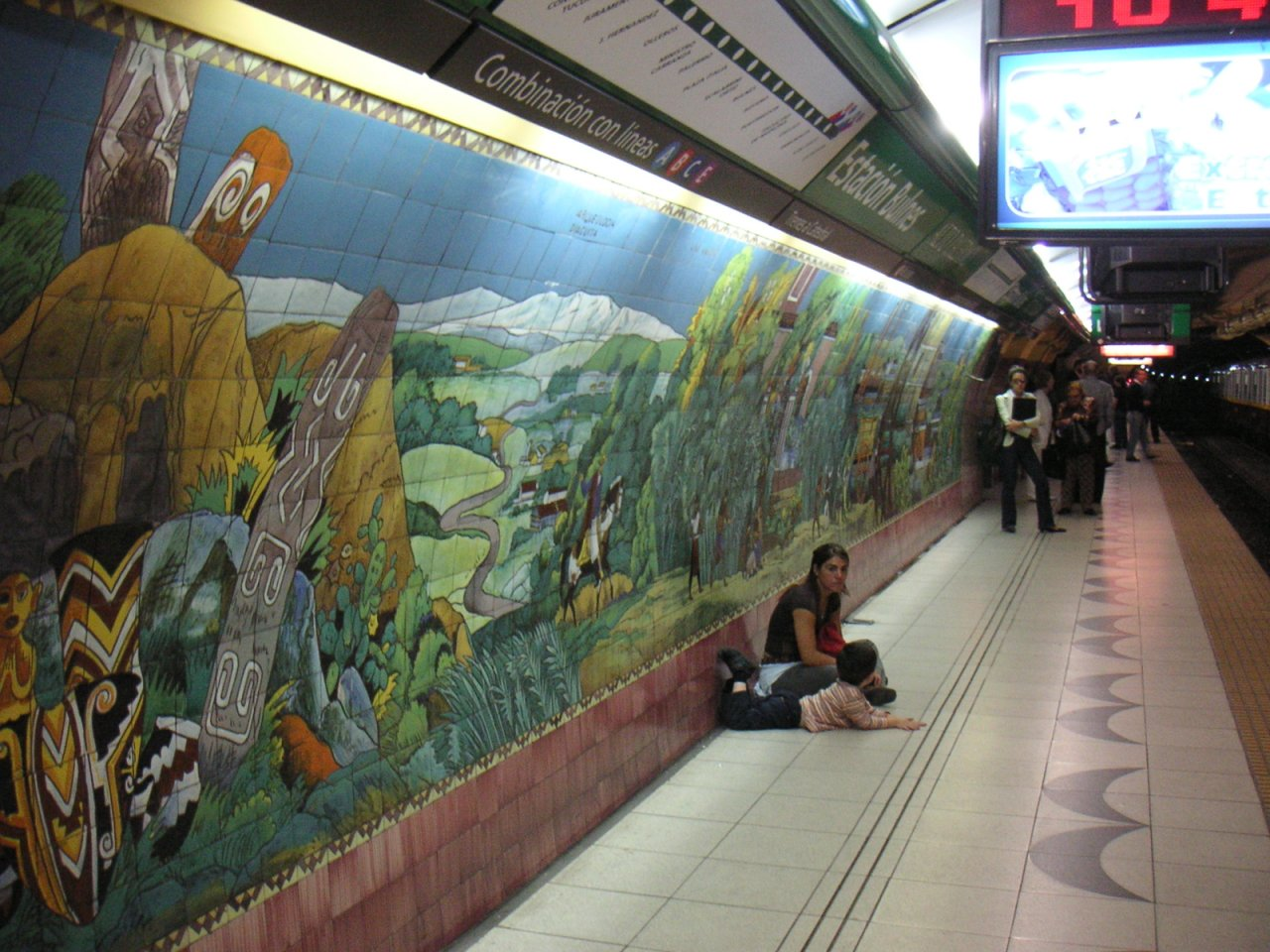
A mural in the station (1)

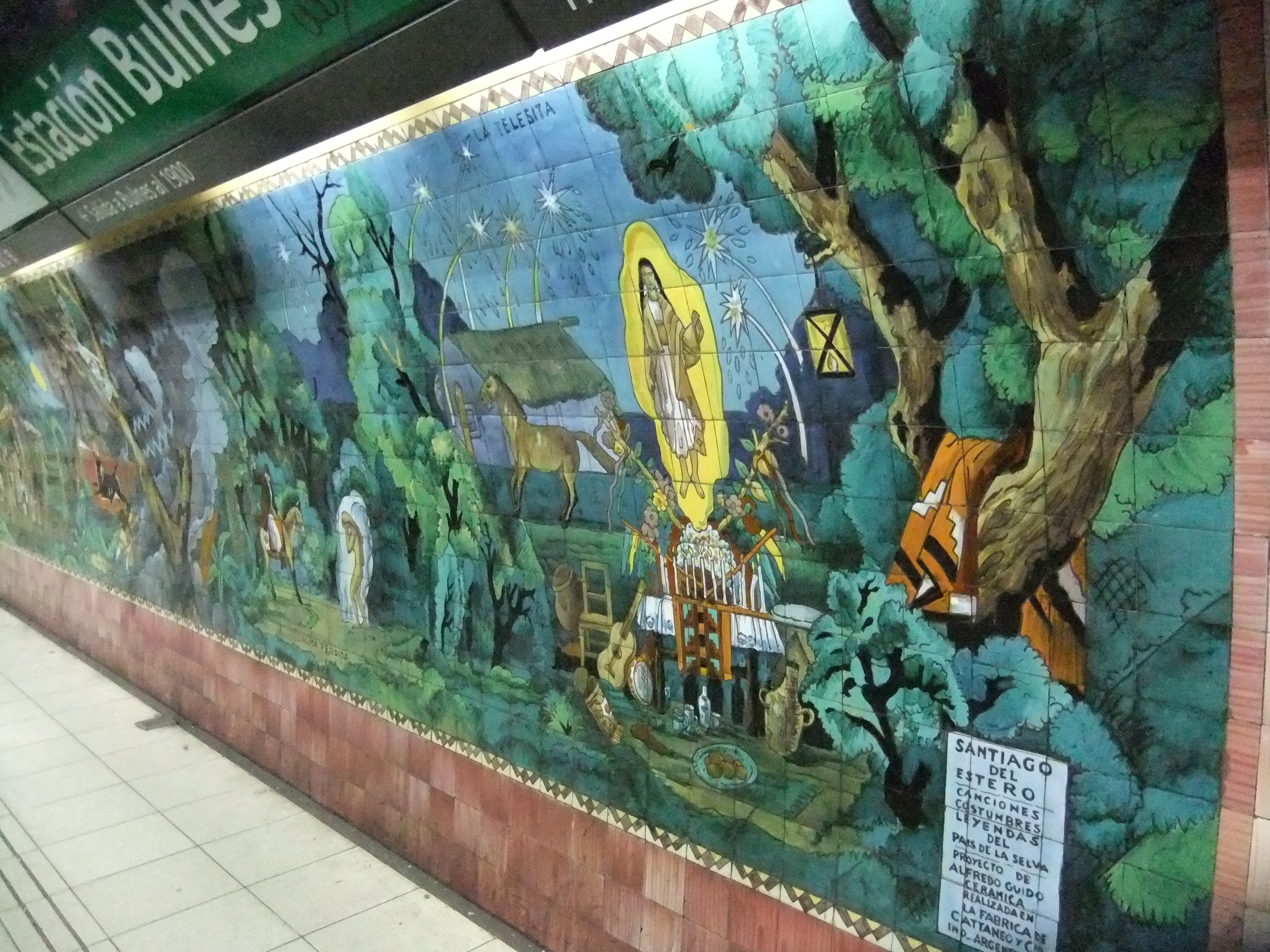
A mural in the station (2)

== See also ==
- Alto Palermo
- Avenida Santa Fe
