= Scalabrini Ortiz =

Scalabrini Ortiz may refer to:

- Raúl Scalabrini Ortiz, an Argentine writer, journalist, essayist and poet
- Scalabrini Ortiz Station, a station on Line D of the Buenos Aires Metro
