= Alto Palermo =

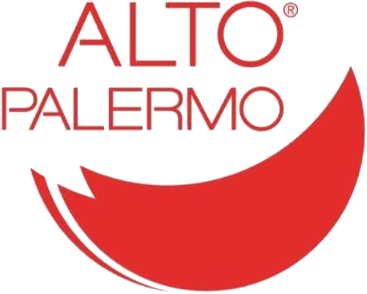

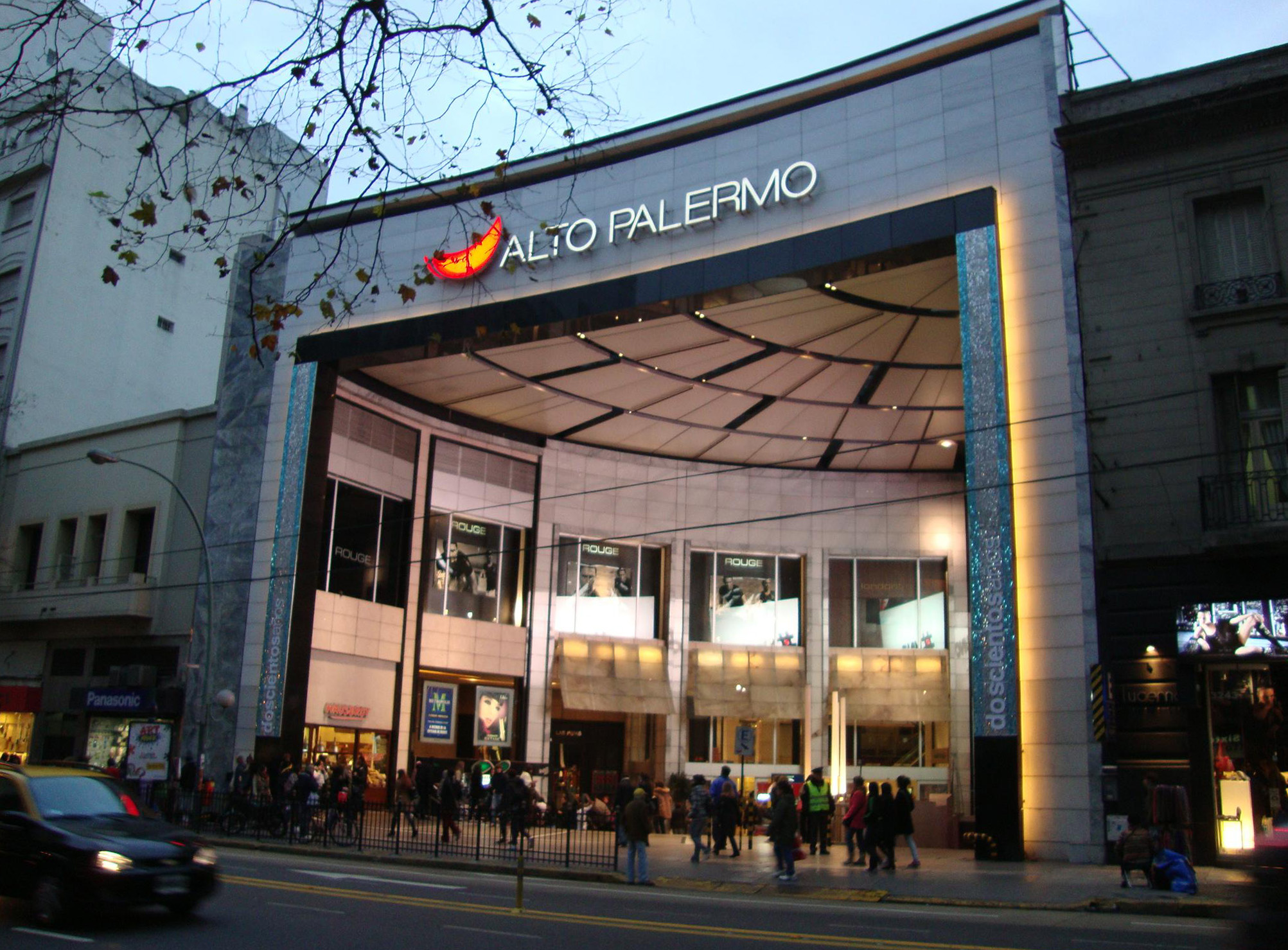
- Entrance on Av. Santa Fe
- Coordinates: 34°35′S 58°25′W
- Address: Av. Santa Fe 3253, Buenos Aires
- Opened: October 17, 1990; 36 years ago
- Owner: IRSA
- Architect: Juan Carlos López & Asoc.
- Num. of stores: 190
- Floor area: 65,029 m^{2}
- Floors: 3
- Parking: Yes
- Public transit: Subte (Bulnes station)
- Website: altopalermo.com.ar

Alto Palermo is a shopping center located in the Palermo neighborhood of the city of Buenos Aires, Argentina. It was inaugurated on 17 October 1990, thus becoming the third shopping center in Argentina after Spinetto (1988) and Unicenter (1988).

The shopping center is owned by IRSA, a company led by Eduardo Elsztain, with a minority stake held by the Chilean company Parque Arauco S.A..

== History ==
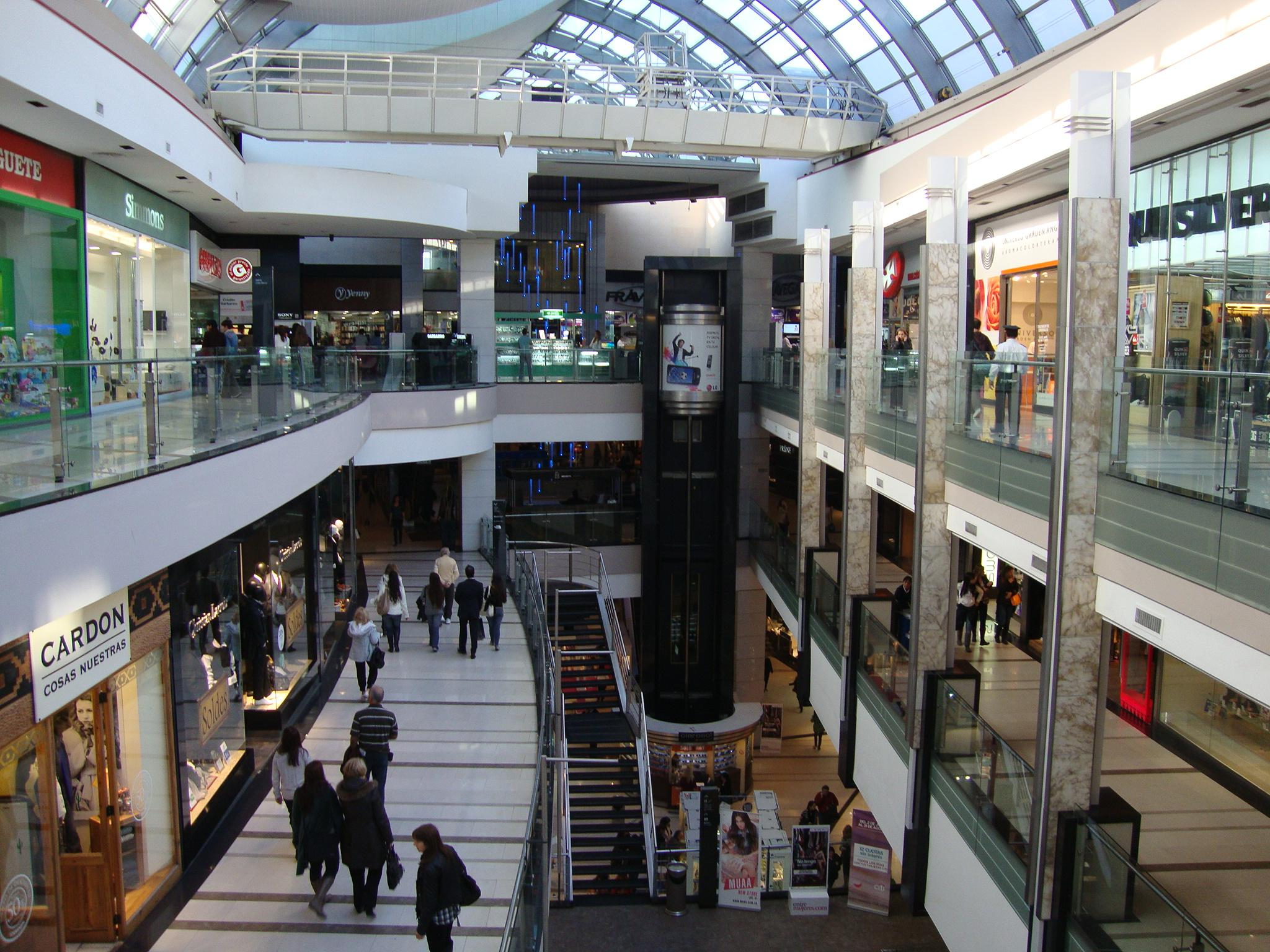
Main axis view

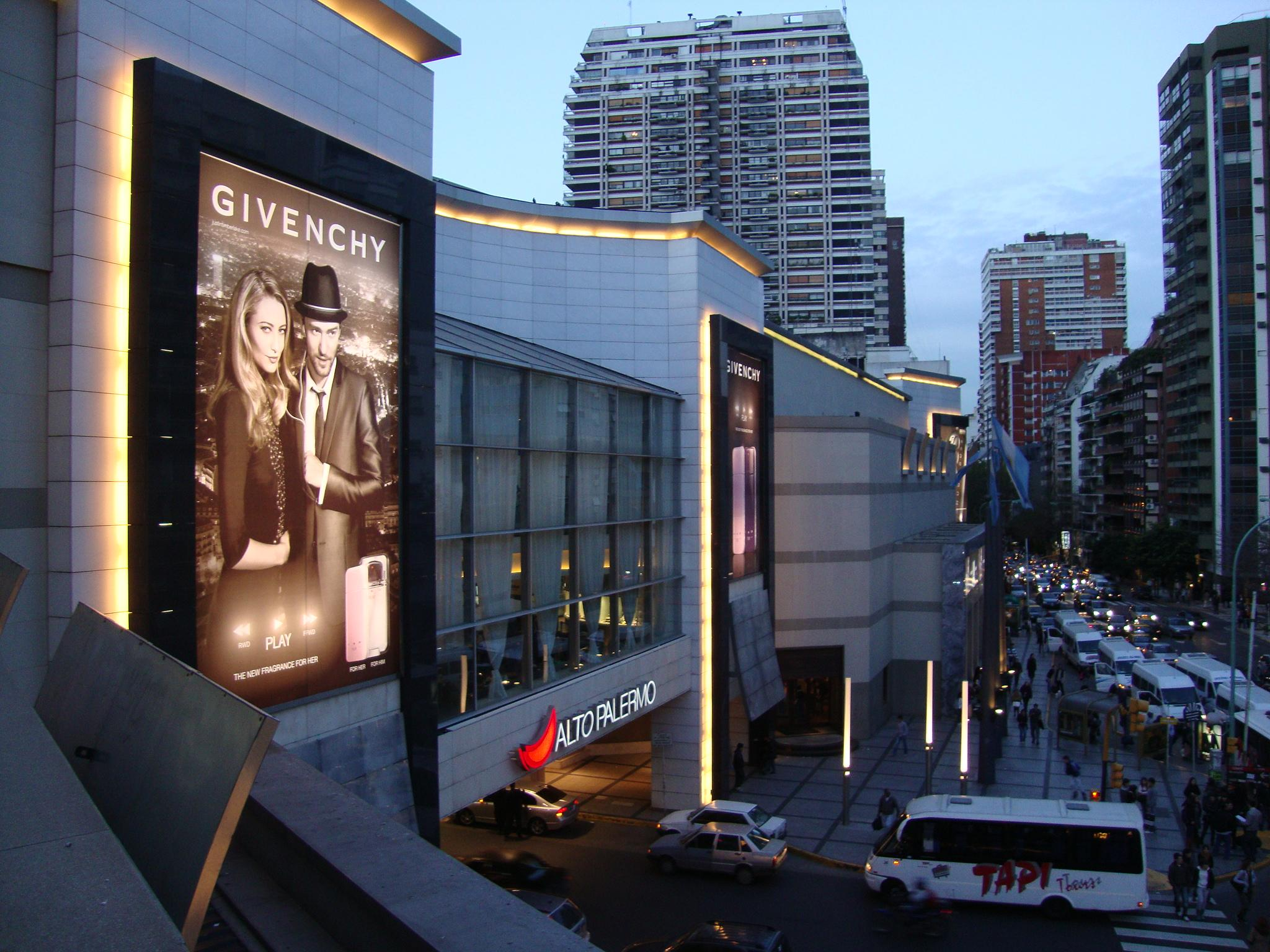
Part of the shopping was built above Arenales street. The photo shows a view of Av. Coronel Díaz from the terrace

The site currently occupied by Alto Palermo was previously home to Cervecería Palermo. This industrial plant was founded in February 1897 at the initiative of Ernesto Tornquist. In 1912, the plant was acquired by Otto Bemberg and was subsequently incorporated into Cerveza Quilmes. The plant at the intersection of Santa Fe Avenue and Coronel Diaz stopped operations in 1977. At this point, the plant underwent a process of gradual demolition to allow for the building of the shopping mall.

The shopping mall was designed by the architectural company Juan Carlos López y Asociados. This company specializes in the design of shopping malls. It designed other shopping malls in the 1990s, such as Patio Bullrich, Galerías Pacífico, and Soleil Factory. The building comprises a central axis of 200 meters along Avenida Coronel Diaz. It connects three levels via escalators and elevators. It is also equipped with a glass roof to allow for natural illumination.

The shopping center began its operations on October 17, 1990. This represents an early example of urban shopping centers that are located within Buenos Aires.

The location of the shopping center on Santa Fe Avenue, within a densely populated residential area, meant that it is an urban space that is easily accessible via public transportation. In addition, the center has a direct link to Bulnes Station on Line D of the Buenos Aires Underground. The development also facilitated the opening of Arenales Street, which passes under the complex via a tunnel. This street is the only covered street that exists in Buenos Aires.

IRSA, or Inversiones y Representaciones Sociedad Anónima, a company controlled by Eduardo Elsztain, acquired Alto Palermo S.A. in 1991. This company had been incorporated in 1889 under the name Sociedad Anónima Mercado de Abasto Proveedor (SAMAP), or the administrator of the Mercado de Abasto, until 1984. The company began a redevelopment of the site that had been occupied by a brewery. The redevelopment plan that the company implemented involved an elaborate plan for transforming the site into a modern shopping center.

The shopping center has been renovated between 2007 and 2008, which changed its original look considerably. The building was completely refurbished, seeking greater sobriety in keeping with the tastes of the moment: its colorful and metallic coatings were replaced by the monochromatism of marble and imitation granite, decorative interior objects were eliminated (such as the aluminum palm trees that flanked the main circulation and various ornaments), and the appearance of the roundabout of the food court on Arenales street, which was completely glazed and was reduced to three large windows, was completely changed. In June 2010, an 8×5 m LED screen was installed at the access on Avenida Santa Fe.

In 2018, IRSA purchased an adjacent building on Santa Fe Avenue for more than $20 million with the aim of expanding the shopping center. The expansion work included the addition of a third level with an outdoor terrace, a new food court, and a mural by urban artist Martín Ron.

== Public transport access ==
The Line D's Bulnes station of the Buenos Aires Underground is located just below the shopping center; moreover, one of the exits directly connects the mall through a ground floor of it.

On the other hand, there are several colectivos that run through the area, including 12, 29, 39, 64, 68, 92, 111, 128, 152 and 194 lines.
