= Scalabrini =

Scalabrini may refer to:

- Raúl Scalabrini Ortiz (1898–1959), Argentine writer, journalist, essayist and poet
  - Scalabrini Ortiz Station, a station on Line D of the Buenos Aires Metro
- Giovanni Battista Scalabrini (1839–1905), Italian bishop
- Missionaries of St. Charles Borromeo, a Catholic religious order also known as the Scalibrini Missionaries
