= Agüero (Buenos Aires Underground) =

Buenos Aires Underground station

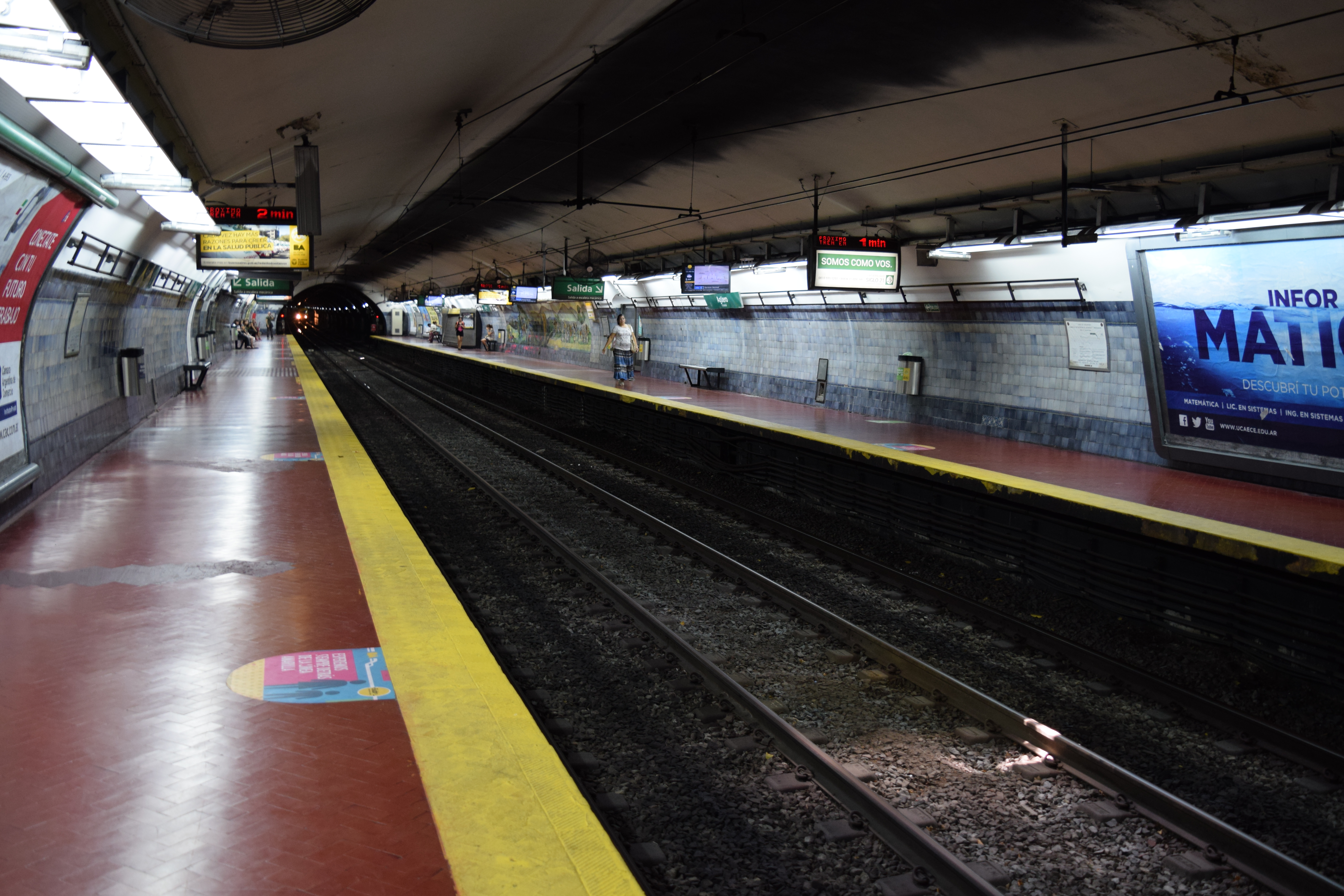

General information
- Location: Av. Santa Fe and Agüero
- Coordinates: 34°35′30″S 58°24′25.7″W
- Platforms: Side platforms

History
- Opened: 23 February 1940

Services
Preceding station	Buenos Aires Underground	Following station
Bulnes towards Congreso de Tucumán	Line D	Pueyrredón towards Catedral
Location

Agüero is a station on Line D of the Buenos Aires Underground. The station was opened on 23 February 1940 as part of the extension of Line D from Tribunales to Palermo.
