= El Ateneo Grand Splendid =

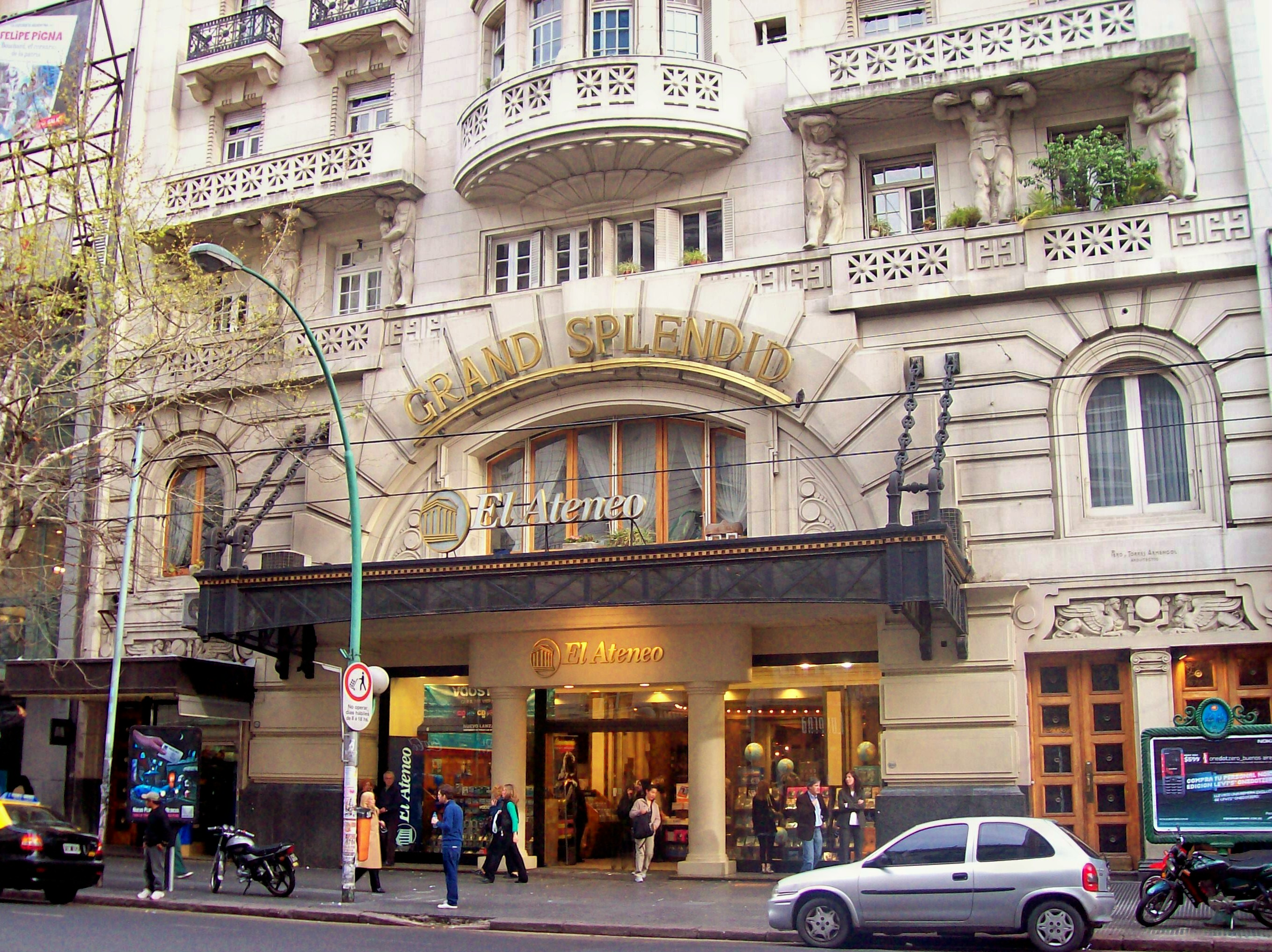
- Exterior of the store

- Location in Buenos Aires

General information
- Type: Bookstore; formerly theatre
- Location: Buenos Aires, Argentina
- Coordinates: 34°35′46″S 58°23′39″W

Website
- www.yenny-elateneo.com

El Ateneo Grand Splendid is a bookshop in Buenos Aires, Argentina. In 2008, The Guardian placed it as the second most beautiful bookshop in the world. In 2019, it was named the "world's most beautiful bookstore" by the National Geographic.

== Overview ==
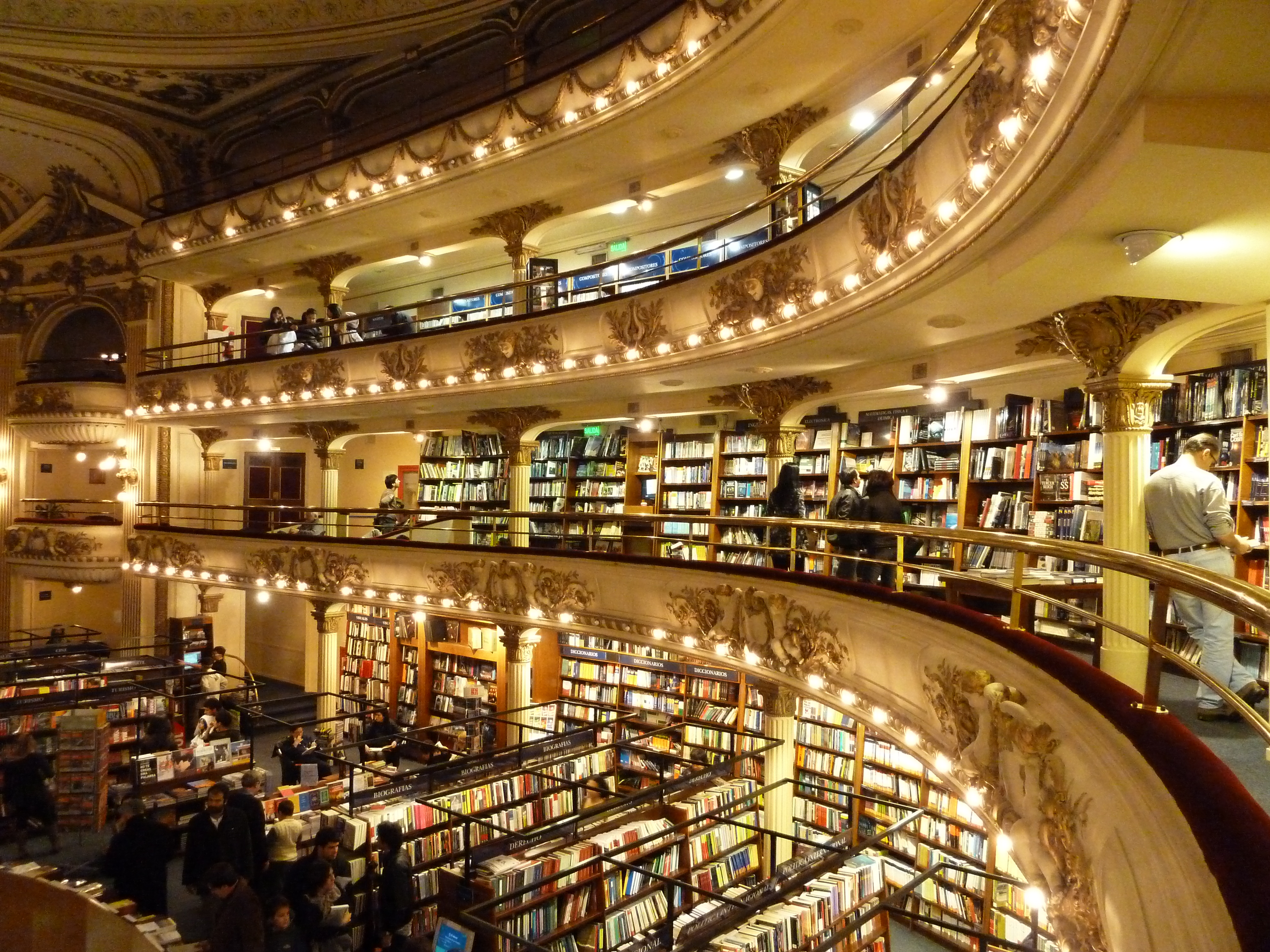
Interior of El Ateneo Grand Splendid.

Situated on Santa Fe Avenue in Barrio Norte, the building was designed by architects Peró and Torres Armengol for impresario Max Glücksmann (1875–1946), and opened as a theatre called Teatro Gran Splendid in May 1919. The eclecticist building features ceiling frescoes painted by the Italian artist Nazareno Orlandi and caryatids sculpted by Troiano Troiani, whose work also graces the cornice along the Palacio de la Legislatura de la Ciudad de Buenos Aires.

The theatre had a seating capacity of 1,050, and staged a variety of performances, including appearances by the tango artists Carlos Gardel, Francisco Canaro, Roberto Firpo and Ignacio Corsini. Glücksmann started his own radio station in 1924 (Radio Splendid), which broadcast from the building where his recording company, Nacional Odeón, made some of the early recordings of the great tango singers of the day. In the late twenties the theatre was converted into a cinema, and in 1929 showed the first sound films presented in Argentina.

The ornate former theatre was leased by Grupo Ilhsa in February 2000. Ilhsa, through Tematika, owns El Ateneo and Yenny booksellers (totaling over 40 stores), as well as the El Ateneo publishing house. The building was subsequently renovated and converted into a book and music shop under the direction of architect Fernando Manzone; the cinema seating was removed and in its place book shelves were installed. Following refurbishment works, the 2,000 m^{2} (22,000 sq ft) El Ateneo Grand Splendid became the group's flagship store, and in 2007 sold over 700,000 books; over a million people walk through its doors annually.

Customer seating has been installed throughout the building, including the still-intact theatre boxes, and a café has been created at the back of what was once the stage. The ceiling, the ornate carvings, the crimson stage curtains, the auditorium lighting and many architectural details remain. Despite the changes, the building still retains the feeling of the grand theatre it once was. The Guardian, a prominent British periodical, named El Ateneo Grand Splendid second in its 2008 list of the world's ten best bookshops. In 2019, it was named the "world's most beautiful bookstore" by the National Geographic.
