= Scalabrini Ortiz (Buenos Aires Underground) =

Buenos Aires Underground station

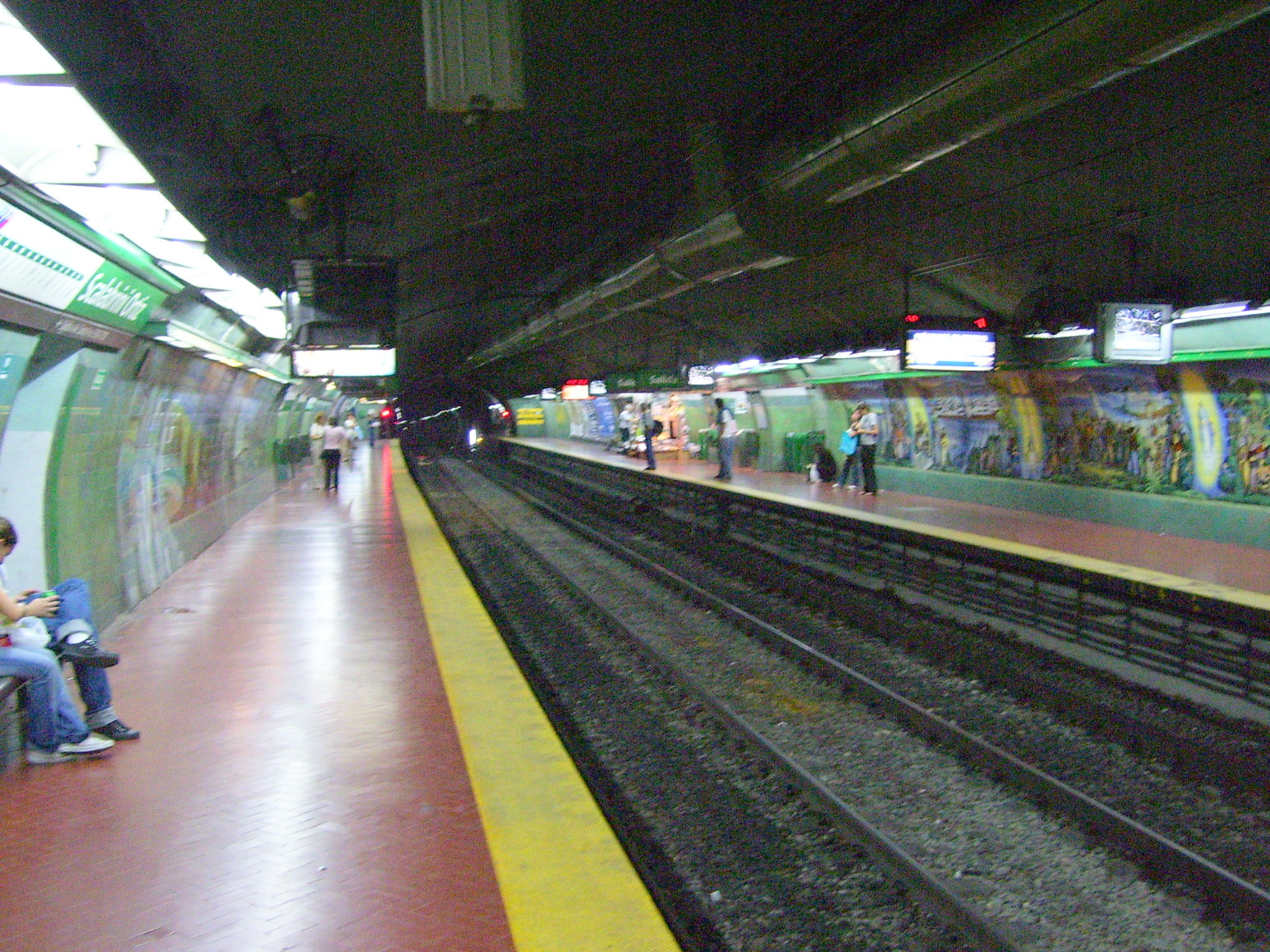

General information
- Location: Av. Santa Fe and Av. Scalabrini Ortiz
- Coordinates: 34°35′6.6″S 58°24′57.5″W
- Platforms: Side platforms

History
- Opened: 23 February 1940

Services
Preceding station	Buenos Aires Underground	Following station
Plaza Italia towards Congreso de Tucumán	Line D	Bulnes towards Catedral
Location

Scalabrini Ortiz Station is a station on Line D of the Buenos Aires Underground. The station was opened on 23 February 1940 as part of the extension of Line D from Tribunales to Palermo.

It is located at the intersection of Avenida Santa Fe and Avenida Scalabrini Ortiz.

It was initially known as "Canning", after the nearby avenue, which was in turn named after the British minister George Canning. The avenue was renamed as Raúl Scalabrini Ortiz in 1974, during the government of Juan Perón. The National Reorganization Process restored the initial name in 1976, and renamed it as "2 de abril" during the Falklands War. The name "Scalabrini Ortiz" was restored once more in 1985, during the presidency of Raúl Alfonsín, and keeps being used to this day.

== Gallery ==
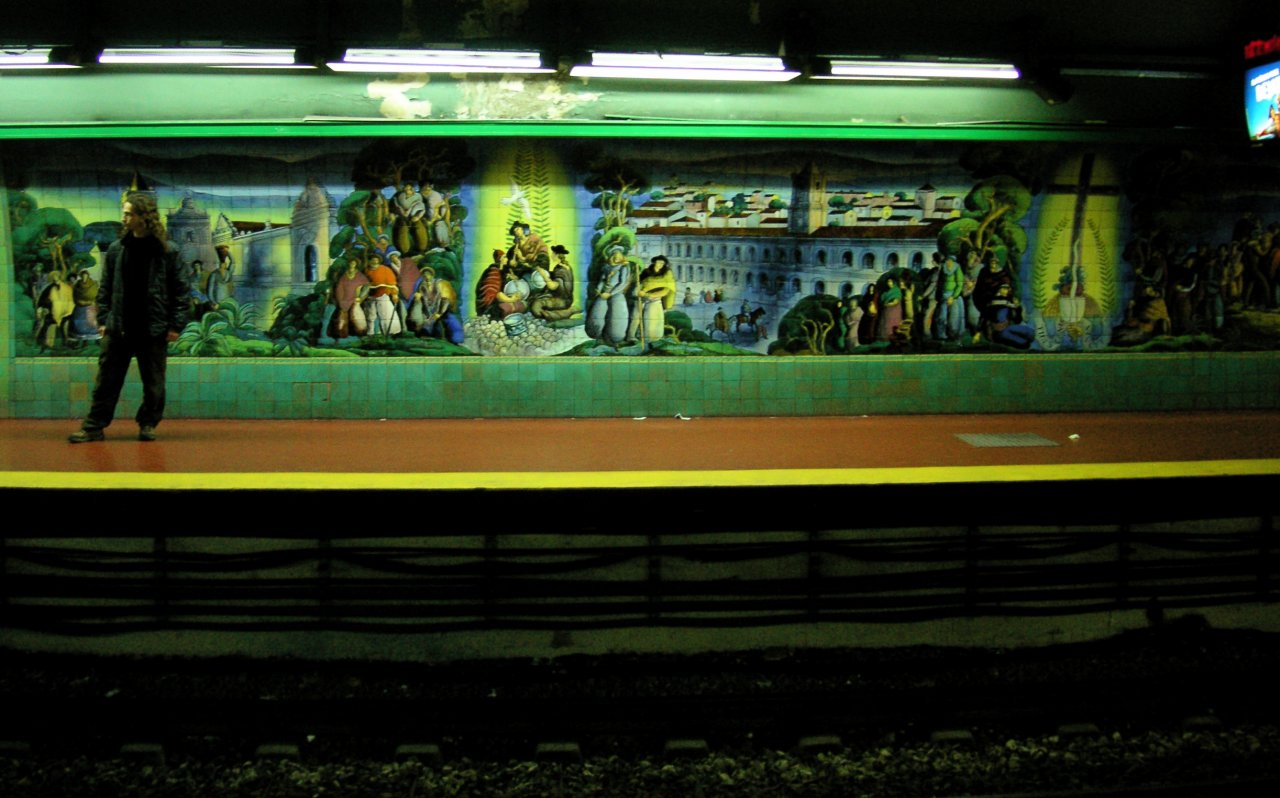
Platform view

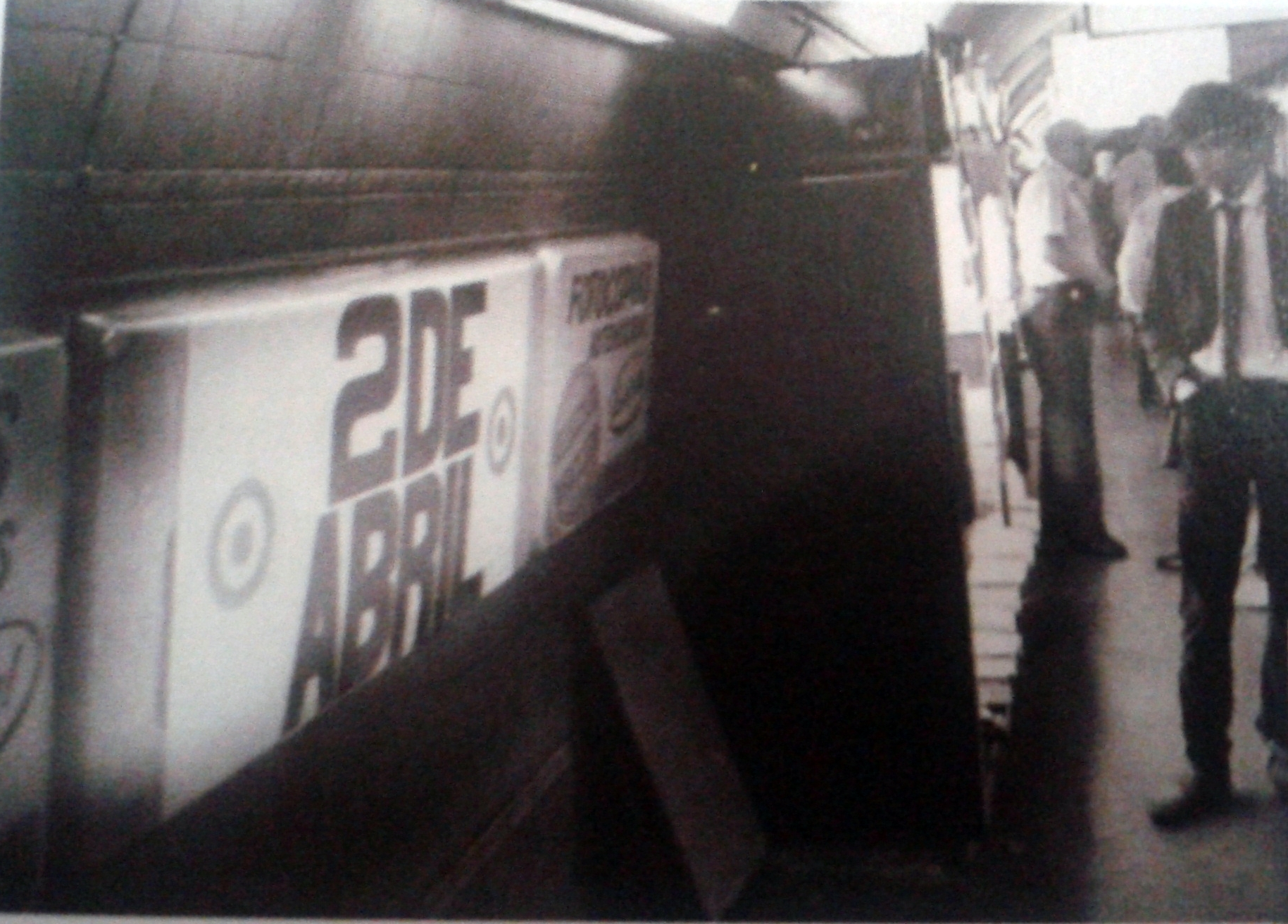
The station in 1982, when it was named "2 de Abril"
