= Avenida Santa Fe =

Avenue in Buenos Aires, Argentina

Coordinates: 34°35′32″S 58°24′23″W

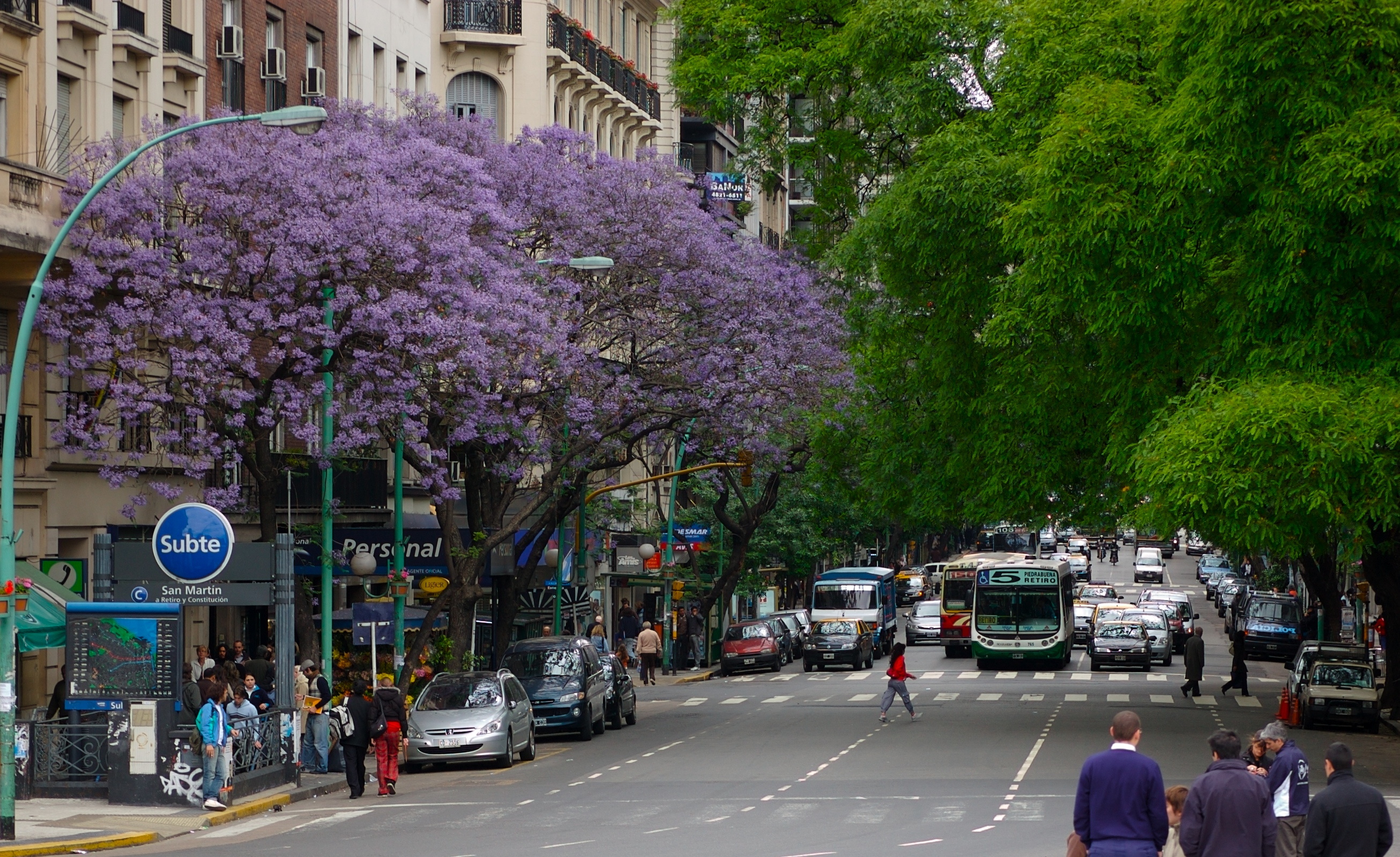
Santa Fe Avenue between Maipú and Esmeralda Streets.

Avenida Santa Fe is one of the principal thoroughfares in Buenos Aires, Argentina. The artery is essential to the imaginary axis of Barrio Norte in Buenos Aires, comprising the areas influenced by the route of the avenue through Retiro, Recoleta and Palermo neighborhoods, it is considered one of the main shopping and strolling areas of the city, its many boutiques range from elegant to edgy, which has led it to be dubbed the 'Avenue of Fashion'. Upscale Alto Palermo, at Avenida Coronel Díaz, is one of the city's best-known vertical malls. Avenida Santa Fe is also an attraction for its architecture, strongly reminiscent of Paris. Its name pays homage to the eponymous province in Argentina.

== History ==
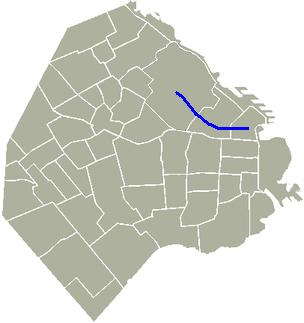
Location of Santa Fe Avenue in Buenos Aires.

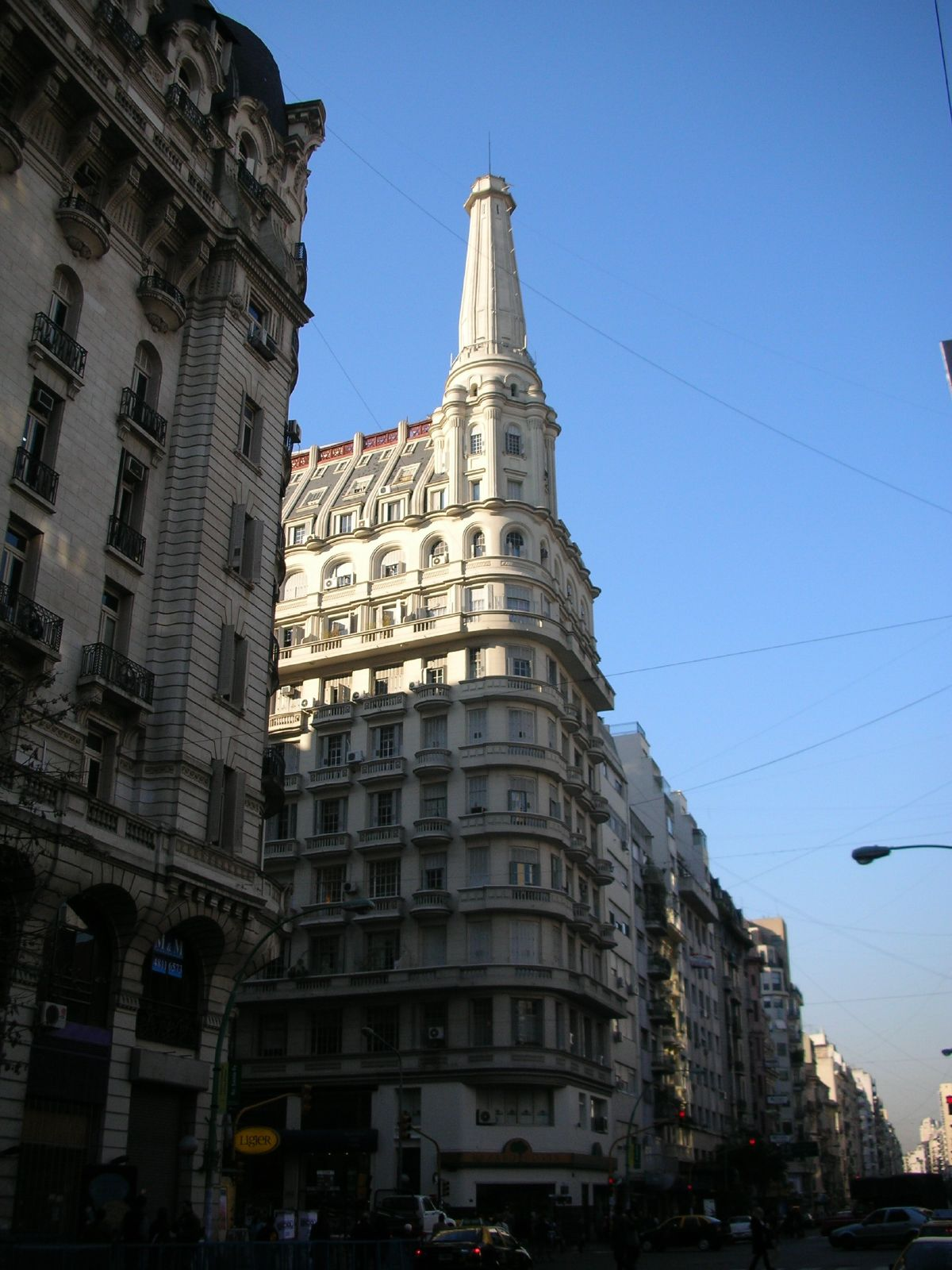
Eastbound on Santa Fe, past Callao Avenue.

First laid out in colonial Buenos Aires as San Gregorio Street in 1774, it was at the time the northern limit of the growing port city. Following the British invasions of the Río de la Plata in 1806, it was renamed for one of the popular heroes of the invasion's defeat, Pío Rodríguez. The declaration of autonomy from the Spanish Empire in 1810 led city officials to rename it Calle Estrecha (the "Narrow Street"). The progressive Governor of the Province of Buenos Aires, Martín Rodríguez, had the narrow street widened in 1822, following which Bernardino Rivadavia, the first President of Argentina, renamed it Santa Fe Avenue. Mayor Torcuato de Alvear, inspired by the urban redevelopment works in Paris at the hand of Baron Haussmann, drew up master plans for major boulevards, running east to west, every six blocks and in the 1880s, the avenue was included in the plan and widened. A 1967 ordinance made the avenue a one-way thoroughfare, west to east.

== Overview ==
Santa Fe Avenue officially begins on the southern end of Plaza San Martín and the northern end of pedestrian Florida Street. The avenue affords a view of the Art Deco Kavanagh Building and Plaza Hotel (officially on Florida St.) and passes by the former Haedo and Paz palaces (today public buildings) before leaving the plaza's leafy surroundings. It continues westward along the Retiro area, passing by the Brunetta ("Olivetti") Building (built in 1964, one of the first in Buenos Aires designed in the International Style) and through the massive Avenida 9 de Julio, which was opened through the Retiro area in the early 1970s. The Greek Revivalist Argentine Scientific Society and the Art Deco Regina Theatre follow and, past Avenida Callao, Santa Fe Avenue enters its Recoleta stretch. This stretch of the upscale thoroughfare is considered one of the main shopping districts in the city.

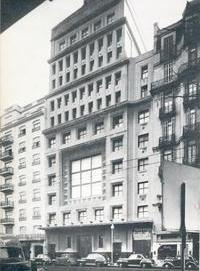
"Casa del Teatro" an Art Deco building at no.1243

Just past Callao Avenue, the former Grand Splendid Theatre was converted in 2000 into the El Ateneo Grand Splendid bookstore, the most important in Latin America. Past Pueyrredón Avenue, line of the Buenos Aires Underground was laid out underneath Santa Fe in the 1920s. The availability of frequent subway stations past this point has helped maintain the more residential setting of the remaining stretches of the avenue. Past Coronel Díaz Avenue, the avenue provides easy access to the Alto Palermo Shopping Center, one of the most important in Buenos Aires. Entering the Palermo district, it continues past the Buenos Aires Zoo, the Botanical Garden and Plaza Italia, a point overlooked by the Monument to the "Sword of Italy," Giuseppe Garibaldi. The avenue continues past the Argentine Rural Society's ornate exposition grounds and into the Carranza Viaduct, where it becomes Cabildo Avenue.

Shopping and strolling through Avenida Santa Fe

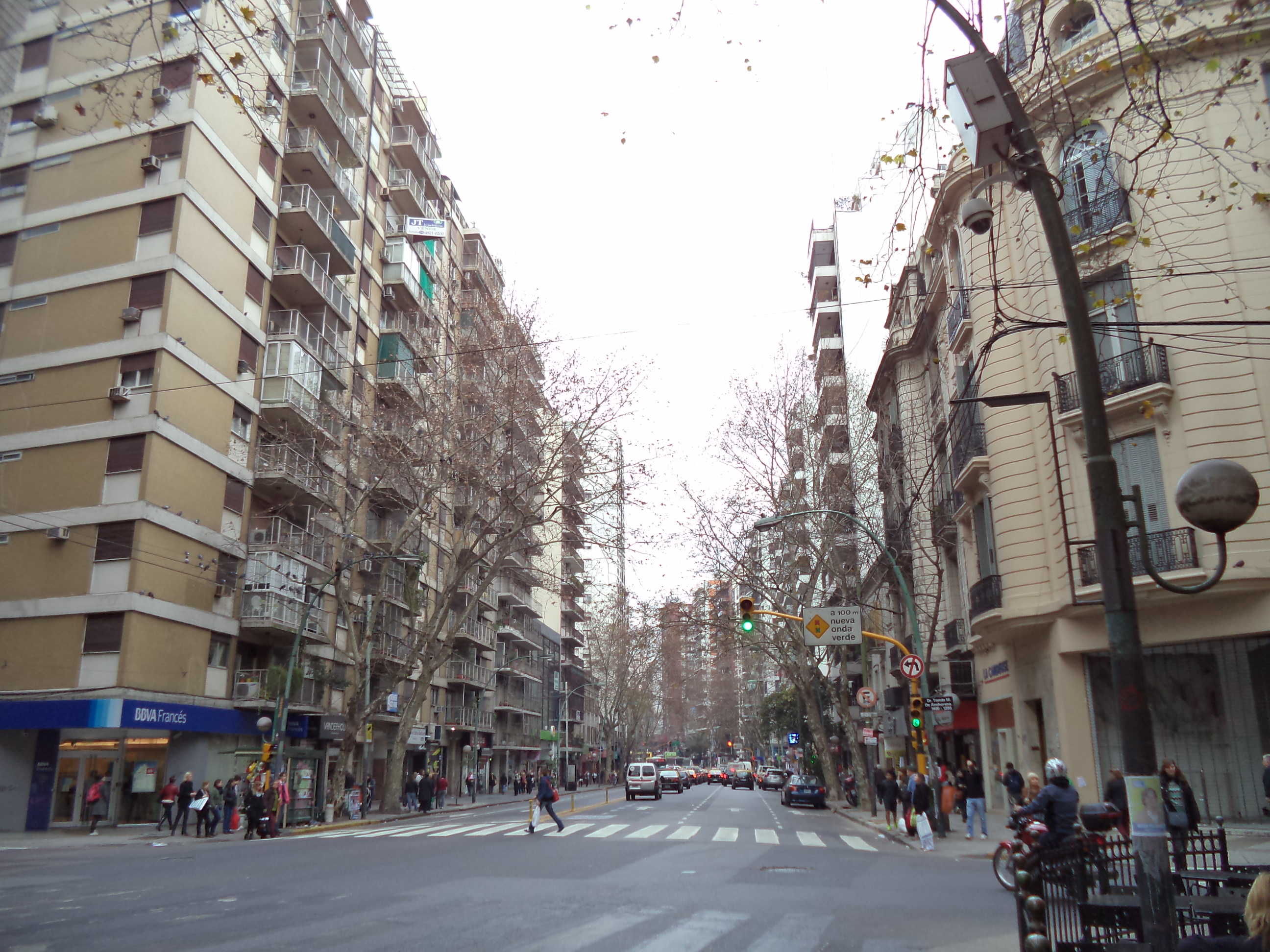
View from Anchorena Street

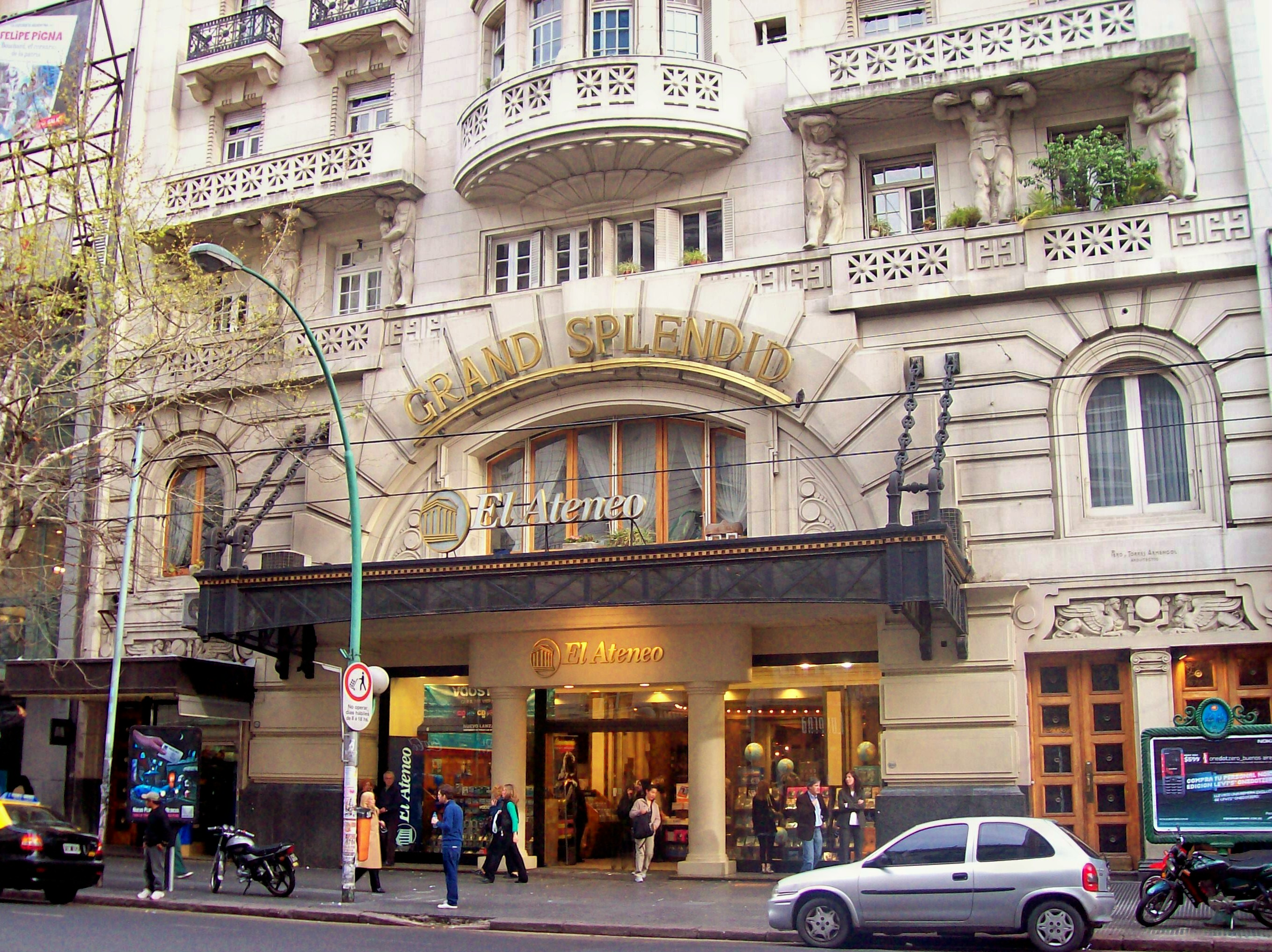
El Ateneo Grand Splendid bookstore

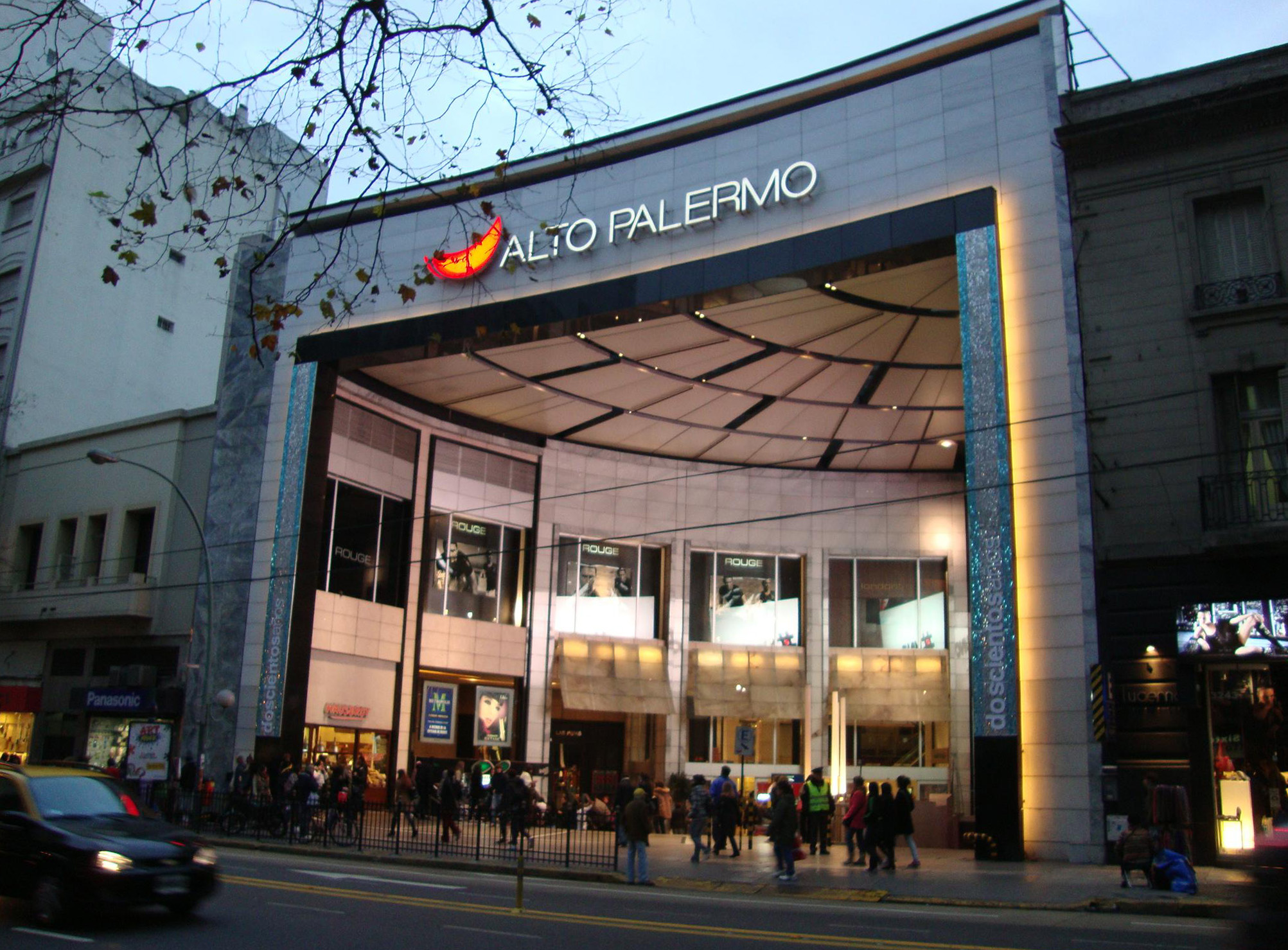
Alto Palermo Shopping Centre
