= Barrio Norte, Buenos Aires =

Coordinates: 34°35′30″S 58°24′04″W

Barrio Norte
- Unofficial Neighbourhood
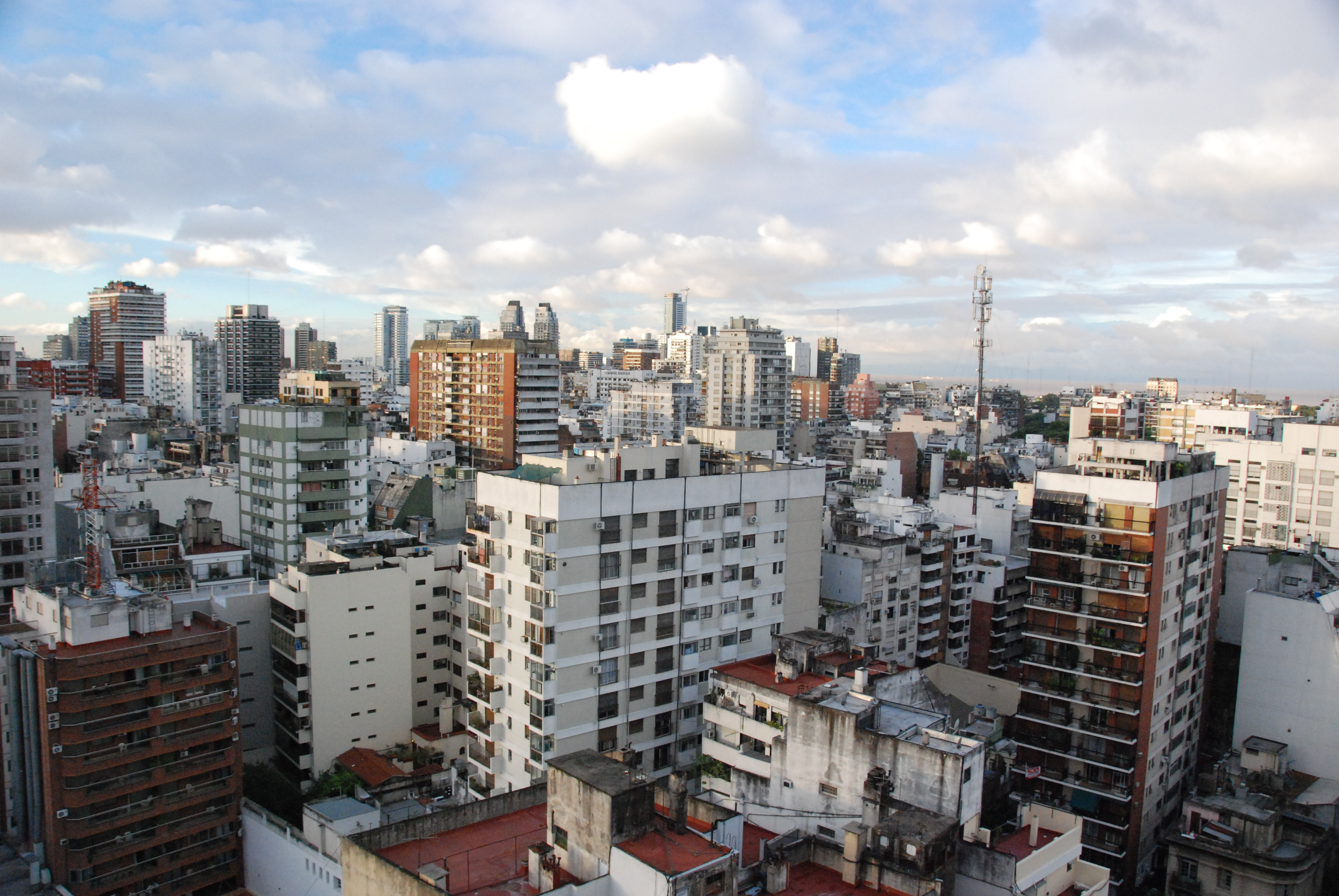
- View of the area referred as Barrio Norte
- Interactive map of Barrio Norte
- Country: Argentina
- Autonomous City: Buenos Aires
- Barrio: Recoleta

Barrio Norte (English: Northern neighborhood) is the informal name given to a part of Buenos Aires centering on Santa Fe Avenue and the district of Recoleta.

== Characteristics ==
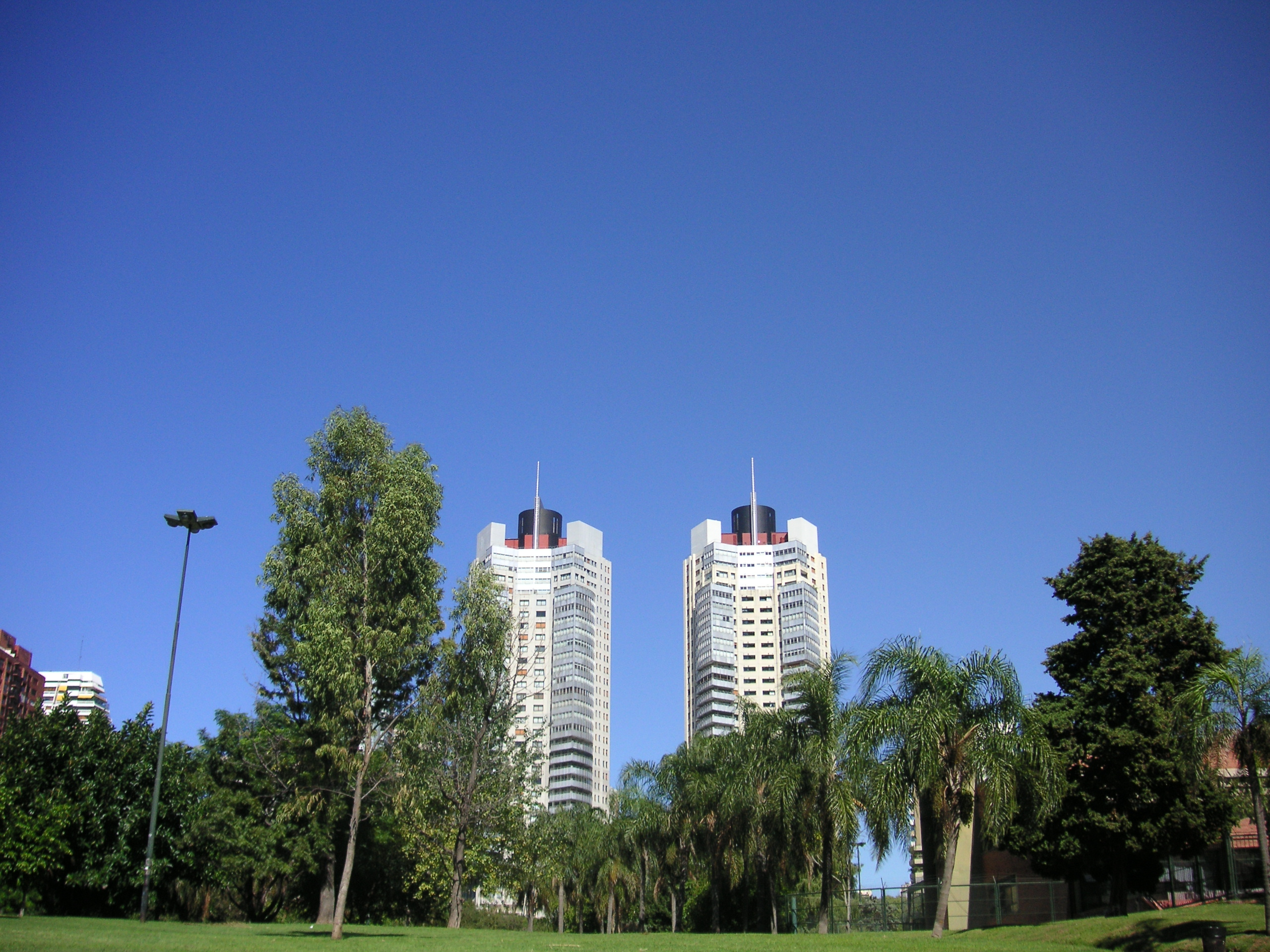
Las Heras Park, the densely populated neighborhood's principal green space.

To the east, the area forms a certain architectural unit that resembles it to Paris, a feature that is progressively lost towards the west, bordering Palermo, where modern apartment buildings predominate. Barrio Norte is characterized by its opulence, great cultural life, its architecture, its palaces, residences, museums and large parks.

== Overview ==
An unofficial neighborhood, Barrio Norte is roughly equivalent to the Recoleta district, though it generally refers to the portion south of Las Heras Avenue. Barrio Norte also includes northern parts of the Balvanera district, eastern parts of Palermo and the portion of Retiro west of the Nueve de Julio Avenue. Its population exceeds 200,000.

The name (which stems from the area's location relative to the city center) took hold when people began relocating to the area from the San Telmo and Montserrat districts following the 1871 yellow fever epidemic. An area of comfortable rowhouses during the early 20th century, it became a focus of highrise apartment development as early as the 1930s.

Santa Fe Avenue became the preferred venue for upscale shopping in Buenos Aires during the 1950s and '60s, and the profile of the area surrounding it grew in popularity among the emerging Argentine upper middle class, particularly after the 1961 demolition of the National Pentitentiary for the creation of the 8-hectare (20 acre) Las Heras Park. Real estate agents started touting "Barrio Norte" as a distinguishing feature in their advertising, expanding its reach into Balvanera and Old Palermo.

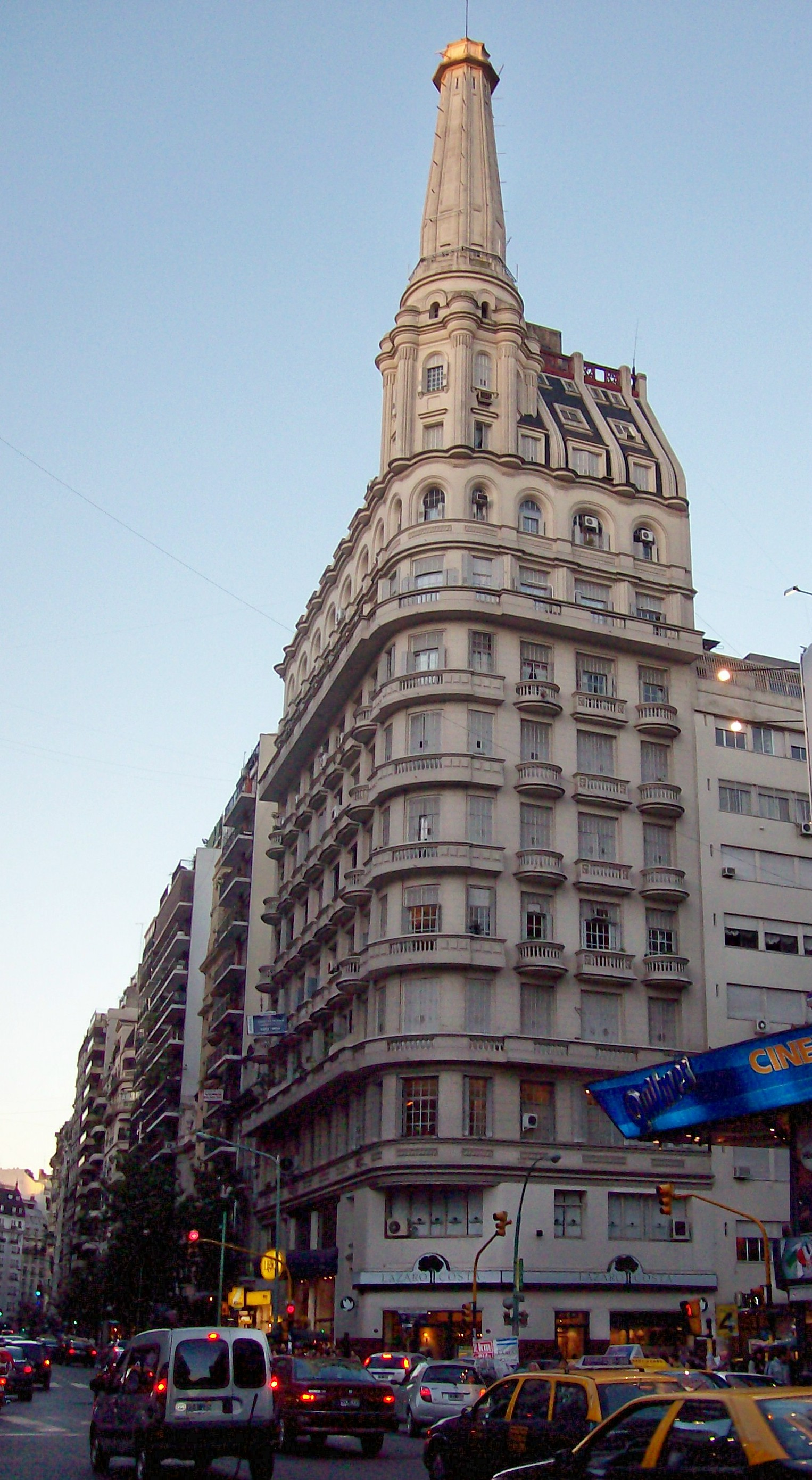
Corner of Callao and Santa Fe Avenues.

With the advent of popular indoor shopping malls in the 1980s, Santa Fe lost some of its allure, especially with theater-goers, even though it remains a very active commercial thoroughfare. It is also served by Line D of the subte (subway) and a large number of bus lines.

The area around the corner of Santa Fe and Salguero is sometimes known as Villa Freud due to the large number of psychologist offices in the area (with a significant proportion of practitioners of the Freud and Lacan variants of psychoanalysis).

Since the advent of democracy in 1983, Santa Fe has been the preferred street for gay pick-up, even though no part of it has morphed into a distinctly gay village. The area has seen hundreds of Belle Époque apartment buildings demolished to make way to modern high-rises, particularly since 1990. This had led to the creation of numerous societies devoted to their protection; thanks in part to their efforts, a number of exemplary buildings from the era have been refurbished, instead.

José Hernández wrote his poem El gaucho Martín Fierro while living in an inn located in the area.
