= Avenida Coronel Díaz =

Street in Buenos Aires, Argentina

Coordinates: 34.589764°S 58.41056°W

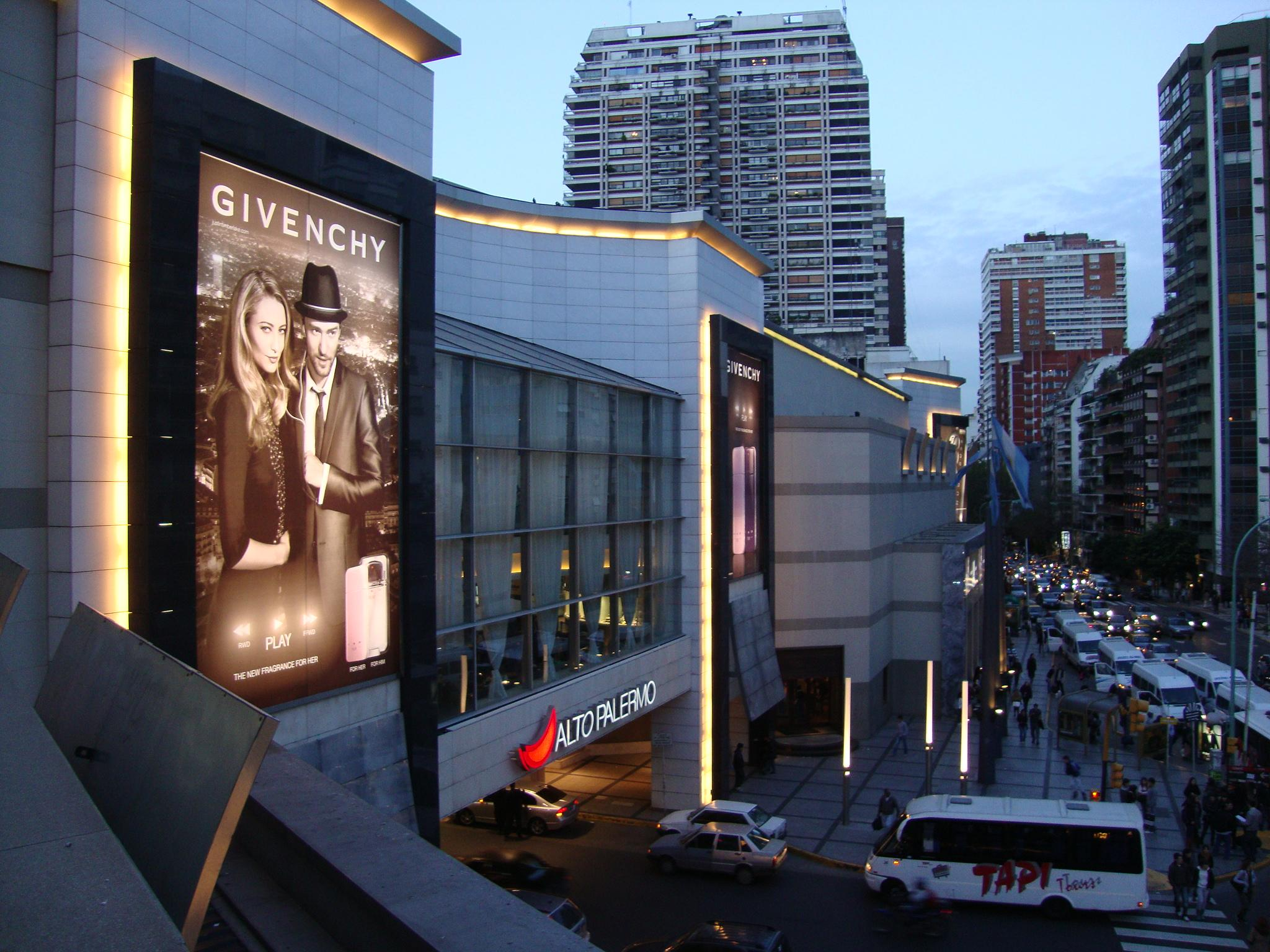
Avenida Coronel Díaz

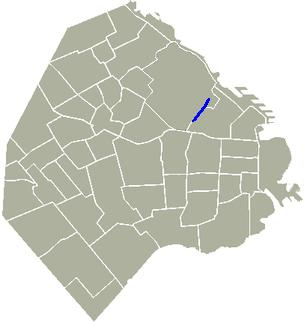
Location of Avenida Coronel Díaz in Buenos Aires

Avenida Coronel Díaz is an avenue that marks the limit between the Palermo and Recoleta neighborhoods in Buenos Aires, Argentina, and extends northbound, parallel Pueyrredón Avenue. It starts on Soler Street and ends on Castex Street, passing along Las Heras Park and the nearby Alto Palermo Shopping Center.

The avenue was so named in 1894 in honor of Colonel Pedro José Díaz (1801–1857), who played an important role in the Army of the Andes during the Argentine War of Independence of the 1810s, in the Cisplatine War of the 1820s, and on behalf of Governor Juan Manuel de Rosas, for whom he led the Infantry during the Battle of Caseros of 1852.
