= Piedras (Buenos Aires Underground) =

Buenos Aires Underground station

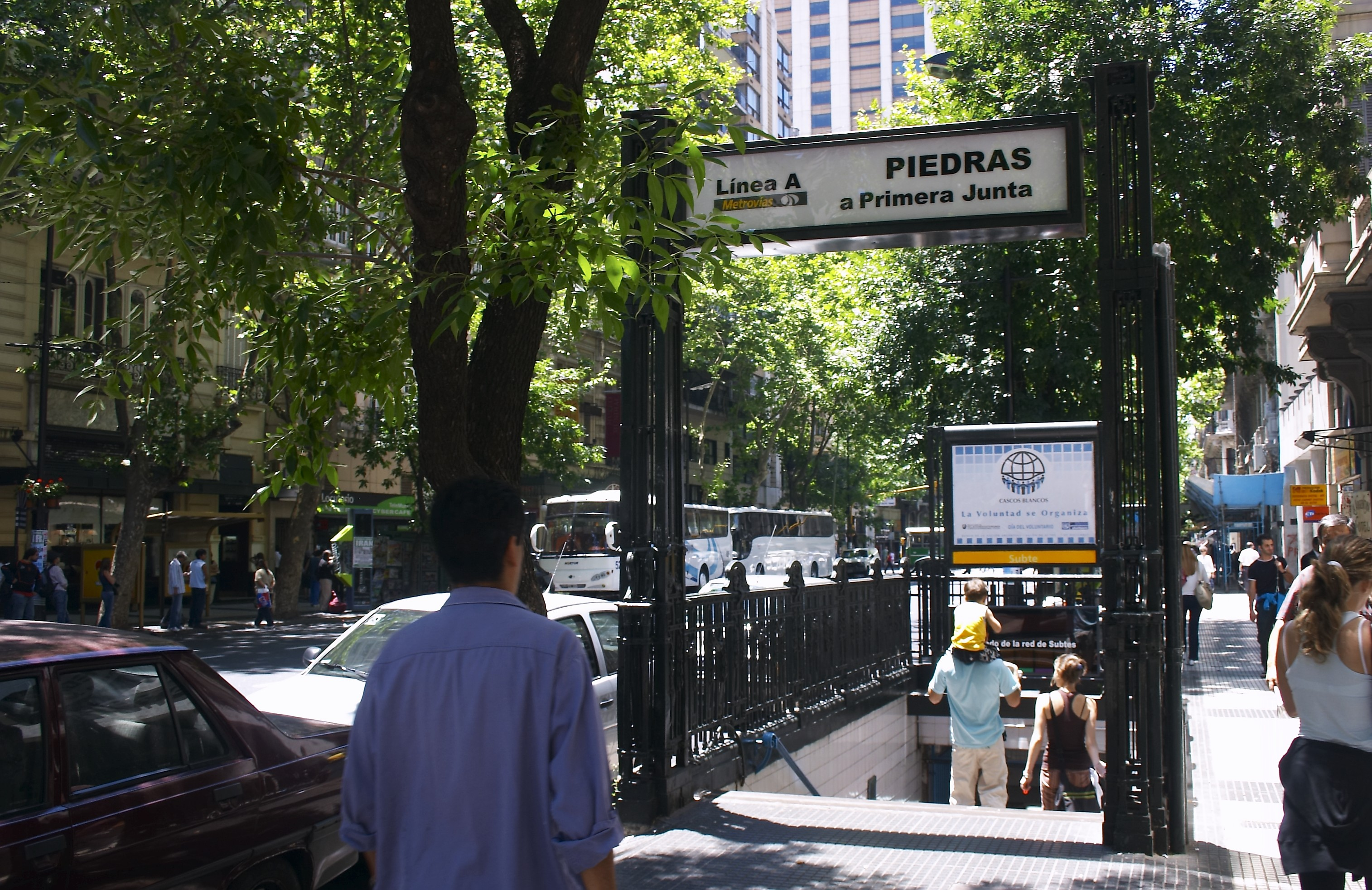

General information
- Location: Avenida de Mayo and Piedras
- Coordinates: 34°36′32″S 58°22′44.7″W
- Platforms: Side platforms

History
- Opened: 1 December 1913

Services
Preceding station	Buenos Aires Underground	Following station
Lima towards San Pedrito	Line A	Perú towards Plaza de Mayo
Location

Piedras is a station on Line A of the Buenos Aires Underground. It is located underneath the Avenida de Mayo in the neighbourhood of Monserrat and one of its entrances is located next to the famous Café Tortoni. The station belonged to the inaugural section of the Buenos Aires Underground opened on 1 December 1913, which linked the stations Plaza Miserere and Plaza de Mayo.
