= Puán (Buenos Aires Underground) =

Buenos Aires Underground station

Puan
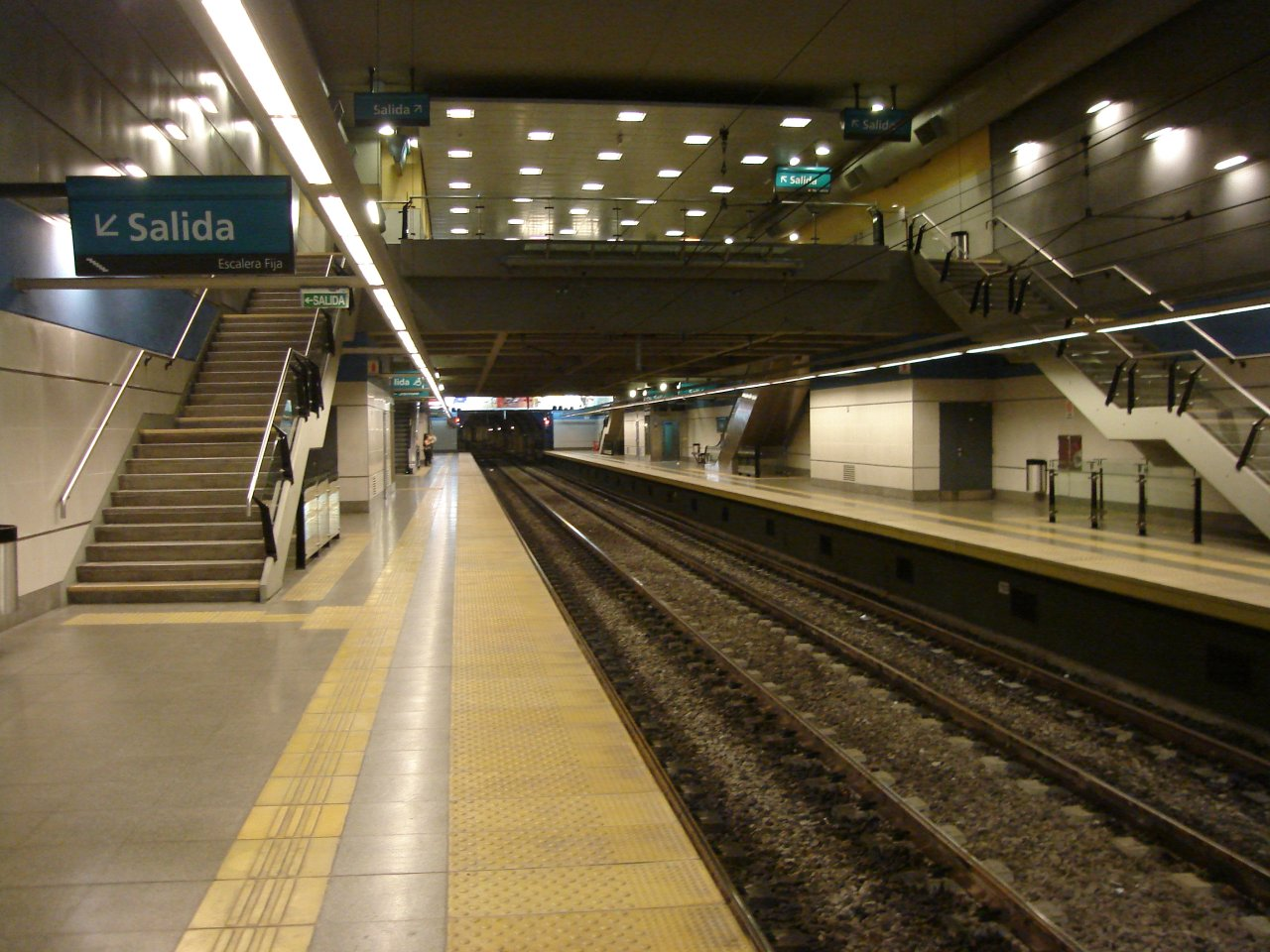

General information
- Location: Avenida Rivadavia and Puan
- Coordinates: 34°37′24.8″S 58°26′55.0″W
- Platforms: Side platforms

Construction
- Accessible: Yes

History
- Opened: 23 December 2008

Services
Preceding station	Buenos Aires Underground	Following station
Carabobo towards San Pedrito	Line A	Primera Junta towards Plaza de Mayo
Location

Puan is a station on Line A of the Buenos Aires Underground. The station was opened on 23 December 2008 as part of the extension of the line from Primera Junta to Carabobo.

The station is the closest station to the School of Philosophy at the University of Buenos Aires.
