= Primera Junta (Buenos Aires Underground) =

Buenos Aires Underground station

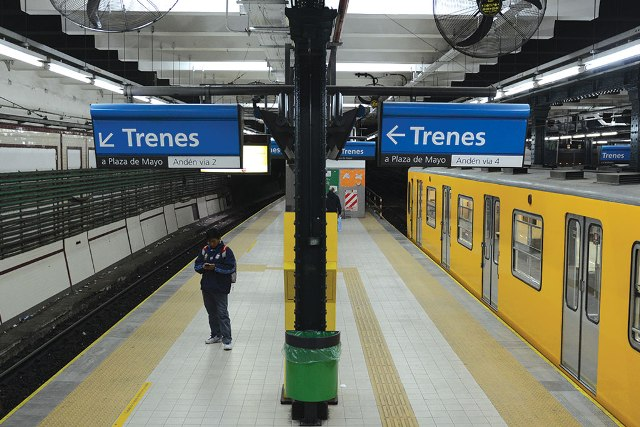

General information
- Location: Avenida Rivadavia and Del Barco Centenera
- Coordinates: 34°37′14.6″S 58°26′29.2″W
- Platforms: Island platforms
- Connections: Sarmiento Line

History
- Opened: 1 July 1914
- Former names: Caballito, Centenera

Services
Preceding station	Buenos Aires Underground	Following station
Puán towards San Pedrito	Line A	Acoyte towards Plaza de Mayo
Location

Primera Junta is a station on Line A of the Buenos Aires Underground. It lies at the intersection of Rivadavia Avenue and Del Barco Centenera street, in the neighborhood of Caballito and connects with Caballito station on the Sarmiento Line commuter rail service. The Buenos Aires Historic Tramway (Spanish: Tramway Histórico de Buenos Aires) operates tram cars on a 12-block loop of street tracks used by rapid transit trains en route to the Polvorín Workshop. The station was opened on 1 July 1914 as the western terminus of the extension of the line from Río de Janeiro. It served as the line's terminus until 23 December 2008, when the line was extended to Carabobo.

== Nearby ==
- Parque Centenario
- Bernardino Rivadavia Natural Sciences Museum
