= San José de Flores (Buenos Aires Underground) =

Buenos Aires Underground station

Coordinates: 34°37′43″S 58°27′52″W

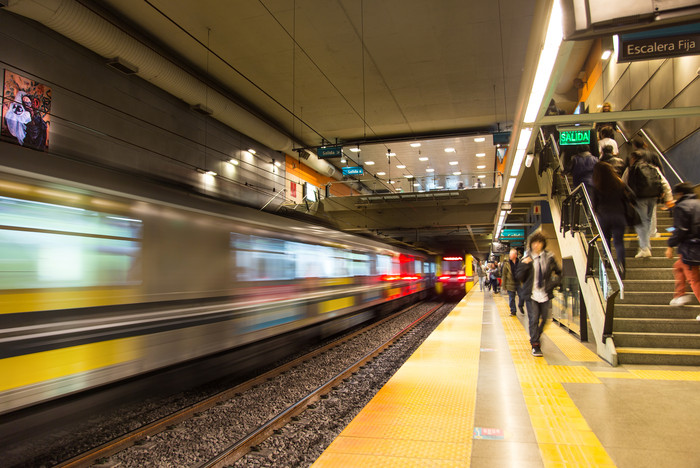

General information
- Location: Av. Rivadavia y Gral. José G. Artigas
- Platforms: Side platforms
- Connections: Sarmiento Line

History
- Opened: 27 September 2013

Services
Preceding station	Buenos Aires Underground	Following station
San Pedrito Terminus	Line A	Carabobo towards Plaza de Mayo
Location

San José de Flores is a station on Line A of the Buenos Aires Underground. The station connects with Flores station on the Sarmiento Line commuter rail service. The station was opened on 27 September 2013 as part of the extension of the line from Carabobo to San Pedrito.

The station is built underneath Plaza General Pueyrredón, commonly known as Plaza Flores. The plaza is adjacent to the Basílica de San José de Flores, from which the station takes its name. The plaza and basilica are considered the central point of the Flores neighborhood.
