= Carabobo (Buenos Aires Underground) =

Buenos Aires Underground station

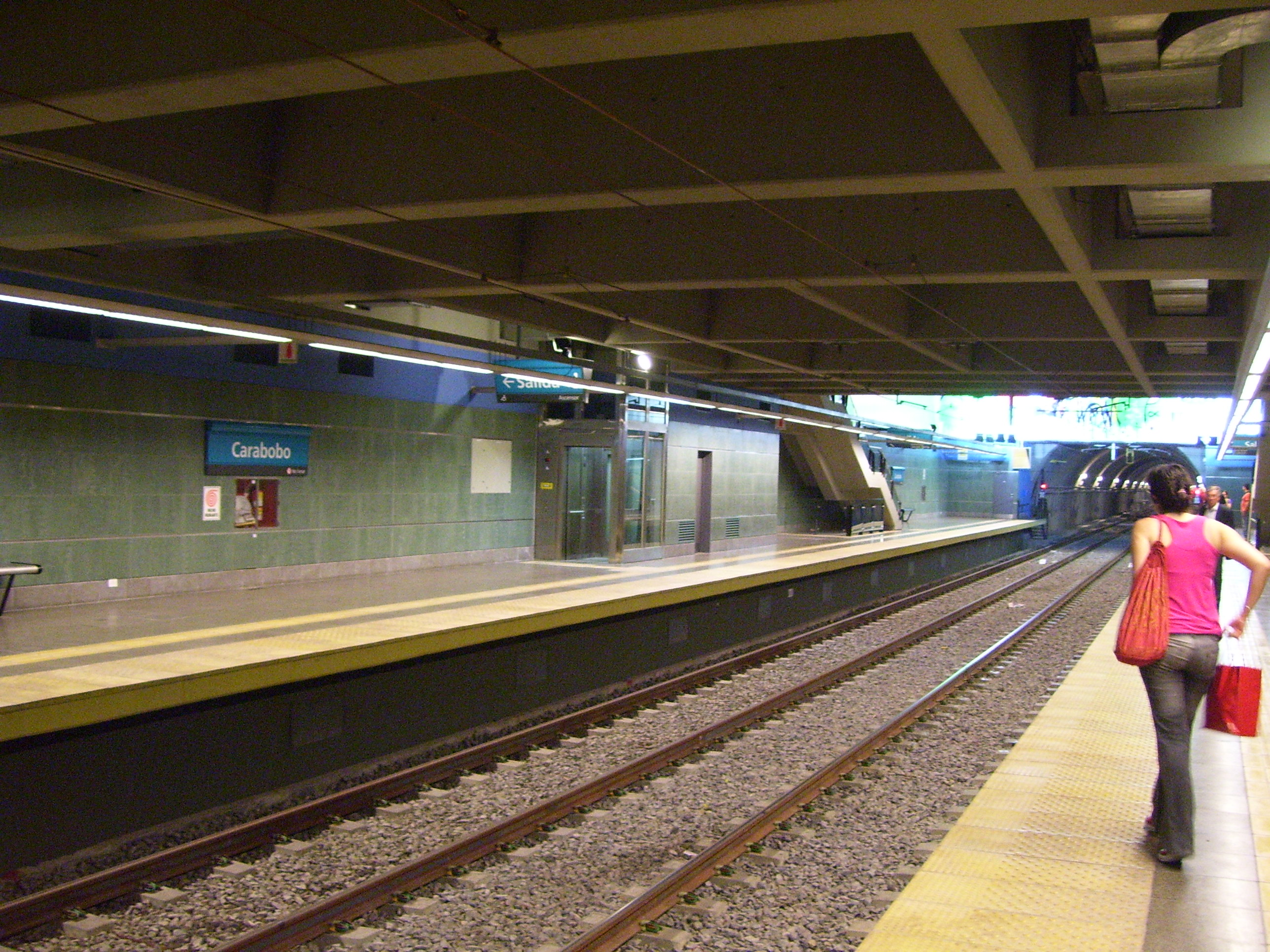

General information
- Location: Av. Rivadavia y Av. Boyacá
- Coordinates: 34°37′35.1″S 58°27′21.9″W
- Platforms: Side platforms

History
- Opened: 23 December 2008

Services
| Preceding station | Buenos Aires Underground | Following station |
|---|---|---|
| San José de Flores towards San Pedrito | Line A | Puán towards Plaza de Mayo |
Location

Carabobo is a station on Line A of the Buenos Aires Underground. It is located at the 6300 block of Rivadavia avenue. It is near the Koreatown of Buenos Aires. The station was opened on 23 December 2008 as the western terminus of the extension of the line from Primera Junta. On 27 September 2013 the line was extended to San Pedrito.

== See also ==
- Carabobo (disambiguation)
