= Perú–Catedral–Bolívar station =

Buenos Aires Underground stations

== Perú ==
Perú
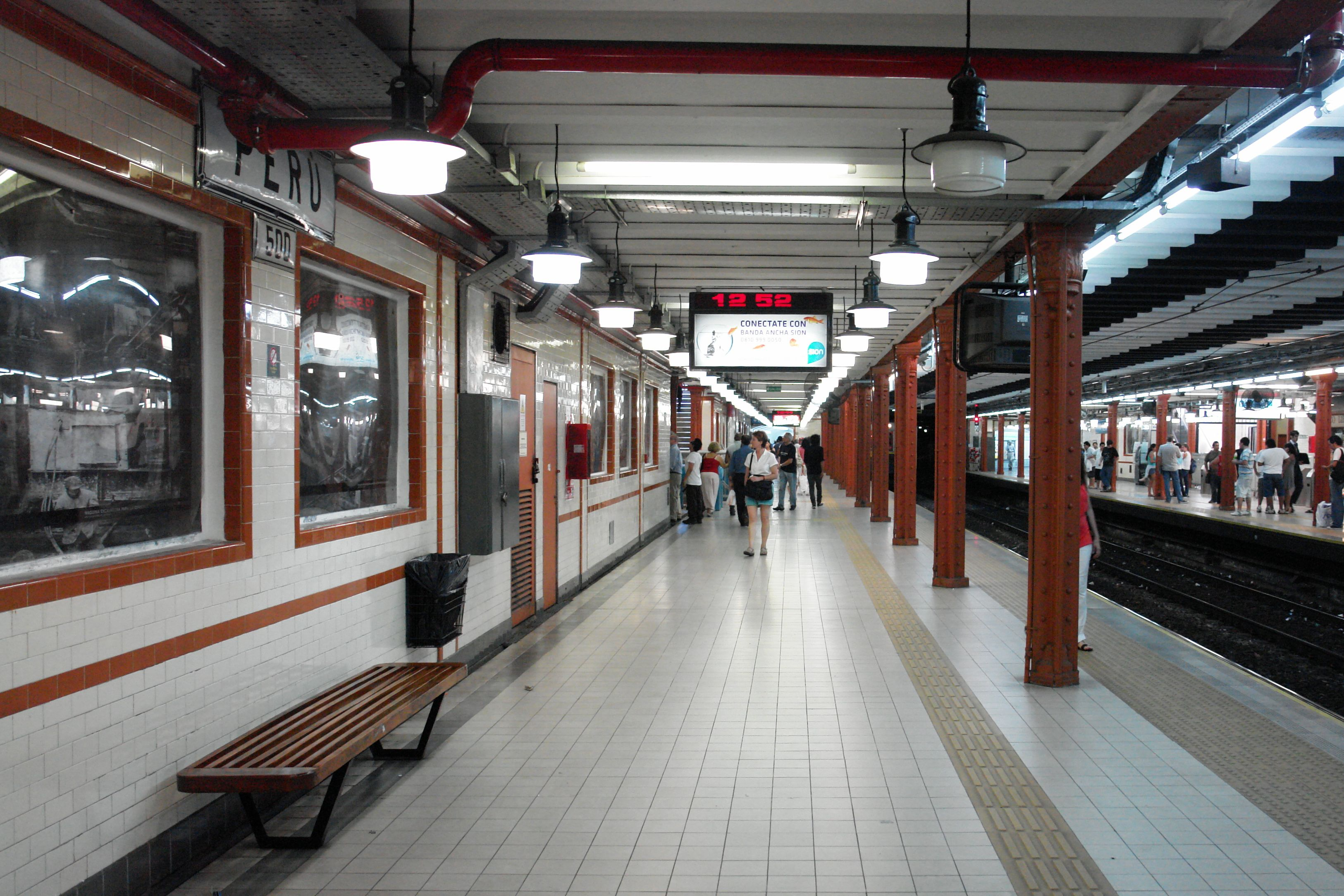

General information
- Location: Avenida de Mayo and Perú
- Coordinates: 34°36′31″S 58°22′28″W
- Platforms: Side platforms

History
- Opened: 1 December 1913

Services
Preceding station	Buenos Aires Underground	Following station
Piedras towards San Pedrito	Line A Transfer to: Catedral; Transfer to: Bolívar	Plaza de Mayo Terminus
Location

Perú is a station on Line A of the Buenos Aires Underground. Passengers may transfer from here to the Catedral Station on Line D and to the Bolívar Station on Line E. This station belonged to the first section of line opened on 1 December 1913, linking the stations Plaza Miserere and Plaza de Mayo. The name corresponds to the street that is above the intersection with Mayo Avenue. In the 1970s it became Argentina's first metro A line equipped with a pair of escalators.

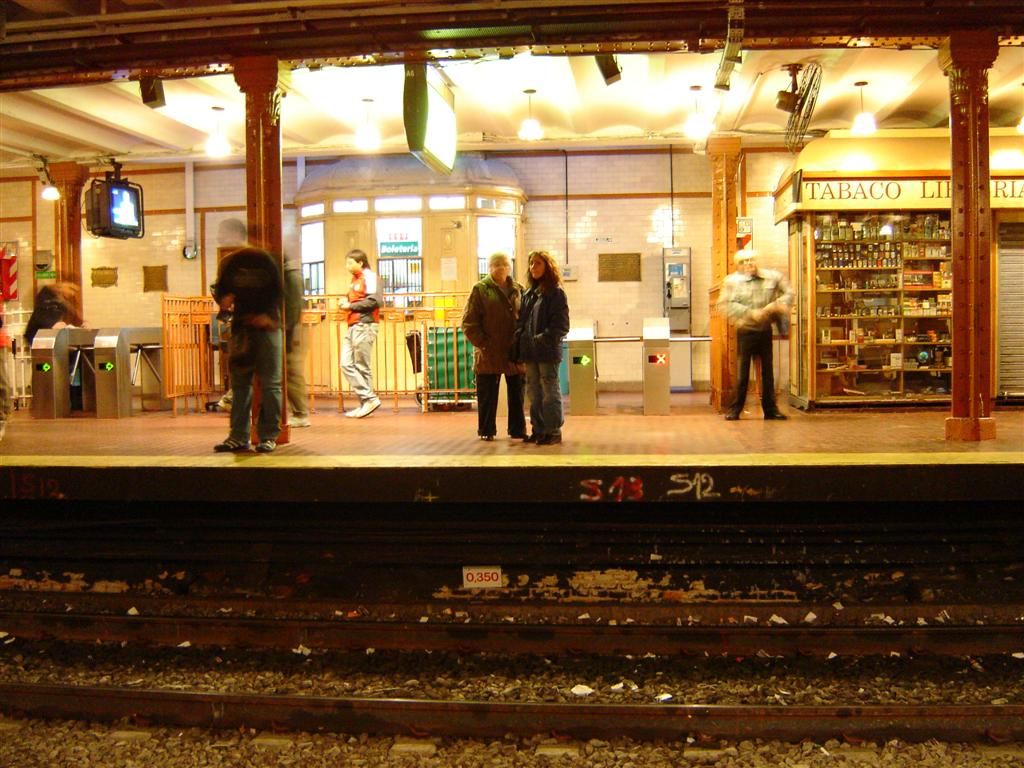

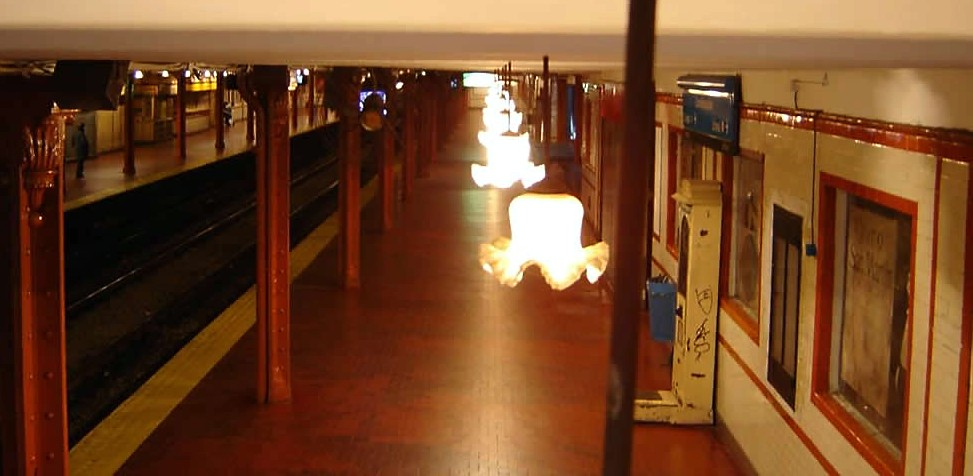

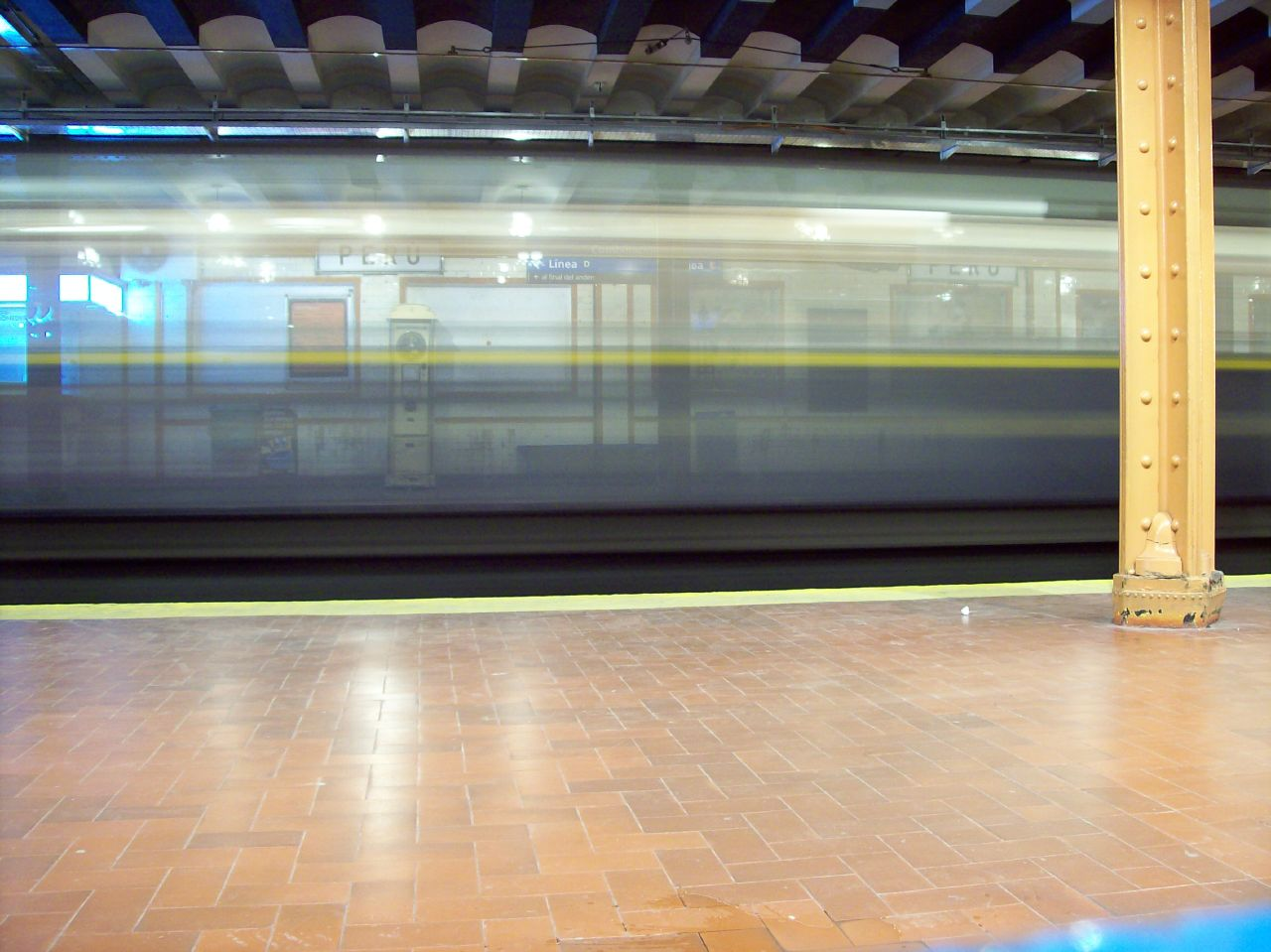

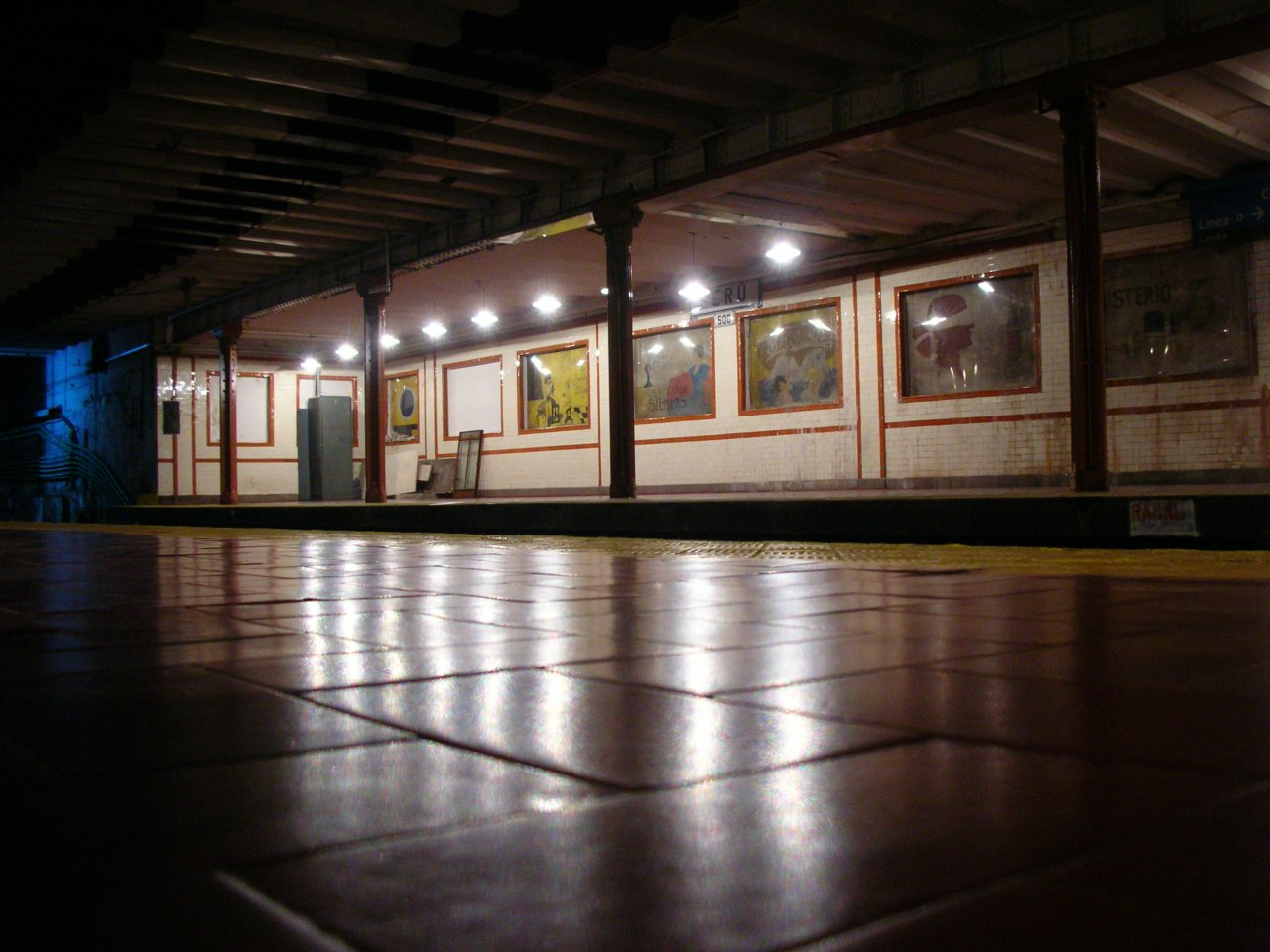

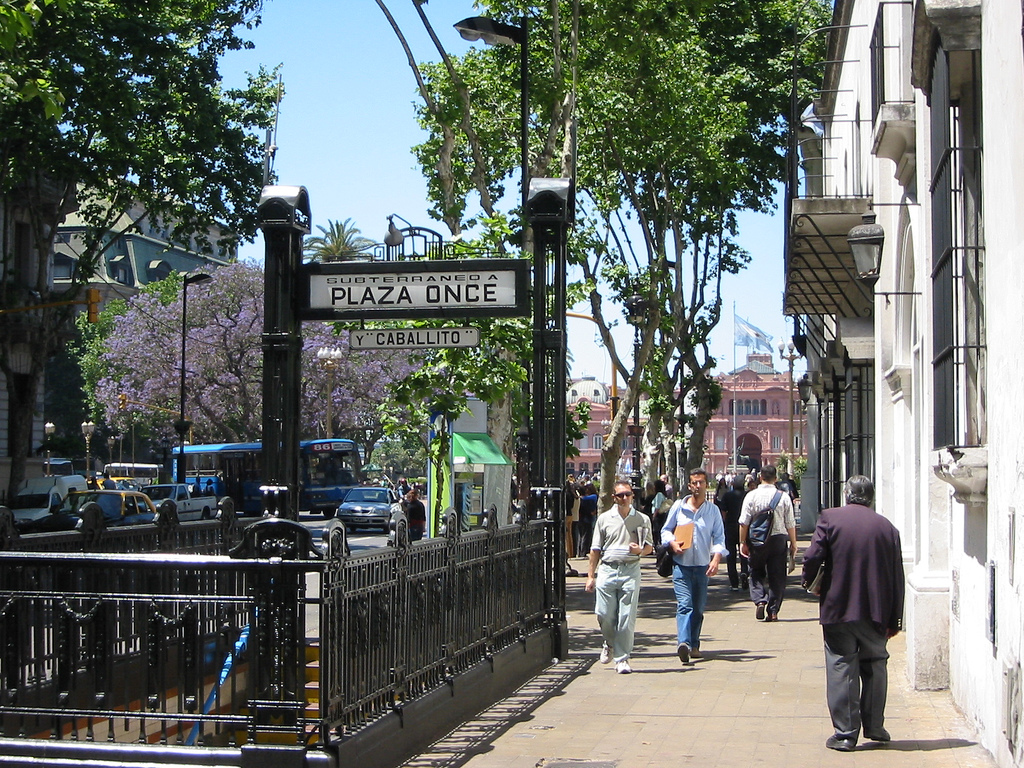

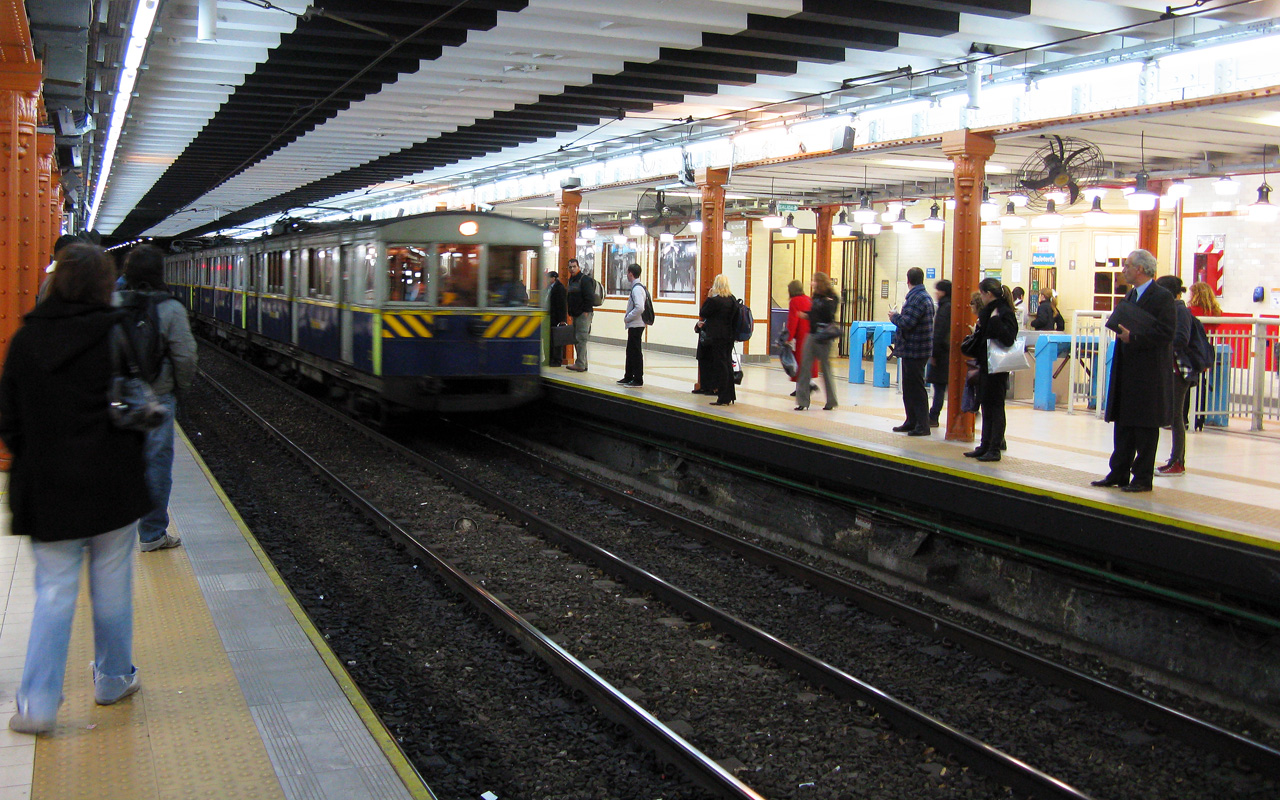

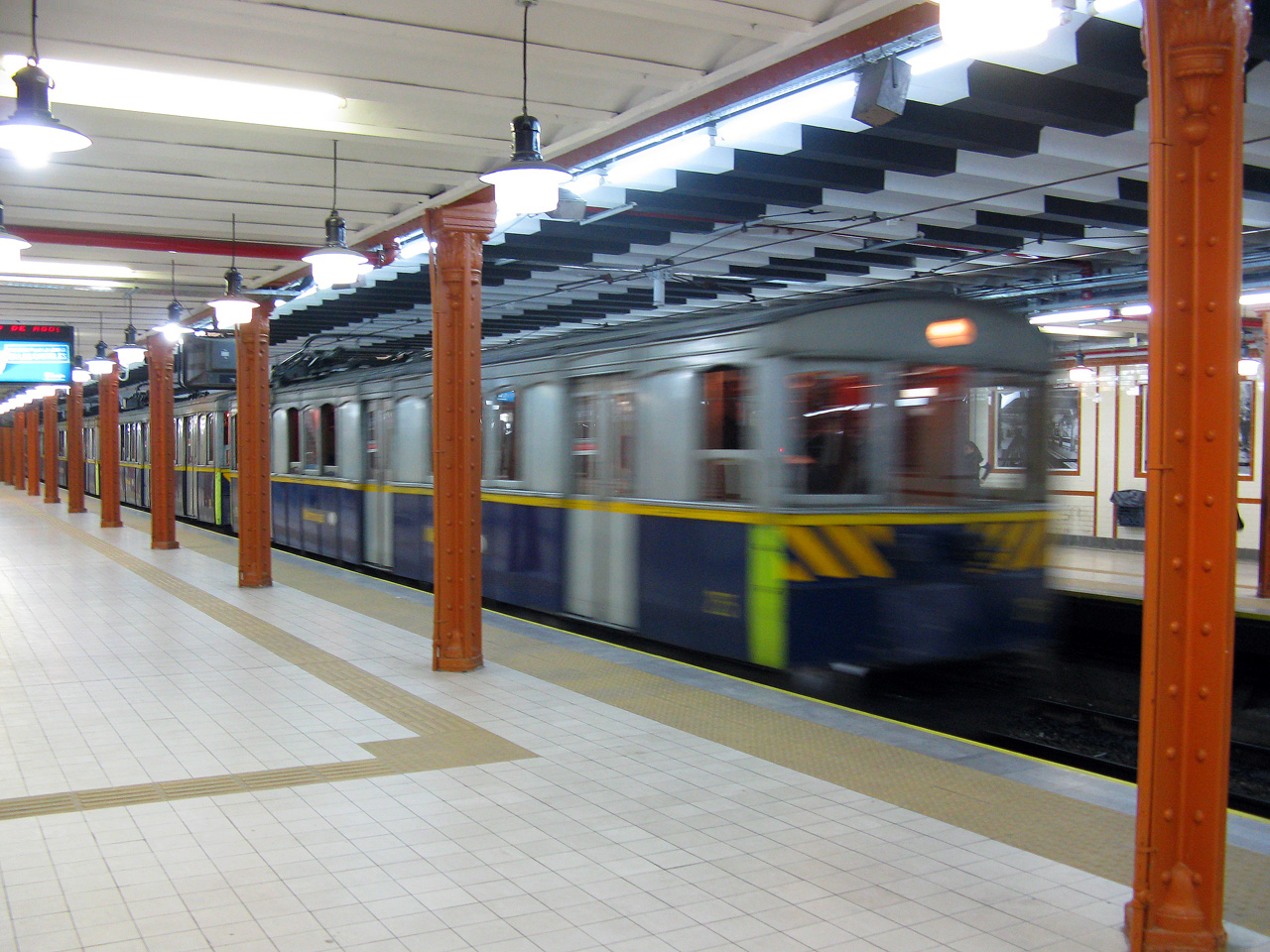

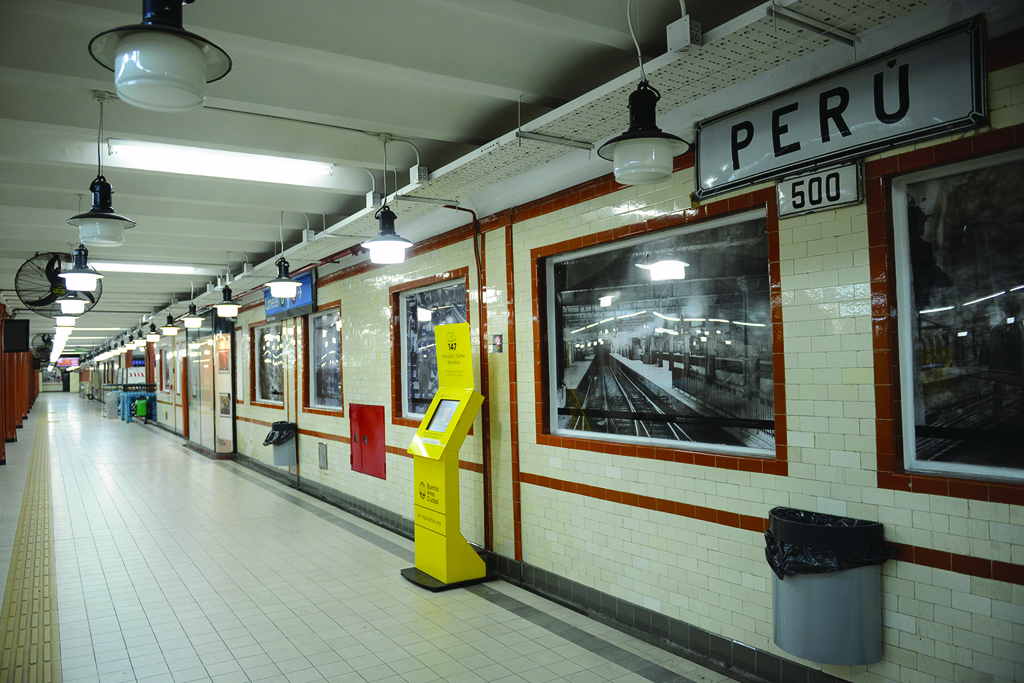

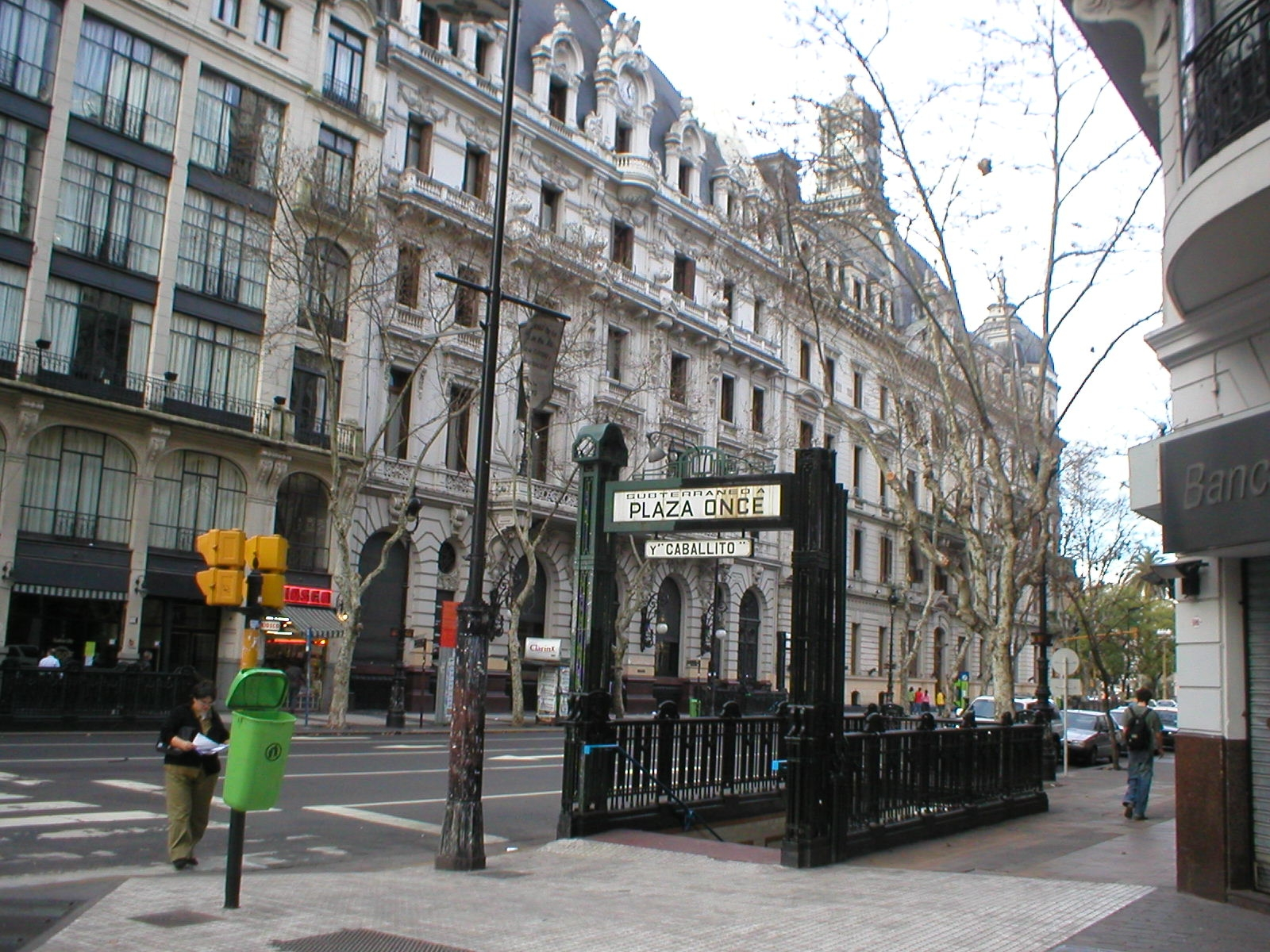

== Catedral ==
Catedral
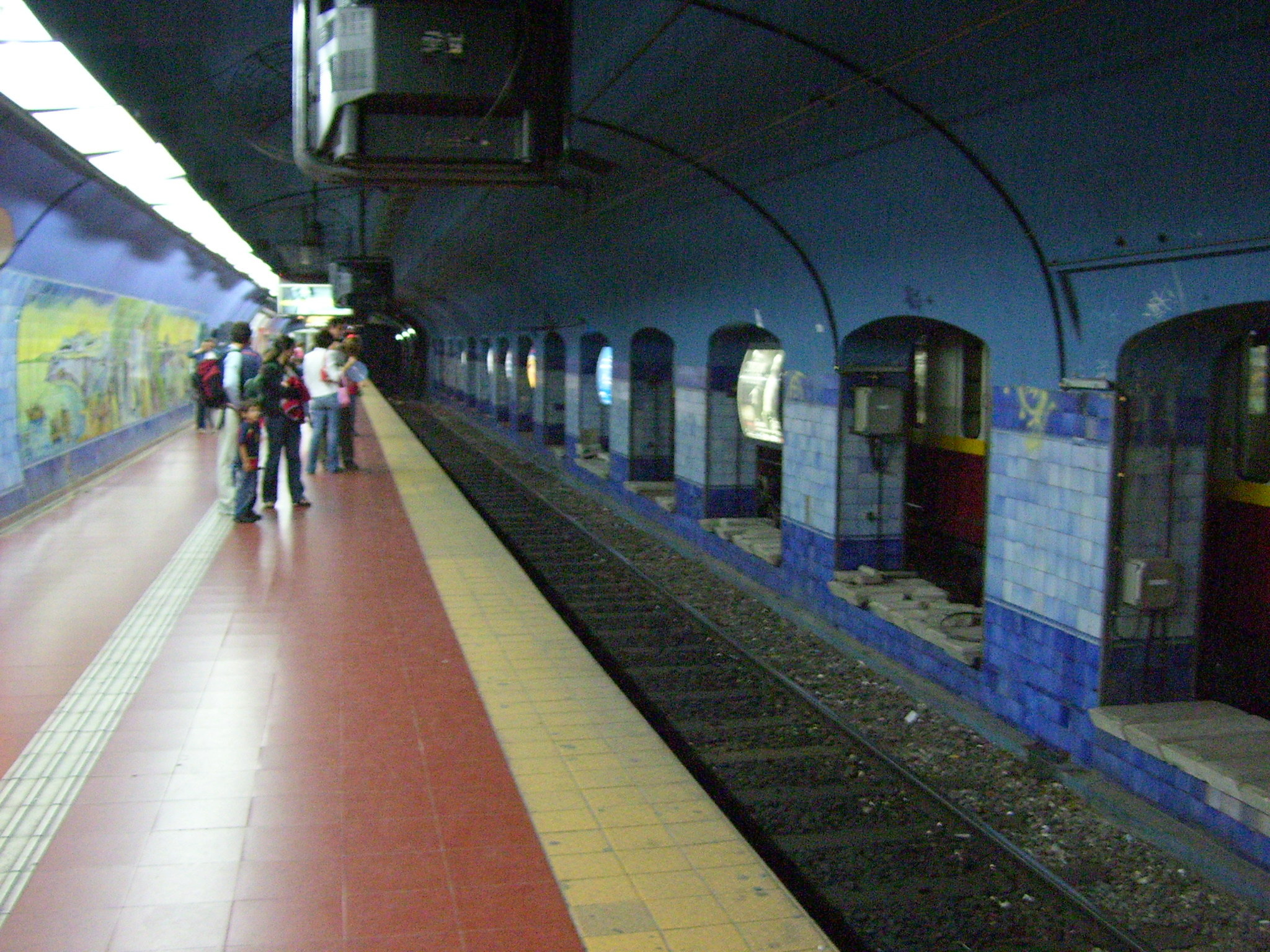

General information
- Location: Av. R. Sáenz Peña between Rivadavia and Florida
- Coordinates: 34°36′27″S 58°22′28″W
- Platforms: Side platforms

History
- Opened: 3 June 1937

Services
Preceding station	Buenos Aires Underground	Following station
9 de Julio towards Congreso de Tucumán	Line D Transfer at: Perú; Transfer to: Bolívar	Terminus
Location

Catedral is a terminal station of the Line D of the Buenos Aires Underground. From here, passengers may transfer to the Perú station on Line A and the Bolívar station on Line E. It is located at the intersection of Roque Sáenz Peña Avenue and Florida Street, which gave the original name of the station. Its current name comes from the Buenos Aires Metropolitan Cathedral, located in the vicinity of the station. This station had the name Florida, as recorded on maps of the network of 1955.

The station was inaugurated on 3 June 1937 as part of the inaugural section of Line D, between Catedral and Tribunales. In 1997 it was declared a national historic monument. The station was used as a set in the 1996 Argentine science fiction film Moebius.

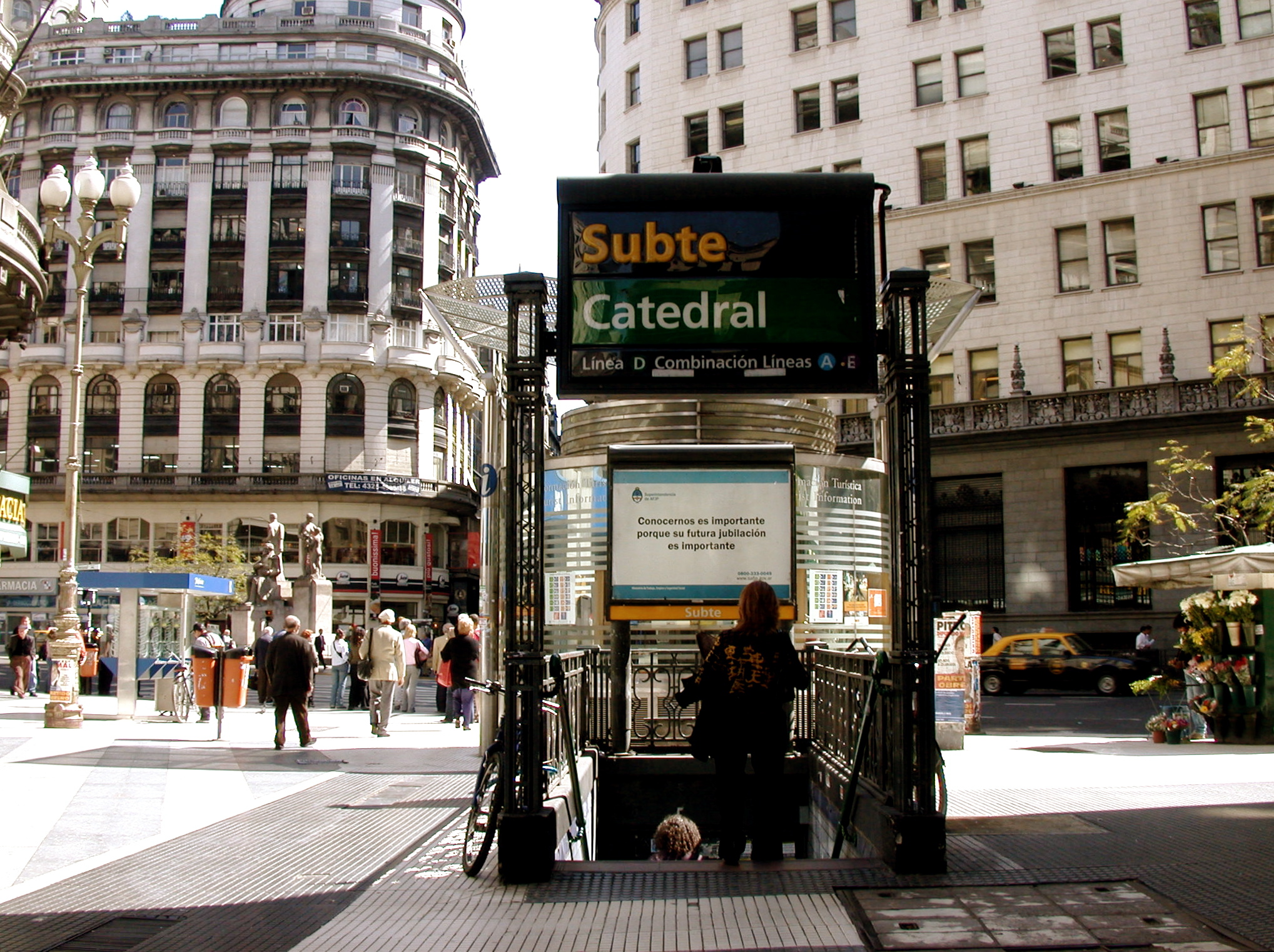
Station entrance

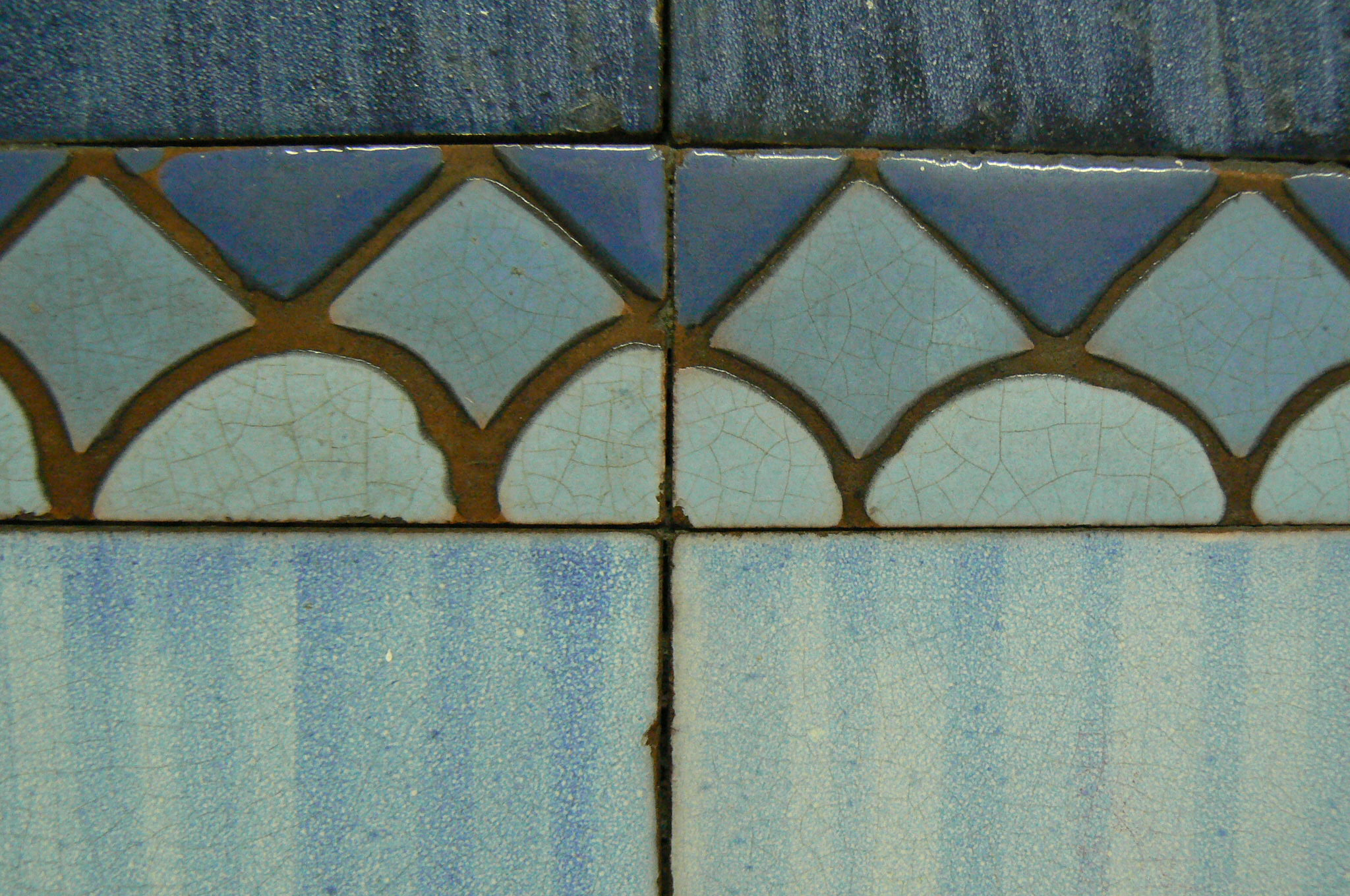
Detail of the majolica

== Bolívar ==
Bolivar
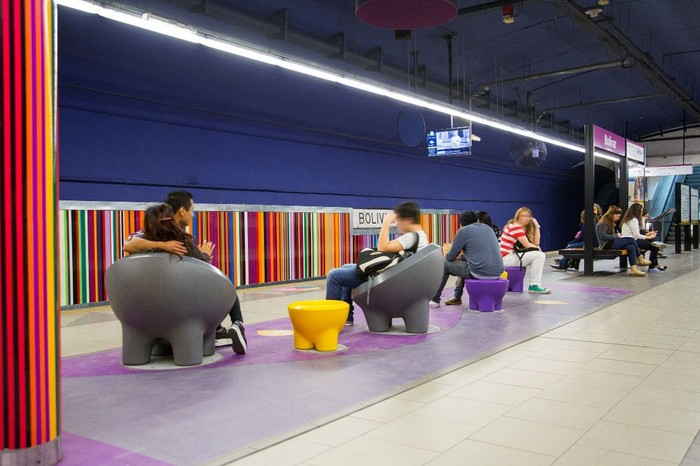

General information
- Location: Buenos Aires; Argentina
- Coordinates: 34°36′35″S 58°22′27″W
- Line: Line E

History
- Opened: 24 April 1966

Services
Preceding station	Buenos Aires Underground	Following station
Belgrano towards Plaza de los Virreyes	Line E Transfer at: Perú; Transfer to: Catedral	Correo Central towards Retiro
Location

Bolívar is a station on Line E of the Buenos Aires Underground at is located on the Diagonal Sur avenue by the Plaza de Mayo. From here, passengers may transfer to the Perú Station on Line A and the Catedral Station on Line D. The station was opened on 24 April 1966 as the eastern terminus of the extension of the line from San José. On 3 June 2019, the line was extended to Retiro.

== See also ==
- Plaza de Mayo
- Florida Street
- Buenos Aires Cabildo
- Avenida de Mayo
