= ARV Carabobo =

ARV Carabobo is the name of the following ships of the Venezuelan Navy, named for the state of Carabobo:

- ARV Carabobo (1945), ex-HMCS Kamsack, a Flower-class corvette acquired in 1945 but wrecked that year during transit to Venezuela
- ARV Carabobo (1972), ex-USS Beatty (DD-756), a Allen M. Sumner-class destroyer acquired in 1972 and stricken in 1981

== See also ==
- Carabobo (disambiguation)
