= Carabobo (disambiguation) =

Carabobo is a state of Venezuela.

Carabobo may also refer to:

== Places ==
- Carabobo Province, established 1824, in Gran Colombia
- Carabobo (Buenos Aires Underground), metro station in Buenos Aires
- Avenida Carabobo, in Buenos Aires City, Argentina

== Other ==
- ARV Carabobo, ships of the Venezuelan Navy
- Batalla de Carabobo (1814), 1st battle of Carabobo
- Battle of Carabobo (1821), 2nd battle of Carabobo
- Carrera Carabobo, in Medellín, Colombia
- Carabobo FC, from Valencia, Venezuela
- University of Carabobo.
