= Line A (Buenos Aires Underground) =

Rapid transit line of Buenos Aires

Line A

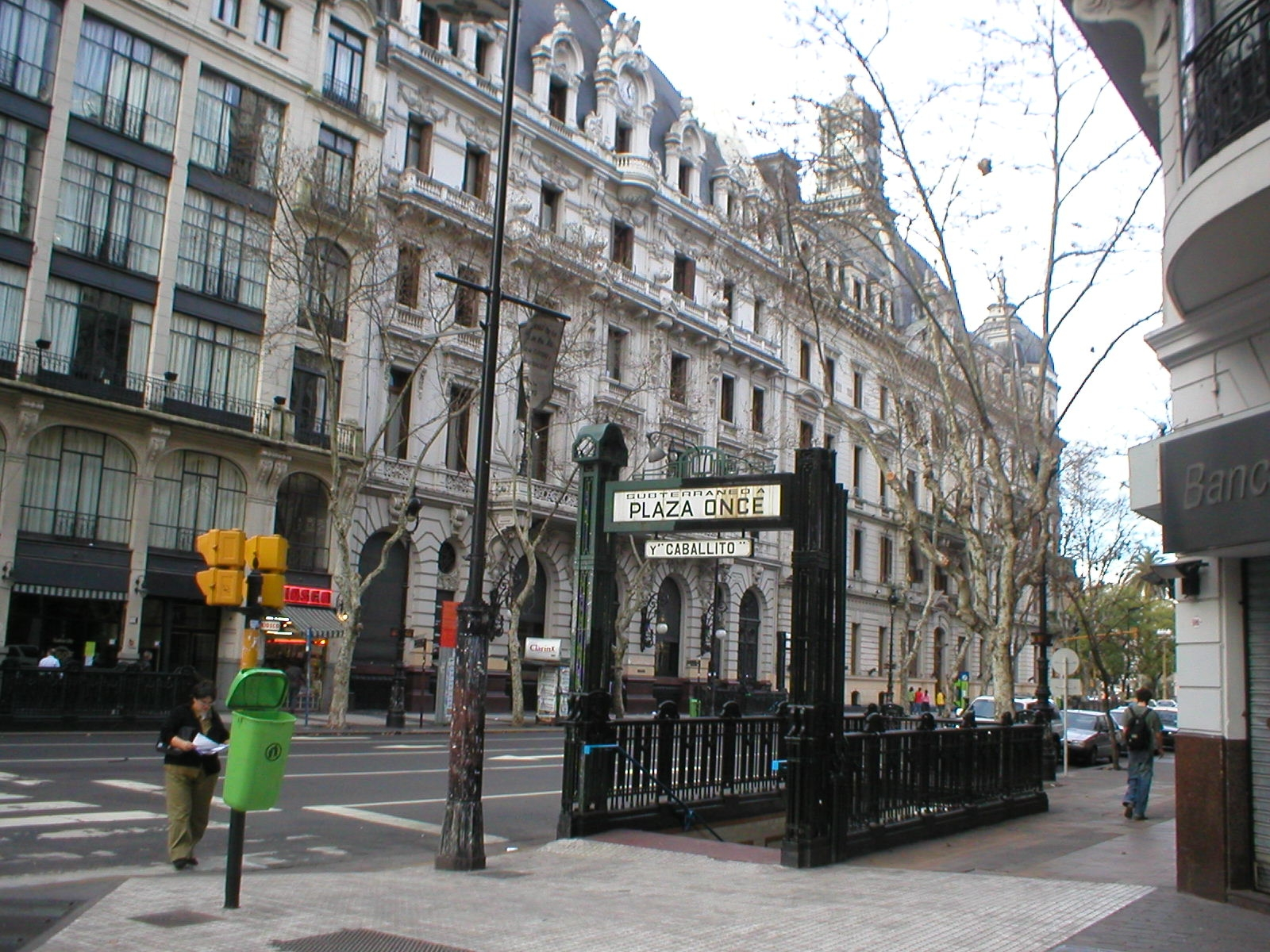
- Entrance to Perú Station

Overview
- Termini: Plaza de Mayo; San Pedrito
- Stations: 16

Service
- Type: Rapid transit
- System: Buenos Aires Underground
- Operator: Emova
- Rolling stock: 200 series
- Daily ridership: 109,964 (2024)

History
- Opened: 1 December 1913; 112 years ago
- Last extension: 2013

Technical
- Line length: 10.8 km (6.7 mi)
- Character: Underground
- Track gauge: 1,435 mm (4 ft 8 1/2 in)
- Electrification: Overhead line, 1,500 V DC

Line A is the oldest line of the Buenos Aires Underground. Opened to the public on 1 December 1913, it was the first underground line in South America, the Southern Hemisphere and the Spanish-speaking world. It made Buenos Aires the 13th city in the world to have an underground transport service. Running under Avenida de Mayo and part of Avenida Rivadavia, the line stretches 9.8 km (6.1 mi) from Plaza de Mayo to San Pedrito, and is used by 258,000 people per day.

On the first day of public service (18 December 1913), it carried 220,000 passengers. Line A used the cars used at its inauguration for just under a century. These cars were built by Belgian company La Brugeoise starting in 1913 and were refurbished in 1927 when their wooden structure was modified for underground-only use.

A peculiarity of the original "pantograph" cars on the "underground tramway" was that until 1926 they had both low doors at the ends for boarding from the street and high doors in the middle for loading from platforms in the tunnel. For this reason, Line A might also be considered the continent's first "light rail subway". The old wooden cars were removed in 2013, and replaced by modern cars.

The line has been extended twice since the completion of the original line in 1914, with the most recent two-station extension of San José de Flores and San Pedrito entering service on 27 September 2013.

== History ==
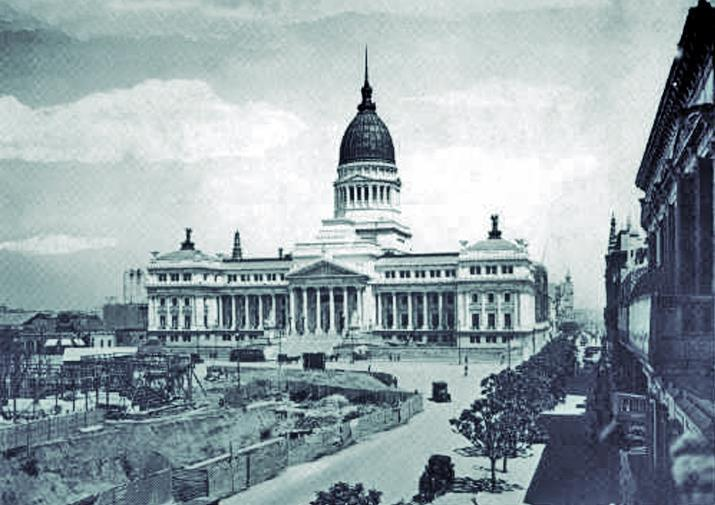
Congreso station being built in front of the National Congress

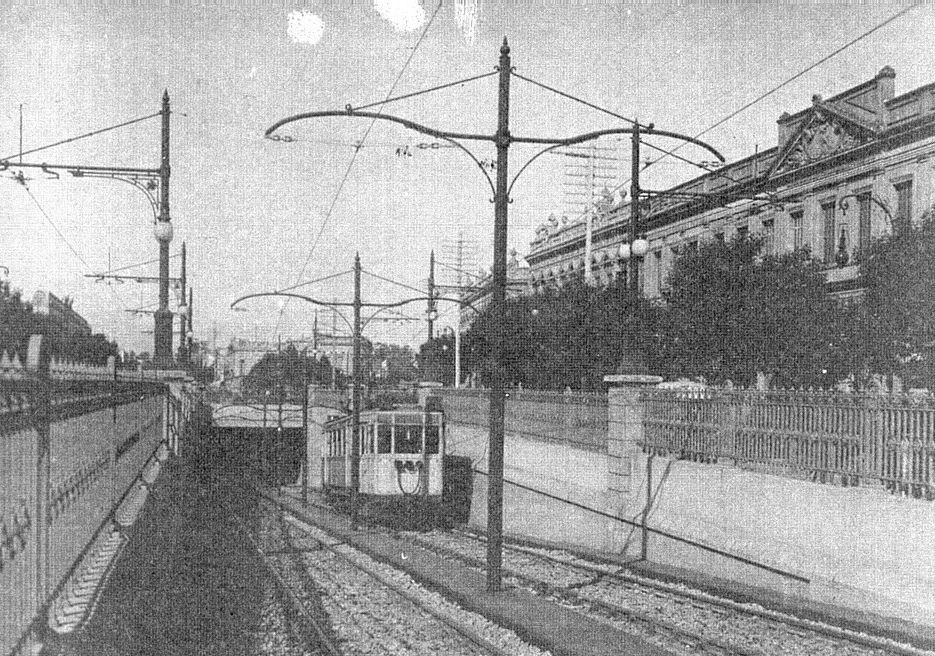
Tram leaving the underground and continuing above ground in Caballito (1913)

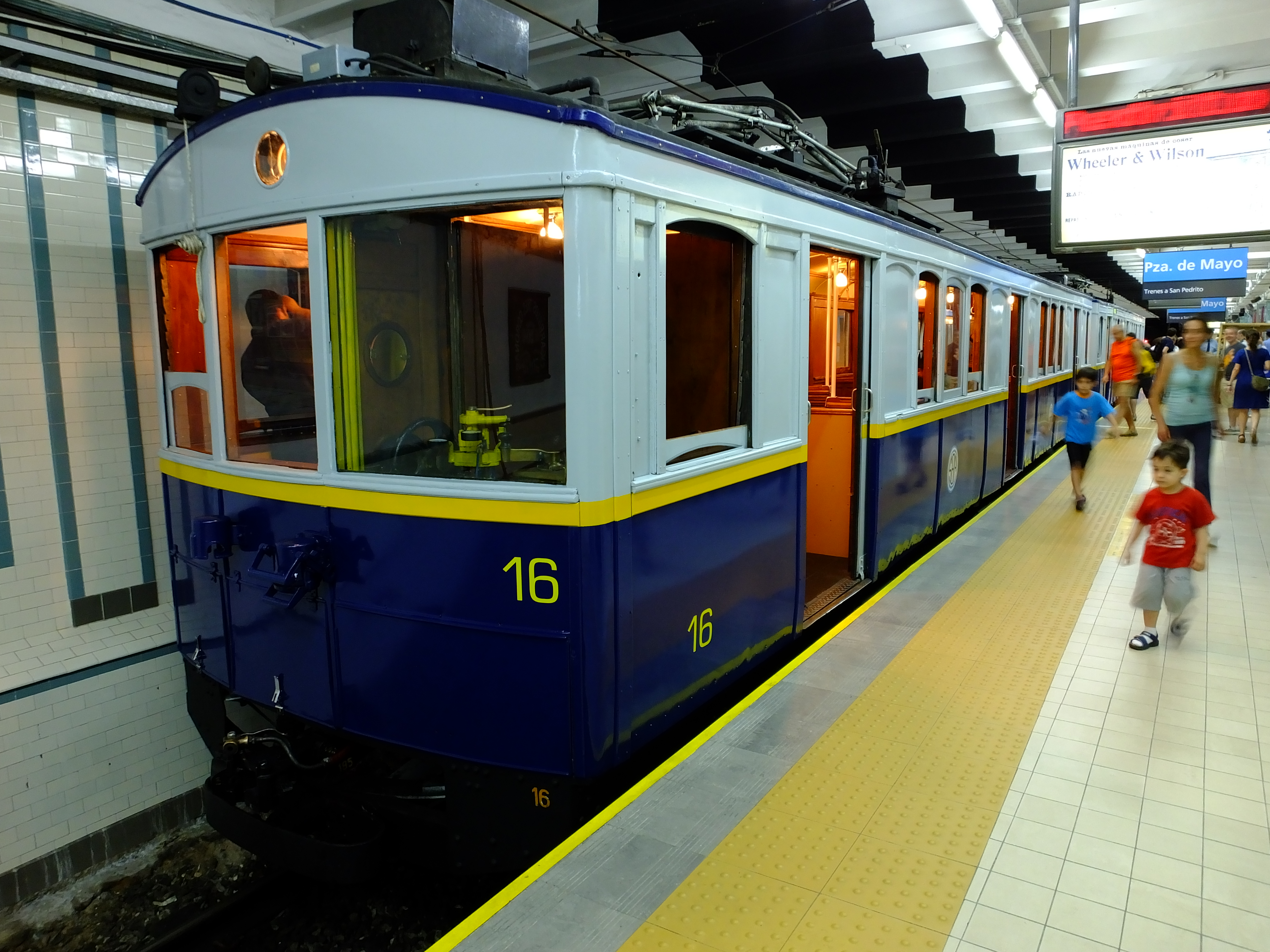
La Brugeoise car at Plaza de Mayo, brought out of retirement briefly to celebrate the 100-year anniversary of the line

During the first decade of the 20th century in Buenos Aires, road traffic had sharply increased due to a growing population. In 1903 the city had 895,381 inhabitants and there were 4,791 horse-drawn carriages and 60 cars, while by 1913 there were 1,457,885 people, with 6,211 carriages and 7,438 automobiles.

Because it was necessary to create new forms of mass transit, in 1909 the Congress awarded Ferrocarril del Oeste (FCO) (Buenos Aires Western Railway) a concession to build a two-way underground railway that would join the main route of the Buenos Aires Western Railway (currently the Sarmiento Railway) at Once railway station, near Sadi Carnot Street (now Mario Bravo) with the port. However, on 28 December 1909 the Municipality of the City of Buenos Aires gave a concession to the Anglo-Argentine Tramways Company (AATC), which operated 80% of Buenos Aires' tram system at the time (making it perhaps the largest in the world) to build an underground passenger rail service.

After a dispute, it was agreed that the Western Railway would use the line for freight, but only on one track in a manner that would allow the passage of the AATC passenger line. Thus, construction of the Anglo-Argentine Line began on 15 September 1911, with the German company Philipp Holzmann & Cia as contractor. The construction of this line involved hiring 1,500 workers and used 31 million bricks, 108,000 170-kilogram (370 lb) bags of cement, 13,000 metric tons (14,000 short tons) of iron braces, and 90,000 square metres (970,000 ft^{2}) of insulating material. The total investment to build the line was m$n17 million. m$n 3 million was invested in the excavation of the tunnel, m$n 7 million in construction, m$n 2.5 million in the initial 50 trains and m$n 2 million for the Polvorín Workshop.

Plaza de Mayo
Perú
Piedras
Lima
Sáenz Peña
Congreso
Pasco
Alberti
Plaza Miserere
Colour of the friezes in 1913

The Plaza de Mayo-Plaza Miserere section was inaugurated on 1 December 1913. On the following day it opened to the public, carrying 220,000 passengers. It was the first underground railway in South America, the Southern Hemisphere and the Spanish speaking world. Buenos Aires thus became the 13th city in the world to have an underground railway, behind London, Athens, Istanbul, Vienna, Budapest, Glasgow, Paris, Boston, Berlin, New York, Philadelphia, and Hamburg. Each station was 100 m (330 ft) in length and had friezes of specific colours for easy identification.

The construction of the Plaza Miserere station was carried out by two companies, AACT and FCO. At that time the station had two tracks for the railway in the middle, and two pairs of lines for the underground, which were on the laterals. The outside southern track of the subway was eliminated in 1926 and it was decided to extend the platform to make the rail-underground transfer more convenient.

The route was extended to Río de Janeiro Station on 1 April 1914 and on 14 July of that year to Caballito, renamed Primera Junta station in 1923. Beyond Primera Junta a ramp was built in 1915 in the centre of Rivadavia Avenue between Cachimayo and Emilio Mitre streets, for trains to access the Polvorín Workshop on Emilio Mitre and José Bonifacio streets, covering a surface loop shared with tram traffic until 1963. This 2 km (1.2 mi) route has been used since 1980 by the Asociación Amigos del Tranvía (Association of Friends of the Tram) to run the Buenos Aires Historical Tramway. The ramp had originally taken passengers to the surface at the intersection of Lacarra and Rivadavia Avenues where trains continued to run at street level, a service that ceased on 31 December 1926.

=== Recent developments ===
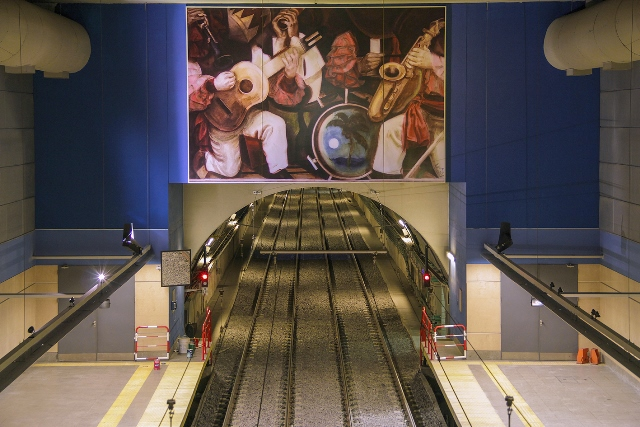
San José de Flores station, opened in 2013

In 1997 the Plaza Miserere station was declared a national historic monument. Over the years, most stations on the line have also been declared part of the national patrimony of Argentina and are thus protected. Unlike other lines, the original stations preserve much of their original appearance and many stations have also been restored or feature exhibits which show the history of the line.

In the first expansion of the line since 1914, Puán and Carabobo stations were opened in December 2008. As part of the opening ceremony for the two stations, Buenos Aires Mayor Mauricio Macri drove one of the La Brugeoise trains. Later in September 2013, the San José de Flores and San Pedrito stations were opened, bringing the length of the line up to 9.8 km (6.1 mi) and the total number of stations to 18, while adding an additional 35,000 passengers per day to the line. That same year, the line was also converted from 1100 volts to 1500 volts to match the rest of the network.

=== Chronology ===
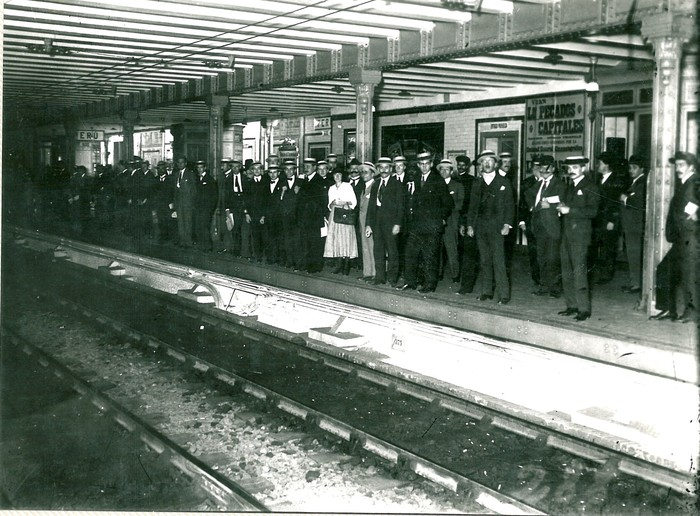
Passengers waiting at Perú station platforms (early 1900s)

- 1 December 1913 – the Line is inaugurated between Plaza de Mayo and Plaza Miserere.
- 1 April 1914 – extended to Río de Janeiro.
- 1 July 1914 – extended to Caballito (renamed to Primera Junta in 1923).
- 9 November 1934 – Line C built, creating a new connection at Lima station.
- 3 June 1937 – Line D built, creating a new connection at Perú station.
- 17 February 1939 – the line obtained its current name, Line A.
- 1953 – Pasco Sur and Alberti Norte were closed, leaving Pasco and Alberti with just one platform each.
- 24 April 1966 – Line E extended to Bolívar, creating another connection at Perú station.
- 18 October 2007 – Line H built, creating a new connection at Plaza Miserere
- 22 December 2008 – Line A extended to Carabobo.
- 27 September 2013 – Line A extended to San Pedrito.

== Rolling stock ==
=== 1913–2013 ===
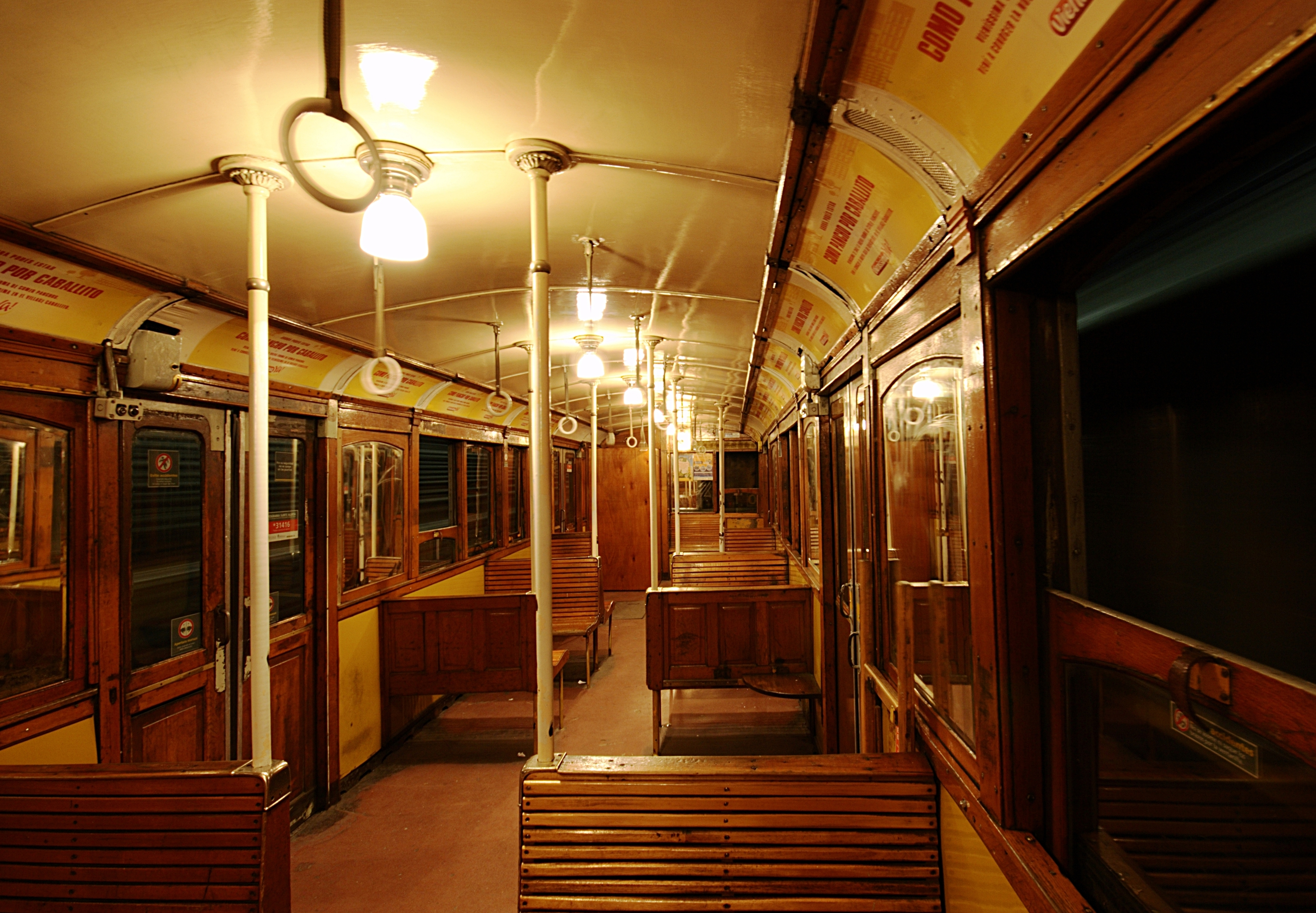
Interior of a La Brugeoise car, used up to 2013

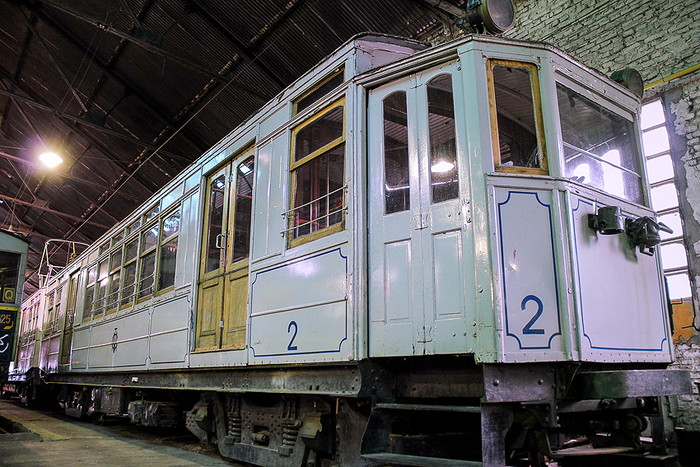
One of the surviving 3 UEC Preston cars at the Polvorín Workshop

While the line was under construction, the Anglo-Argentine Tramways Company took bids from two companies to provide the rolling stock for the line: the Belgian company La Brugeoise et Nicaise et Delcuve and the British United Electric Car Company. The tram models presented by the respective companies were the La Brugeoise cars and the UEC Preston cars.

The latter was noted for its extravagant interior design, featuring exotic materials and UEC sent four of these trams to Buenos Aires for the AATC's consideration. Ultimately, the company chose to go with the Belgian trams and 125 of them were built to serve the line, although the four Preston trams were also kept to serve on the line. In 1927, the trams were converted to underground cars following the line's extension underground and abandonment of its overground segment.

The UEC Preston cars ended service in 1977 and the three remaining cars are today used on the Buenos Aires Heritage Tramway and also for special occasions on Line A of the underground, such as during its 100-year anniversary. The Brugeoise cars remained in service until 2013, though numerous attempts over the years were made to either modernise the fleet (as was done with a few cars modernised by the Emepa Group in the 1980s) or replace the rolling stock completely. One such attempt to replace the rolling stock was with the purchase of 96 Alstom Metropolis cars in 2001, however these were ultimately assigned to Line D instead of Line A.

After 96 years of continuous service, the La Brugeoise cars were nearing their final withdrawal from service in 2009. Spare parts for these trains were no longer available on the market so they had to be custom-made by request at Polvorín Workshop, where La Brugeoise units and other Buenos Aires Underground rolling stock were maintained and repaired by highly skilled and qualified personnel. At this point, it was already being discussed that these surviving vintage cars could continue operating as a tourist attraction on holidays and Sundays.

According to Metrovías, the Buenos Aires Underground private operator, the La Brugeoise cars underwent a routine check-up every 20 days, while every four years heavy maintenance was performed. Despite their many years of uninterrupted service, La Brugeoise trains had one of the lowest mechanical failure averages in the network: 19 every 100,000 km.

=== 2013–present ===
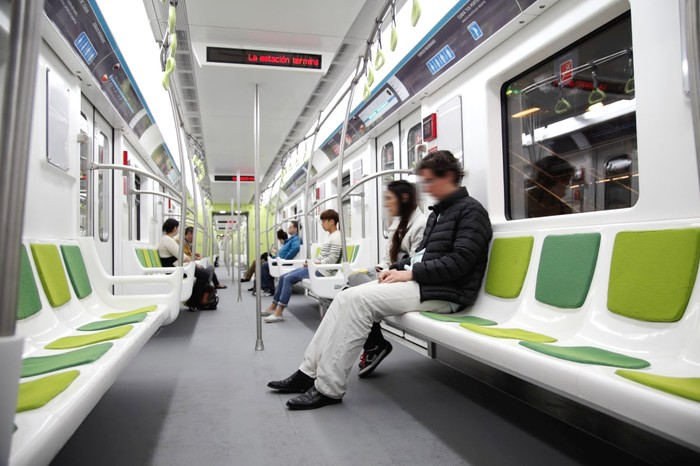
Interior of the 200 Series rolling stock, used from 2013 onwards

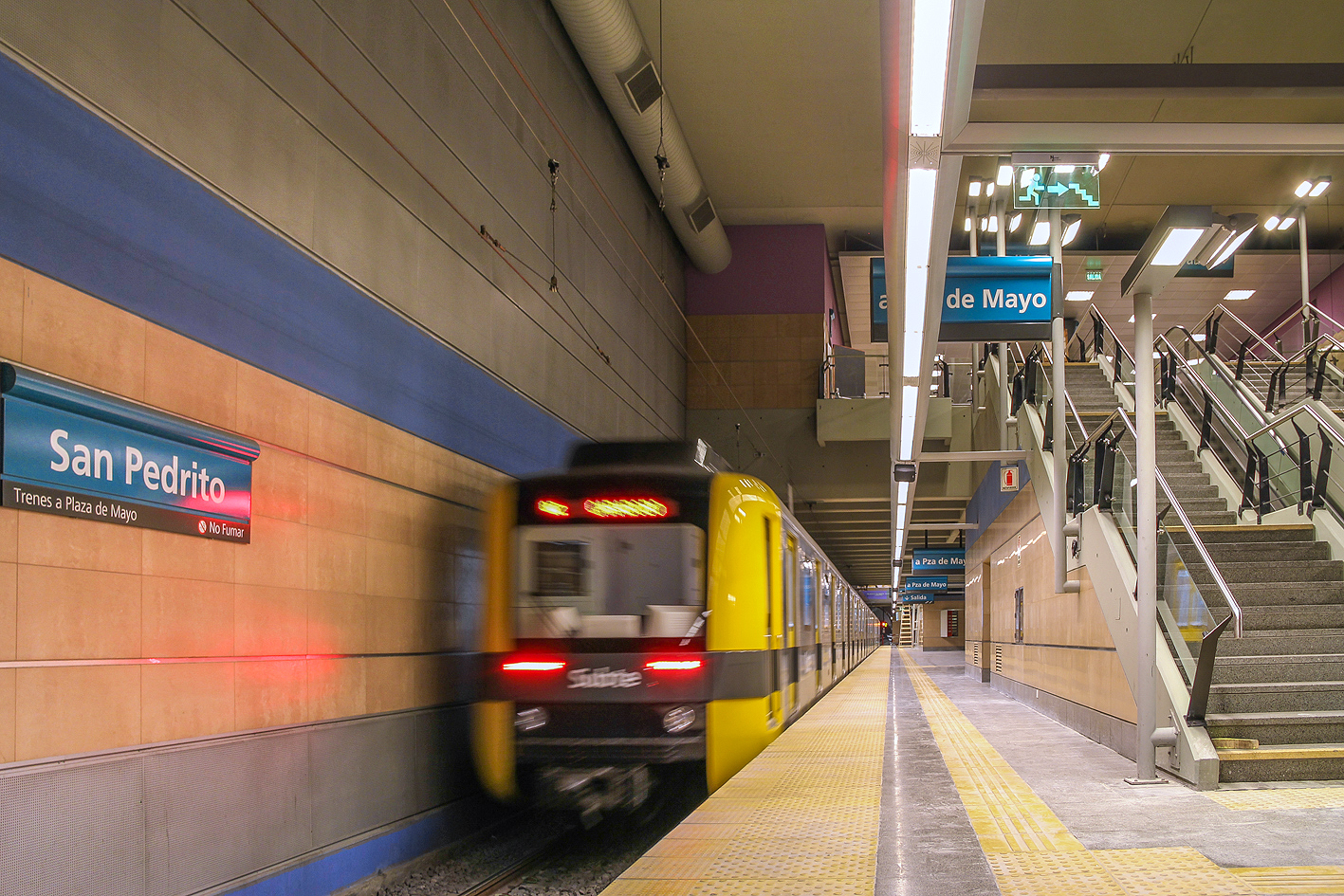
CNR train at San Pedrito

By 2013, after nearly 100 years of continuous service, the Brugeoise cars were definitively withdrawn from service on January 12, 2013, 11 months before their 100th anniversary. They were replaced by new CNR rolling stock, which has been slowly introduced as units arrive from China. The original rolling stock has since been maintained, some in exhibition and some being converted to 1500 V to run tourist services on the line. In December 2013 a law was passed which meant that the entire La Brugeoise fleet would receive protection status and would thus only be donated to organisations dedicated to their restoration and preservation.

The 45 200 Series CNR cars which arrived in 2013 were not sufficient to cover the entire fleet of the line, so it had to be supplemented by a temporary fleet of 35 Fiat-Materfer cars, which was still not enough to replace the 120 La Brugeoise units. Some additional refurbished Siemens-Schuckert Orenstein & Koppel trains were added to the temporary fleet in addition to the Materfer trains. However, the replacement of the rolling stock coincided with the opening of the San José de Flores and San Pedrito stations, so the line was still left with insufficient rolling stock causing a decline in passenger numbers.

In the meantime, a further 105 200 Series cars were ordered from China so that the line would be served in its entirety by 150 of these cars. This mean that the Siemens O&K cars could be completely retired from service and the Materfer cars moved to Line E in time for its extension to Retiro. These cars steadily arrived in Argentina from 2015 and were incorporated into the line in order to deal with the declines in frequency and passenger numbers since the retirement of the La Brugeoise cars. The last of the CNR units arrived during 2016 and 2017, by which time Line A's rolling stock consisted entirely of the 200 Series.

== Ghost stations ==
Two ghost stations exist on the line. These are Alberti Norte and Pasco Sur, which were closed in 1953. Both these stations had a single platform which allowed boarding trains only towards a single direction, while their opposite platforms (located close to each of the ghost stations) remain open as Alberti and Pasco.

== Gallery ==
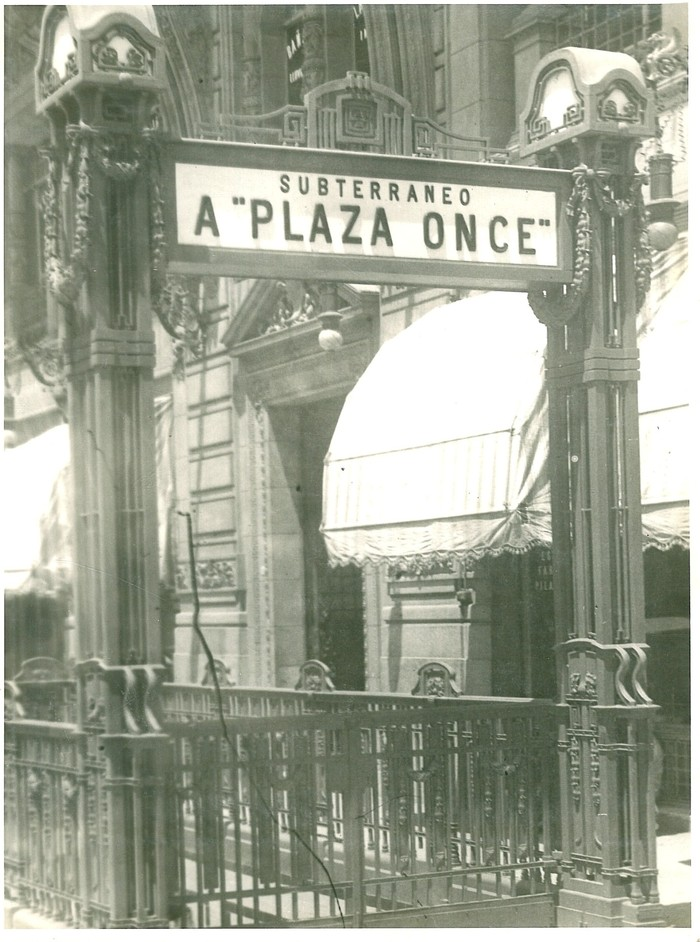
One of the original entrances to the line

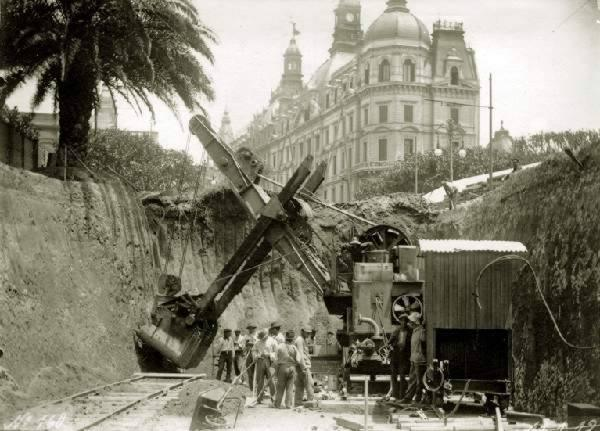
Construction works (c.1912)

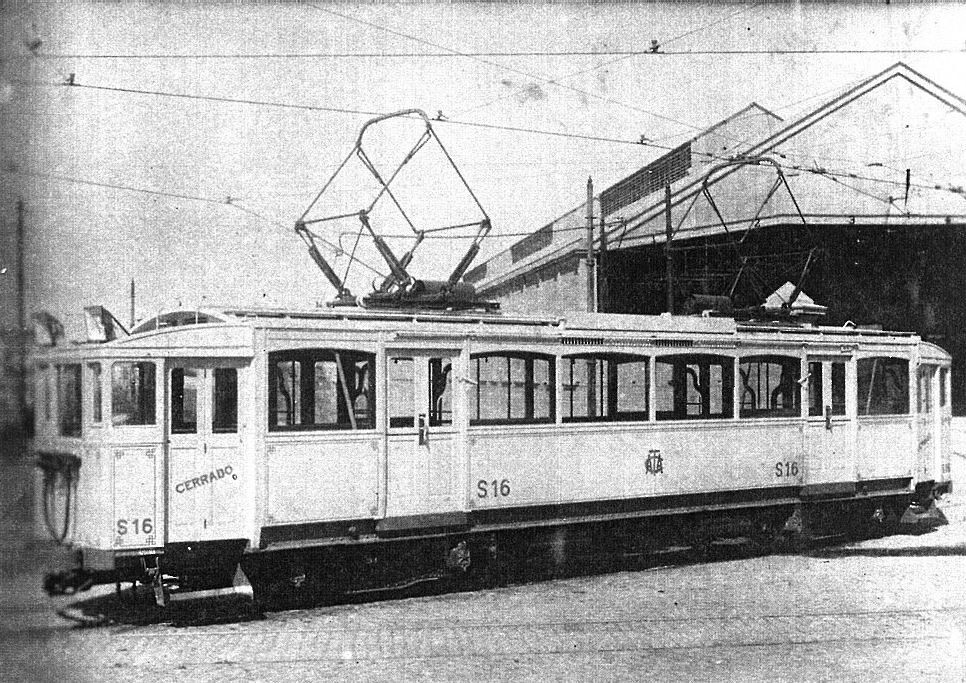
La Brugoise car before conversion

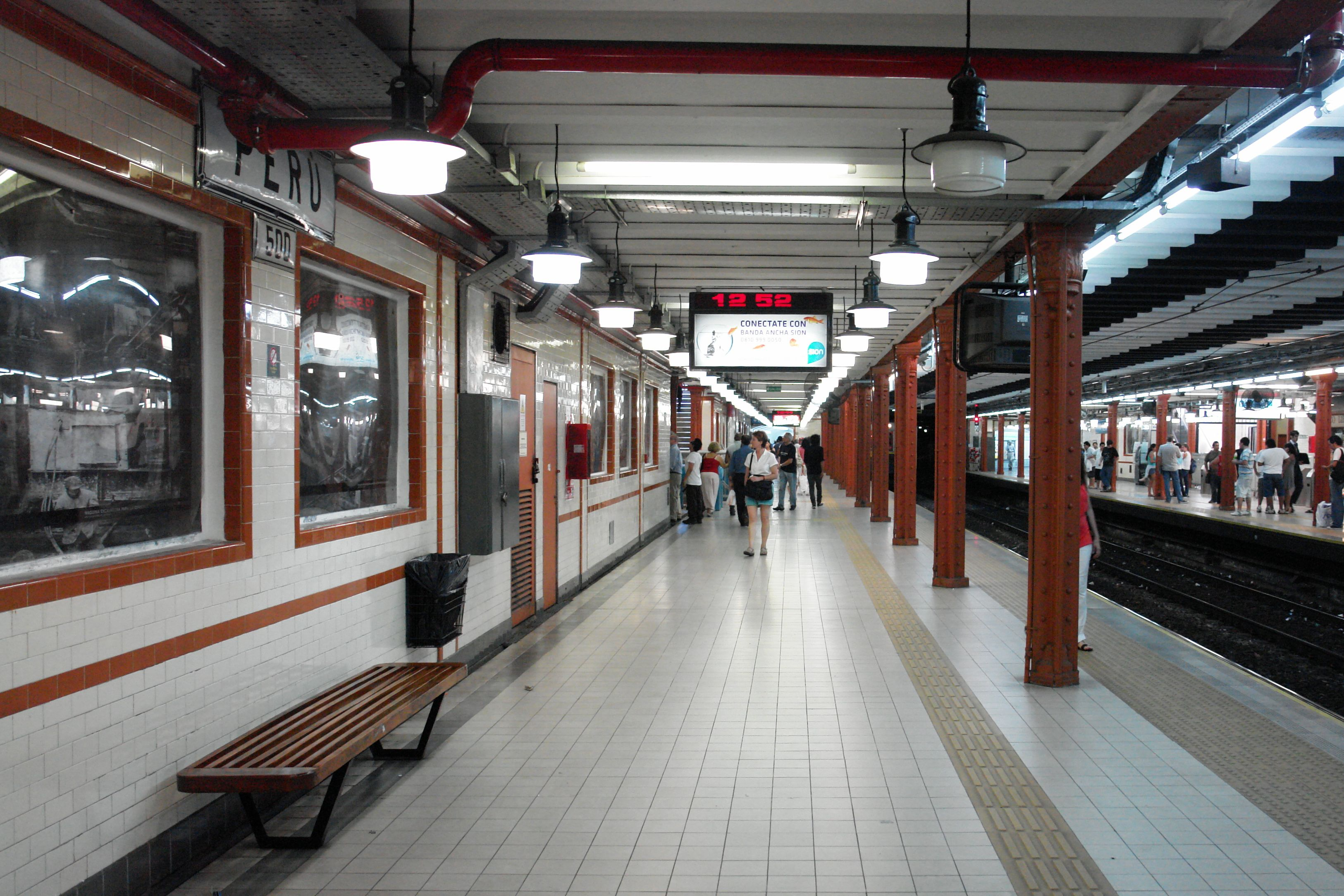
Peru station interior

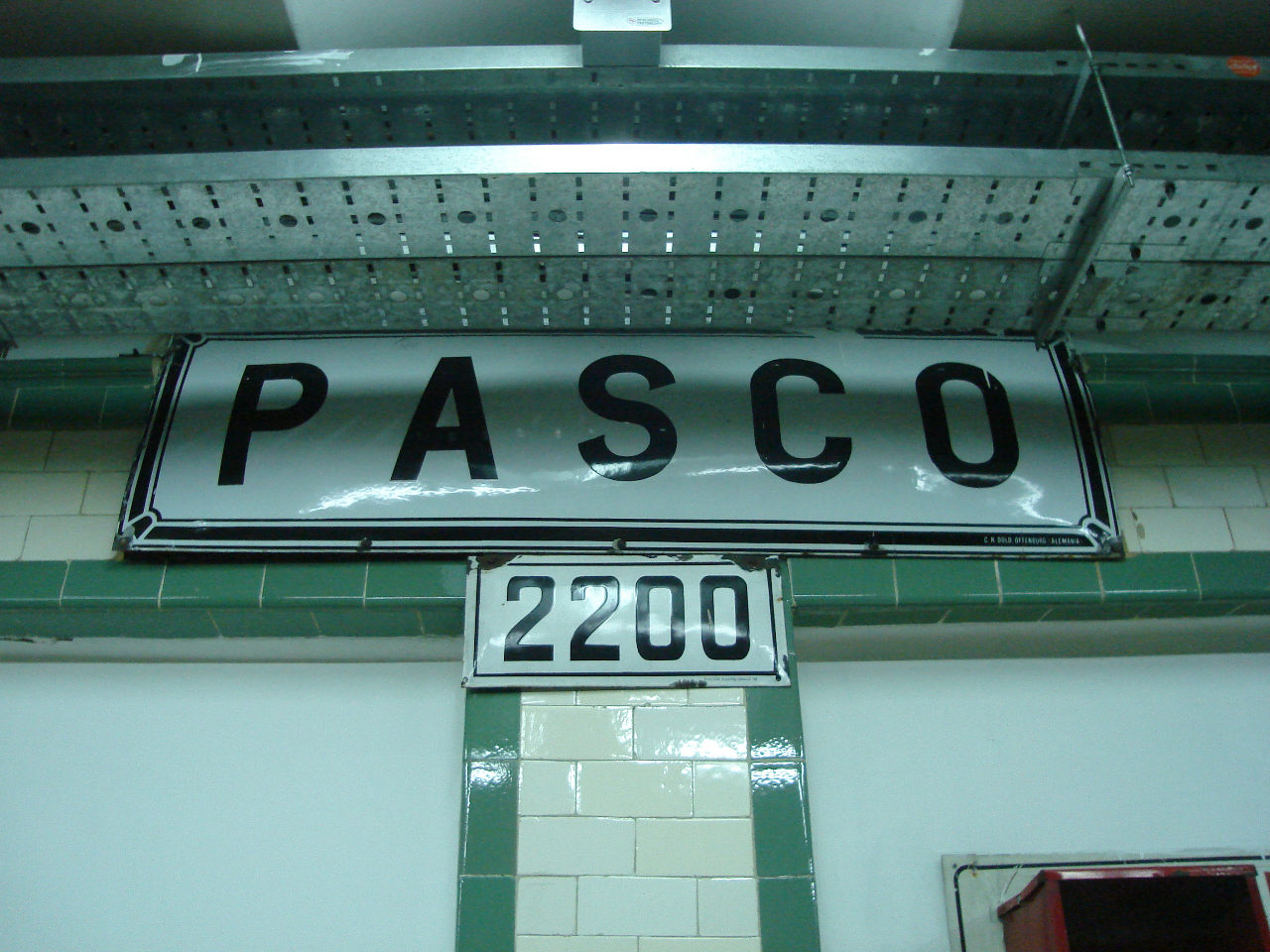
Original signage at Pasco station

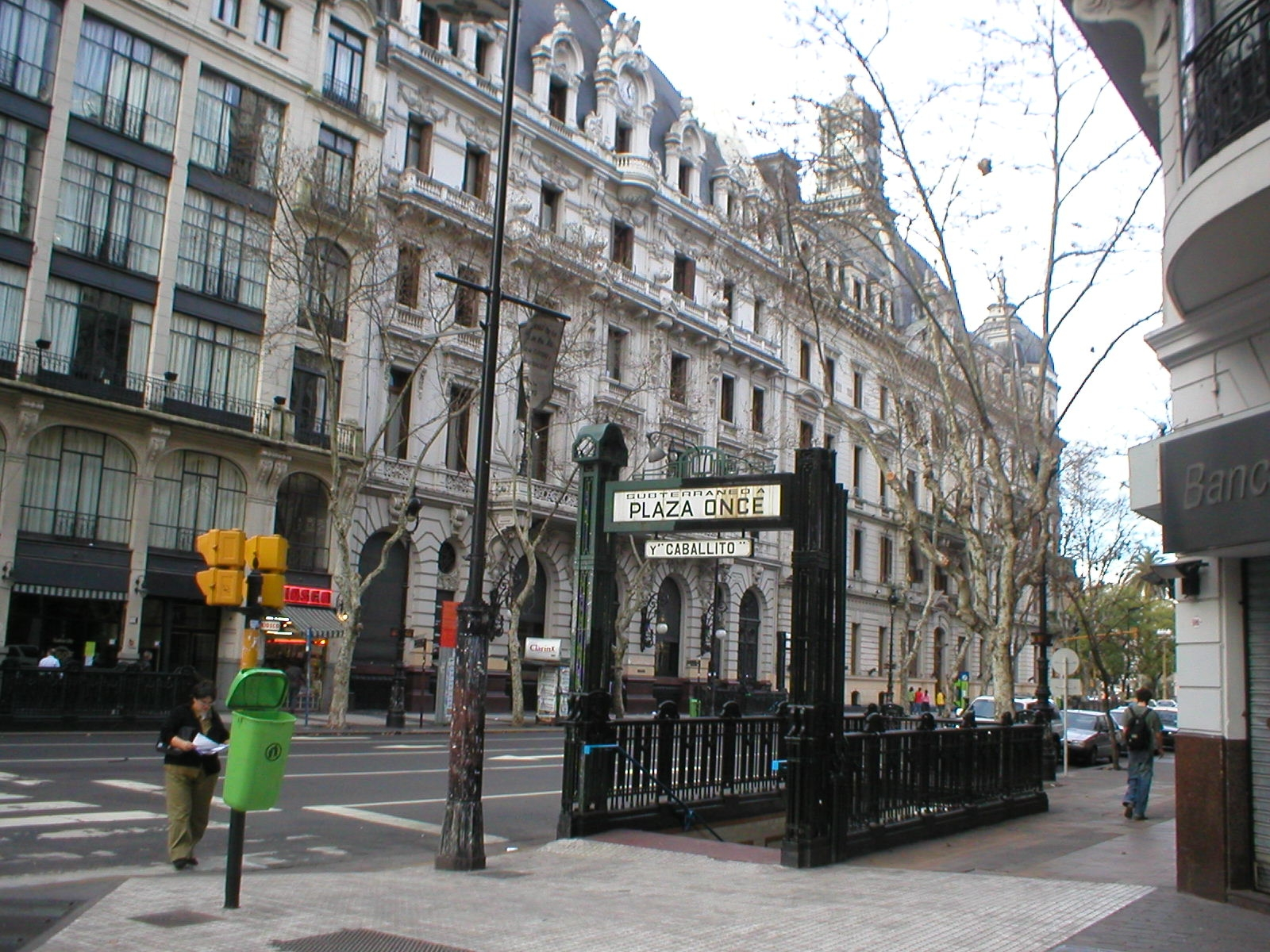
Avenida de Mayo station entrance

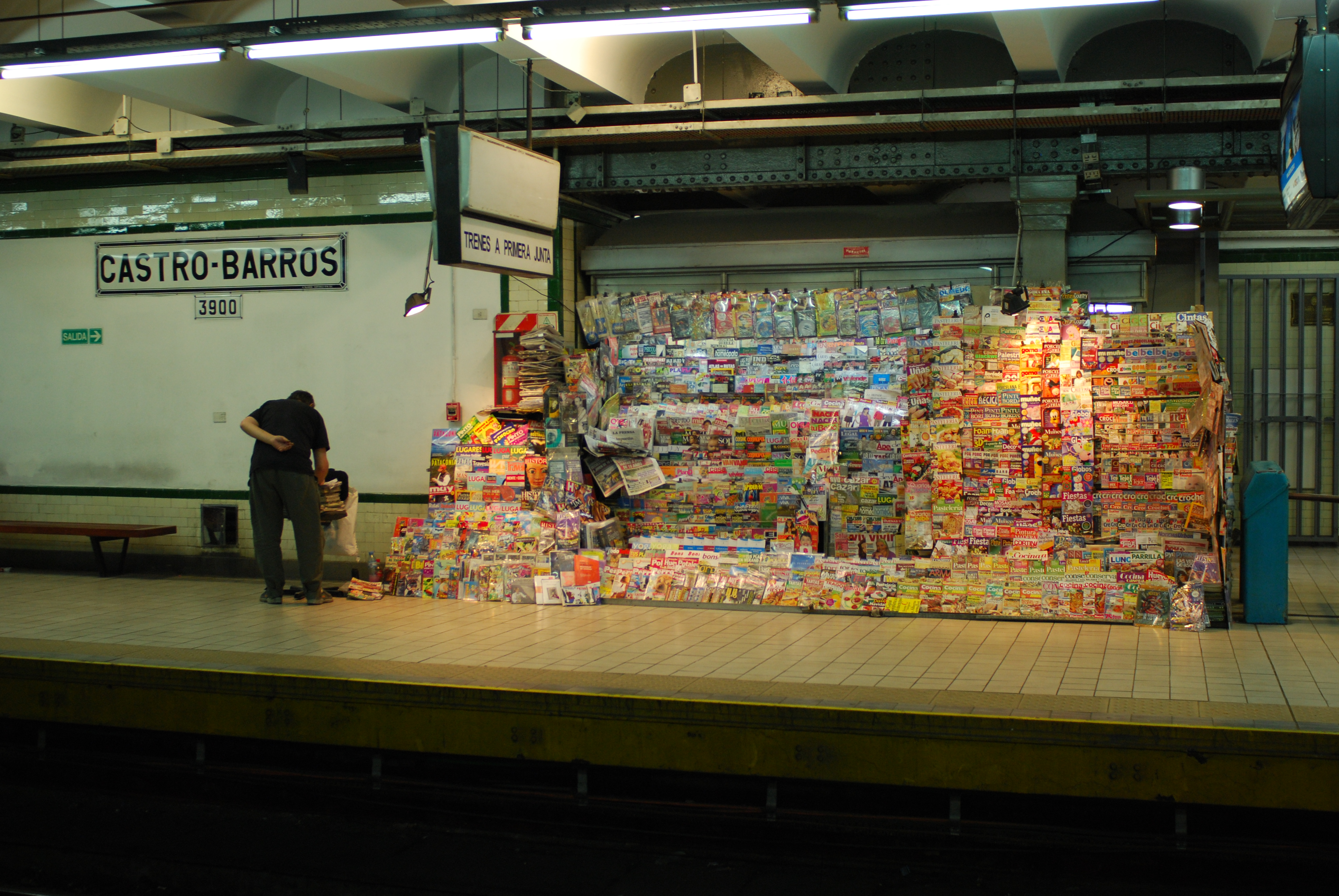
Kiosk on Castro Barros station

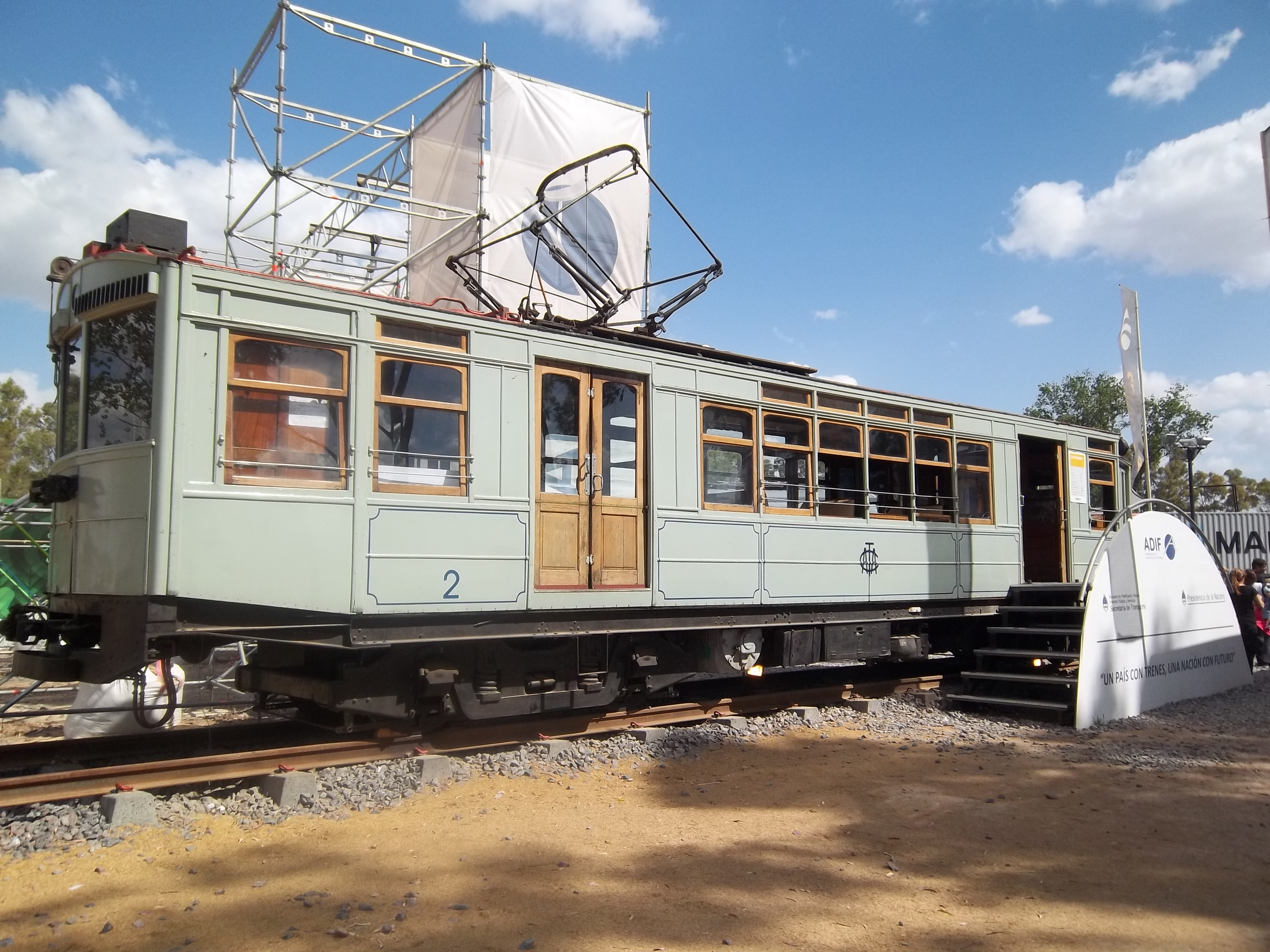
UEC Preston cars were also used on the line

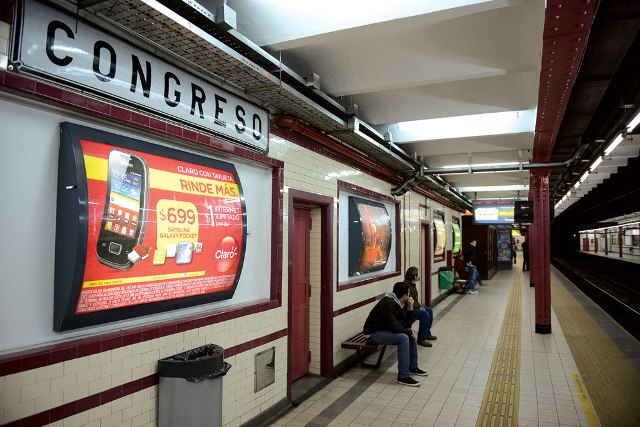
Interior of Congreso station

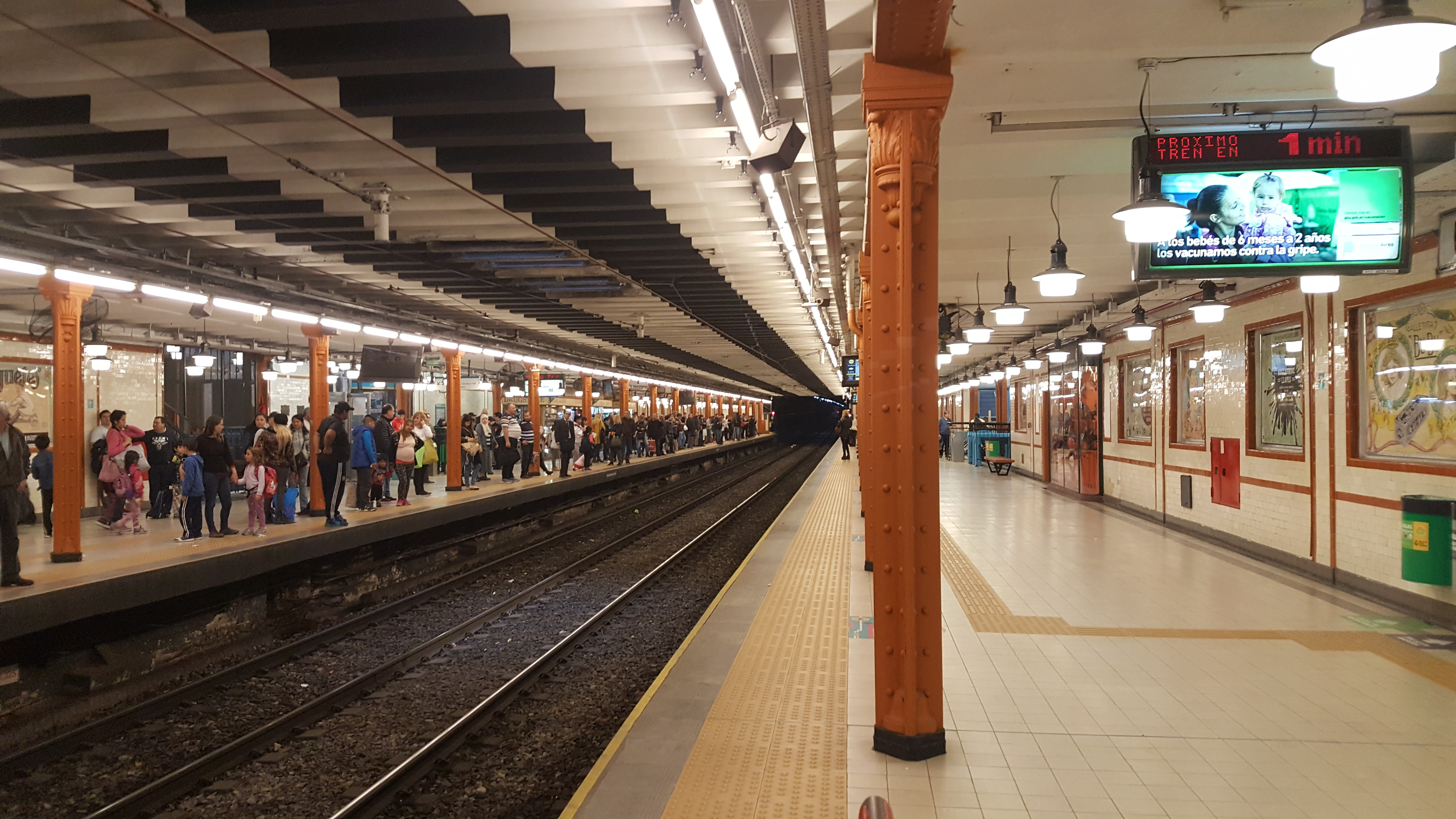
Lima Station from August 2017

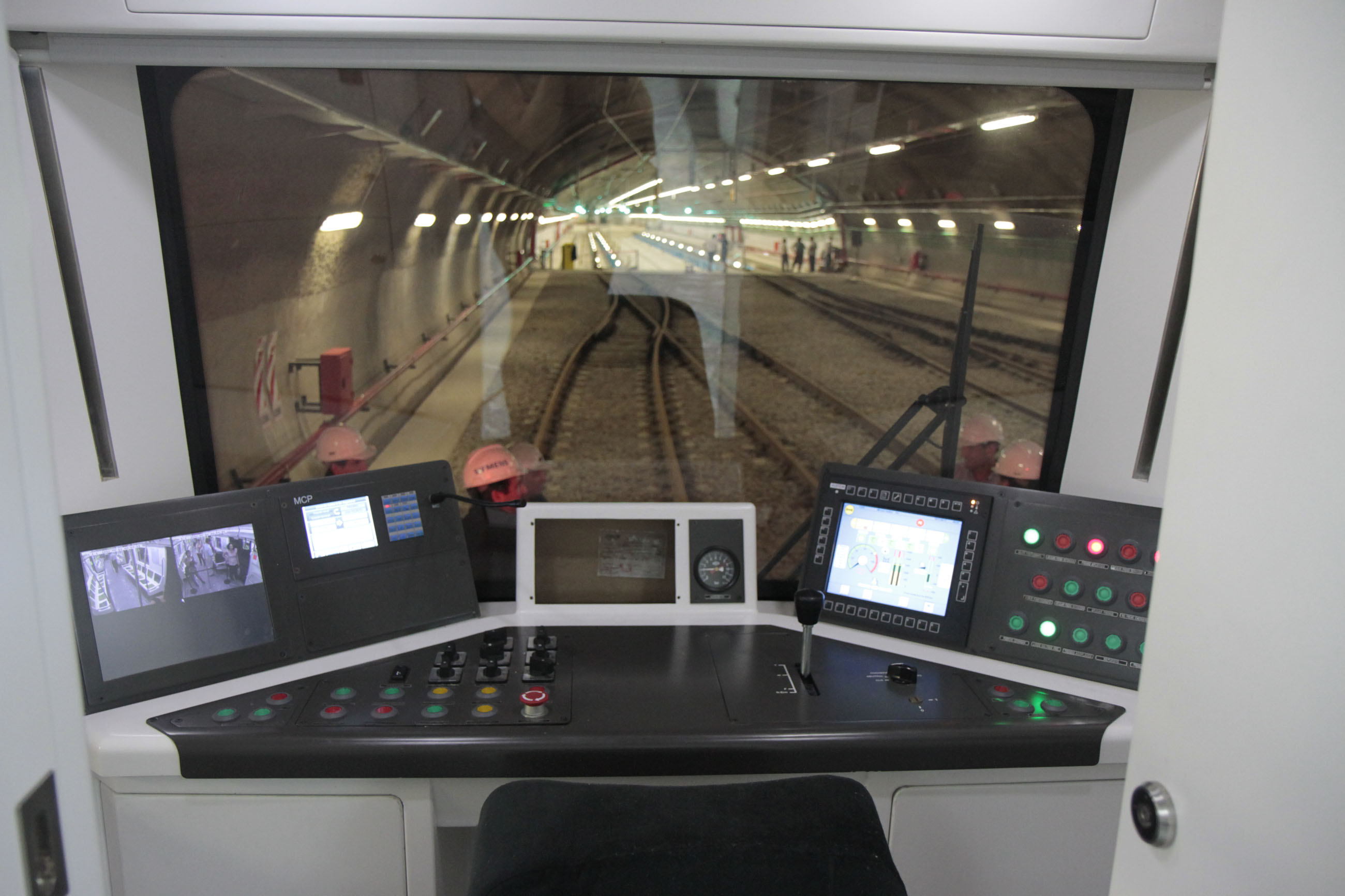
Conductor's cabin of a CNR train

== See also ==
- Anglo-Argentine Tramways Company
- La Brugeoise cars
- Polvorín Workshop
- Tram and light-rail transit systems
- Trams in Buenos Aires
- UEC Preston
