= San Pedrito (Buenos Aires Underground) =

Buenos Aires Underground station

Coordinates: 34°37′51″S 58°28′11″W

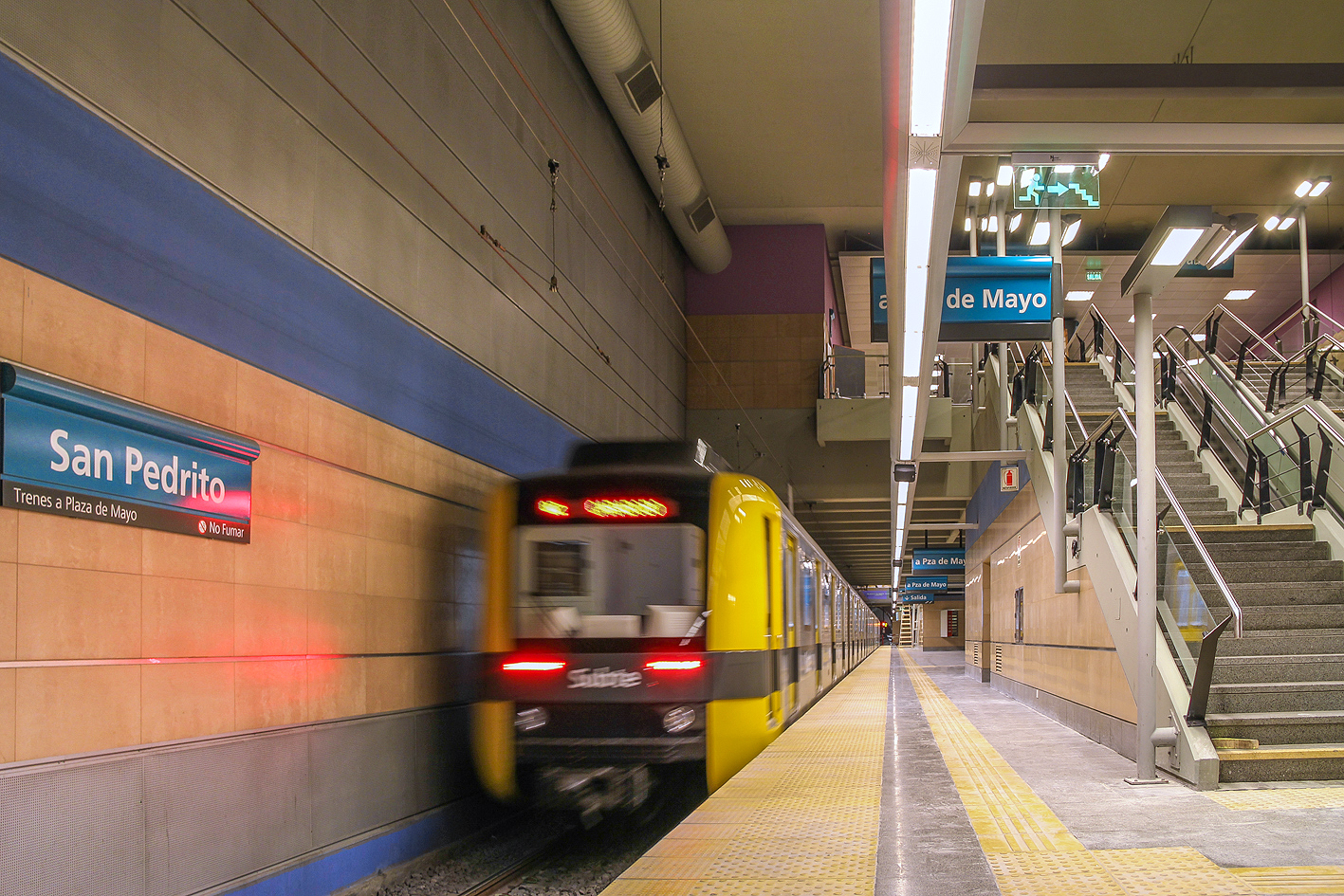

General information
- Location: Av. Rivadavia y Av. Nazca/Av. San Pedrito
- Platforms: Island platforms

History
- Opened: 27 September 2013

Services
Preceding station	Buenos Aires Underground	Following station
Terminus	Line A	San José de Flores towards Plaza de Mayo
Location

San Pedrito is a station on Line A of the Buenos Aires Underground and it is the current terminus of the line. The station was opened on 27 September 2013 as a part of the extension of the line from Carabobo.
