= Plaza de Mayo (Buenos Aires Underground) =

Buenos Aires Underground station

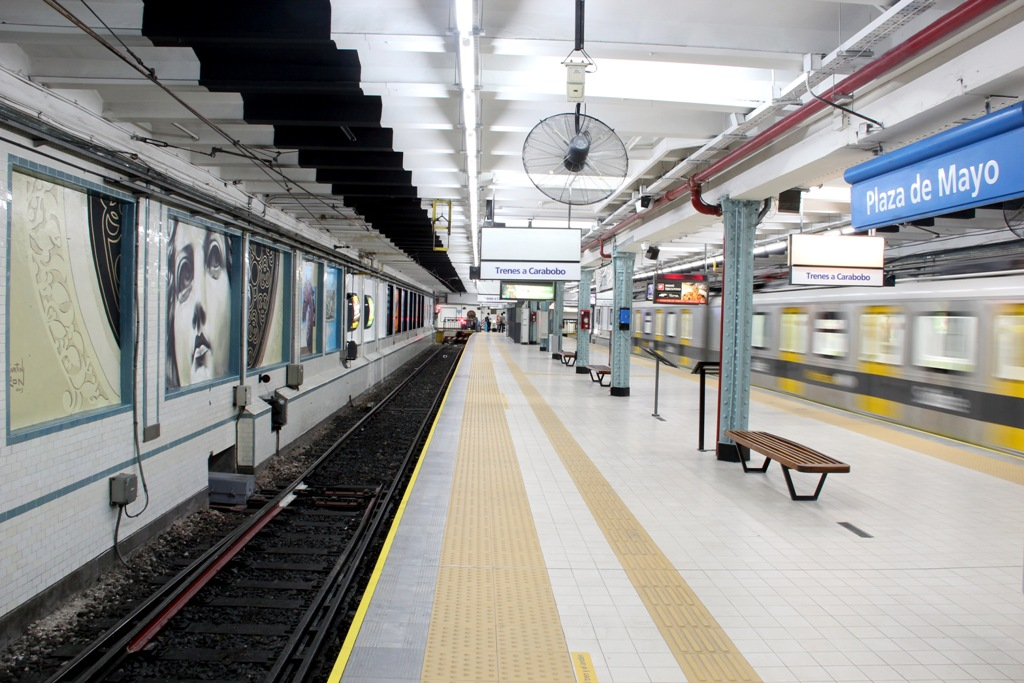

General information
- Location: Hipólito Yrigoyen and Defensa
- Coordinates: 34°36′31.9″S 58°22′15″W
- Platforms: Island platforms

History
- Opened: 1 December 1913

Services
Preceding station	Buenos Aires Underground	Following station
Perú towards San Pedrito	Line A	Terminus
Location

Plaza de Mayo is a station on Line A of the Buenos Aires Underground. This station belonged to the first section of line opened on 1 December 1913, linking the station with the station of Plaza Miserere.

== Overview ==
It lies at the intersection of Hipólito Yrigoyen and Defensa, in the neighborhood of Montserrat. It's a busy station because it is the head of the line A and is in the historic centre of Buenos Aires. Nearby are some of the most important public buildings in the country such as the Casa Rosada, the Ministry of Economy, the Metropolitan Cathedral and the Buenos Aires City Hall. There is also the Plaza de Mayo, tourist and protest centre where the Pirámide de Mayo is located. A few hundred metres is located the Puerto Madero district, another of the city's tourist zones.

The station was named in honor of Plaza de Mayo, the most important square of the city. The Plaza was in colonial times the main square (Plaza Mayor) around which the city was formed, always being the center of popular demand.

In 1997 the station was declared a national historic monument.

== Gallery ==
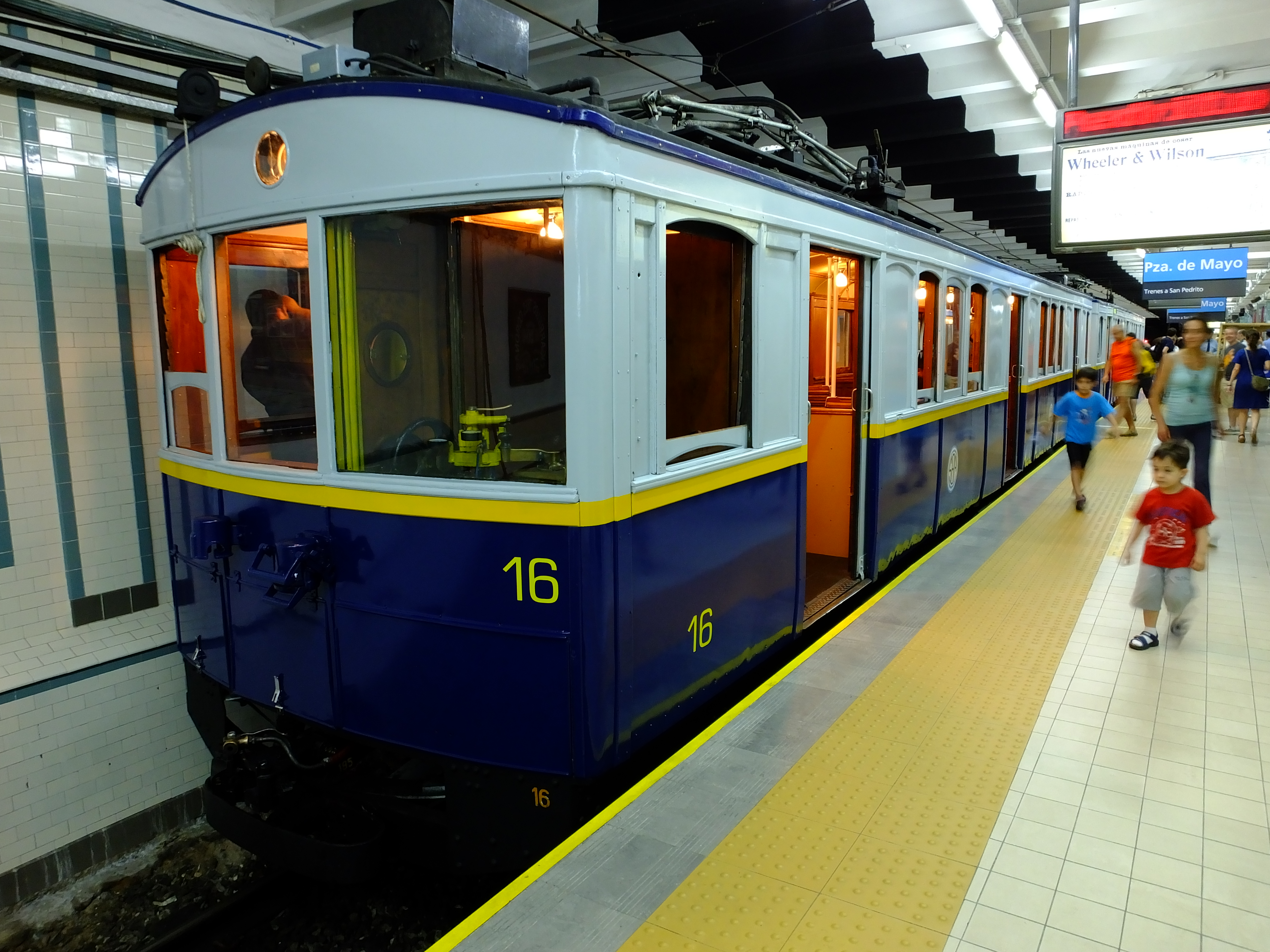
A La Brugeoise train

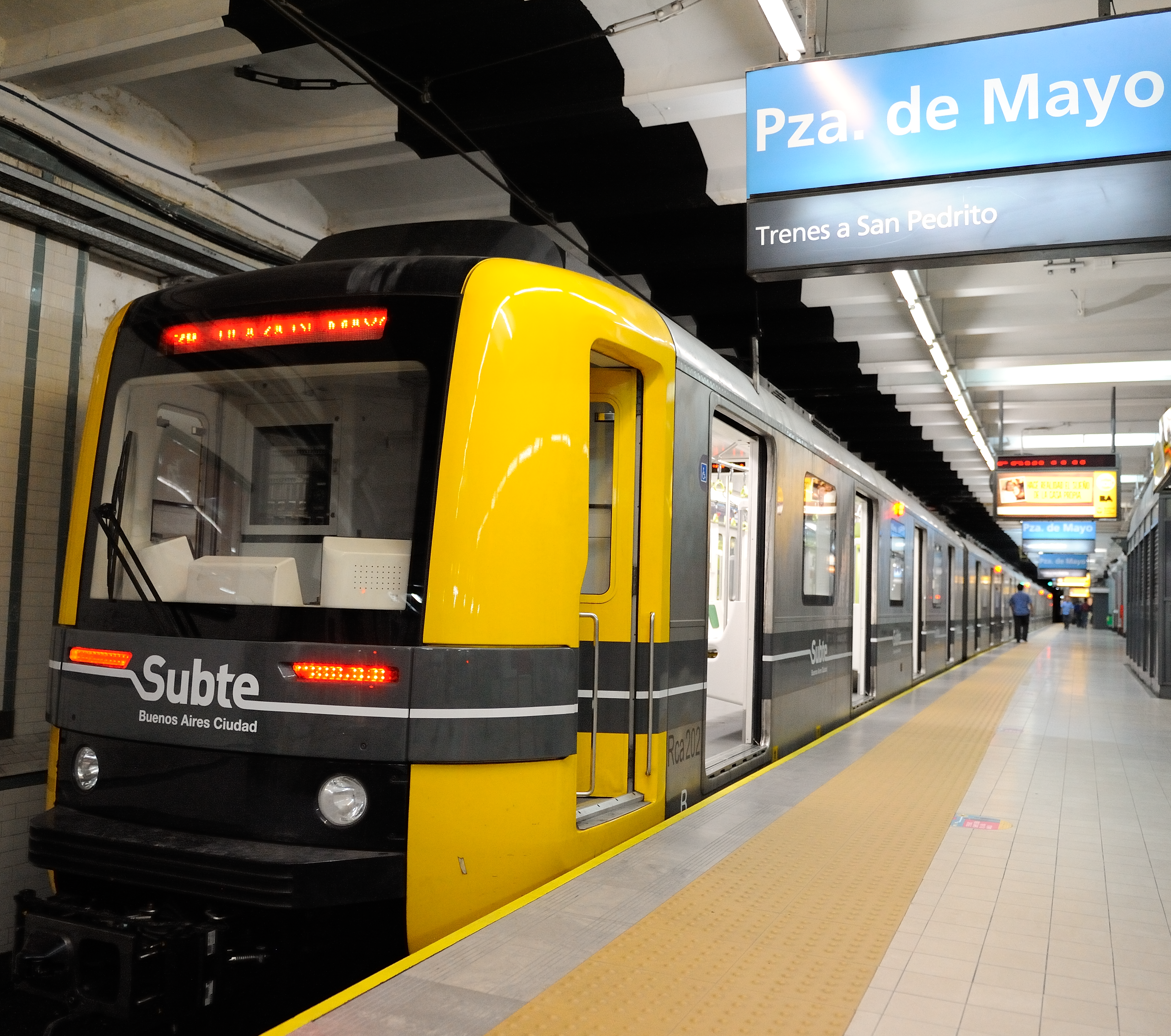
A new CSR train

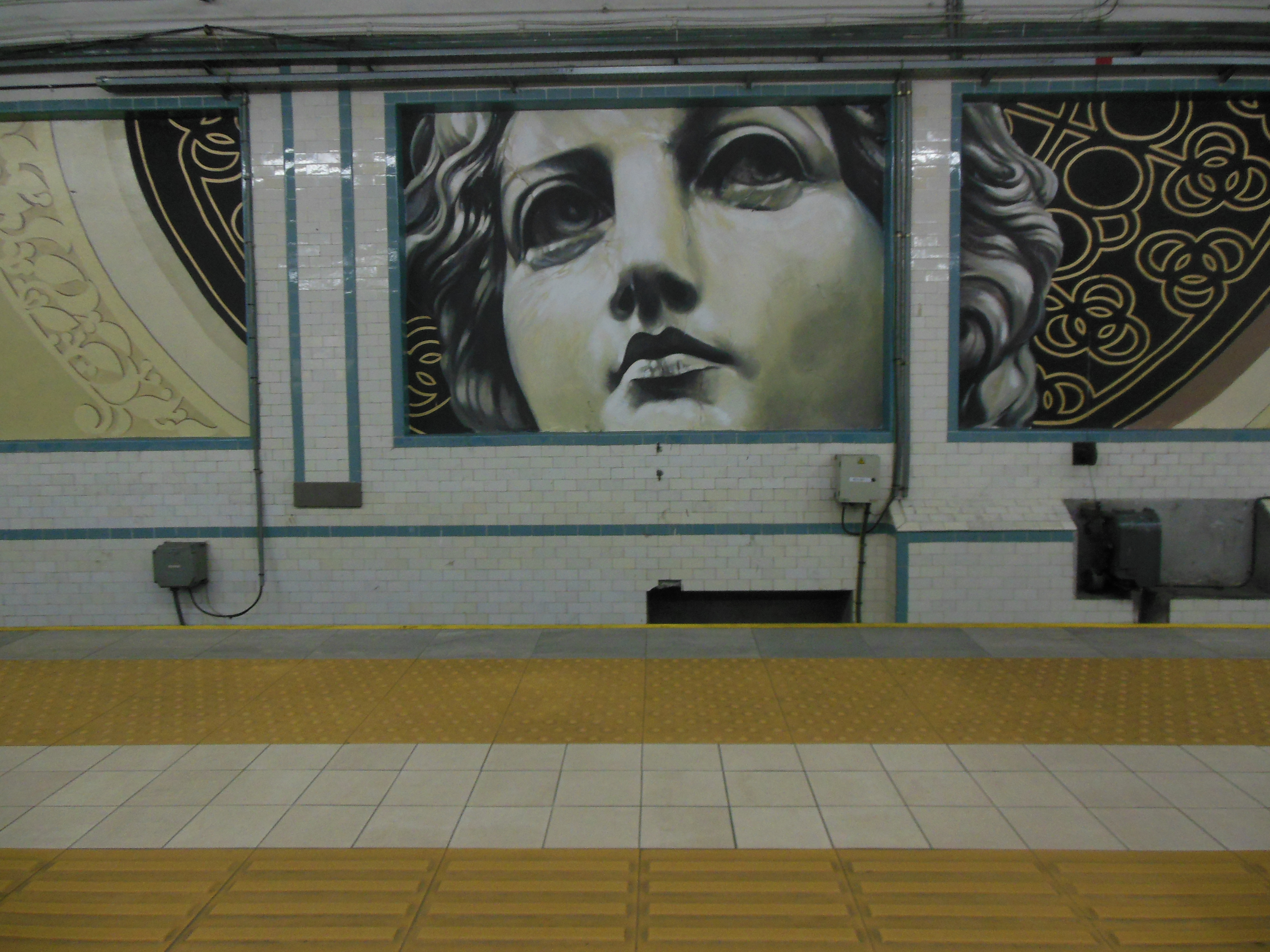
Murals

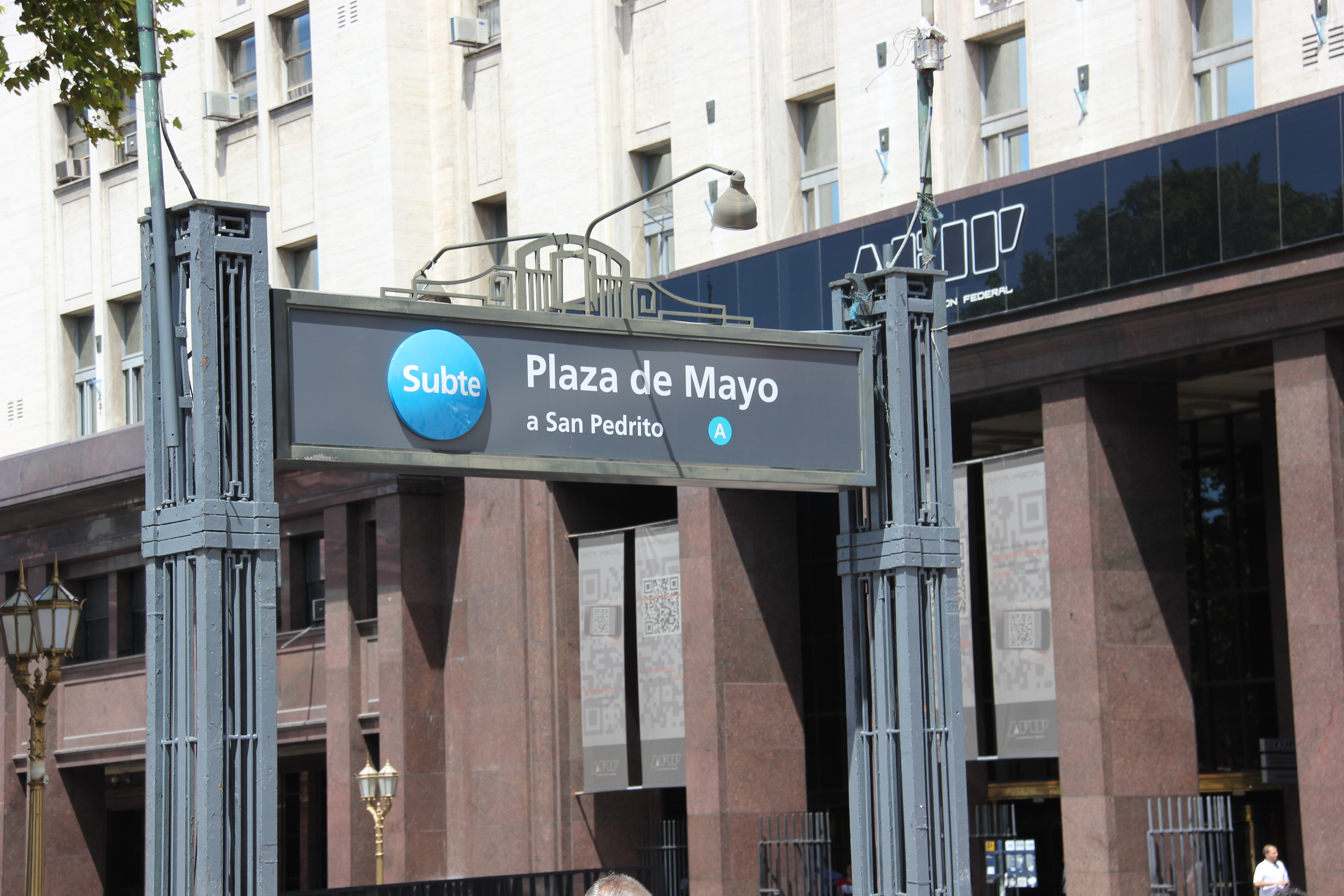
Station entrance

== Nearby ==
- Plaza de Mayo
- Casa Rosada
- Buenos Aires Metropolitan Cathedral
- Buenos Aires Cabildo
- Florida Street
- Puerto Madero
