= List of Buenos Aires Underground stations =

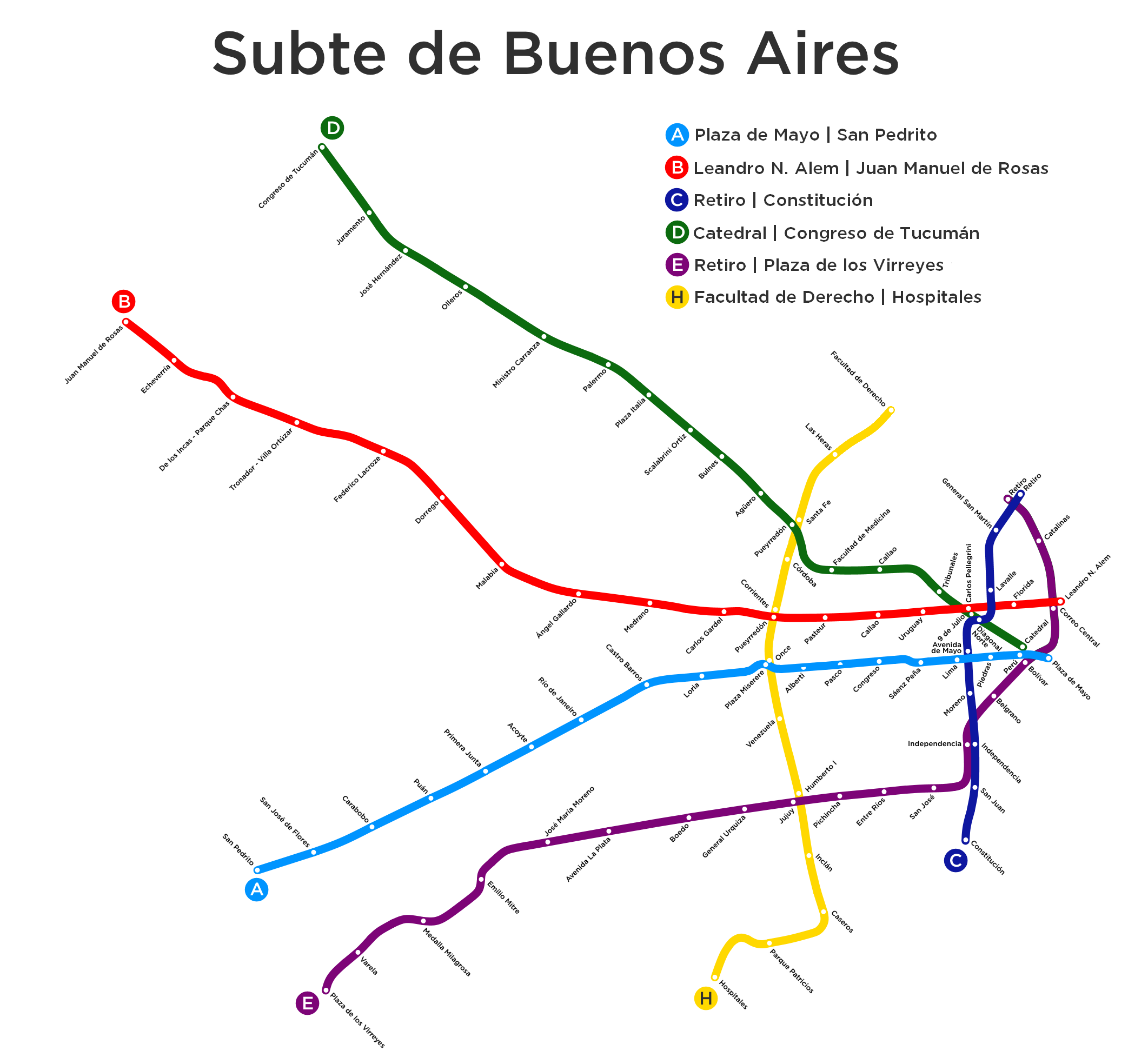
A map of Buenos Aires Underground lines currently in operation

The Buenos Aires Underground (locally known as subte, from "subterráneo") is a mass-transit network that serves the city of Buenos Aires, Argentina.

== Lines ==
Line	Type	Stations	Former	Under construction	Planned	Notes
Line A (Buenos Aires Underground)	Underground	18	2			
Line B (Buenos Aires Underground)	Underground	17				
Line C (Buenos Aires Underground)	Underground	9				
Line D (Buenos Aires Underground)	Underground	16	1			
Line E (Buenos Aires Underground)	Underground	18	3			
Line F (Buenos Aires Underground)	Underground				7	planned
Line G (Buenos Aires Underground)	Underground					planned
Line H (Buenos Aires Underground)	Underground	12			1	
Line I (Buenos Aires Underground)	Underground					planned
PreMetro E2 (Buenos Aires)	PreMetro	17				
Total		107	6		8	

== Stations ==
There are 87 underground stations and 18 premetro stations.

Station	Line	Opening Date
Plaza de Mayo	Line A (Buenos Aires Underground)	1 December 1913
Perú	Line A (Buenos Aires Underground)	1 December 1913
Piedras	Line A (Buenos Aires Underground)	1 December 1913
Lima	Line A (Buenos Aires Underground)	1 December 1913
Sáenz Peña	Line A (Buenos Aires Underground)	1 December 1913
Congreso	Line A (Buenos Aires Underground)	1 December 1913
Pasco	Line A (Buenos Aires Underground)	1 December 1913
Alberti	Line A (Buenos Aires Underground)	1 December 1913
Plaza Miserere	Line A (Buenos Aires Underground)	1 December 1913
Loria	Line A (Buenos Aires Underground)	1 April 1914
Castro Barros	Line A (Buenos Aires Underground)	1 April 1914
Río de Janeiro	Line A (Buenos Aires Underground)	1 April 1914
Acoyte	Line A (Buenos Aires Underground)	1 July 1914
Primera Junta	Line A (Buenos Aires Underground)	1 July 1914
Puán	Line A (Buenos Aires Underground)	23 December 2008
Carabobo	Line A (Buenos Aires Underground)	23 December 2008
San José de Flores	Line A (Buenos Aires Underground)	27 September 2013
San Pedrito	Line A (Buenos Aires Underground)	27 September 2013
Leandro N. Alem	Line B (Buenos Aires Underground)	1 December 1931
Florida	Line B (Buenos Aires Underground)	15 December 1931
Carlos Pellegrini	Line B (Buenos Aires Underground)	22 July 1931
Uruguay	Line B (Buenos Aires Underground)	22 July 1931
Callao	Line B (Buenos Aires Underground)	17 October 1930
Pasteur - AMIA	Line B (Buenos Aires Underground)	17 October 1930
Pueyrredón	Line B (Buenos Aires Underground)	17 October 1930
Carlos Gardel	Line B (Buenos Aires Underground)	17 October 1930
Medrano	Line B (Buenos Aires Underground)	17 October 1930
Ángel Gallardo	Line B (Buenos Aires Underground)	17 October 1930
Malabia - Osvaldo Pugliese	Line B (Buenos Aires Underground)	17 October 1930
Dorrego	Line B (Buenos Aires Underground)	17 October 1930
Federico Lacroze	Line B (Buenos Aires Underground)	17 October 1930
Tronador - Villa Ortúzar	Line B (Buenos Aires Underground)	9 August 2003
Los Incas - Parque Chas	Line B (Buenos Aires Underground)	9 August 2003
Echeverría	Line B (Buenos Aires Underground)	26 July 2013
Juan Manuel de Rosas	Line B (Buenos Aires Underground)	26 July 2013
Retiro	Line C (Buenos Aires Underground)	6 February 1936
General San Martín	Line C (Buenos Aires Underground)	17 August 1937
Lavalle	Line C (Buenos Aires Underground)	6 February 1936
Diagonal Norte	Line C (Buenos Aires Underground)	6 February 1936
Avenida de Mayo	Line C (Buenos Aires Underground)	9 November 1934
Moreno	Line C (Buenos Aires Underground)	9 November 1934
Independencia	Line C (Buenos Aires Underground)	9 November 1934
San Juan	Line C (Buenos Aires Underground)	9 November 1934
Constitución	Line C (Buenos Aires Underground)	9 November 1934
Catedral	Line D (Buenos Aires Underground)	3 June 1937
9 de Julio	Line D (Buenos Aires Underground)	3 June 1937
Tribunales	Line D (Buenos Aires Underground)	3 June 1937
Callao	Line D (Buenos Aires Underground)	23 February 1940
Facultad de Medicina	Line D (Buenos Aires Underground)	23 February 1940
Pueyrredón	Line D (Buenos Aires Underground)	23 February 1940
Agüero	Line D (Buenos Aires Underground)	23 February 1940
Bulnes	Line D (Buenos Aires Underground)	23 February 1940
Scalabrini Ortiz	Line D (Buenos Aires Underground)	23 February 1940
Plaza Italia	Line D (Buenos Aires Underground)	23 February 1940
Palermo	Line D (Buenos Aires Underground)	23 February 1940
Ministro Carranza	Line D (Buenos Aires Underground)	29 December 1987
Olleros	Line D (Buenos Aires Underground)	31 May 1997
José Hernández	Line D (Buenos Aires Underground)	31 May 1997
Juramento	Line D (Buenos Aires Underground)	21 June 1999
Congreso de Tucumán	Line D (Buenos Aires Underground)	27 April 2000
Retiro	Line E (Buenos Aires Underground)	3 June 2019
Catalinas	Line E (Buenos Aires Underground)	3 June 2019
Correo Central	Line E (Buenos Aires Underground)	3 June 2019
Bolívar	Line E (Buenos Aires Underground)	24 April 1966
Belgrano	Line E (Buenos Aires Underground)	24 April 1966
Independencia	Line E (Buenos Aires Underground)	24 April 1966
San José	Line E (Buenos Aires Underground)	20 June 1944
Entre Ríos - Rodolfo Walsh	Line E (Buenos Aires Underground)	20 June 1944
Pichincha	Line E (Buenos Aires Underground)	20 June 1944
Jujuy	Line E (Buenos Aires Underground)	20 June 1944
General Urquiza	Line E (Buenos Aires Underground)	20 June 1944
Boedo	Line E (Buenos Aires Underground)	16 December 1944
Avenida La Plata	Line E (Buenos Aires Underground)	24 April 1966
José María Moreno	Line E (Buenos Aires Underground)	23 June 1973
Emilio Mitre	Line E (Buenos Aires Underground)	7 October 1985
Medalla Milagrosa	Line E (Buenos Aires Underground)	31 October 1985
Varela	Line E (Buenos Aires Underground)	27 November 1985
Plaza de los Virreyes - Eva Perón	Line E (Buenos Aires Underground)	8 May 1986
Facultad de Derecho	Line H (Buenos Aires Underground)	17 May 2018
Las Heras	Line H (Buenos Aires Underground)	18 December 2015
Santa Fe - Carlos Jáuregui	Line H (Buenos Aires Underground)	12 July 2016
Córdoba	Line H (Buenos Aires Underground)	18 December 2015
Corrientes	Line H (Buenos Aires Underground)	6 December 2010
Once - 30 de Diciembre	Line H (Buenos Aires Underground)	18 October 2007
Venezuela	Line H (Buenos Aires Underground)	18 October 2007
Humberto I	Line H (Buenos Aires Underground)	18 October 2007
Inclán	Line H (Buenos Aires Underground)	18 October 2007
Caseros	Line H (Buenos Aires Underground)	18 October 2007
Parque Patricios	Line H (Buenos Aires Underground)	4 October 2011
Hospitales	Line H (Buenos Aires Underground)	27 May 2013
Intendente Saguier	PreMetro E2 (Buenos Aires)	29 April 1987
Balbastro	PreMetro E2 (Buenos Aires)	29 April 1987
Mariano Acosta	PreMetro E2 (Buenos Aires)	29 April 1987
Somellera	PreMetro E2 (Buenos Aires)	29 April 1987
Ana María Janer	PreMetro E2 (Buenos Aires)	29 April 1987
Fátima	PreMetro E2 (Buenos Aires)	13 March 2000
Fernández de la Cruz	PreMetro E2 (Buenos Aires)	29 April 1987
Presidente Illia	PreMetro E2 (Buenos Aires)	29 April 1987
Parque de la Ciudad	PreMetro E2 (Buenos Aires)	29 April 1987
Cecilia Grierson	PreMetro E2 (Buenos Aires)	29 April 1987
Escalada	PreMetro E2 (Buenos Aires)	29 April 1987
Pola	PreMetro E2 (Buenos Aires)	7 November 2006
Ana Díaz	PreMetro E2 (Buenos Aires)	29 April 1987
Centro Cívico	PreMetro E2 (Buenos Aires)	29 April 1987
Larrazabal	PreMetro E2 (Buenos Aires)	29 April 1987
Nicolás Descalzi	PreMetro E2 (Buenos Aires)	29 April 1987
Gabino Ezeiza	PreMetro E2 (Buenos Aires)	29 April 1987
General Savio	PreMetro E2 (Buenos Aires)	29 April 1987

== Stations under construction ==
Station	Line	Notes
Sáenz	Line H (Buenos Aires Underground)	under construction

== Ghost stations ==
Station	Line	Notes
Pasco Sur	Line A (Buenos Aires Underground)	ghost
Alberti Norte	Line A (Buenos Aires Underground)	ghost
San José vieja	Line E (Buenos Aires Underground)	ghost
Constitución	Line E (Buenos Aires Underground)	ghost
Apeadero Carranza	Line D (Buenos Aires Underground)	Temporary station
Apeadero Boedo	Line E (Buenos Aires Underground)	Temporary station

== See also ==
- Buenos Aires Underground
- List of metro systems
