= Escalada (Buenos Aires Premetro) =

Buenos Aires Premetro station

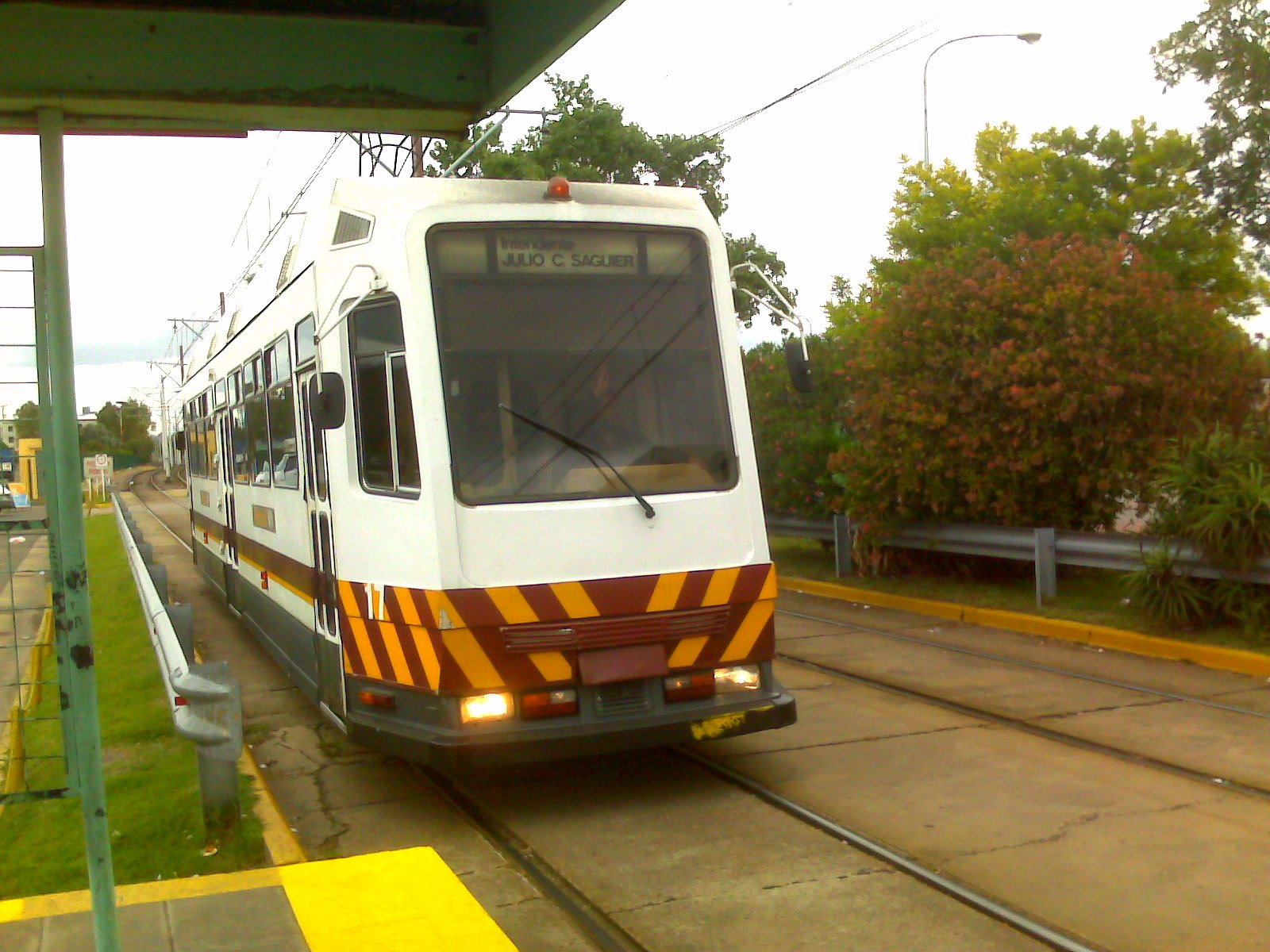

General information
- Location: Fernández de la Cruz and Escalada
- Coordinates: 34°40′28″S 58°27′37″W
- Platforms: Side platforms

History
- Opened: 29 April 1987

Services
Preceding station	Buenos Aires Underground	Following station
Pola towards General Savio or Centro Cívico	Premetro	Cecilia Grierson towards Intendente Saguier
Location

Escalada is a station on the Buenos Aires Premetro. It was opened on 29 April 1987 together with the other Premetro stations. The station is located in the Barrio of Villa Lugano, near the Parque de la Ciudad and Parque Indoamericano parks, a few meters away from the avenue that gives name to the station.

The station was formerly called Jumbo, however it was renamed in 2003 along with several other stations.
