= Larrazábal (Buenos Aires Premetro) =

Buenos Aires Premetro station

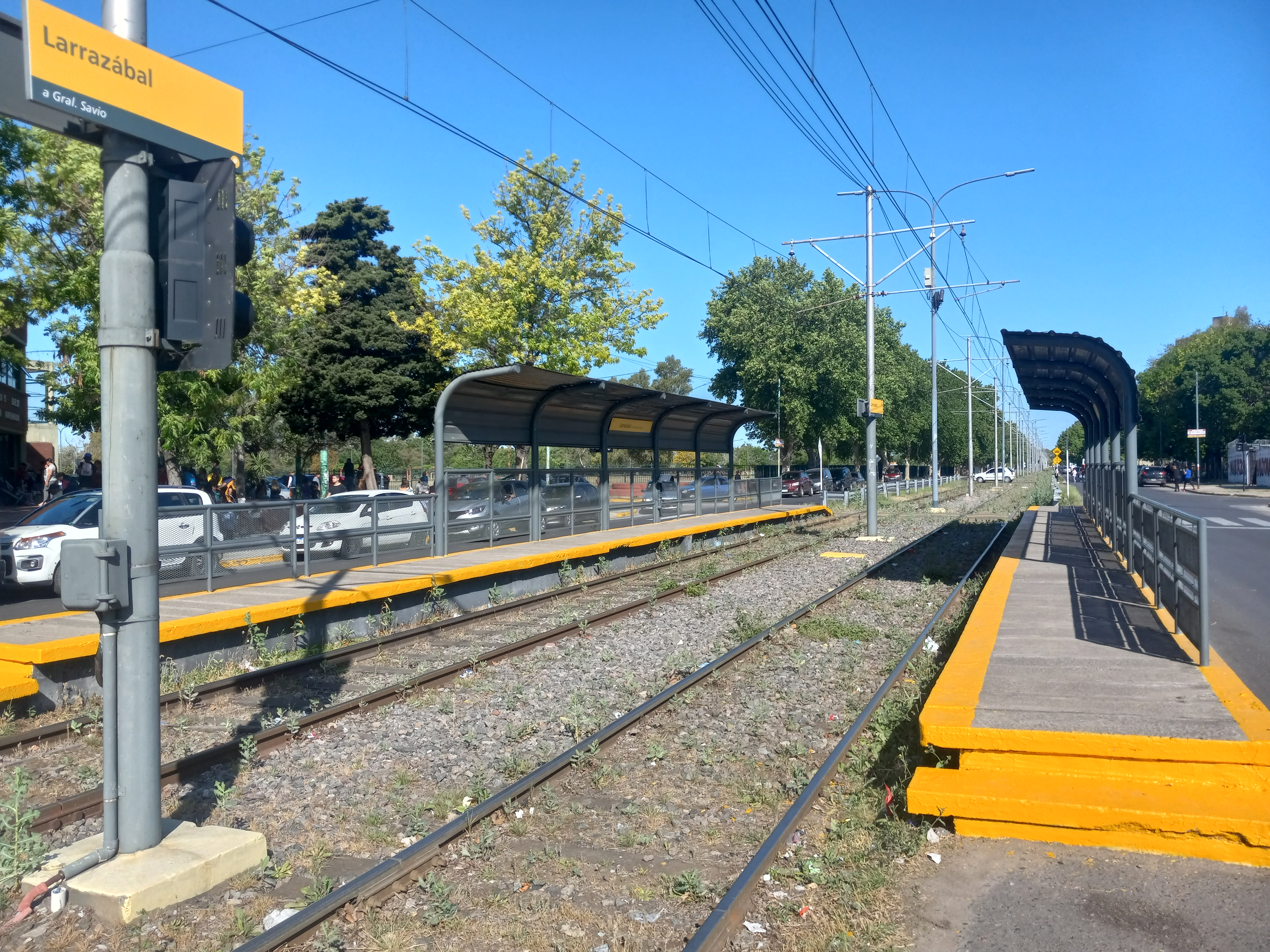

General information
- Location: Larrazábal and Ana Díaz
- Coordinates: 34°40′50″S 58°27′55″W
- Platforms: Side platforms

History
- Opened: 29 April 1987

Services
Preceding station	Buenos Aires Underground	Following station
Nicolás Descalzi towards General Savio	Premetro	Pola towards Intendente Saguier
Location

Larrazábal is a station on the Buenos Aires Premetro. The station is on the branch that terminates at General Savio station. It was opened on 29 April 1987 together with the other Premetro stations. The station is located in the Barrio of Villa Lugano, near a large social housing complex.

The station was formerly called Armada Argentina, but was renamed in 2003 along with several other stations.
