= Somellera (Buenos Aires Premetro) =

Buenos Aires Premetro station

General information
- Location: Mariano Acosta and Somellera
- Coordinates: 34°39′23″S 58°27′14″W
- Platforms: Side platforms

History
- Opened: 29 April 1987

Services
| Preceding station | Buenos Aires Underground | Following station |
|---|---|---|
| Ana María Janer towards General Savio or Centro Cívico | Premetro | Mariano Acosta towards Intendente Saguier |
Location

Somellera is a station on the Buenos Aires Premetro. It was opened on 29 April 1987 together with the other Premetro stations. The station is located in the Barrio of Villa Soldati and is located near the Premetro workshops, where the Materfer trams are serviced and stored.
