= Nicolás Descalzi (Buenos Aires Premetro) =

Buenos Aires Premetro station

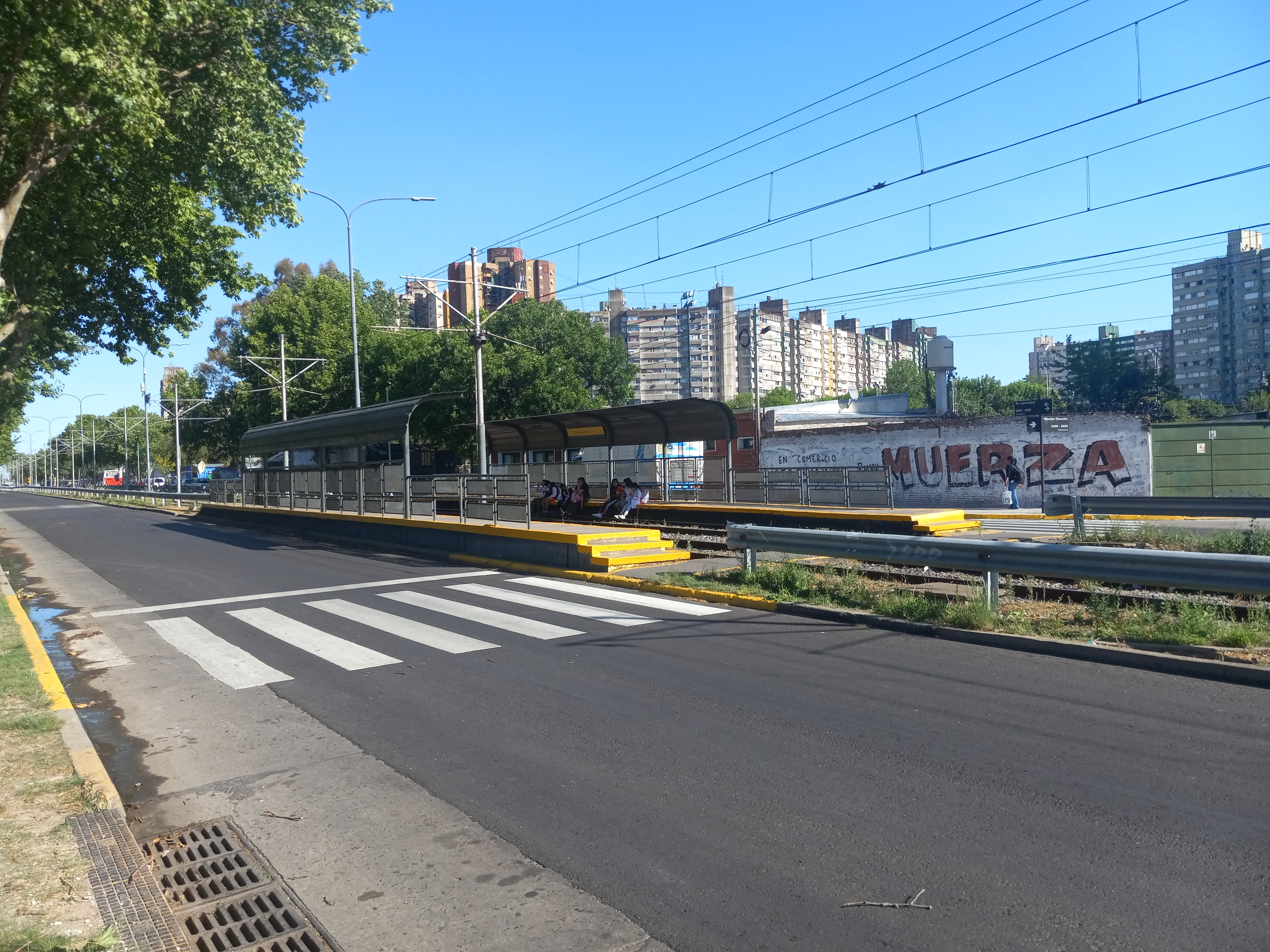

General information
- Location: Larrazábal and Nicolás Descalzi
- Coordinates: 34°40′58″S 58°27′45″W
- Platforms: Side platforms

History
- Opened: 29 April 1987

Services
| Preceding station | Buenos Aires Underground | Following station |
|---|---|---|
| Gabino Ezeiza towards General Savio | Premetro | Larrazábal towards Intendente Saguier |
Location

Nicolás Descalzi is a station on the Buenos Aires Premetro. The station is on the branch that terminates at General Savio station. It was opened on 29 April 1987 together with the other Premetro stations. The station is located in the Barrio of Villa Lugano, near a large social housing complex.

The station was formerly called Ministro Carrillo, but was renamed in 2003 along with several other stations. It is named after the Italian explorer of the same name.
