= Ana María Janer (Buenos Aires Premetro) =

Buenos Aires Premetro station

General information
- Location: Mariano Acosta and Ana María Janer
- Coordinates: 34°39′34″S 58°27′00″W
- Platforms: Side platforms

History
- Opened: 29 April 1987

Services
| Preceding station | Buenos Aires Underground | Following station |
|---|---|---|
| Fátima towards General Savio or Centro Cívico | Premetro | Somellera towards Intendente Saguier |
Location

Ana María Janer is a station on the Buenos Aires Premetro, which opened on 29 April 1987, alongside other Premetro stations. The station is located in the Barrio of Villa Soldati in the vicinity of Sacachispas Fútbol Club.

The station was formerly called Fuerza Aérea but was renamed in 2003 as part of a broader rebranding of several stations.
