= Cecilia Grierson (Buenos Aires Premetro) =

Buenos Aires Premetro station

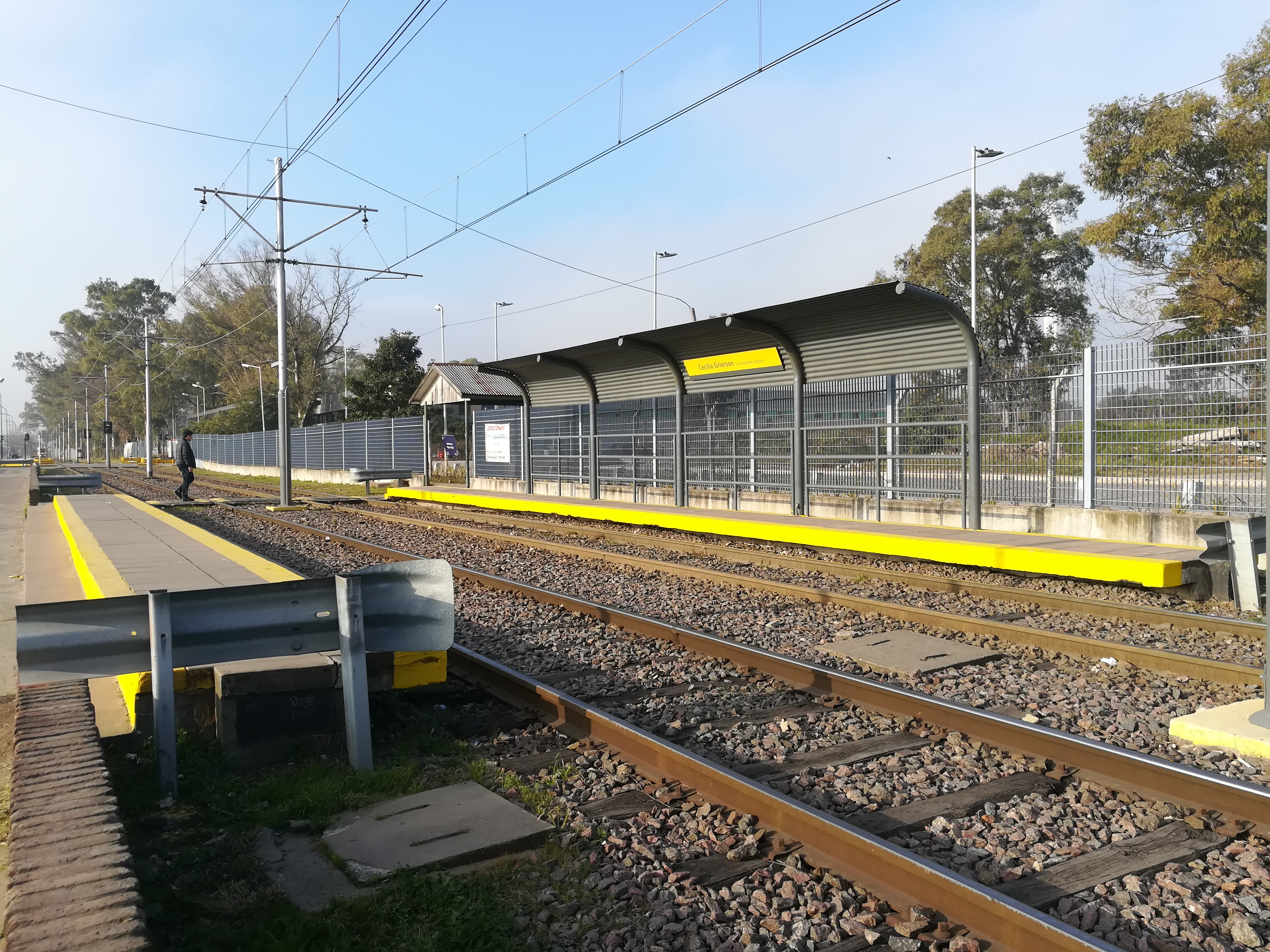

General information
- Location: Fernández de la Cruz 4400
- Coordinates: 34°40′19″S 58°27′27″W
- Platforms: Side platforms

History
- Opened: 29 April 1987

Services
Preceding station	Buenos Aires Underground	Following station
Escalada towards General Savio or Centro Cívico	Premetro	Parque de la Ciudad towards Intendente Saguier
Location

Cecilia Grierson is a station on the Buenos Aires Premetro. It was opened on 29 April 1987 together with the other Premetro stations. The station is located in the Barrio of Villa Soldati, near Parque de la Ciudad. It will provide access to the Predio Ferial Olímpico and the Youth Olympic Village (YOV) for the 2018 Summer Youth Olympics.
