= Fernández de la Cruz (Buenos Aires Premetro) =

Buenos Aires Premetro station

General information
- Location: Mariano Acosta and Fernández de la Cruz; Argentina
- Coordinates: 34°39′44″S 58°26′48″W
- Platforms: Side platforms

History
- Opened: 29 April 1987

Services
Preceding station	Buenos Aires Underground	Following station
Presidente Illia towards General Savio or Centro Cívico	Premetro	Fátima towards Intendente Saguier
Location

Fernández de la Cruz is a station on the Buenos Aires Premetro. It was opened on 29 April 1987 together with the other Premetro stations. The station is located in the Barrio of Villa Soldati in the vicinity of Sacachispas Fútbol Club.
