= Pola (Buenos Aires Premetro) =

Buenos Aires Premetro station

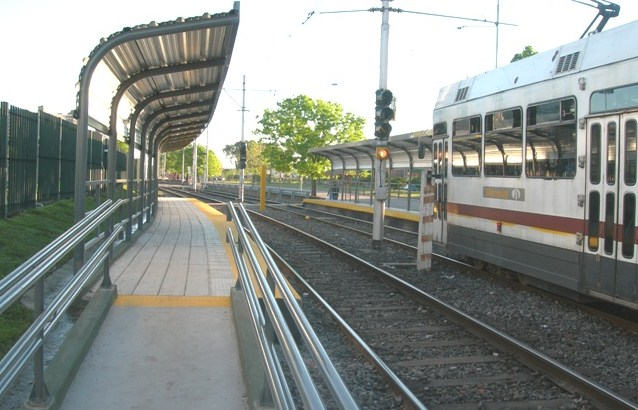

General information
- Location: Fernández de la Cruz and Pola
- Coordinates: 34°40′41″S 58°27′52″W
- Platforms: Side platforms

History
- Opened: 7 November 2006

Services
Preceding station	Buenos Aires Underground	Following station
Larrazábal towards General Savio	Premetro	Escalada towards Intendente Saguier
Ana Díaz towards Centro Cívico	Premetro	Escalada towards Intendente Saguier
Location

Pola is a station on the Buenos Aires Premetro. After this station, the line branches off into two routes to its two southerly terminals. It was opened on 7 November 2006. The station is located in the Barrio of Villa Lugano, near a large social housing complex.
