= Presidente Illia (Buenos Aires Premetro) =

Buenos Aires Premetro station

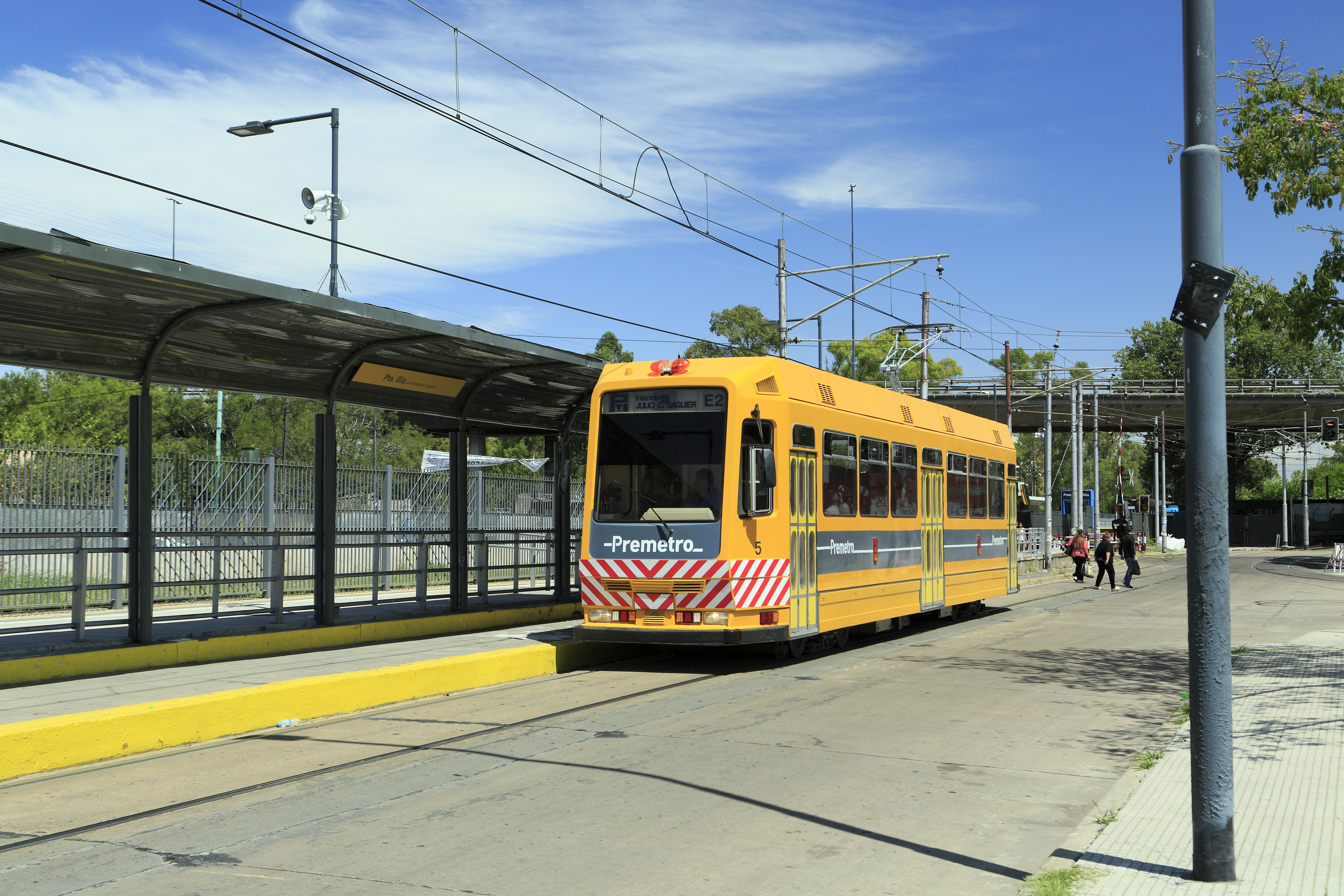

General information
- Location: Av. Fernández de la Cruz and Av. Lacarra
- Coordinates: 34°39′55″S 58°26′55″W
- Platforms: Side platforms
- Connections: Metrobus Sur and Belgrano Sur Line

History
- Opened: 29 April 1987; 39 years ago

Services
Preceding station	Buenos Aires Underground	Following station
Parque de la Ciudad towards General Savio or Centro Cívico	Premetro	Fernández de la Cruz towards Intendente Saguier
Location

Presidente Illia is a station on the Buenos Aires Premetro. It was opened on 29 April 1987 together with the other Premetro stations. The station is located in the Barrio of Villa Soldati.

At this station, passengers may transfer to the Metrobus Sur BRT and Belgrano Sur Line commuter rail line.
