= Fátima (Buenos Aires Premetro) =

Buenos Aires Premetro station

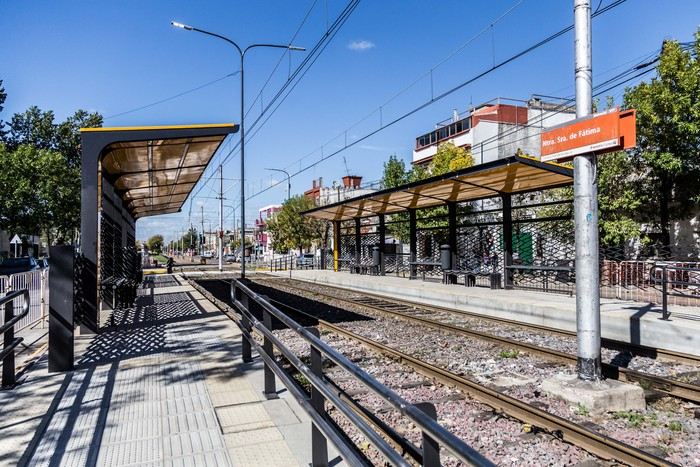

General information
- Location: Mariano Acosta and Barros Pazos
- Coordinates: 34°39′37″S 58°26′56″W
- Platforms: Side platforms

History
- Opened: 13 March 2000

Services
| Preceding station | Buenos Aires Underground | Following station |
|---|---|---|
| Fernández de la Cruz towards General Savio or Centro Cívico | Premetro | Ana María Janer towards Intendente Saguier |
Location

Nuestra Señora de Fátima (commonly known as Fátima) is a station on the Buenos Aires Premetro. It was opened on 13 March 2000 by the Buenos Aires Underground operator Metrovías and is one of only two Premetro stations (the other being Pola) to have been opened after the original inauguration of the Premetro in 1987. The station is located in the Barrio of Villa Soldati.

In 2015 the City of Buenos Aires presented plans to refurbish the station and underwent renovation (along with the remodelling of the Intendente Saguier terminus) to serve as the model station on which all the other Premetro stations will be based once they too are renovated. The station was reopened on 23 April 2016.
