= Parque de la Ciudad (Buenos Aires Premetro) =

Buenos Aires Premetro station

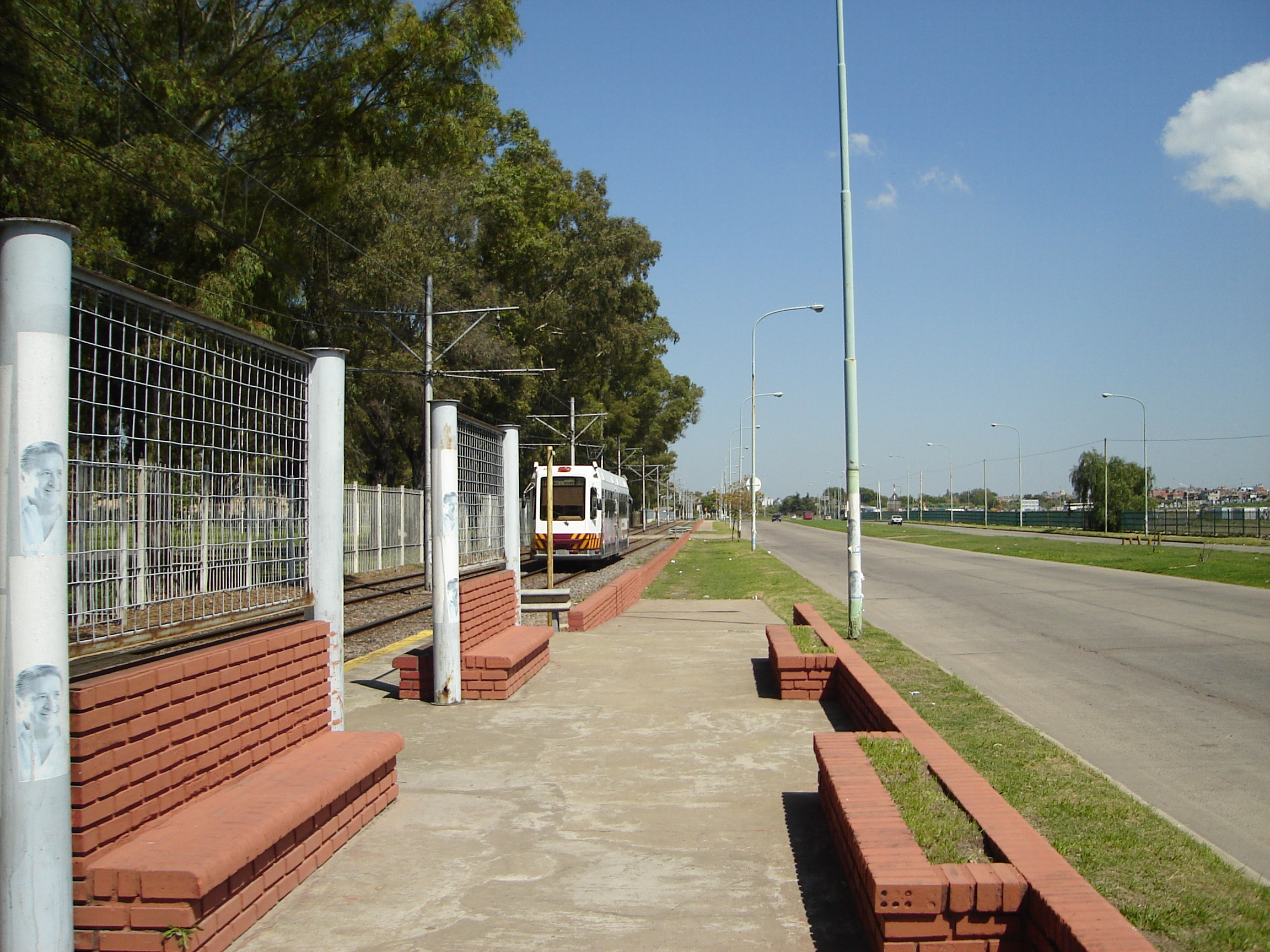

General information
- Location: Fernández de la Cruz 4000
- Coordinates: 34°40′12″S 58°27′18″W
- Platforms: Side platforms
- Connections: Metrobus Sur

History
- Opened: 29 April 1987

Services
Preceding station	Buenos Aires Underground	Following station
Cecilia Grierson towards General Savio or Centro Cívico	Premetro	Presidente Illia towards Intendente Saguier
Location

Parque de la Ciudad is a light rail station on the Buenos Aires Premetro. It was opened on 29 April 1987 together with the other Premetro stations. The station is located in the Barrio of Villa Soldati and serves the Parque de la Ciudad theme park.

At this station, passengers may transfer to the Metrobus Sur BRT line.
