= Mariano Acosta (Buenos Aires Premetro) =

Buenos Aires Premetro station

General information
- Location: Mariano Acosta and Castañares
- Coordinates: 34°38′16″S 58°27′23″W
- Platforms: Side platforms

History
- Opened: 29 April 1987

Services
Preceding station	Buenos Aires Underground	Following station
Somellera towards General Savio or Centro Cívico	Premetro	Balbastro towards Intendente Saguier
Location

Mariano Acosta is a station on the Buenos Aires Premetro. It was opened on 29 April 1987 together with the other Premetro stations. The station is located next to the Estadio Nueva España, the home ground of the Deportivo Español football team.
