= Balbastro (Buenos Aires Premetro) =

Buenos Aires Premetro station

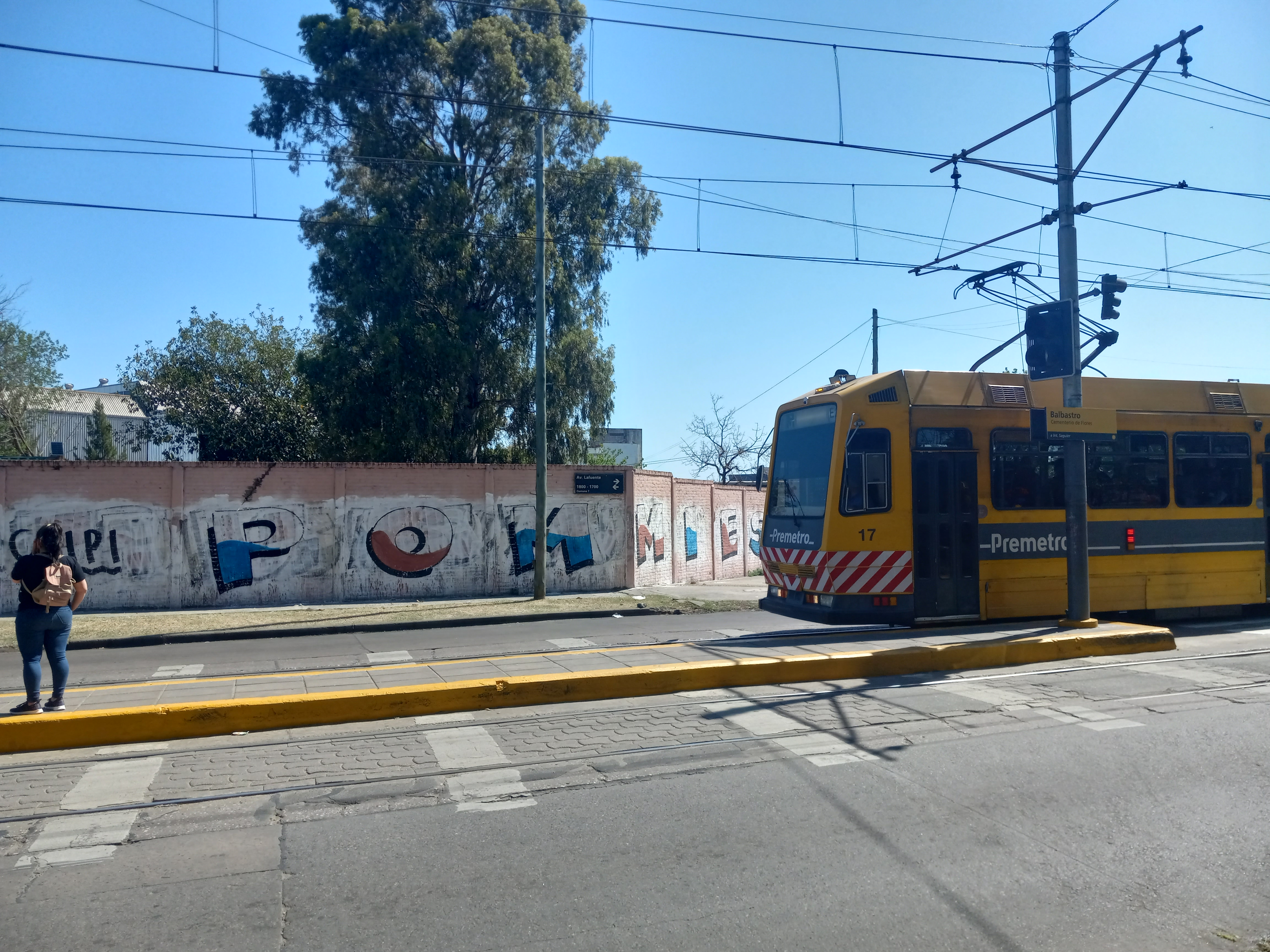

General information
- Location: Avenida Lafuente and Balbastro
- Coordinates: 34°38′58″S 58°27′20″W
- Platforms: Island platforms

History
- Opened: 29 April 1987

Services
Preceding station	Buenos Aires Underground	Following station
Mariano Acosta towards General Savio or Centro Cívico	Premetro	Intendente Saguier Terminus
Location

Balbastro is a station on the Buenos Aires Premetro. It was opened on 29 April 1987 together with the other Premetro stations.
