= Gabino Ezeiza (Buenos Aires Premetro) =

Buenos Aires Premetro station

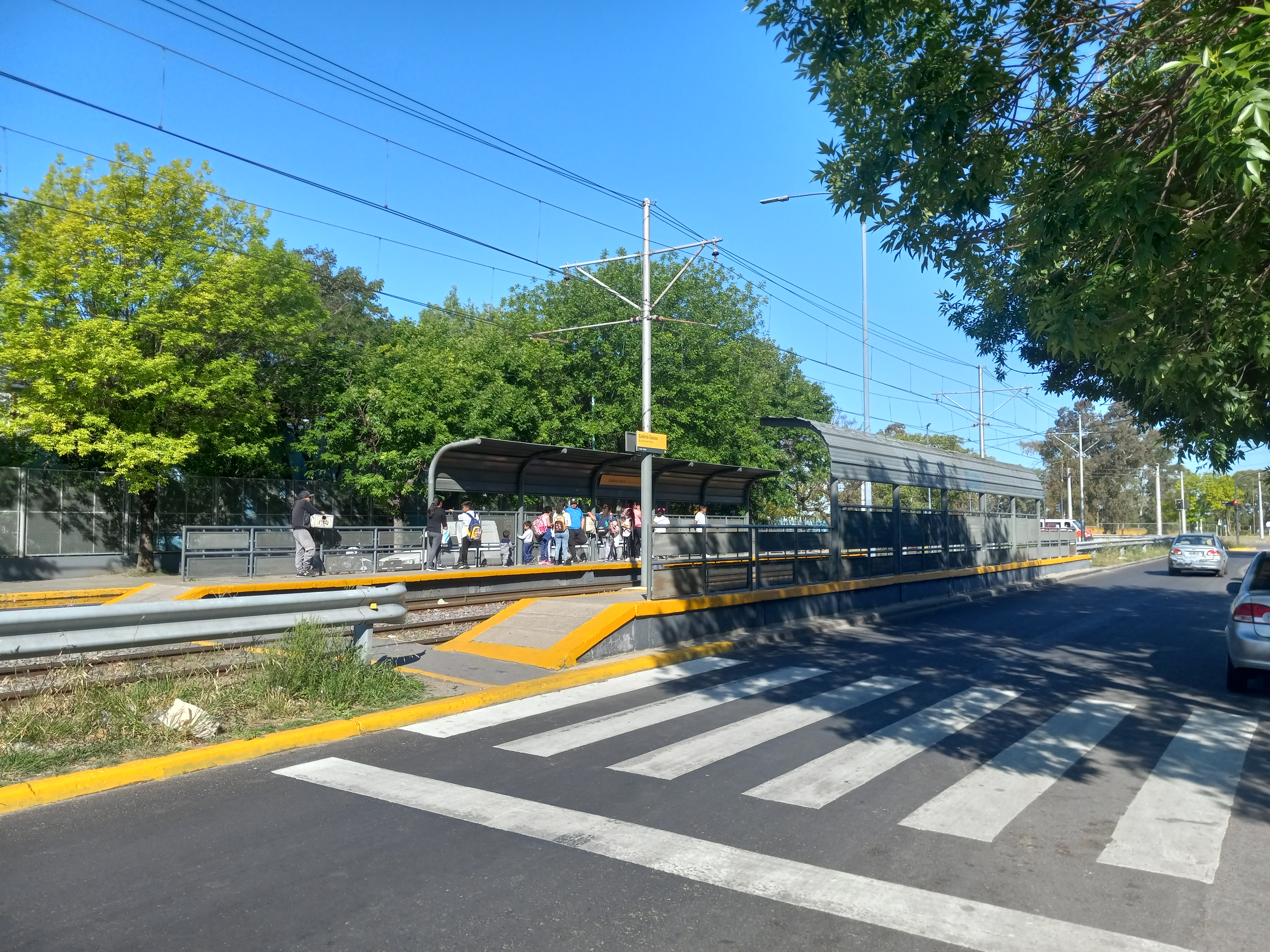

General information
- Location: Larrazábal and Coronel Roca
- Coordinates: 34°41′09″S 58°27′30″W
- Platforms: Side platforms
- Connections: Metrobus Sur

History
- Opened: 29 April 1987

Services
Preceding station	Buenos Aires Underground	Following station
General Savio Terminus	Premetro	Nicolás Descalzi towards Intendente Saguier
Location

Gabino Ezeiza is a station on the Buenos Aires Premetro. The station is on the branch that terminates at General Savio station. It was opened on 29 April 1987 together with the other Premetro stations. The station is located between the Barrios of Villa Lugano and Villa Riachuelo, near the Autódromo Juan y Oscar Gálvez.

From here passengers may transfer to the Metrobus Sur BRT line.
