= Ana Díaz (Buenos Aires Premetro) =

Buenos Aires Premetro station

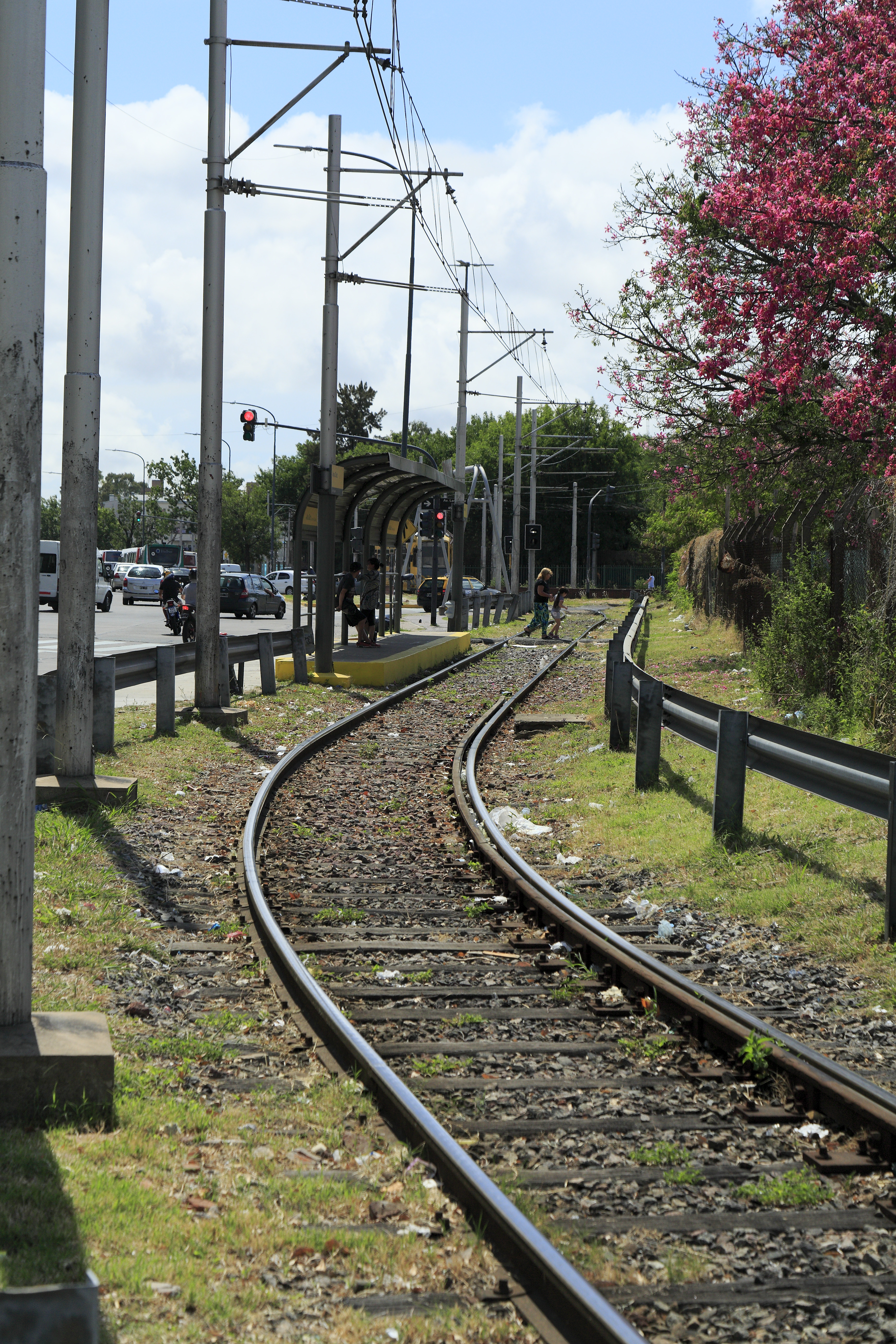

General information
- Coordinates: 34°40′50.2″S 58°28′01″W

History
- Opened: 29 April 1987

Services
Preceding station	Buenos Aires Underground	Following station
Centro Cívico Terminus	Premetro	Pola towards Intendente Saguier
Location

Ana Díaz is a Buenos Aires Premetro station. The station is located between Pola and Centro Cívico on the side branch leading to Centro Cívico. It was opened on 29 April 1987 together with most other stations of Premetro.
