= Pity (disambiguation) =

Pity is a sympathetic sorrow evoked by the suffering of others.

Pity may also refer to:

- Pity (film), 2018
- Pity (William Blake), a c. 1795 painting
- "Pity", a song by Arca from Sheep
- "Pity", a song by Drowning Pool from Sinner
- Pity Martínez, an Argentine football player
- Cristian Álvarez (musician), an Argentine musician
- Pity, name for a safety net system in gacha games
