= Mariano Acosta =

Mariano Acosta may refer to

- Mariano Acosta (politician) (1825–1893), vice president of Argentina
- Mariano Acosta (athlete) (born 1930), Argentinian sprinter
- Mariano Acosta, Buenos Aires, a city in Argentina
  - Mariano Acosta (Buenos Aires Premetro), a railway station
