= Manuel Savio =

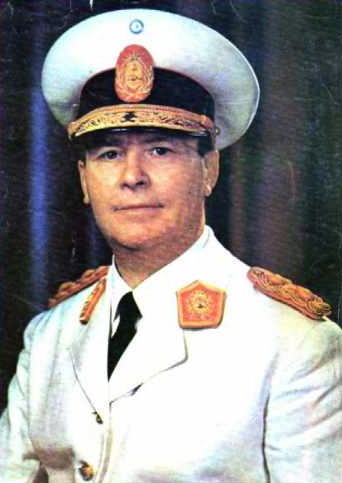
General Manuel Savio

Manuel Nicolás Aristóbulo Savio (Buenos Aires, 15 March 1893 – Buenos Aires, 31 July 1948) was an Argentine engineer and military man, noted for his contribution to Argentine heavy industry in his roles as general manager of Fabricaciones Militares and SOMISA.

== Biography ==
Savio enrolled in the Military Academy (Colegio Militar de la Nación) on 3 March 1909, and graduated as second lieutenant in 1910. He graduated as military engineer in 1931, and was promoted to colonel in 1936, brigadier-general in 1942 and full general in 1946.

Under Savio's auspices, the Higher Technical School ("Escuela Superior Técnica") was created in 1930, open to members of all armed services. Even though the coup d'état of September 1930 ousted and prosecuted General Enrique Mosconi, a pioneer of the Argentine petroleum industry, Savio was given free rein to pursue his projects. In time, Savio came to be perceived as Mosconi's rightful successor as the prime force behind Argentina's industrial progress.

Savio authored law number 12.709 in 1941 (under President Roberto Ortiz creating the General Directorate of Military Works ("Dirección General de Fabricaciones Militares", or DGFM) and was made its general manager. In this role, Savio was a main force in the erection of the Zapla Ironworks (Altos Hornos Zapla) in Jujuy Province, next to rich iron ore deposits.

From his post in DGFM, Savio also provided strong support for heavy chemical industry. The Río Tercero, José de la Quintana, and Tucumán plants were created under his watch. Savio established links to mechanical industries, and he supported Argentina's drive towards mining self-sufficiency. Savio also drafted plans for production of natural and synthetic rubber, and bills for ensuring the protection of raw materials.

The National Metallurgy Plan (law 12.987, year 1947, under President Juan Domingo Perón), which became known as the "Savio plan". That plan created SOMISA (Sociedad Mixta Siderúrgica Argentina), a mixed-capital society for the production of steel; Savio was SOMISA's first president.

Savio died in 1948, and many of his projects were halted. His main metallurgy plan was implemented long after his death by President Arturo Frondizi in 1958 with the establishment of the Punta Argerich plant (near Ramallo, Buenos Aires), which was later named after Savio.

General Savio is honored in Argentina as a pioneer of industry. Many technical schools, industrial complexes and places are named after him. In particular, many landmarks carry Savio's name in and around the metallurgy belt centered in Villa Constitución, Santa Fe.

== Works by Savio ==
- Industrial Movilization (Movilización industrial, 1933)
- Argentine Steel Policy (Política Argentina del acero, 1942)
- Policy of Argentine Metalworking Production (Política de la producción metalúrgica Argentina, 1944)
- Fundamentals of the Military Works law (Conceptos que fundamentaron el proyecto de la ley de Fabricaciones militares, 1944).

== Biography ==
- Larra, Raúl (1992). The Argentine who forged steel (El argentino que forjó el acero). Buenos Aires: Centro Editor de America Latina. ISBN 978-950-25-2375-0.

== Notes ==
This article incorporates content from Spanish wikipedia as of 26 Jan 2009
