= Emilio Mitre (Buenos Aires Underground) =

Buenos Aires Underground station

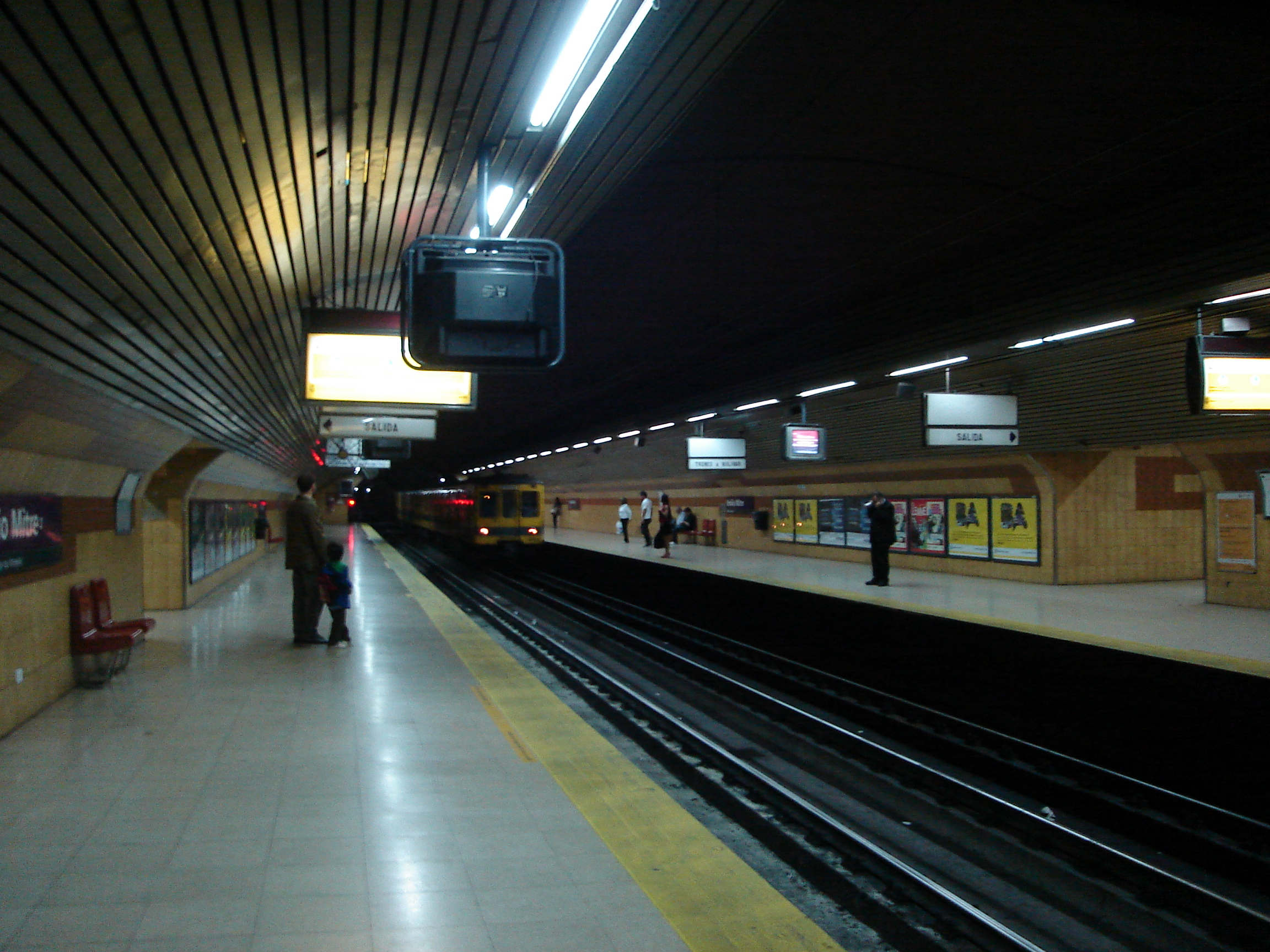

General information
- Location: Emilio Mitre 700
- Coordinates: 34°37′51.6″S 58°26′31.7″W
- Platforms: Side platforms

History
- Opened: 7 October 1985

Services
Preceding station	Buenos Aires Underground	Following station
Medalla Milagrosa towards Plaza de los Virreyes	Line E	José María Moreno towards Retiro
Location

Emilio Mitre is a station on Line E of the Buenos Aires Underground. The station was opened on 7 October 1985 as a one station extension from José María Moreno. On 31 October 1985, the line was extended to Medalla Milagrosa.
