= Cristian Álvarez (musician) =

Argentine musician (born 1972)

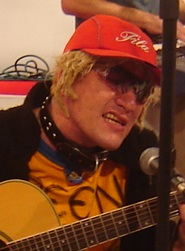
- Álvarez in 2006

Background information
- Born: 28 June 1972 (age 54)
- Origin: Buenos Aires, Argentina
- Genres: Rock Stone
- Occupations: Singer, songwriter
- Instruments: Guitar, vocals
- Years active: 1993–present
- Website: www.alvarezpity.com.ar

Cristian "Pity" Álvarez (born 28 June 1972) is an Argentine rock musician, a member of the rock bands Viejas Locas and Intoxicados.

== Career ==
Álvarez grew up in the Piedrabuena Complex, in the Villa Lugano neighbourhood of Buenos Aires. In 1993, he joined the rolinga rock band Viejas Locas. He left in 2000 to establish his current band Intoxicados.

=== Intoxicados ===
In 2001, Intoxicados released its first album, Buen día (Good day), which had a similar style to Viejas Locas, but also incorporated other genres such as punk and reggae. In Intoxicados' first concert, in Cemento in 2001, the band played mostly Viejas Locas songs with some of their own.

In 2003, the group released their second album, No es sólo rock and roll (It's not just rock and roll). The album included a song dedicated to Muddy Waters, called "De a ratitos". In 2005 they released Otro día en el planeta tierra (Another day on Planet Earth).

In September 2007, Intoxicados played at the Argentinian rock festival Pepsi Music.

Their fourth album was entitled Exilio de las especies, and Alvarez stated that it was the third part of a trilogy started by No es solo rock n' roll. This album includes the songs "Pila pila" and "Casi sin pensar". A special edition was released with space for the band's whole discography.

In summer 2010, Alvarez swallowed five tablets of viagra and was hospitalized for 24 hours. As result, he was diagnosed with necrosis among several other liver issues.

At dawn on July 12, 2018, police found the body of someone identified as an acquaintance of Álvarez, as well as a weapon belonging to the singer. According to a witness, Álvarez shot the victim four times before fleeing. Álvarez remained at large for approximately 24 hours before surrendering to the authorities, taking responsibility for the shooting but claiming it was in self-defense. The victim was subsequently named as Cristian Díaz.
