= Varela (Buenos Aires Underground) =

Buenos Aires Underground station

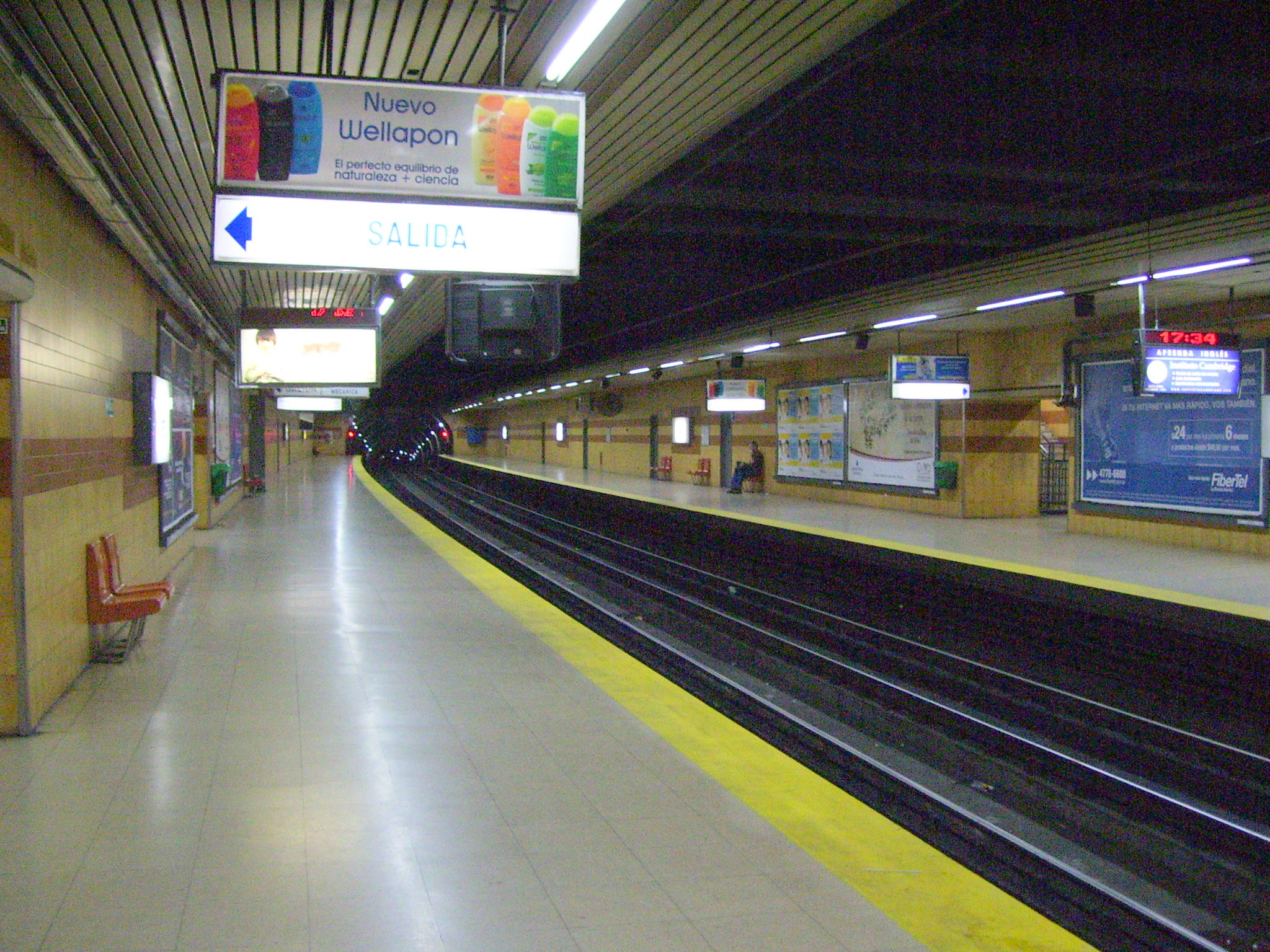

General information
- Location: Varela 900
- Coordinates: 34°38′24″S 58°27′28.9″W
- Platforms: Side platforms

History
- Opened: 27 November 1985

Services
Preceding station	Buenos Aires Underground	Following station
Plaza de los Virreyes Terminus	Line E	Medalla Milagrosa towards Retiro
Location

Varela is a station on Line E of the Buenos Aires Underground. The station was opened on 27 November 1985 as the western terminus of the one-line extension from Medalla Milagrosa. On 8 May 1986, the line was extended to Plaza de los Virreyes.
