= Medalla Milagrosa (Buenos Aires Underground) =

Buenos Aires Underground station

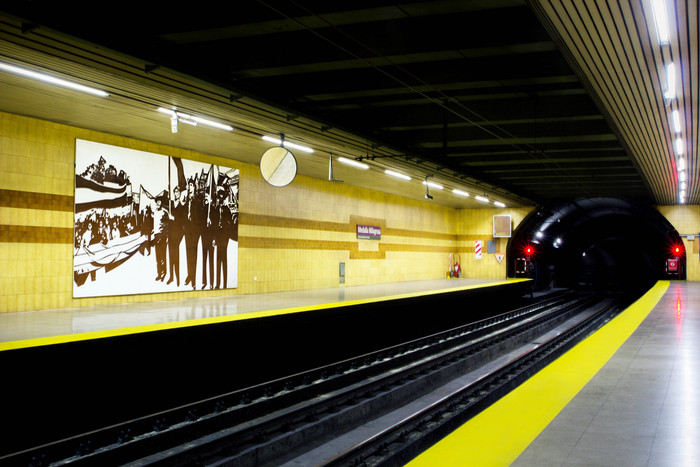

General information
- Location: Pumacahua 900
- Coordinates: 34°38′10.5″S 58°27′1.2″W
- Platforms: Side platforms

History
- Opened: 31 October 1985

Services
Preceding station	Buenos Aires Underground	Following station
Varela towards Plaza de los Virreyes	Line E	Emilio Mitre towards Retiro
Location

Medalla Milagrosa is a station on Line E of the Buenos Aires Underground. It is located at the intersection of Eva Perón and Pumacahua avenues. The station was opened on 31 October 1985 as the western terminus of the one-line extension from Emilio Mitre. On 27 November 1985, the line was expended to Varela. Medalla Milagrosa is near the small Koreatown of Buenos Aires.
