= Villa Lugano =

Coordinates: 34°41′S 58°28′W

- Neighbourhood of Buenos Aires
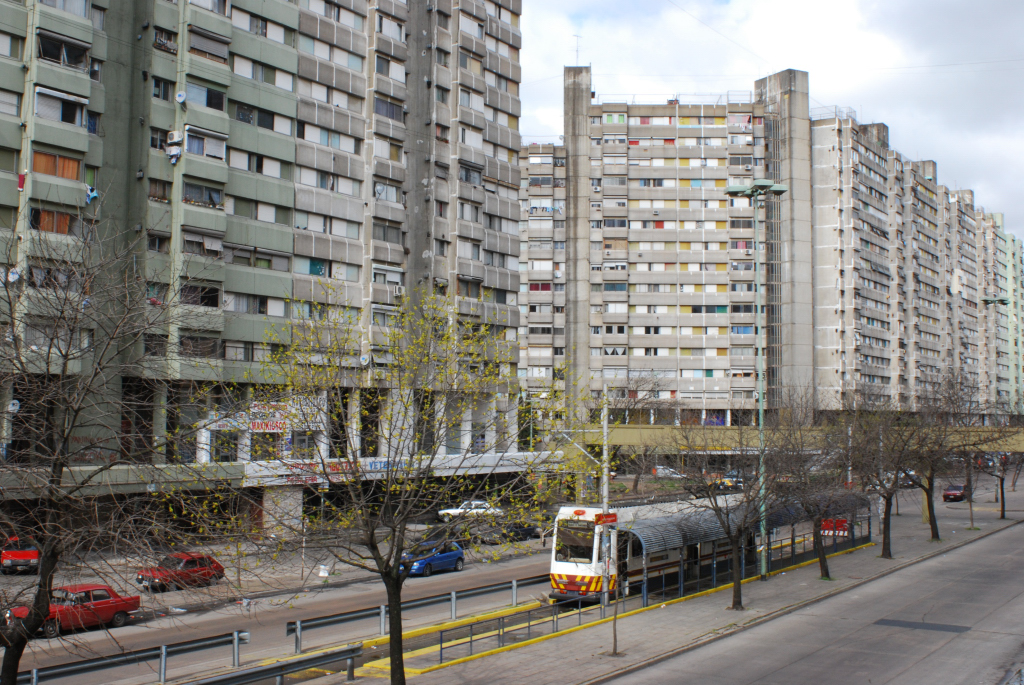
- The General Manuel Savio Housing Complex, one of the largest public housing works in Latin America
- Interactive map of Villa Lugano
- Country: Argentina
- Autonomous City: Buenos Aires
- Comuna: C8

Area
  - Total: 9.2 km^{2} (3.6 sq mi)

Population
  - Total: 114,253
  - Density: 12,000/km^{2} (32,000/sq mi)
- Time zone: UTC-3 (ART)

Villa Lugano is a barrio (neighbourhood) in Buenos Aires, Argentina, located in the south of the city. It has a population of approximately 114,000 people. It is delimited by Avenida Eva Perón, Avenida General Paz, Calle José Barros Pazos, Avenida Lisandro de la Torre, Avenida Coronel Roca and Avenida Escalada. To the south-east it limits with La Matanza Partido.

Generally a working-class neighbourhood, Villa Lugano is characterised by its numerous public housing complexes built in the late 20th century, such as Barrio General Manuel Savio (commonly known as Lugano 1 y 2), Barrio Cardenal Antonio Samoré, Barrio Cardenal Copello, and Barrio Comandante Luis Piedrabuena.

== History ==
Villa Lugano was founded in 1908, when Swiss citizen José Ferdinando Francisco Soldati (founder of Sociedad Comercial del Plata) established a settlement named for his hometown of Lugano. Soldati was born on 30 May 1864 in Neggio, Canton of Ticino, Switzerland, near Lugano. He bought a farm near the current location of Calle Murguiondo and Avenida Riestra. The lots were subdivided and with the sale of the first parcels, Villa Lugano was founded on 18 October 1908.

The Villa Lugano station of the French-owned Ferrocarril Compañía General en la Provincia de Buenos Aires was inaugurated in 1910; about 40 families lived in Villa Lugano by 1912. The low-lying area, known originally as the Bañado de Flores ("Flores Wetlands") grew slowly until flood control works were completed along the Cildañez Stream in the 1960s. It had developed a working class profile by then, and became the site of one of the city's largest villa miseria slums. Villa Lugano was chosen as the site of the General Manuel Savio housing development. Built by the Municipal Housing Commission between 1970 and 1973, the complex was the largest public housing development built in Buenos Aires, including over 12,000 housing units and becoming home to nearly 30,000 people. Bordering Villa Soldati to the east, Villa Lugano was separated from the former by municipal edict in 1972. The district was connected to the Buenos Aires Underground by the Pre-Metro, inaugurated in 1987.

== Education ==
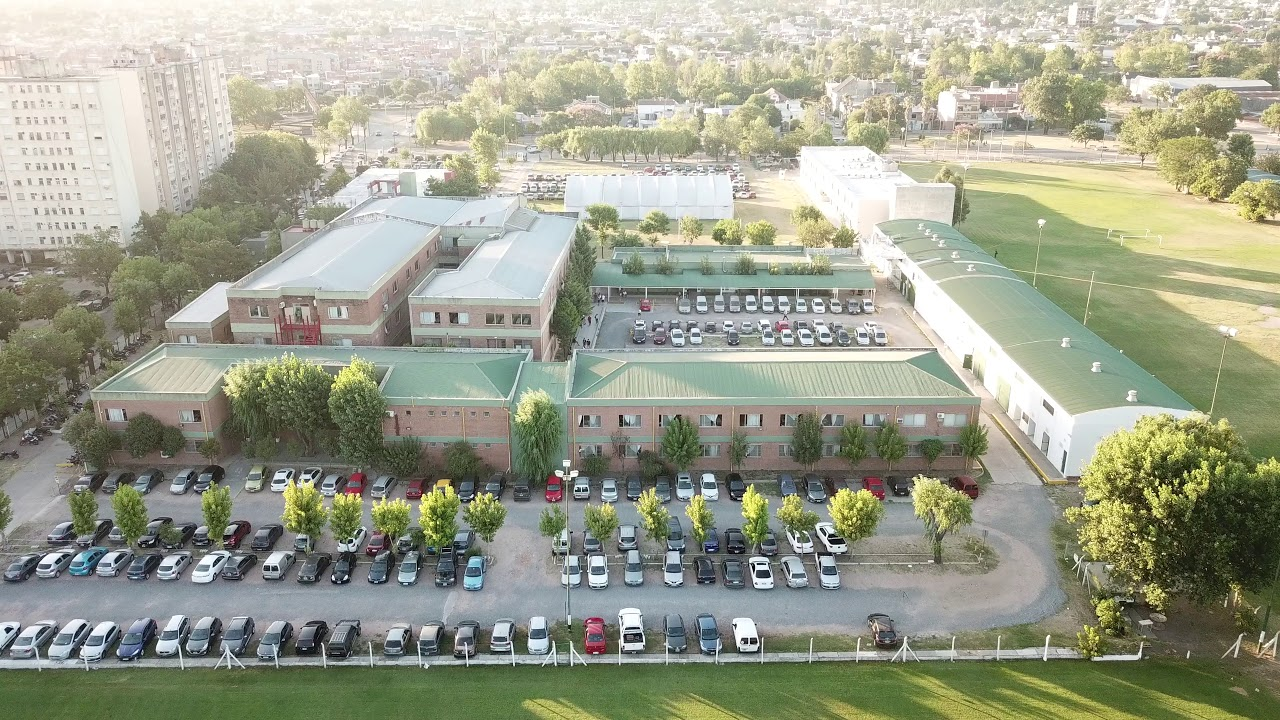
UTN Buenos Aires Regional Faculty.

The neighbourhood has a number of educational institutions ranging from primary schools to universities and other terciary education institutions. Villa Lugano is home to the main Buenos Aires regional campus of the National Technological University (UTN), Argentina's leading engineering-oriented university. Villa Lugano is also home to the University of Buenos Aires-affiliated Escuela Técnica, a high school specializing in technical education and one of the university's five secondary education institutions.

== Sports ==
Numerous sports institutions have their seat within Villa Lugano's borders, including the Club Social y Deportivo Yupanqui and the Club Atlético Lugano, both of which are known for their men's football teams in the Primera D Metropolitana and constitute the "Lugano derby", although neither club's stadia are located in the neighbourhood itself.

== Transport ==
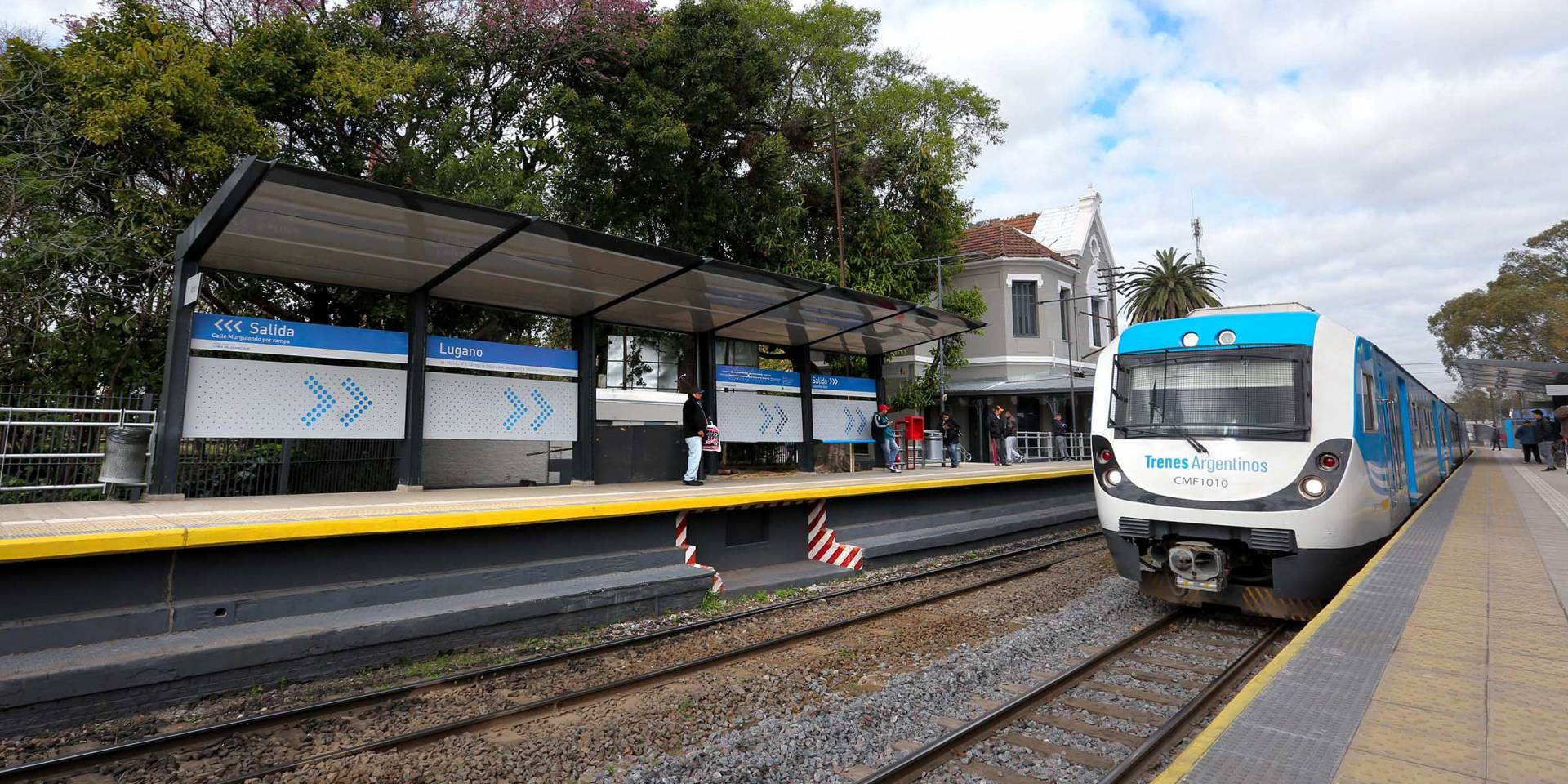
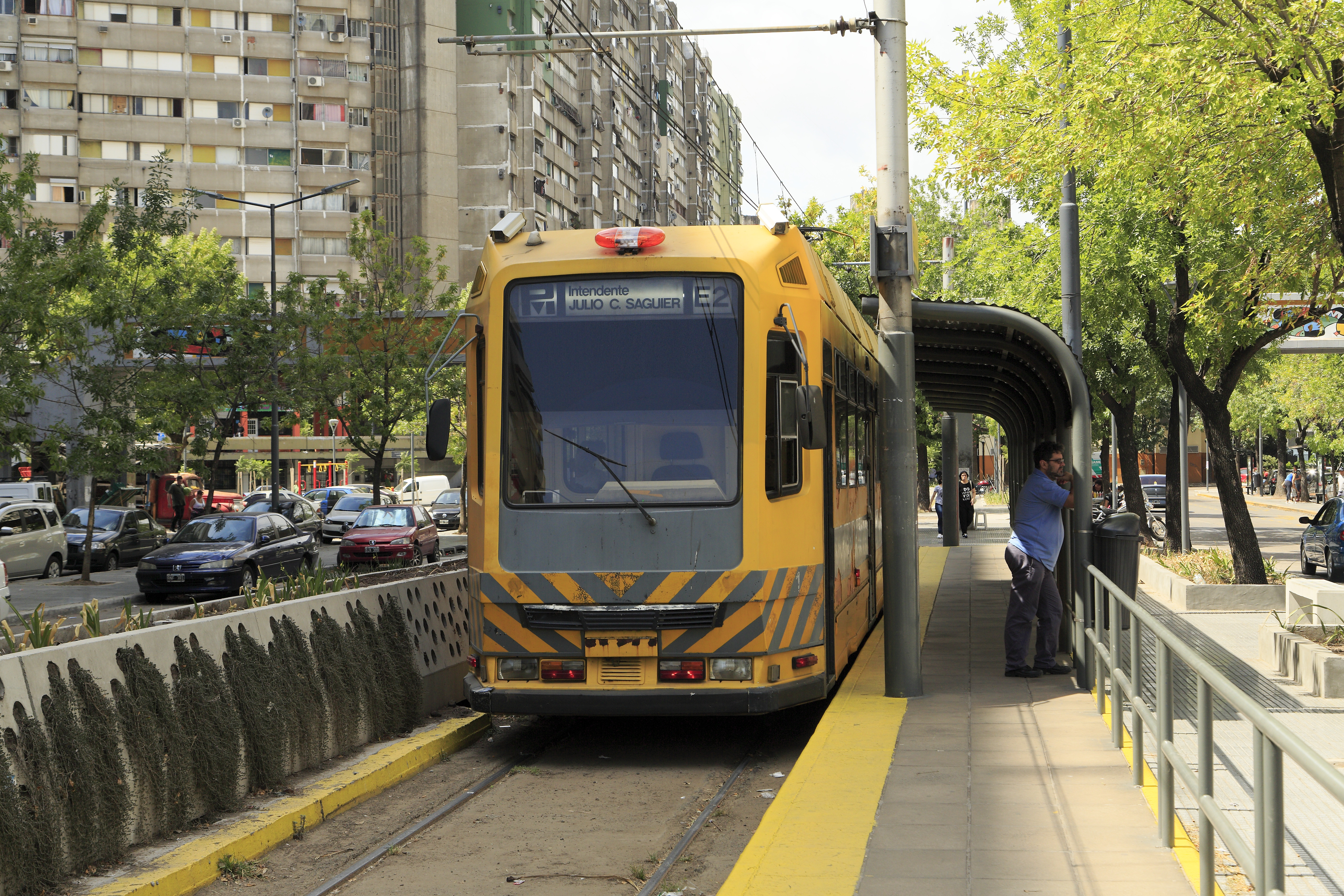
Lugano station of the Belgrano Sur Line (above), and Premetro at Centro Cívico station, in the heart of the Barrio General Savio housing complex (below).

Within the Greater Buenos Aires commuter rail network, Villa Lugano is served by the Lugano station of Belgrano Sur Line. In addition, most of the Premetro line of the Buenos Aires Underground runs through Villa Lugano, connecting the neighbourhood to the Underground network through Line E.

The neighbourhood is also served by the Sur Line of the Metrobús network of dedicated separated lanes and stations for mass-transit buses.

== Famous residents ==
The following people were born and/or raised in Villa Lugano, or resided in the neighbourhood during extended periods of time:

- Pity Álvarez (born 1972), rock musician
  - Viejas Locas and Intoxicados, the two rock bounds founded and led by Álvarez.
- Adrián Barilari (born 1959), heavy metal singer
- Claudio García (born 1963), footballer
- Gilda (1961–1996), cumbia singer
- Elena Lucena (1914–2015), film actress
- Antonio Roma (1932–2013), footballer
