= Centro Cívico (Buenos Aires Premetro) =

Buenos Aires Premetro station

Coordinates: 34°41′00″S 58°27′55″W

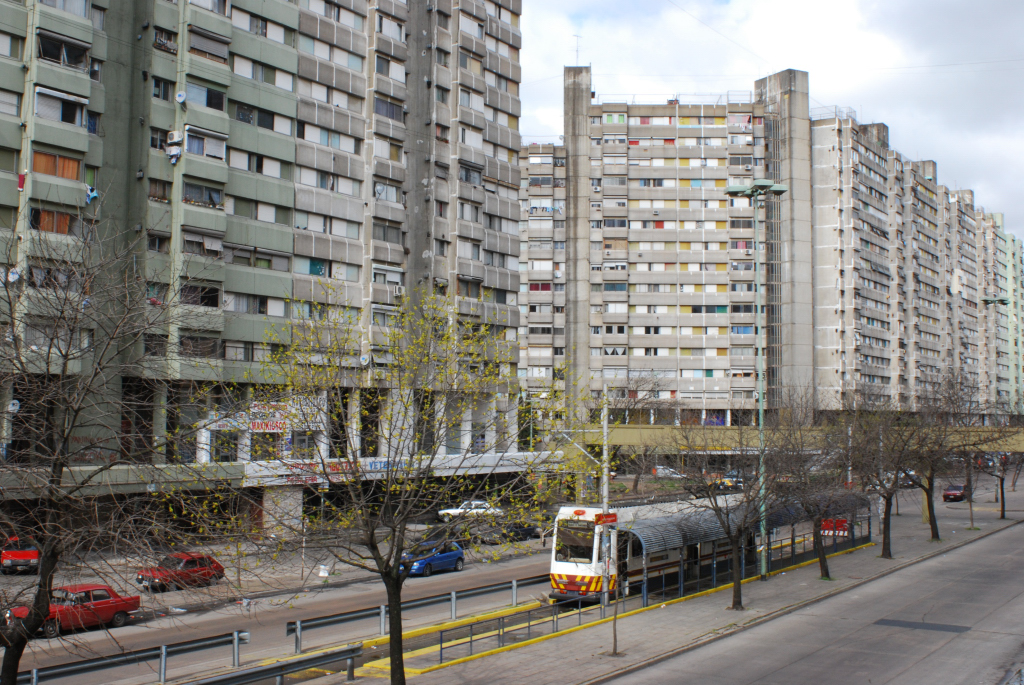
A tram/light-rail car at the terminus of the single-track branch to Centro Cívico on Buenos Aires "pre-metro" (light rail) line E2. The street is Avenida Soldado de la Frontera.

Centro Cívico is a Buenos Aires Premetro station, in Buenos Aires, Argentina, which serves as a terminus of a side branch. The adjacent station is Ana Díaz. The station was opened on 29 April 1987 together with most other stations of Premetro.

Preceding station	Buenos Aires Underground	Following station
Terminus	Premetro	Ana Díaz towards Intendente Saguier
