= General Savio (Buenos Aires Premetro) =

Buenos Aires Premetro station

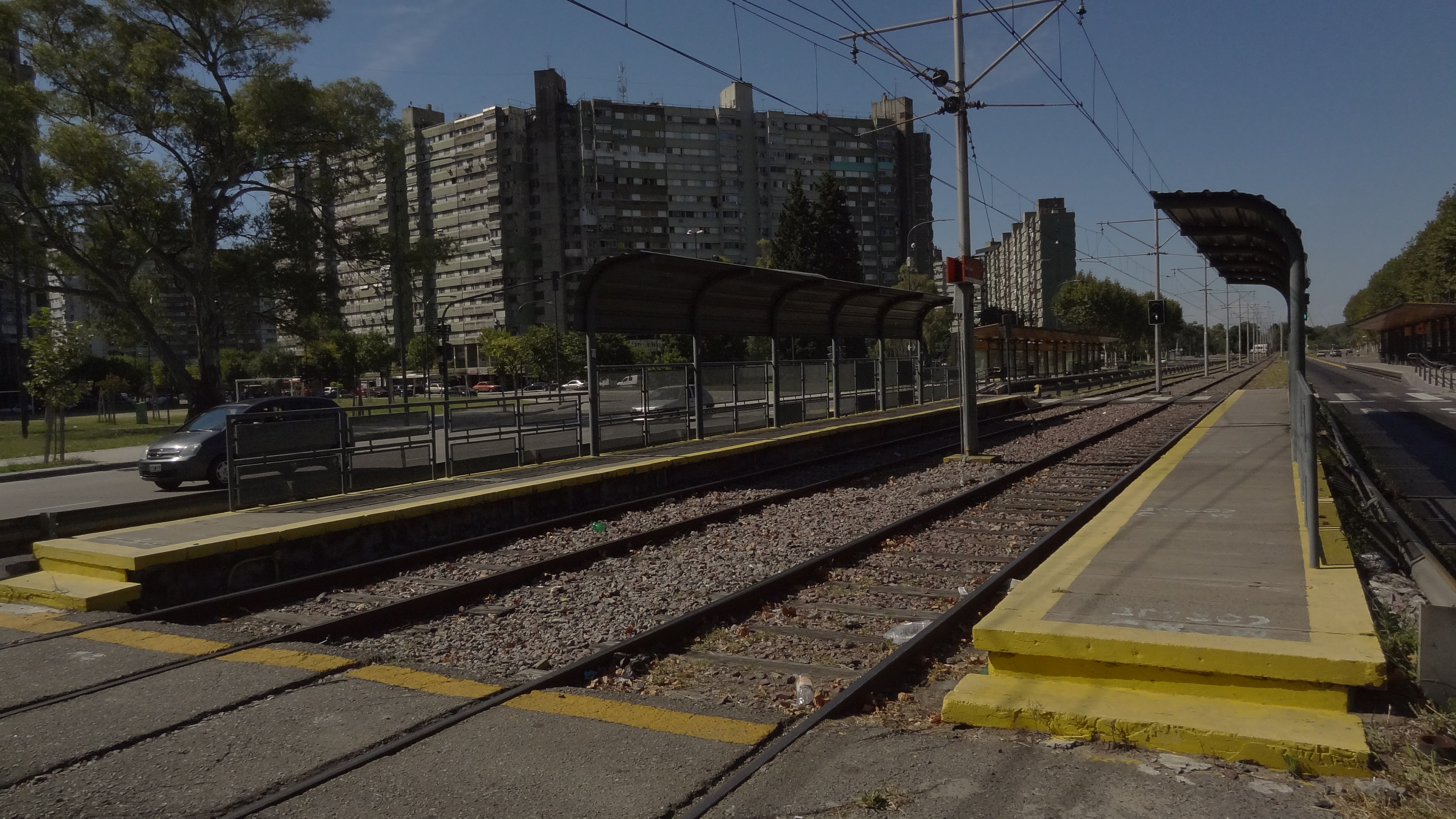

General information
- Location: Coronel Roca and Soldado de la Frontera
- Coordinates: 34°41′22″S 58°27′39″W
- Platforms: Side platforms
- Connections: Metrobus Sur

History
- Opened: 29 April 1987

Services
Preceding station	Buenos Aires Underground	Following station
Terminus	Premetro	Gabino Ezeiza towards Intendente Saguier
Location

General Savio is a station on the Buenos Aires Premetro. The station is on the branch that terminates at General Savio station. It was opened on 29 April 1987 together with the other Premetro stations. The station is located between the Barrios of Villa Lugano and Villa Riachuelo, near the Autódromo Juan y Oscar Gálvez. It is the terminal station on this branch of the Premetro.

From here passengers may transfer to the Metrobus Sur BRT line.
