= Intendente Saguier (Buenos Aires Premetro) =

Buenos Aires Premetro station

Intendente Pedro Luis Saguier
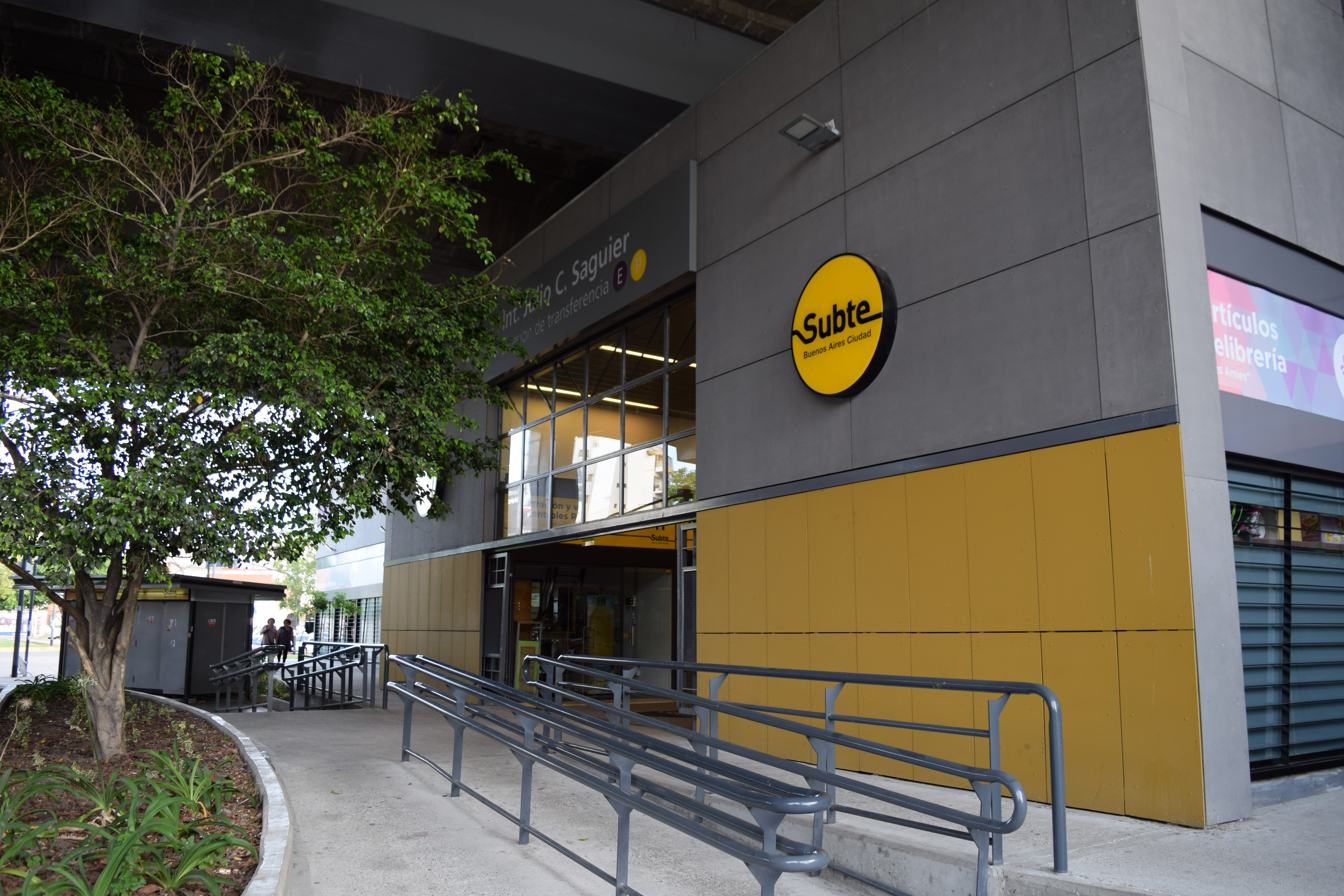

General information
- Location: Avenida Eva Perón and Avenida Lafuente
- Coordinates: 34°38′45″S 58°27′36″W
- Lines: and
- Platforms: Side platforms
- Tracks: 2
- Connections: Plaza de los Virreyes

History
- Opened: 29 April 1987

Services
Preceding station	Buenos Aires Underground	Following station
Balbastro towards General Savio or Centro Cívico	Premetro Transfer to: Plaza de los Virreyes	Terminus
Location

Intendente Pedro Luis Saguier (commonly referred to as Intendente Saguier) is a station on the Buenos Aires Premetro. It is the terminal station and connects with Line E at Plaza de los Virreyes. It was opened on 29 April 1987 together with the other Premetro stations.

It was announced in 2015 that the station would be completely rebuilt as part of plans to renew and refurbish the Premetro. The refurbished station was opened on 14 October 2015 and it was revealed that a second phase of construction will add a third set of rails and extend the existing platforms, as well as improving the area surrounding the station.
