= Premetro (Buenos Aires) =

Light rail system in Buenos Aires

Line P

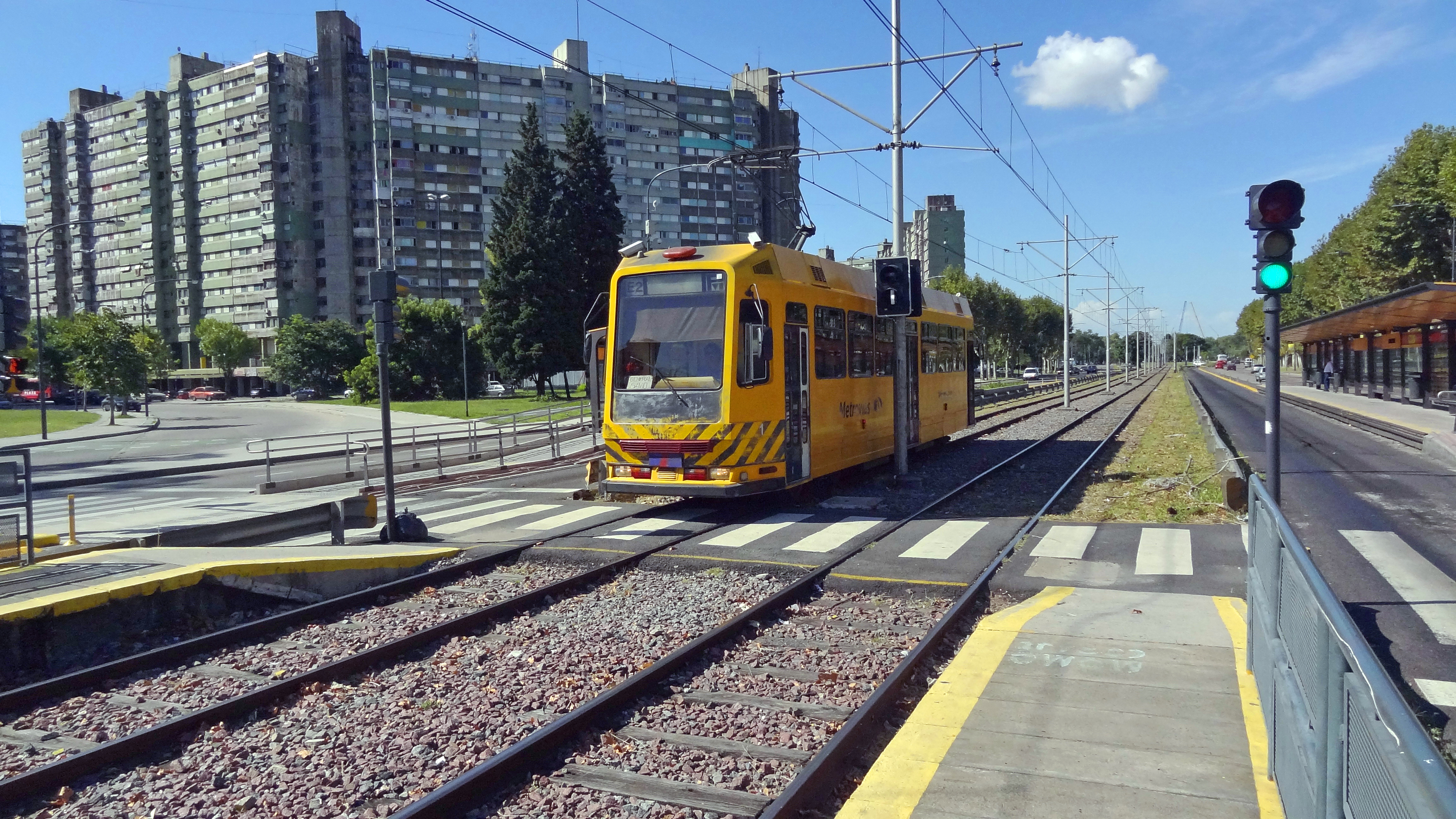
- Materfer tram at General Savio station

Overview
- Termini: Intendente Saguier; General Savio or Centro Cívico
- Stations: 17

Service
- Type: Light rail
- System: Subte
- Operator: Emova
- Daily ridership: 1,593 (2024)

History
- Opened: April 28, 1987

Technical
- Line length: 7.4 km (4.6 mi)
- Character: At-grade
- Track gauge: 1,435 mm (4 ft 8 1/2 in) standard gauge
- Electrification: Overhead line, 750 V DC

The Premetro, officially Line P, is a 7.4-kilometer-long (4.6 mi) light rail line that runs along the outskirts of Buenos Aires, connecting with the Buenos Aires Underground line E, at Plaza de los Virreyes station and then to General Savio, with a short branch to Centro Cívico. It opened in 1987 and is operated by Emova. Originally, the Premetro was to include many more lines, but shortly after the privatisation of the railways the projects were postponed and never materialised and only "Premetro E2" was built.

== History ==
=== Line E2 ===
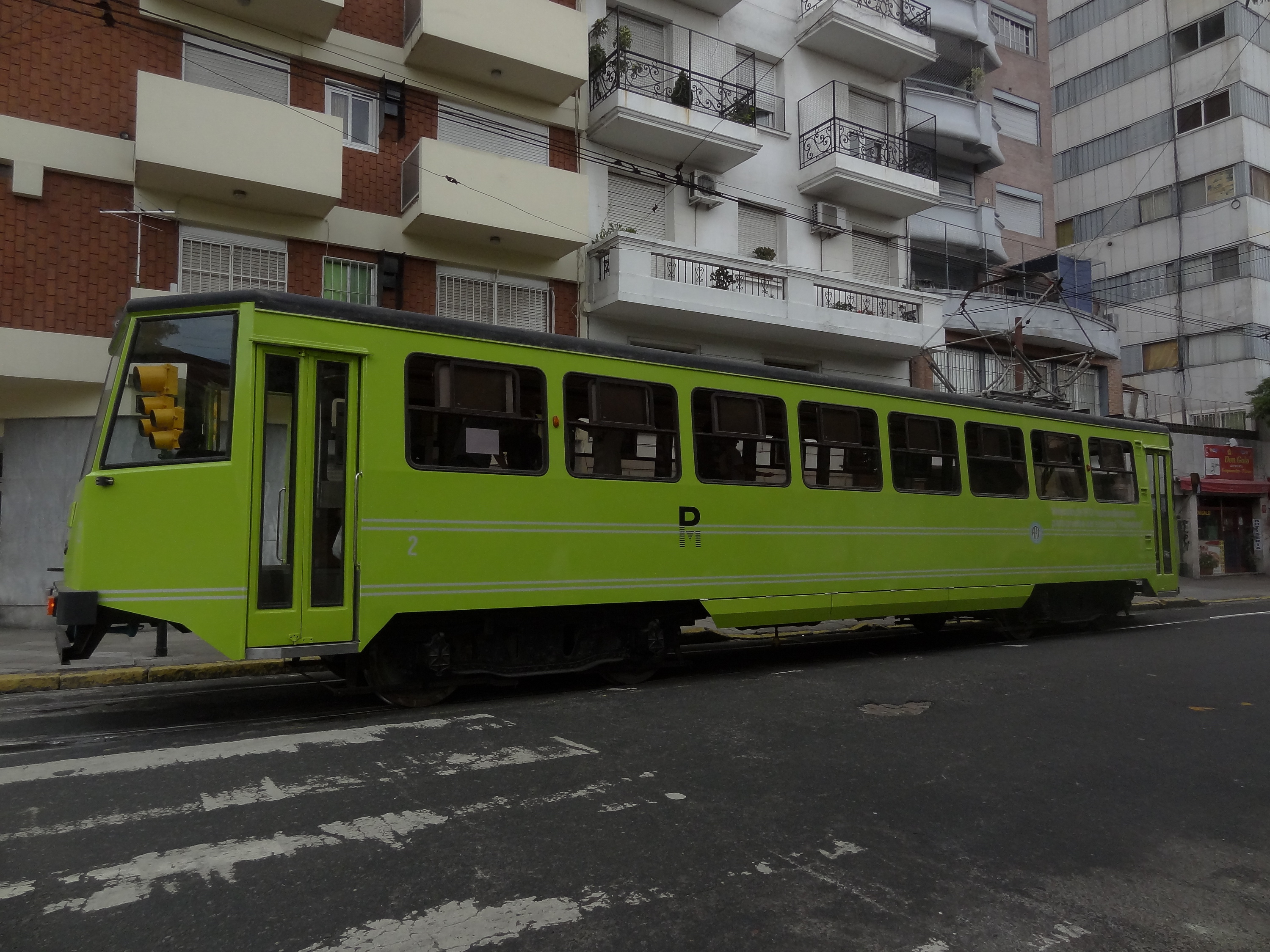
One of the refurbished La Brugeoise cars that ran temporarily on the line, now part of the Buenos Aires Heritage Tramway

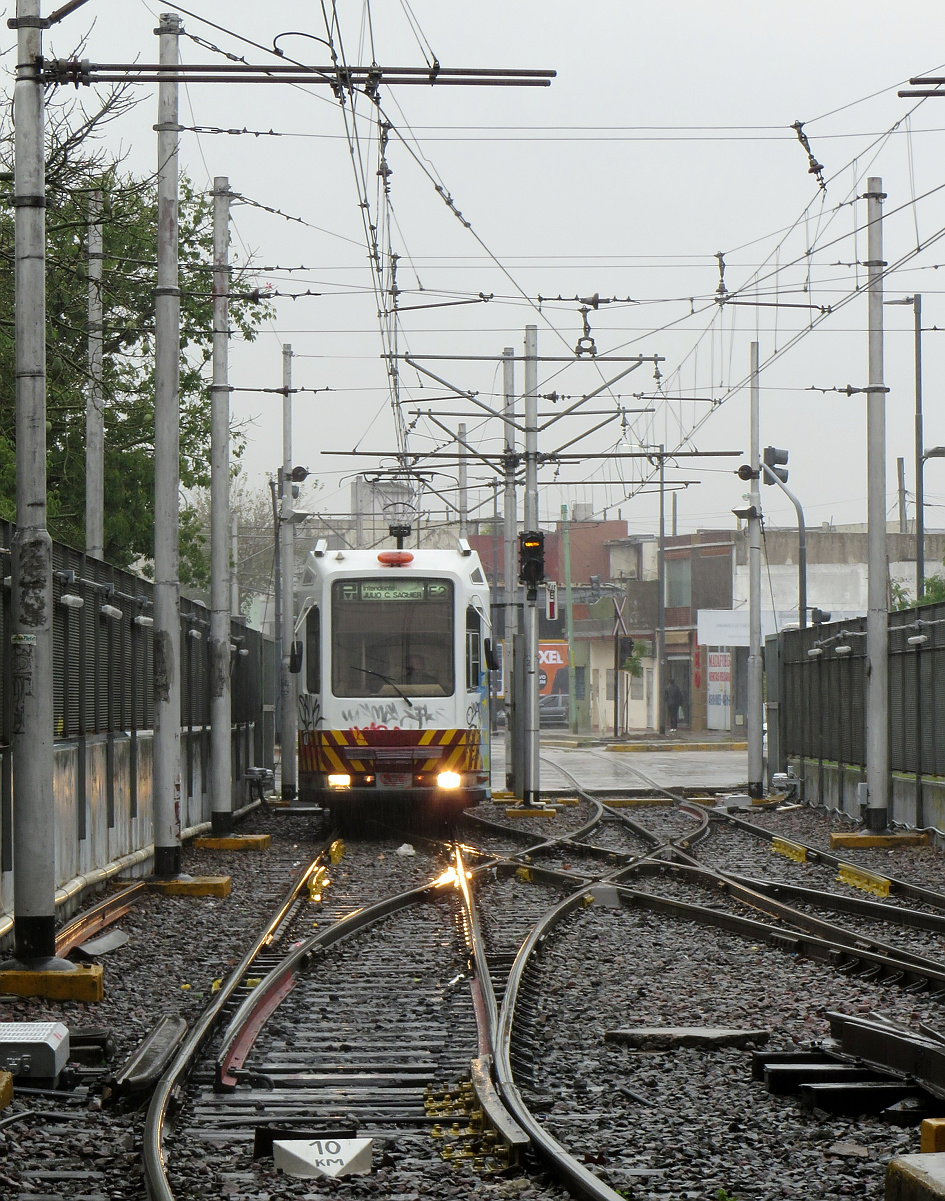
Materfer rolling stock leaving Plaza de los Virreyes

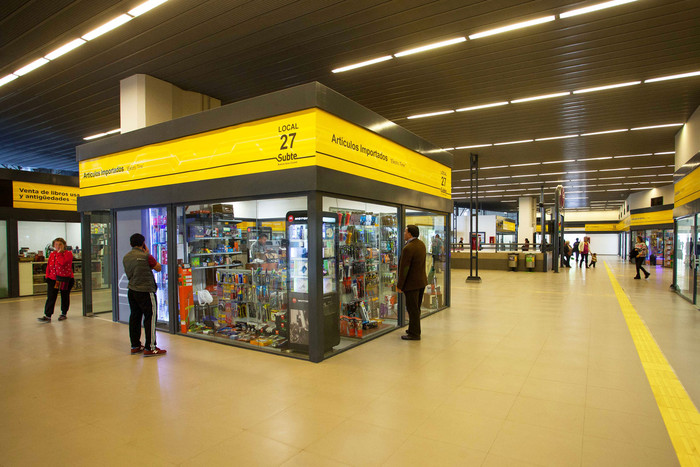
Interior of the Intendente Saguier terminal following refurbishment

The line opened in stages. The first section was opened for service on 28 April 1987. This was the 2 km section between the Plaza de los Virreyes metro station and Ana Maria Janer, near the line's carhouse. The service was extended to Villa Soldati in June and to General Savio on 25 August. A formal inauguration ceremony was held two days later.

The cost of constructing the line was US$5.4 million, and an additional $4.6 million was allocated to the acquisition of a fleet of 25 trams. A contract for the latter was awarded around the end of 1985 to a consortium led by the Argentine company Materfer (Fábrica de Material Ferroviario), of Córdoba, some of which were for a planned second line that was to be built later.

Delivery of the Materfer cars was originally due to begin in mid-1987, but it soon became apparent that they would not be ready until mid-1988 or later, which was well after construction of the line was completed. In order to avoid a long delay in the opening of the line, officials decided to create a temporary fleet by converting some 1913 metro cars into trams. They were double-truck (four-axle), non-articulated, double-ended (bidirectional) trams. A total of eight such cars were built, using new metal bodies manufactured in Buenos Aires by EMEPA S.A., mounted on the original 1913 Belgian-built La Brugeoise underframes. They were painted in a livery of all-over green. The first three of these inaugurated service on the first section of line E2 in April 1987.

The Materfer trams began to arrive in mid-1988, with six delivered by the end of the year. Their electrical equipment was supplied by Siemens. Like the temporary cars rebuilt from metro cars, the Materfer/Siemens trams are double-truck, double-ended cars. They have seating for 24 passengers and room for around 115 standees. They have three doors on each side. The low-platform stops along the line are long enough to accommodate only one car at a time, and multiple-unit operation is not planned, so the tramcars are not equipped with couplers.

The first Materfer cars entered service on 14 October 1988. In 1989, both types of car were still in service, but eventually the Materfer cars replaced all of the rebodied metro cars. By April 1991, 20 of the 25 cars had been delivered (fleet numbers PM 1–20), and the last five were reported as being completed but still at the factory in Córdoba. However, the scheduled service needed only six cars. As of 2001, normal peak service still required only six to eight cars.Metrovías became the line's operator on 1 July 1993, under a franchise agreement.

=== Other planned lines ===
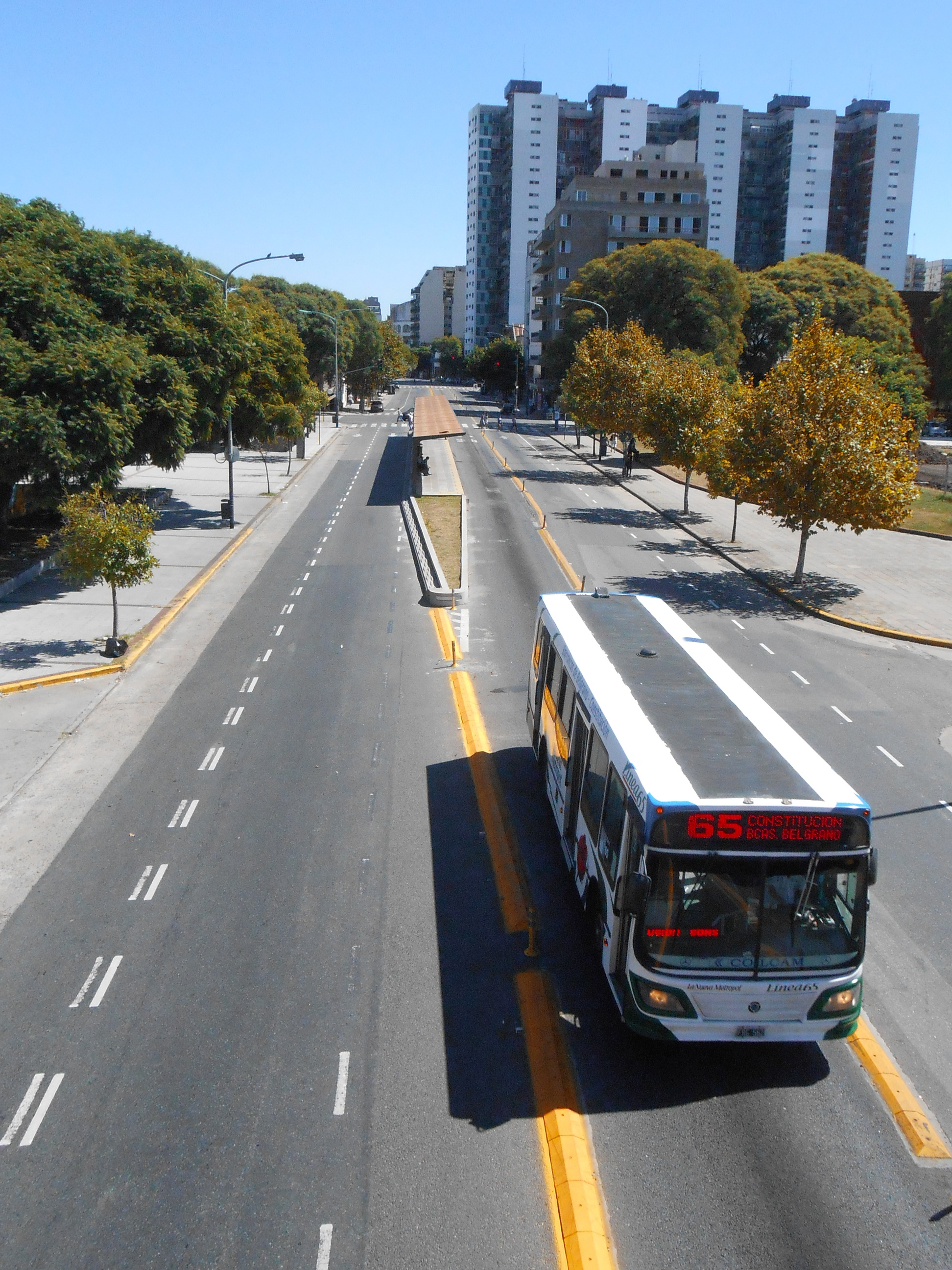
The Metrobus network has replaced many of the originally planned Premetro lines.

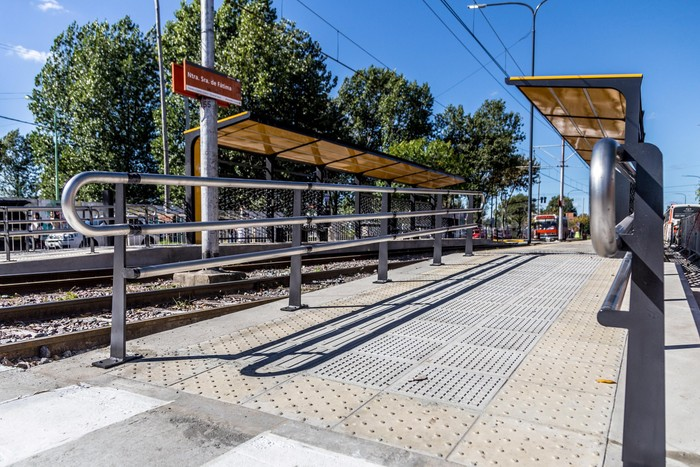
Fátima station was refurbished in 2016 and other stations will be based on this design.

The original PreMetro plan developed in the late 1980s included the building of two or three more additional lines, however due to the timing of these projects having coincided with railway privatisation in Argentina, only PreMetro E2 materialised before the Buenos Aires Underground network was privatised and investment ground to a halt for the following two decades. Much like PreMetro E2, the naming of the PreMetro lines would have shared the letter of their corresponding Underground line along with a number depending on how many PreMetro lines corresponded to that Underground line.

With Line E of the Underground, PreMetro E2 was the first phase of the project with the construction of PreMetro E1 being the second phase. This line would have extended out from the end of Line E eastwards to the limits of the city proper with Greater Buenos Aires. However, this never materialised following privatisation and the building of the Metrobus Sur in 2013 rendered the building of the line obsolete since it covered the same area and route, with the added benefit of going directly to the city centre without needing to transfer to Line E.

While the Metrobus Sur was still in the planning stages, it had been proposed in 2012 to create a Premetro H1 line extending from the terminus of Underground Line H to the edge of the city proper, connecting with Premetro E2 at its General Savio terminus, giving the benefit over the originally planned E1 line in that it would create a loop between Underground lines E and H. In the end though, the Metrobus was established instead of Premetro H.

Plans for other lines included PreMetro D1 in the 1980s, which would have departed from the final station of Line D to the limits of the city proper. In 2015, this became a reality with the opening of Metrobus Cabildo rather than a tram service.

There would also have been a PreMetro C1 which would have connected with Line C and the Roca Line at Constitución railway station and headed northwards to Retiro railway station (parallel to Line C, but further east) and eastwards to Puerto Madero. The current extension of Line E northwards to Retiro replaced this, but not the Puerto Madero section, which was briefly covered by the experimental Tranvia del Este.

=== Recent developments ===
In 2023, Subterráneos de Buenos Aires (SBASE) put out to tender the renovation of several Premetro stations. Intermediate stations Presidente Illia, Parque de la Ciudad, Escalada, Pola, and Ana Díaz, along with terminal stations General Savio and Centro Cívico Lugano, were to be entirely reconstructed. Additionally, the stations of Nuestra Señora de Fátima and Intendente Saguier were to be renovated, due to having been renovated in previous years. These renovations were completed in October of 2024.

In July of 2024, SBASE launched a tender to connect the terminal stations of Centro Cívico Lugano and General Savio to unify the two branches of the system into a single loop. The works include the construction of 850 meters (roughly half a mile) of tracks, the construction of three new stations, the demolition of reconstruction of the General Savio station, and the renovation of the Larrazábal, Nicolas Descalzi, and Gabino Ezeiza stations. This project will be the first extension of the Premetro system since its opening in 1987, and will simplify service and increase frequencies throughout the system.

=== Closure announcement ===
On December 1, 2025, Jorge Macri confirmed during a live broadcast of Economía de Quincho program he plans to replace the Premetro with electric buses called Trambús, stating the service was very deficient. He said "On the Premetro route today it's much easier to put an electric bus, a Trambús" describing it as a "Very small train that carries few people" and adding, "We already have the route built; we can put another type of vehicle there."

On December 27, 2025, a protest was organized against the closure of the Premetro, starting at the Intendente Saguier station and continuing to the Centro Cívico station for the closing demonstration. This movement involved users of the Premetro, workers of the Buenos Aires Underground and rail transport enthusiasts, demanding this service should be modernized and its pending works should be completed, such as the closure of its loop, and reaching Avenida General Paz and Puente de la Noria. Subsequently, the City government backtracked and put the Premetro closure project on hold.

== Description and service ==
Line E2 passes through many poorer areas, but travel on the line is generally safe. As of 2001, service was being provided from 7:00 to 22:00, matching the hours of the line E underground service, on a headway varying between 5 and 10 minutes depending on the time of day. Most of the line is double-track, but the short branch to Centro Cívico is single-track. The line includes sections of private right-of-way, sections of reserved track (in the median of streets, but separated from other traffic) and street-running in mixed traffic. The carhouse (maintenance facility) for the line is located along Avenida Mariano Acosta, adjacent to the Somellera stop.

== Gallery ==
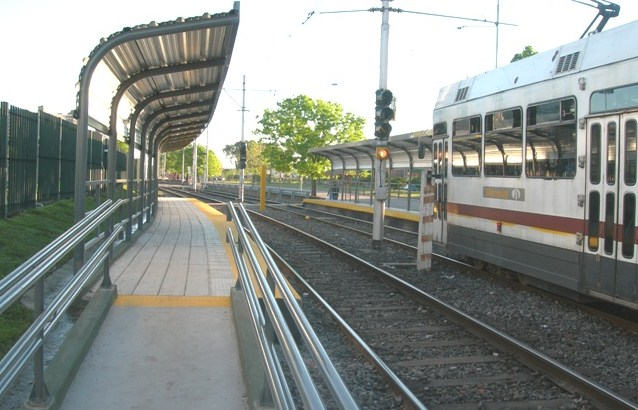
Tram at Pola station

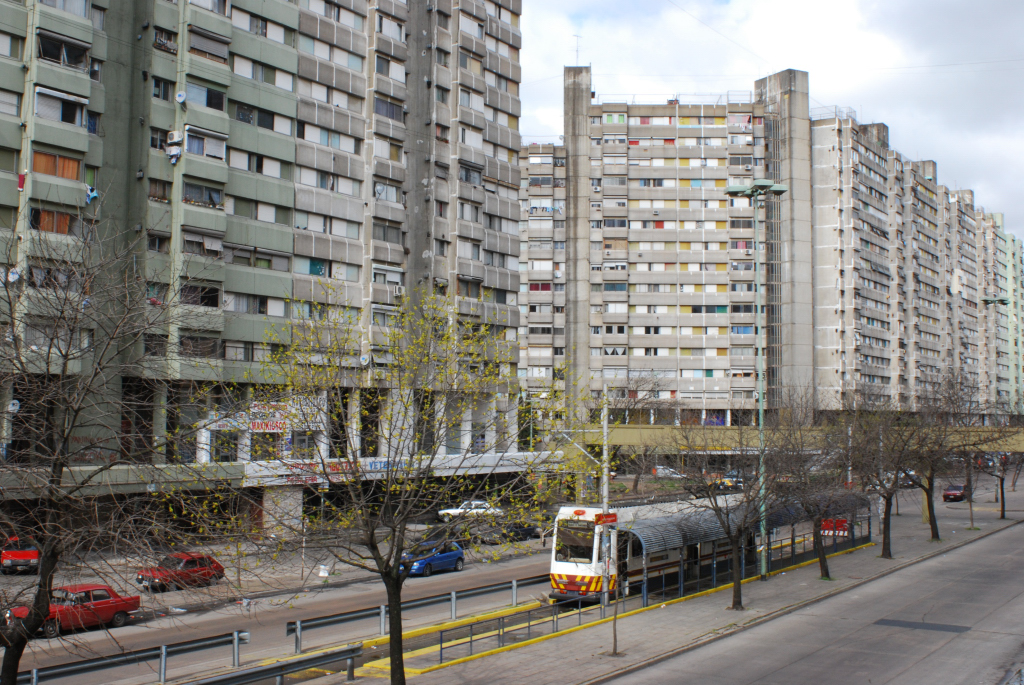
A tram/light-rail car at the end of the line's single-track branch, to Centro Cívico

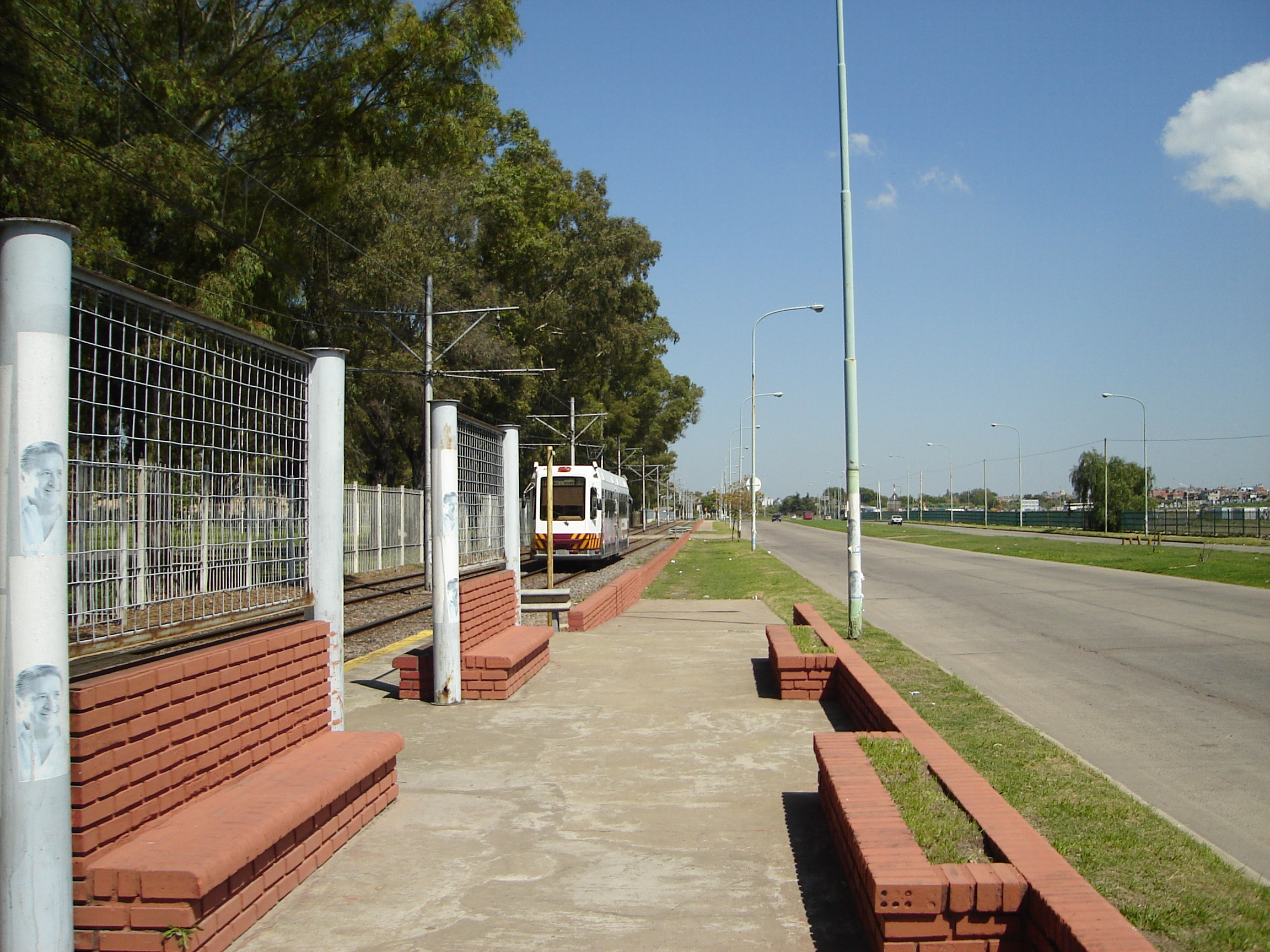
Tram in Parque de la Ciudad station

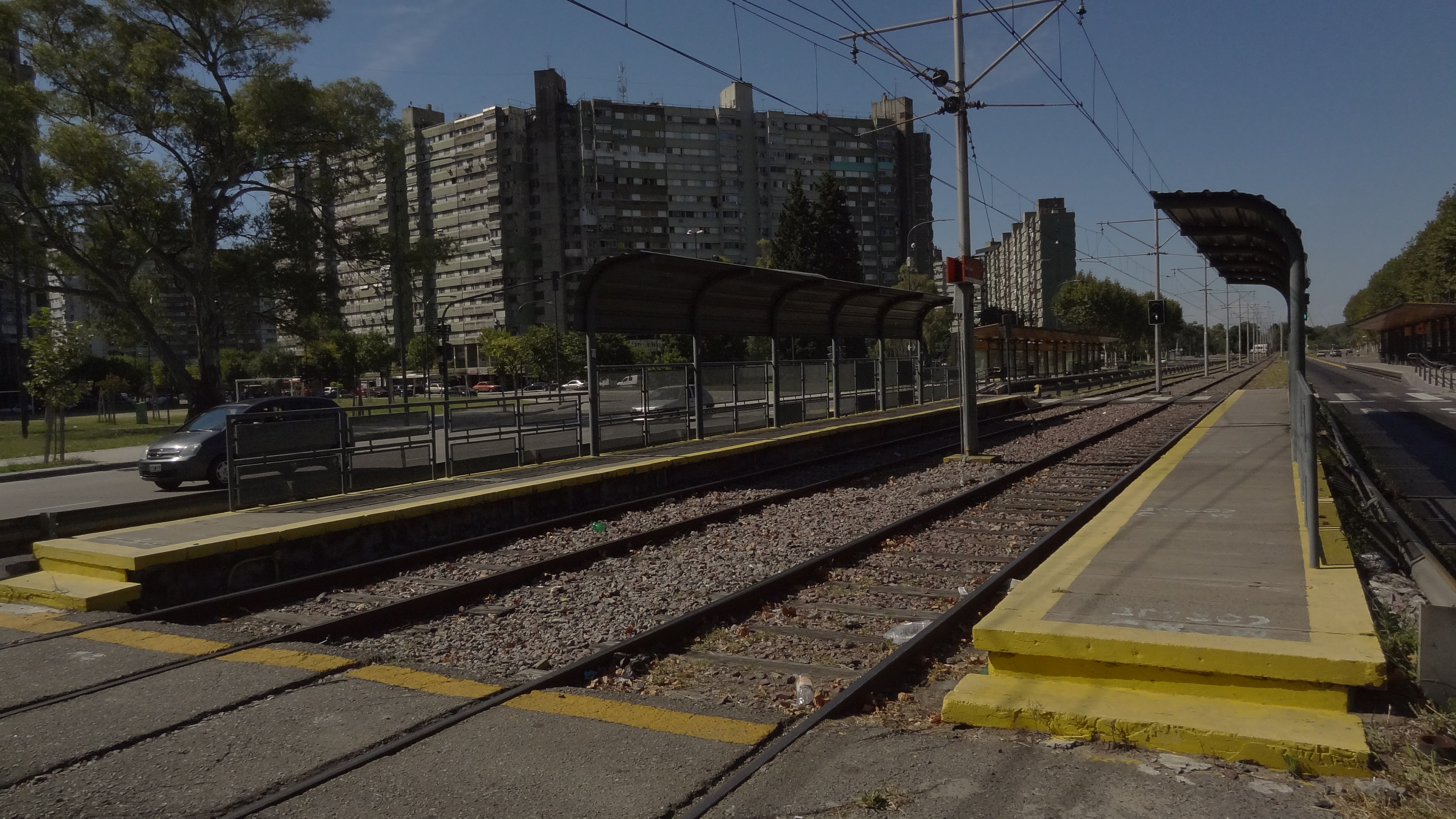
General Savio station

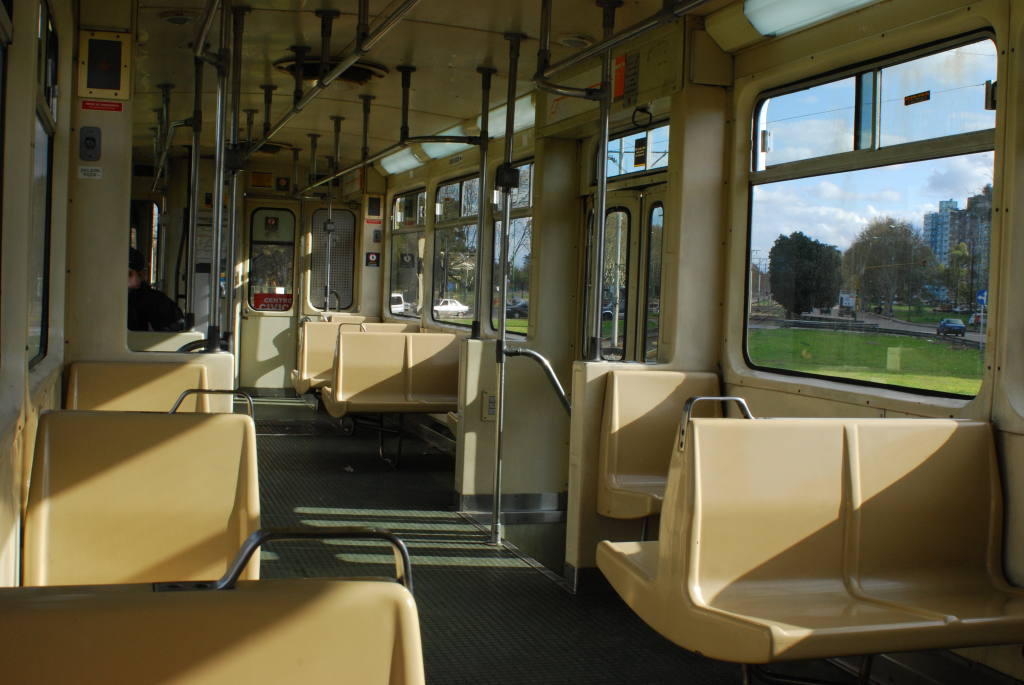
Interior of one of the trams

== See also ==
- Trams in Buenos Aires
- Tren de la Costa - Another light rail line in Buenos Aires
- Tranvía del Este - Former modern tram line in Puerto Madero area (closed in 2012)
- Buenos Aires Underground
- La Brugeoise cars (Buenos Aires Underground)
