= Loria (Buenos Aires Underground) =

Buenos Aires Underground station

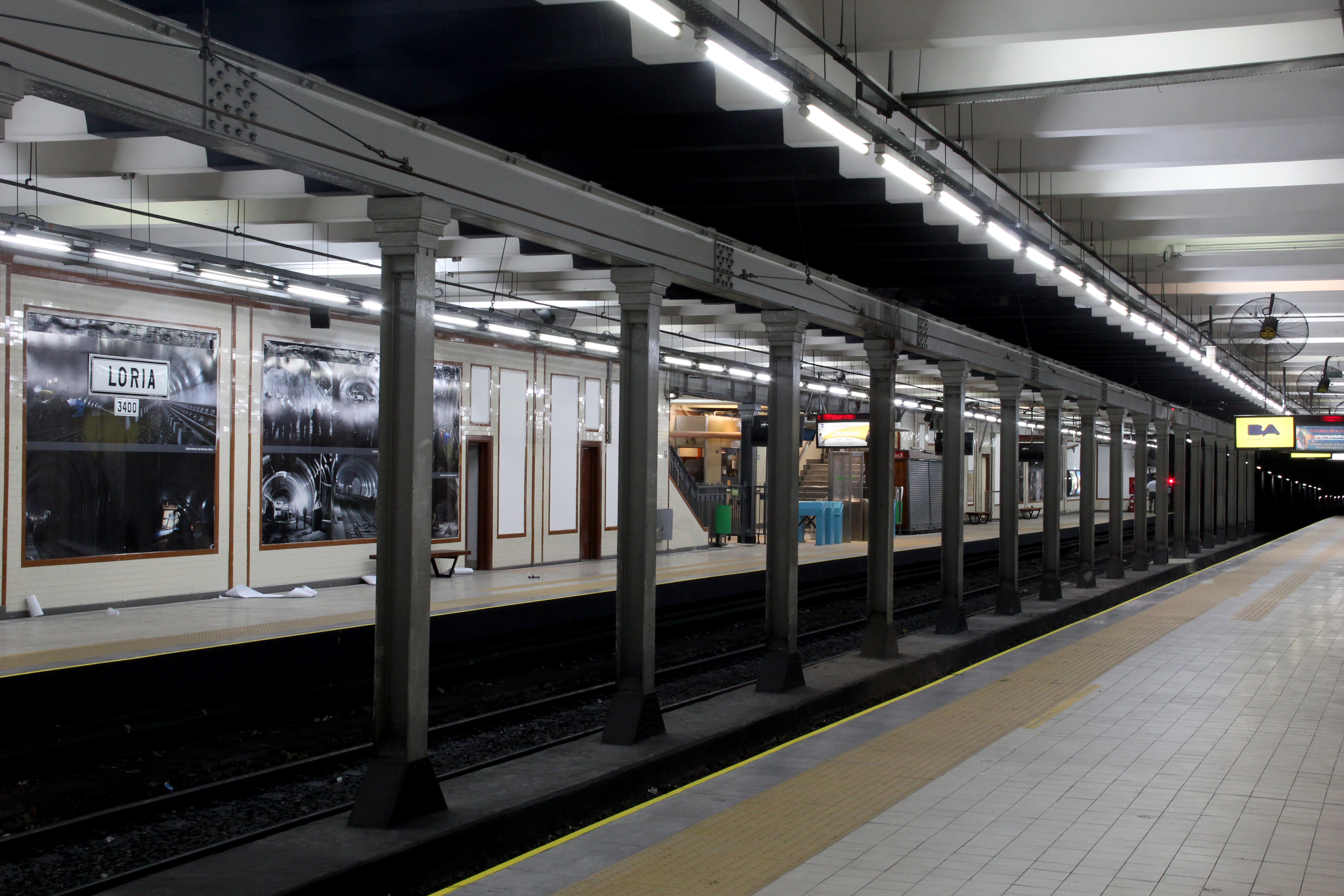

General information
- Location: Avenida Rivadavia and Sánchez de Loria
- Coordinates: 34°36′38.9″S 58°24′54.4″W
- Platforms: Side platforms

History
- Opened: 1 April 1914

Services
Preceding station	Buenos Aires Underground	Following station
Castro Barros towards San Pedrito	Line A	Plaza Miserere towards Plaza de Mayo
Location

Loria is a station on Line A of the Buenos Aires Underground. The station was opened on 1 April 1914 as part of the extension of the line from Plaza Miserere to Río de Janeiro.
