= Castro Barros (Buenos Aires Underground) =

Buenos Aires Underground station

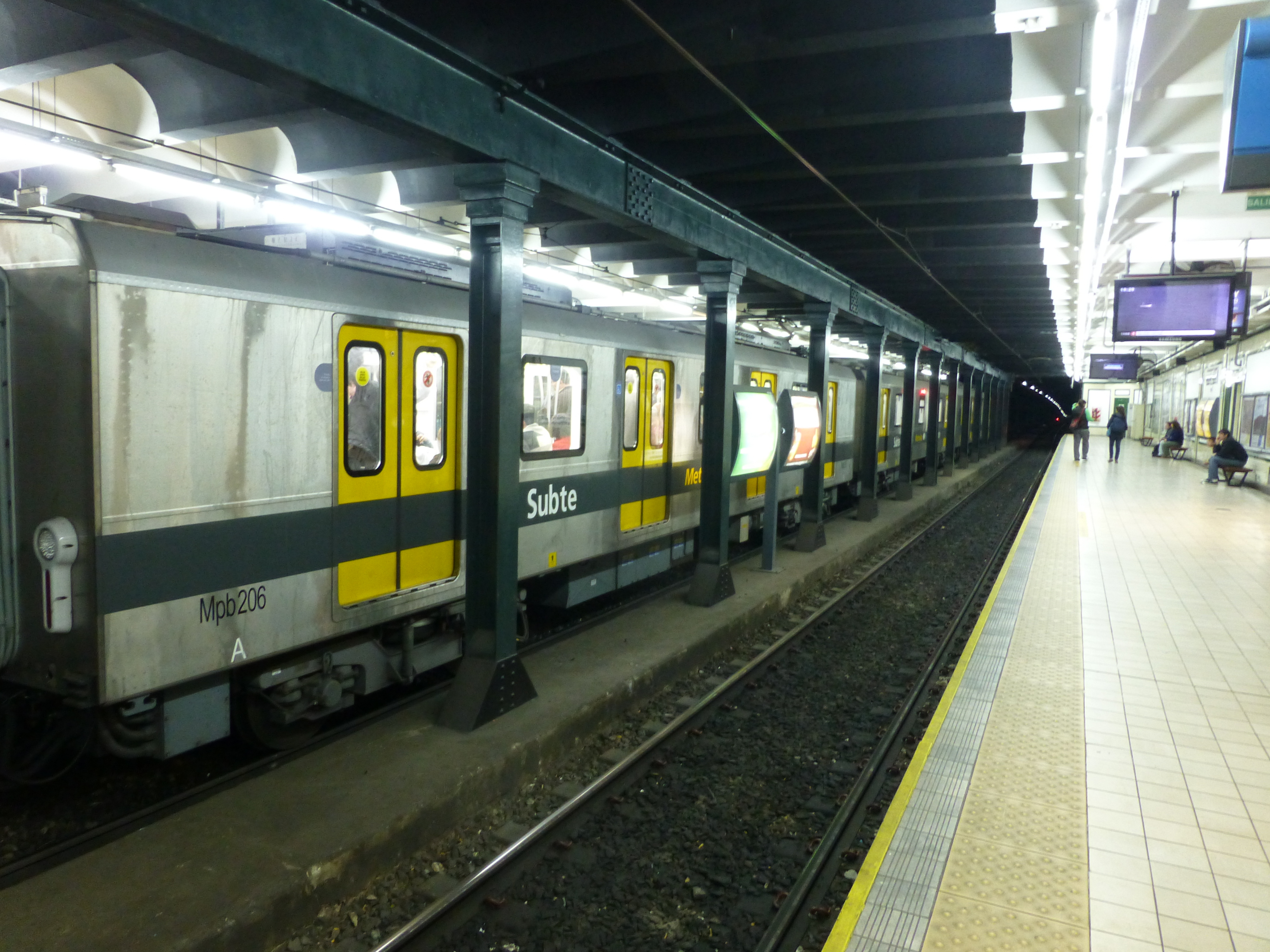

General information
- Location: Avenida Rivadavia and Avenida Castro Barros
- Coordinates: 34°36′42.5″S 58°25′18.3″W
- Platforms: Side platforms

History
- Opened: 1 April 1914
- Former names: Medrano

Services
Preceding station	Buenos Aires Underground	Following station
Río de Janeiro towards San Pedrito	Line A	Loria towards Plaza de Mayo
Location

Castro Barros is a station on Line A of the Buenos Aires Metro. The station was opened on 1 April 1914 as part of the extension of the line from Plaza Miserere to Río de Janeiro.
