= Avenida Pueyrredón =

Avenue in Buenos Aires, Argentina

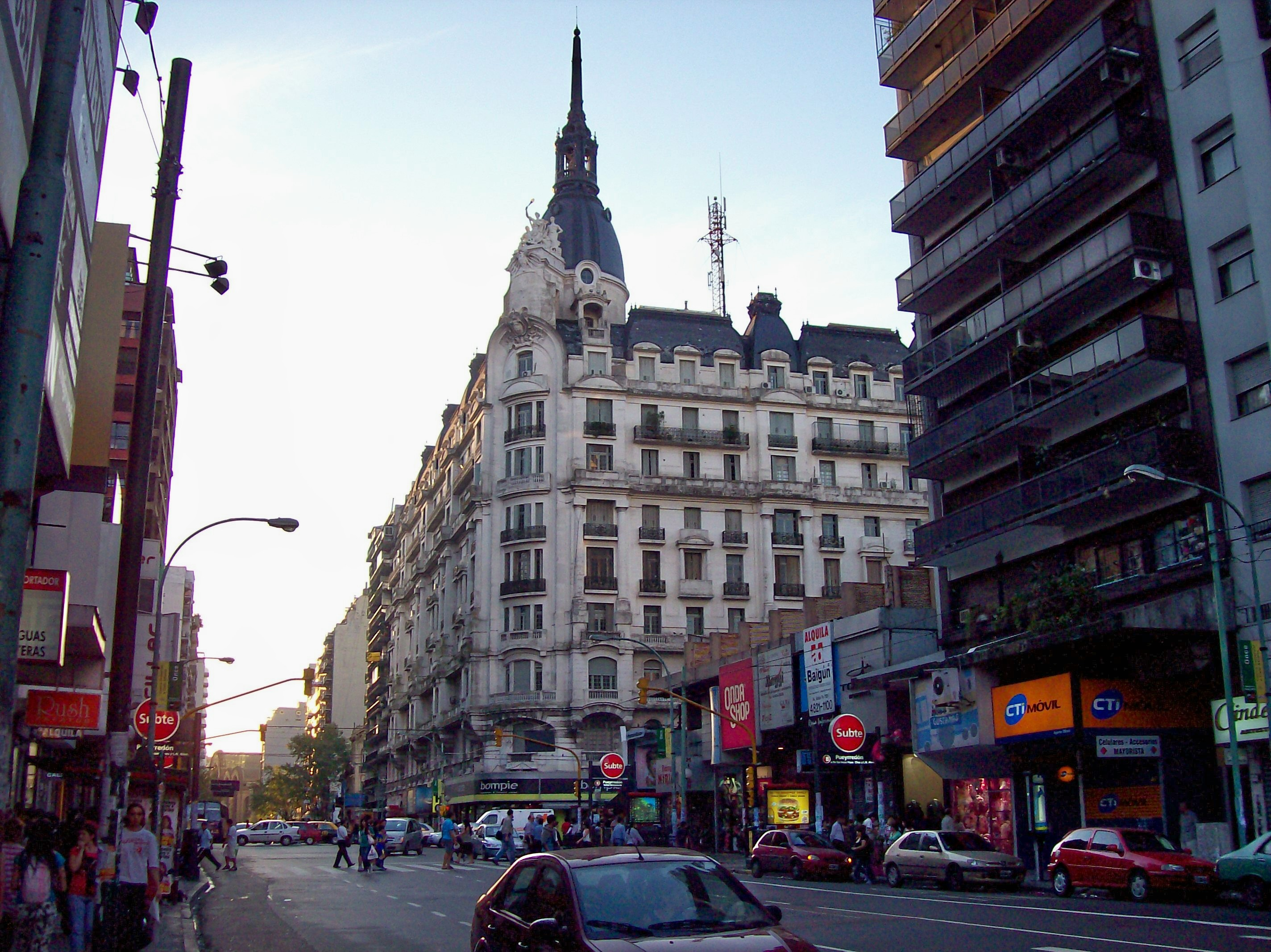
Intersection with Avenida Corrientes.

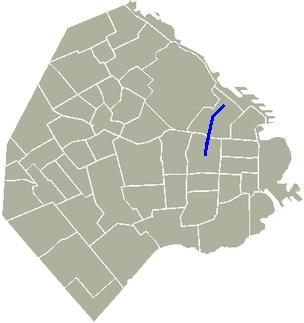
Location of Avenida Pueyrredón in Buenos Aires.

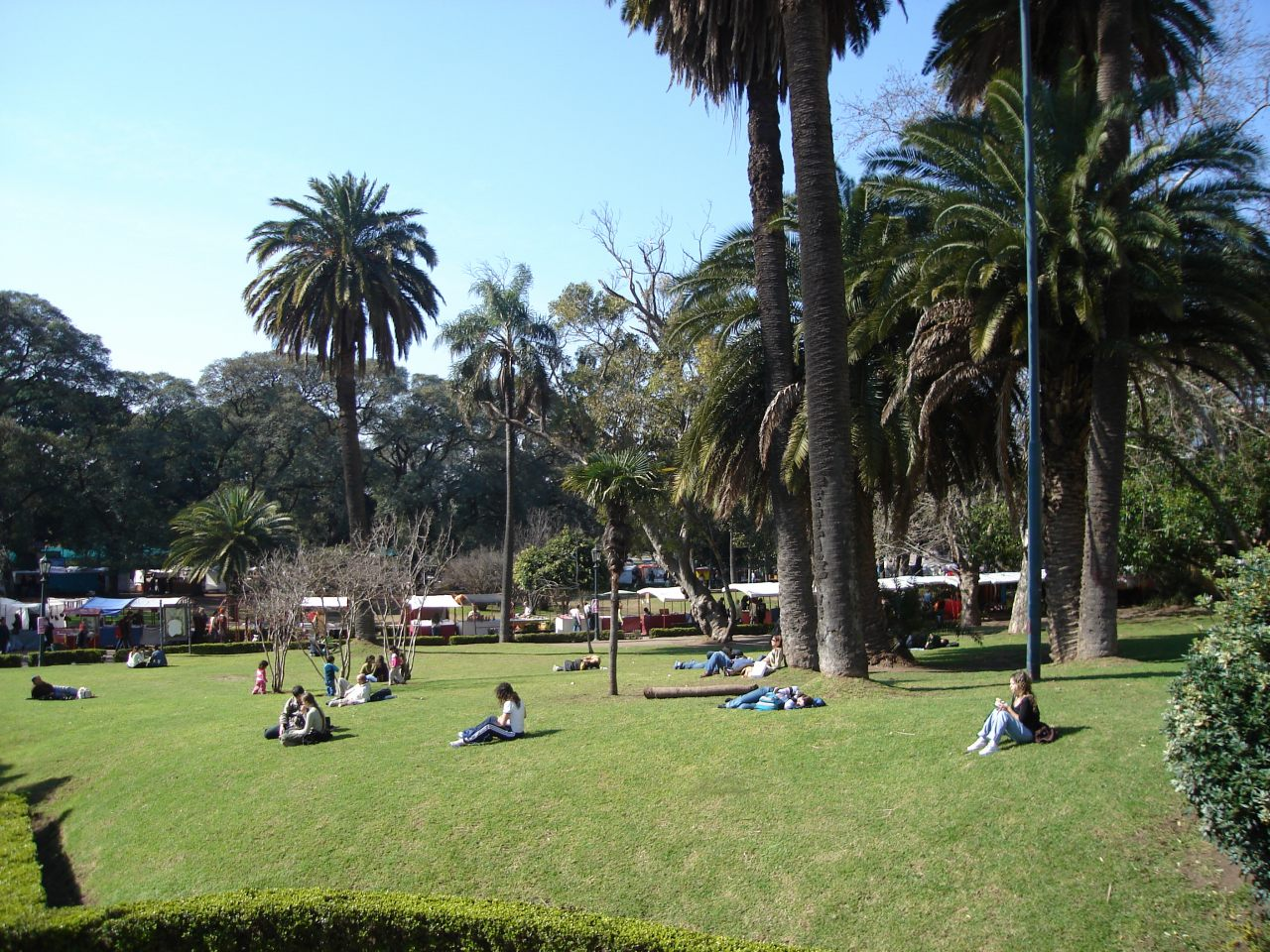
Plaza Intendente Alvear

Avenida Pueyrredón is an avenue that runs through the Recoleta and Balvanera neighborhoods of Buenos Aires, Argentina, and goes from southwest to northeast, parallel to Avenida 9 de Julio. It starts at Avenida Rivadavia, and ends at Avenida Figueroa Alcorta.

The Avenue starts at Avenida Rivadavia intersection front of Plaza Miserere and Once Railway Station.

The Buenos Aires Underground has numerous stations that serve Avenida Pueyrredón; stations Plaza Miserere on Line, Pueyrredón on Line, Pueyrredón on Line and Once, Corrientes, Córdoba, Santa Fe and Las Heras on Line.

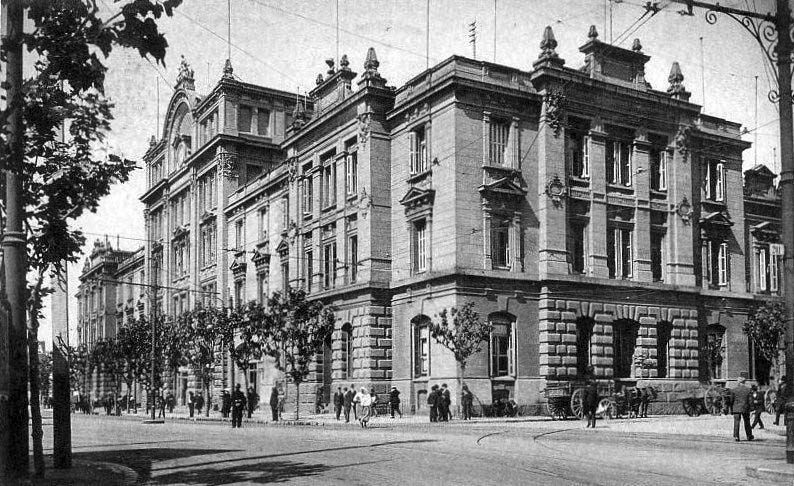
Once railway station.

== Gallery ==
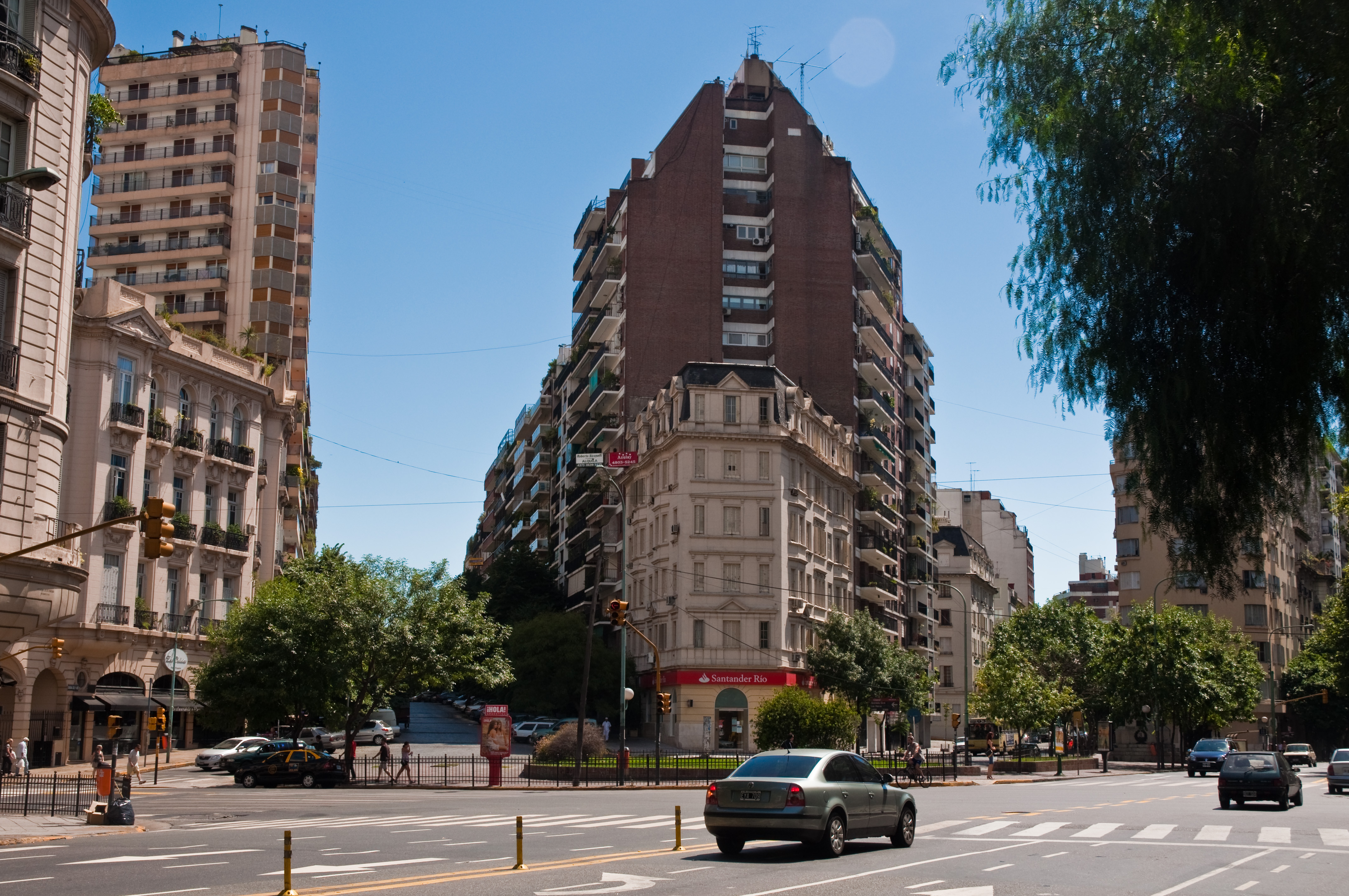
Las Heras intersection with Avenida Pueyrredón.

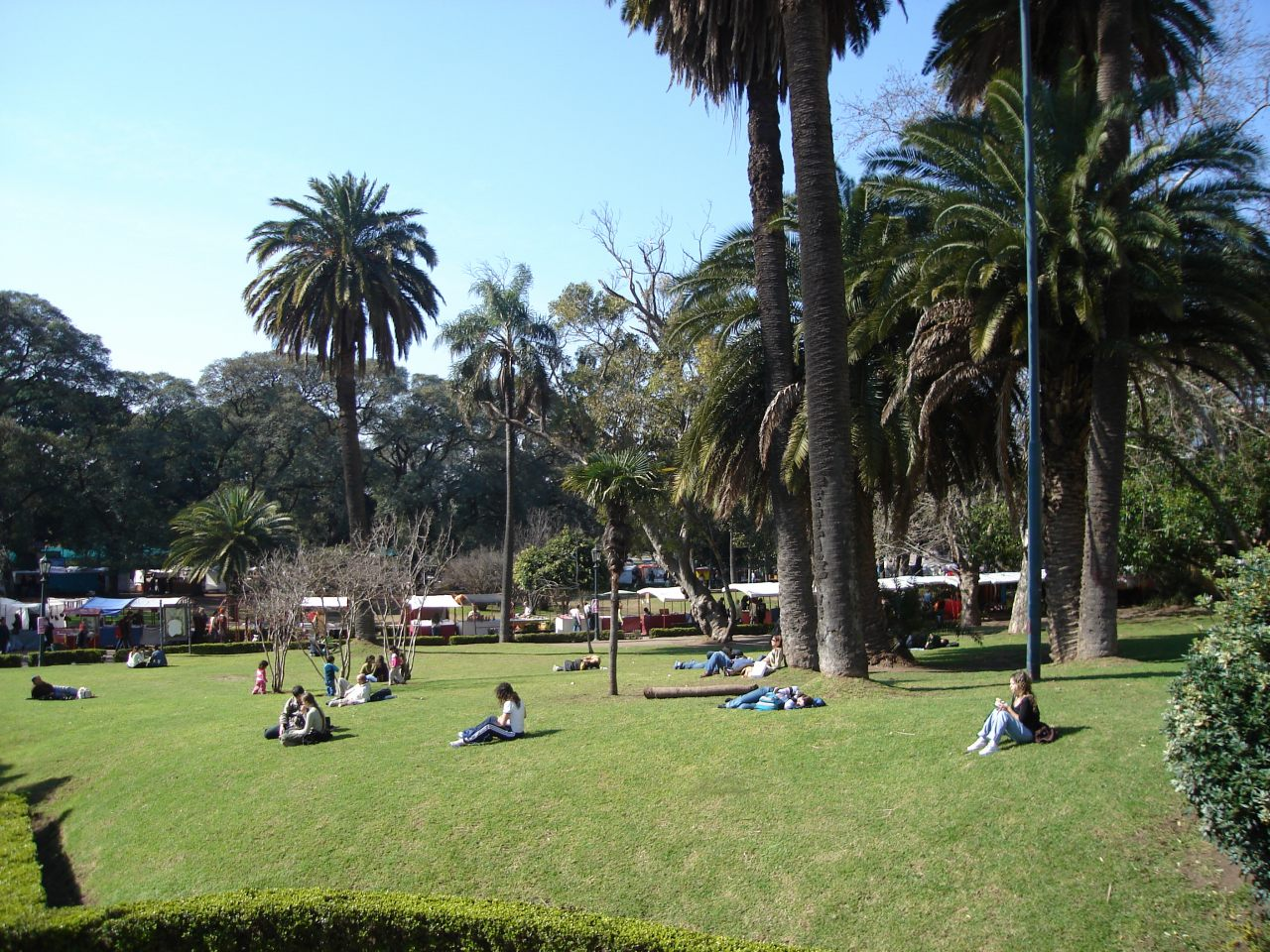
Plaza Francia in the end of Avenida Pueyrredón.
