= Lima and Avenida de Mayo (Buenos Aires Underground) =

Buenos Aires Underground station

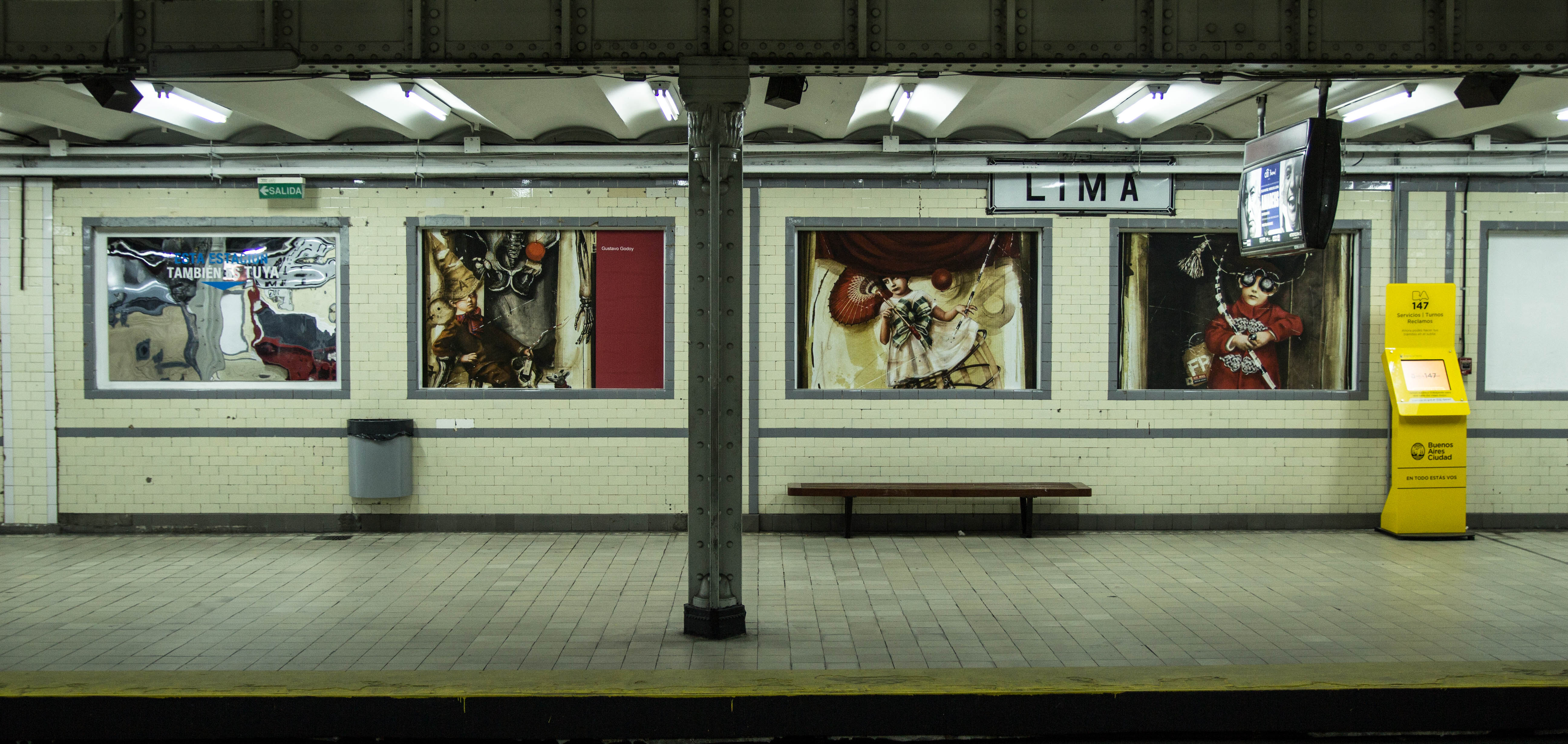

General information
- Location: Avenida de Mayo and Lima
- Coordinates: 34°36′32.8″S 58°22′55.5″W
- Platforms: Side platforms

History
- Opened: 1 December 1913

Services
Preceding station	Buenos Aires Underground	Following station
Sáenz Peña towards San Pedrito	Line A Transfer to: Avenida de Mayo	Piedras towards Plaza de Mayo
Location

Lima is a station on Line A of the Buenos Aires Underground. Passengers may transfer from here to the Avenida de Mayo station on Line C and Metrobus 9 de Julio. The station belonged to the inaugural section of the Buenos Aires Underground opened on 1 December 1913, which linked the stations Plaza Miserere and Plaza de Mayo.

Avenida de Mayo is another station, on Line C. From here, passengers may transfer to Lima on Line A and Metrobus 9 de Julio. The station was opened on 9 November 1934 as part of the inaugural section of the line, from Constitución to Diagonal Norte.

== Gallery ==
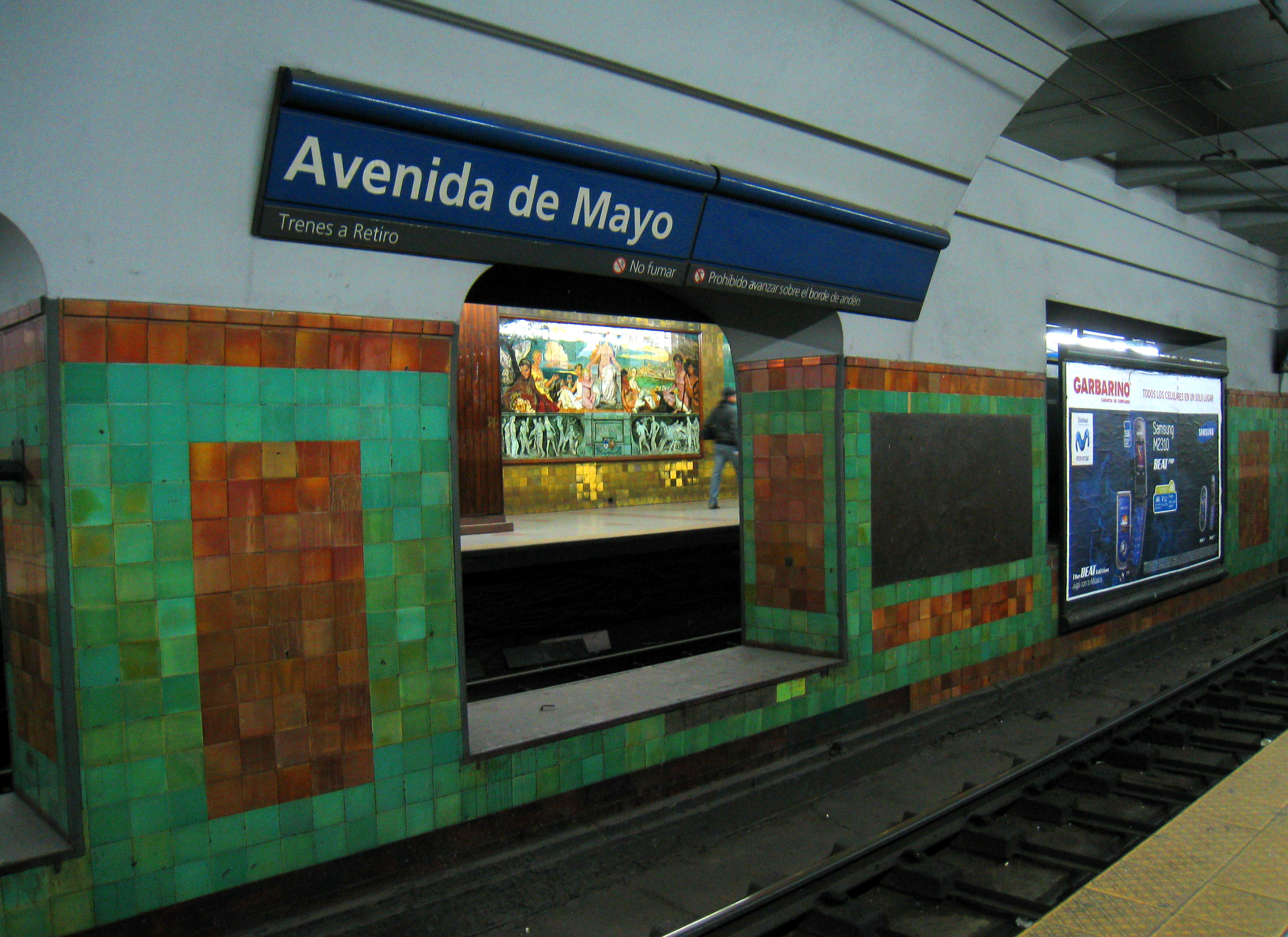

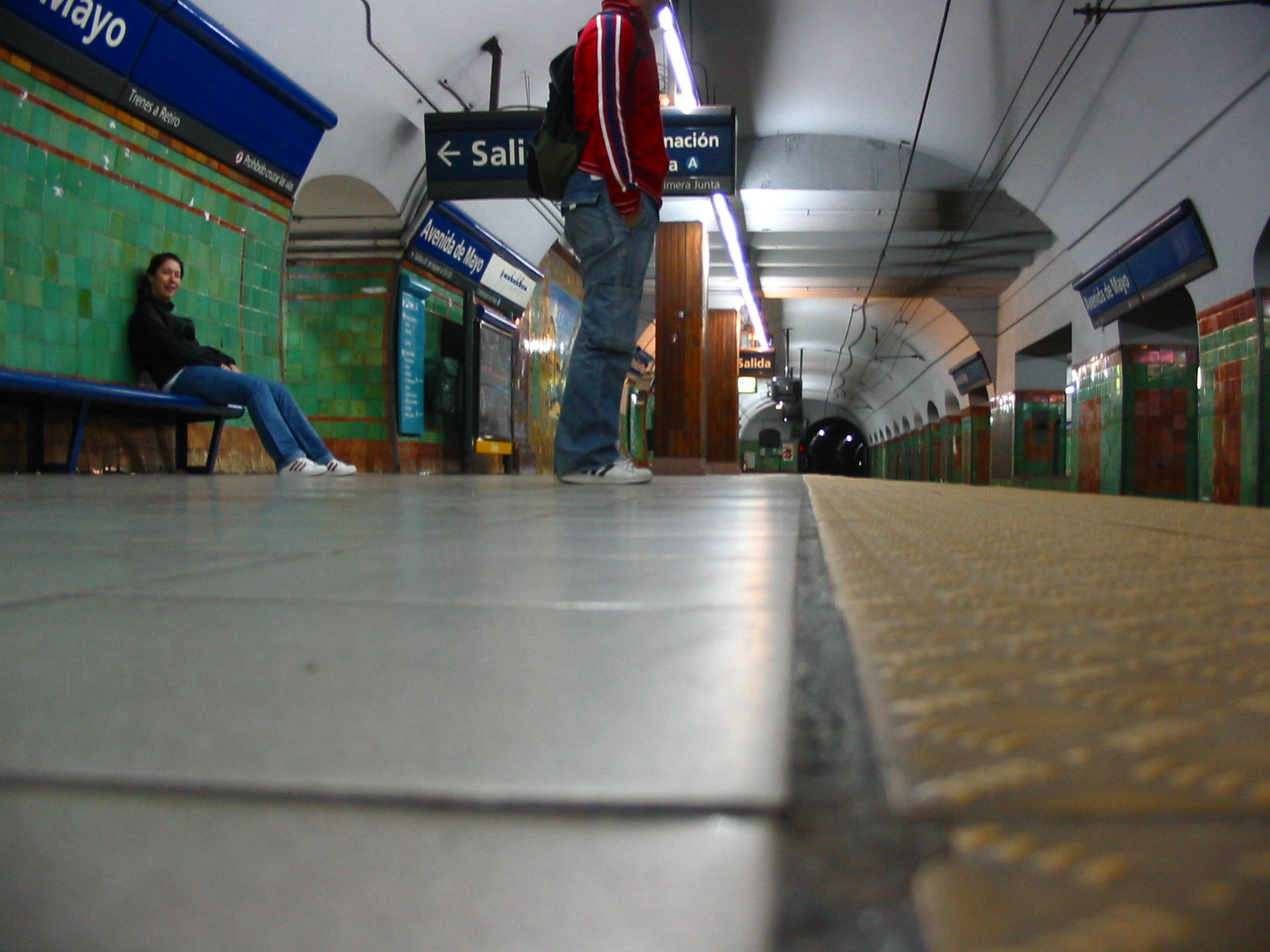

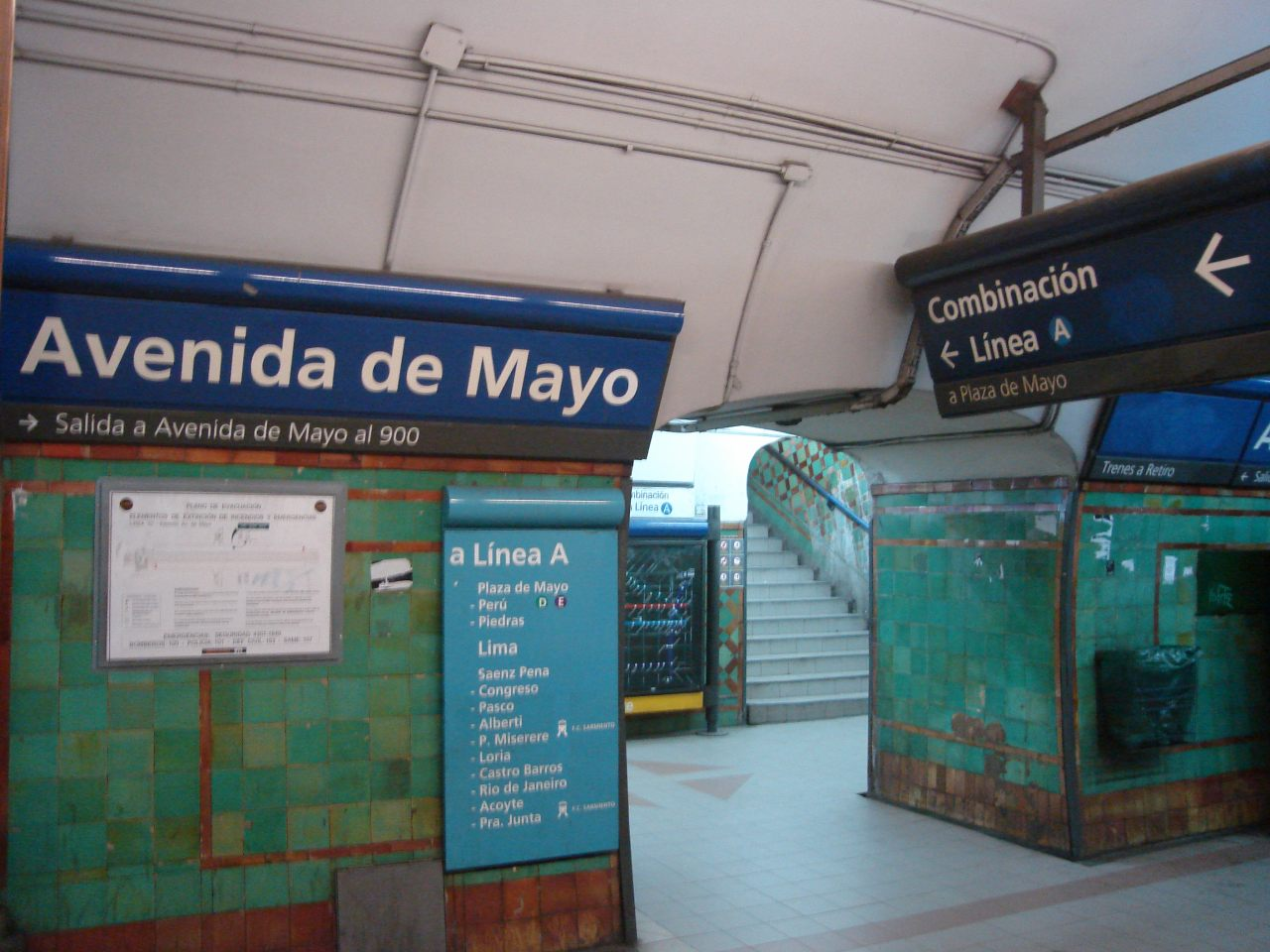
