= Acoyte (Buenos Aires Underground) =

Buenos Aires Underground station

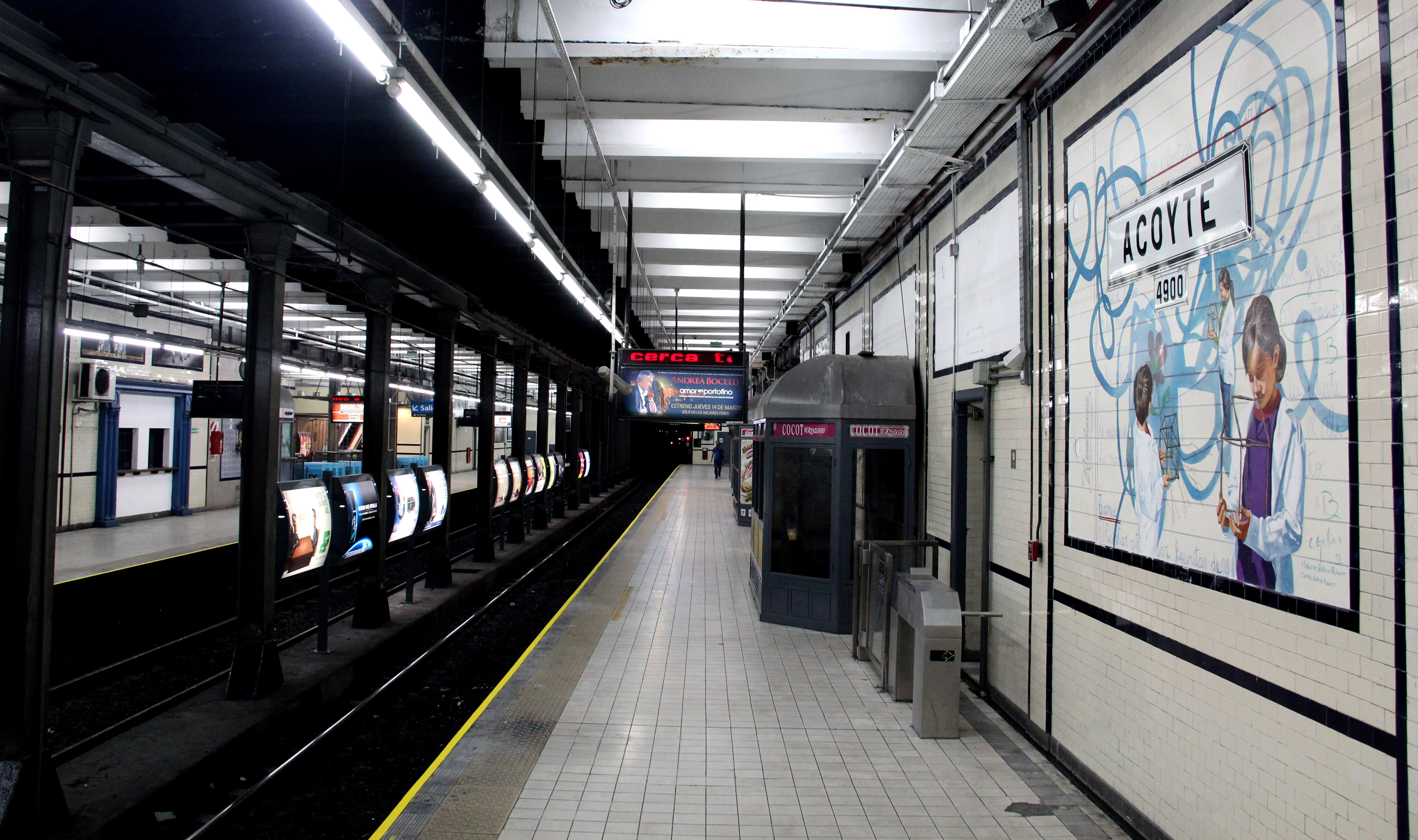

General information
- Location: Avenida Rivadavia and Avenida Acoyte
- Coordinates: 34°37′5.7″S 58°26′10.7″W
- Platforms: Side platforms

History
- Opened: 1 April 1914
- Former names: José María Moreno

Services
Preceding station	Buenos Aires Underground	Following station
Primera Junta towards San Pedrito	Line A	Río de Janeiro towards Plaza de Mayo
Location

Acoyte is a station on Line A of the Buenos Aires Metro. The station was opened on 1 July 1914 as part of the extension of the line from Río de Janeiro to Primera Junta.
