= Río de Janeiro (Buenos Aires Underground) =

Buenos Aires Underground station

Rio de Janeiro
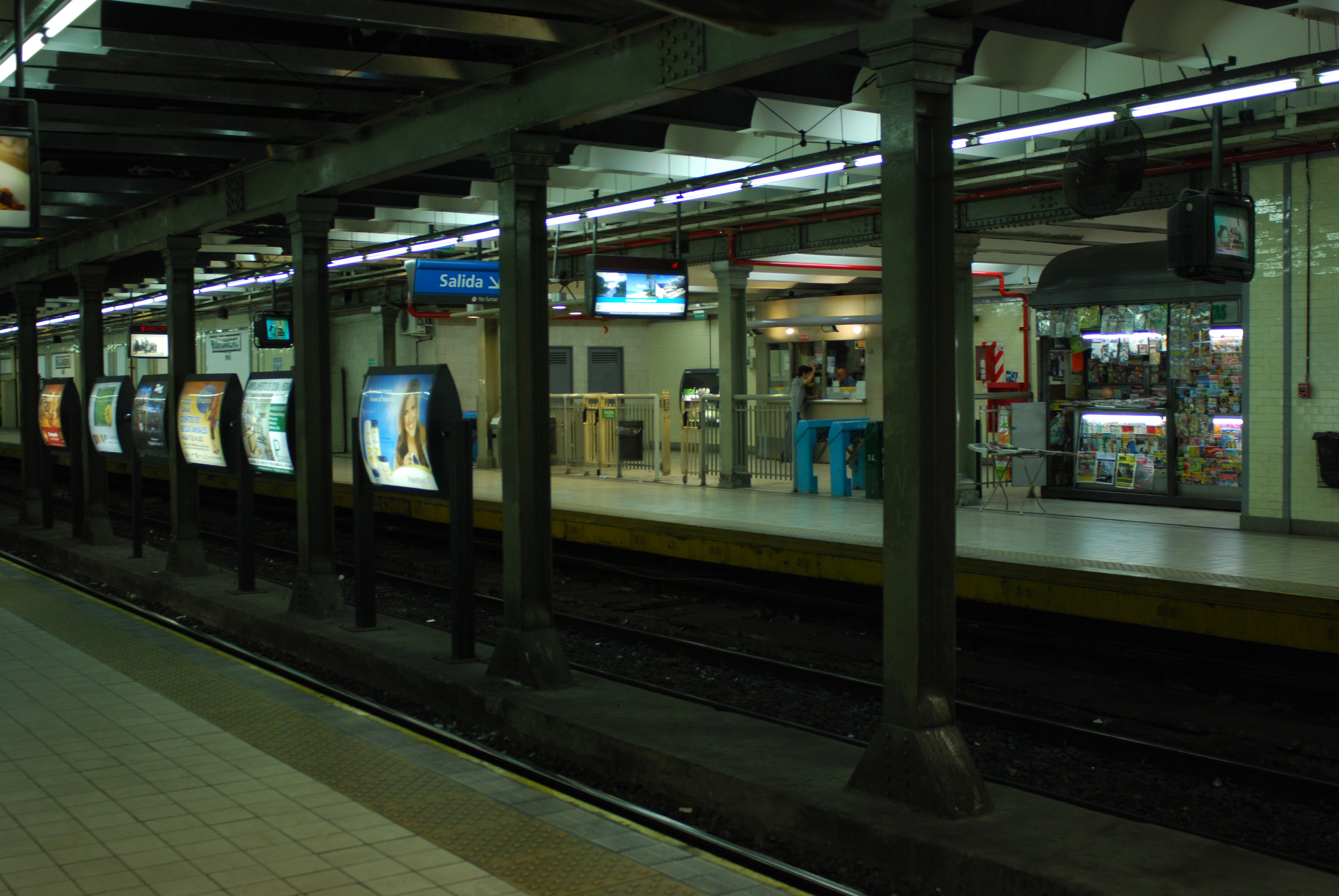

General information
- Location: Avenida Rivadavia and Río de Janeiro
- Coordinates: 34°36′54.8″S 58°25′46″W
- Platforms: Side platforms

History
- Opened: 1 April 1914

Services
Preceding station	Buenos Aires Underground	Following station
Acoyte towards San Pedrito	Line A	Castro Barros towards Plaza de Mayo
Location

Rio de Janeiro is a station on Line A of the Buenos Aires Underground. The station was opened on 1 April 1914 as the western terminus of the extension of the line from Plaza Miserere. On 1 July 1914 the line was extended to the west Primera Junta.
