= Pichincha (Buenos Aires Underground) =

Buenos Aires Underground station

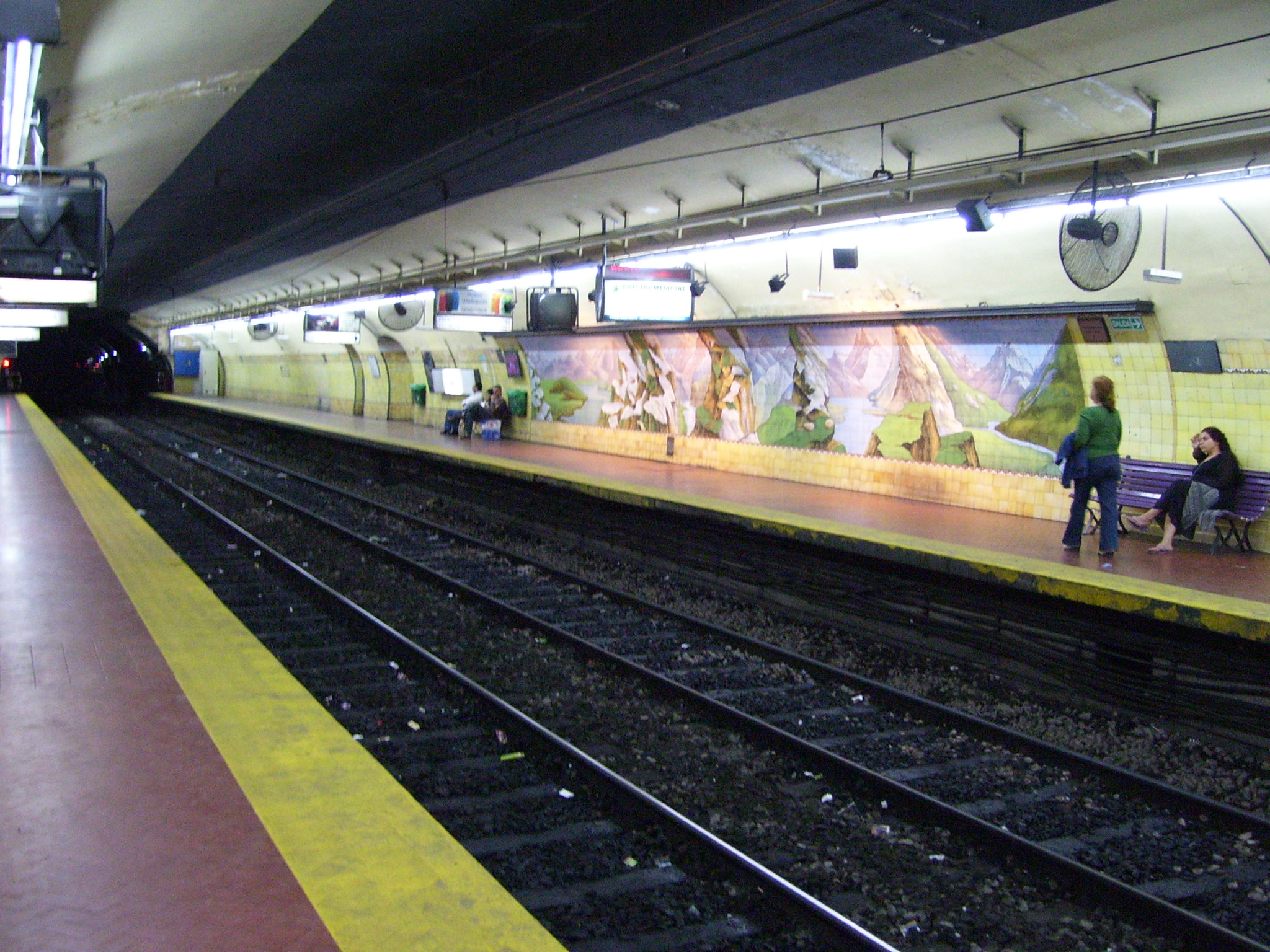

General information
- Location: San Juan 2200
- Coordinates: 34°37′23.3″S 58°23′49.7″W
- Platforms: Side platforms

History
- Opened: 20 June 1944

Services
| Preceding station | Buenos Aires Underground | Following station |
|---|---|---|
| Jujuy towards Plaza de los Virreyes | Line E | Entre Ríos - Rodolfo Walsh towards Retiro |
Location

Pichincha is a station on Line E of the Buenos Aires Underground. The station was opened on 20 June 1944 as part of the inaugural section of the line from San José to General Urquiza.
