= Venezuela (Buenos Aires Underground) =

Metro station in Buenos Aires

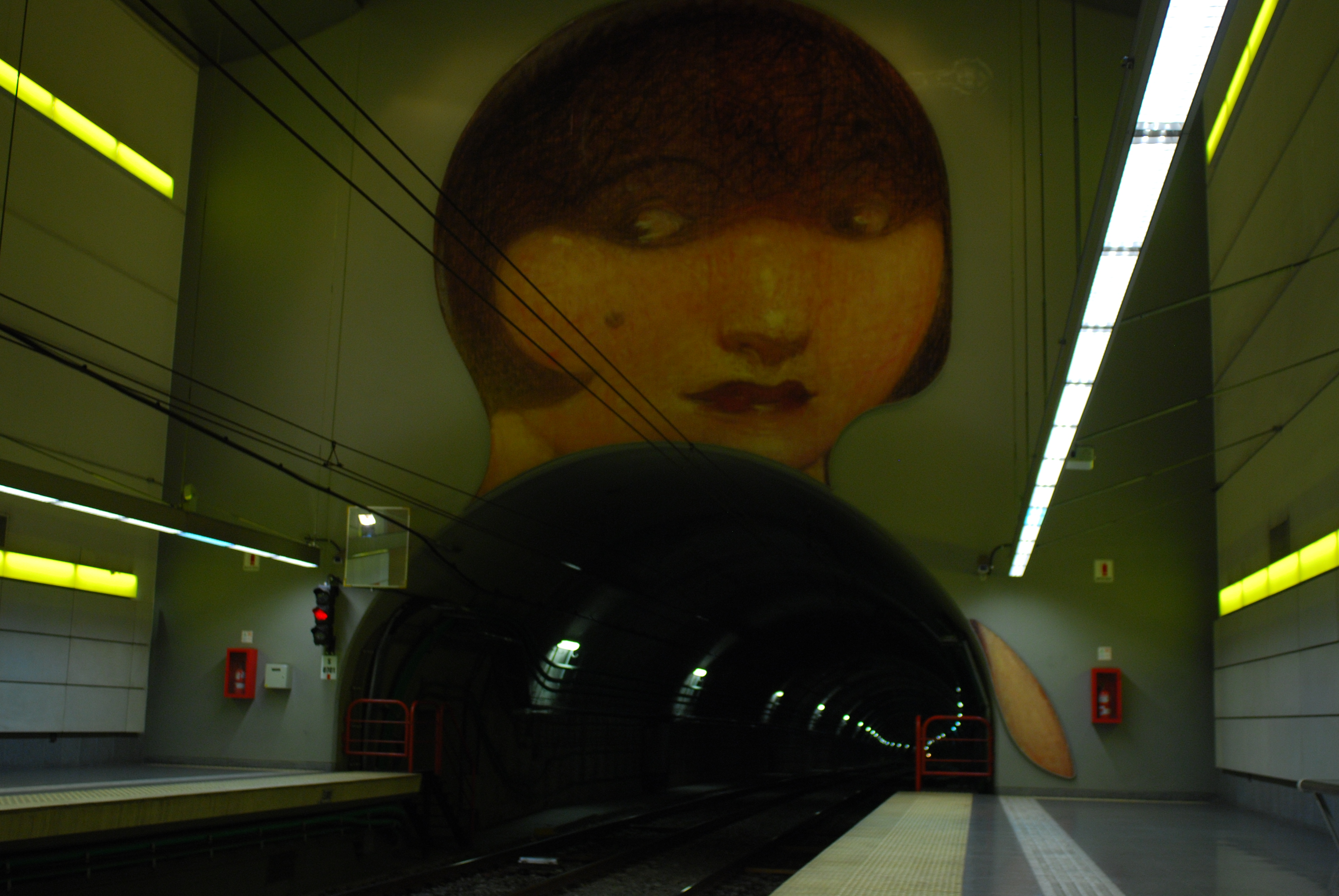

General information
- Location: Jujuy and Venezuela
- Coordinates: 34°36′54.9″S 58°24′17″W
- Platforms: Side platforms

History
- Opened: 18 October 2007

Services
Preceding station	Buenos Aires Underground	Following station
Once towards Facultad de Derecho	Line H	Humberto I towards Hospitales
Location

Venezuela Station is a station on Line H of the Buenos Aires Underground. The station was opened on 18 October 2007, as part of the inaugural section of the line, between Once - 30 de Diciembre and Caseros.
