= Entre Ríos - Rodolfo Walsh (Buenos Aires Underground) =

Buenos Aires Underground station

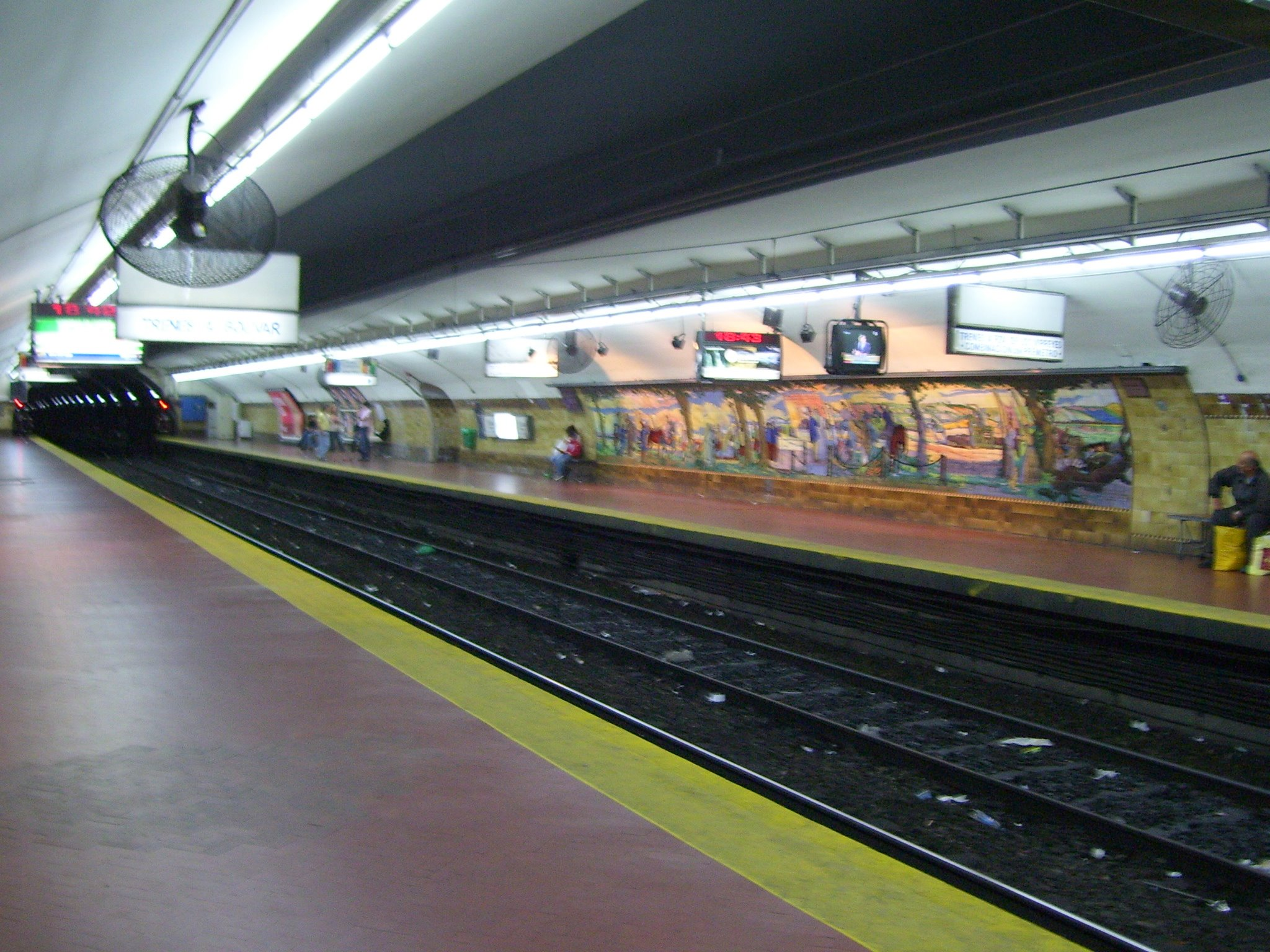

General information
- Location: Entre Ríos 1100
- Coordinates: 34°37′21.8″S 58°23′29.3″W
- Platforms: Side platforms

History
- Opened: 20 June 1944

Services
Preceding station	Buenos Aires Underground	Following station
Pichincha towards Plaza de los Virreyes	Line E	San José towards Retiro
Location

Entre Ríos - Rodolfo Walsh is a station on Line E of the Buenos Aires Underground. The station was opened on 20 June 1944 as part of the inaugural section of the line from San José to General Urquiza.

The station is jointly named for Entre Ríos Avenue and journalist Rodolfo Walsh, who was murdered and disappeared by the military dictatorship in Argentina in 1977.
