= Jujuy (Buenos Aires Underground) =

Buenos Aires Underground station

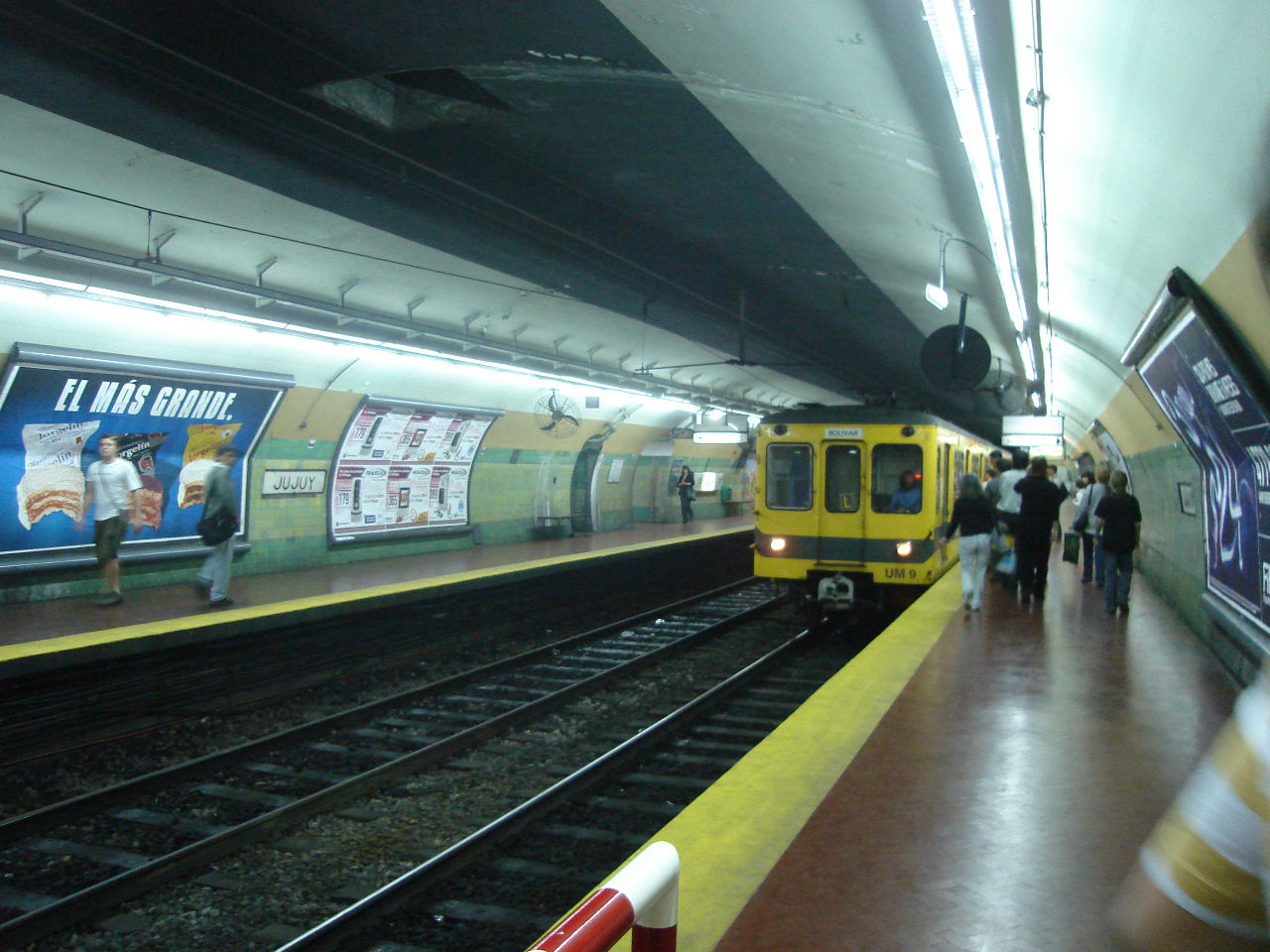

General information
- Location: San Juan 2700
- Coordinates: 34°37′25.8″S 58°24′10.4″W
- Platforms: Side platforms

History
- Opened: June 20, 1944

Services
Preceding station	Buenos Aires Underground	Following station
General Urquiza towards Plaza de los Virreyes	Line E	Pichincha towards Retiro
Venezuela towards Facultad de Derecho	Line H transfer at Humberto I	Inclán towards Hospitales
Location

Jujuy is a station on Line E of the Buenos Aires Underground. From here, passengers may transfer to Humberto I station on Line H. The station was opened on 20 June 1944 as part of the inaugural section of the line from San José to General Urquiza.

== Humberto I ==
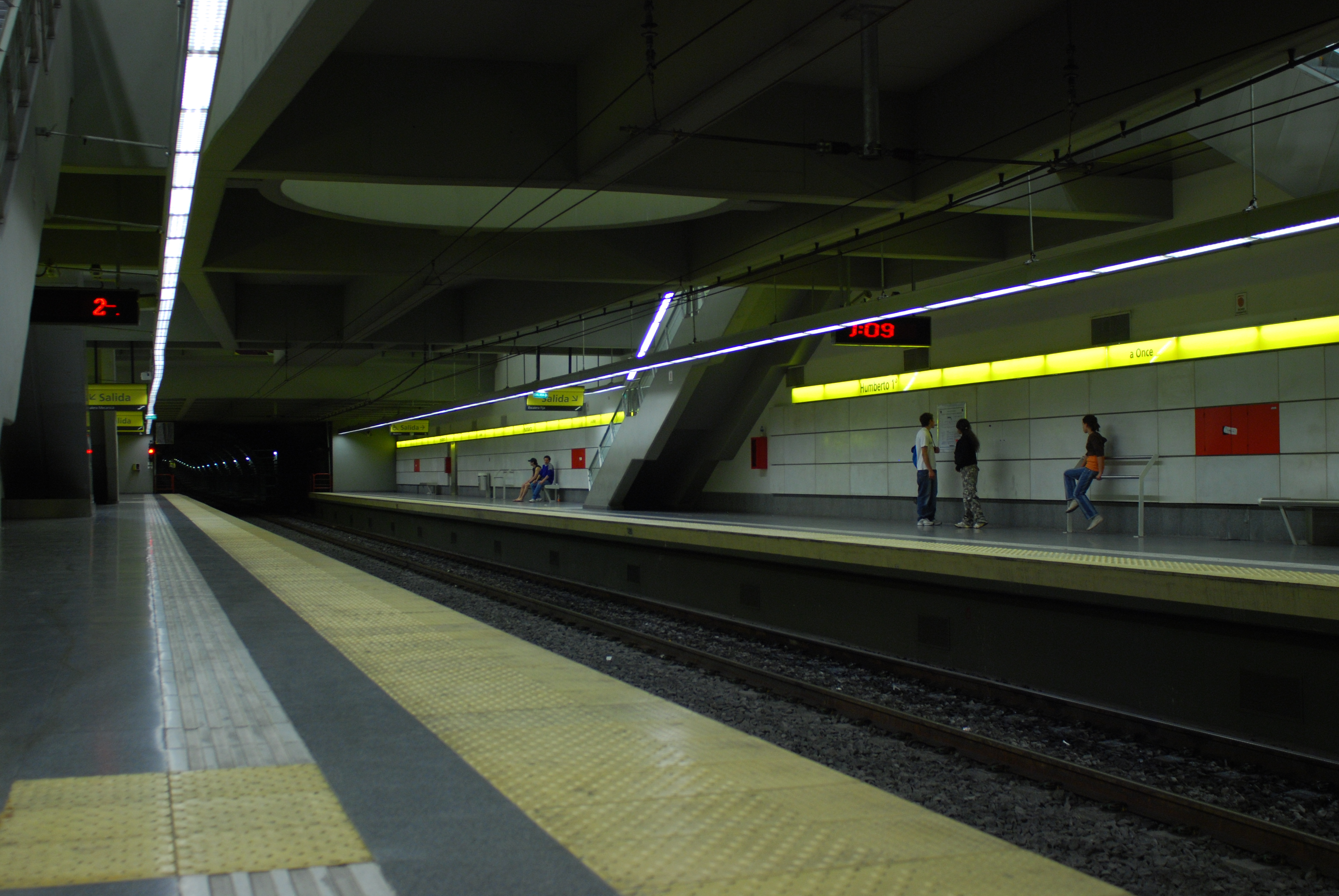
Humberto I station, Line H

Humberto I Station is a station on Line H of the Buenos Aires Underground. From here, passengers may transfer to Jujuy station. The station was opened on 18 October 2007, as part of the inaugural section of the line, between Once - 30 de Diciembre and Caseros.
