= Pueyrredón and Corrientes stations (Buenos Aires Underground) =

Buenos Aires Underground station

Pueyrredón and Corrientes are adjacent metro stations in the Buenos Aires Underground. They are an important connection between the system's B Line and H Line.

== Pueyrredón station ==
Pueyrredón
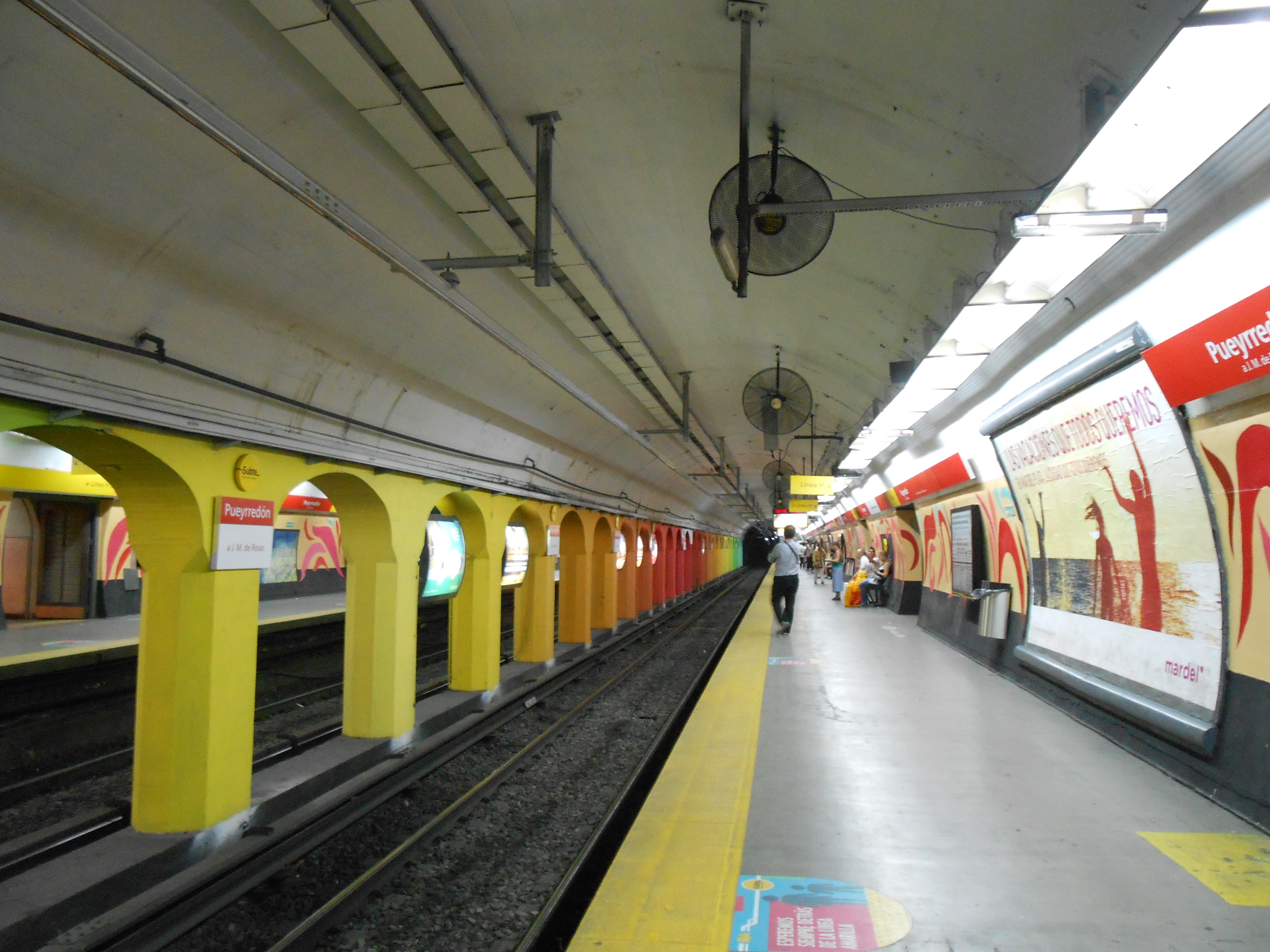

General information
- Location: Corrientes and Pueyrredón
- Coordinates: 34.6041°S 58.4053°W
- Platforms: Side platforms
- Connections: Corrientes

History
- Opened: 17 October 1930

Services
| Preceding station | Buenos Aires Underground | Following station |
|---|---|---|
| Carlos Gardel towards Juan Manuel de Rosas | Line B | Pasteur - AMIA towards Leandro N. Alem |
Location

Pueyrredón is a station on Line B of the Buenos Aires Underground. Passengers may transfer from here to the Corrientes Station on Line H. The station was opened on 17 October 1930 as part of the inaugural section of the line between Federico Lacroze and Callao.

It is located in the Balvanera barrio, at the intersection of Avenida Corrientes and Avenida Pueyrredón, and named after the latter.

== Corrientes station ==
Corrientes
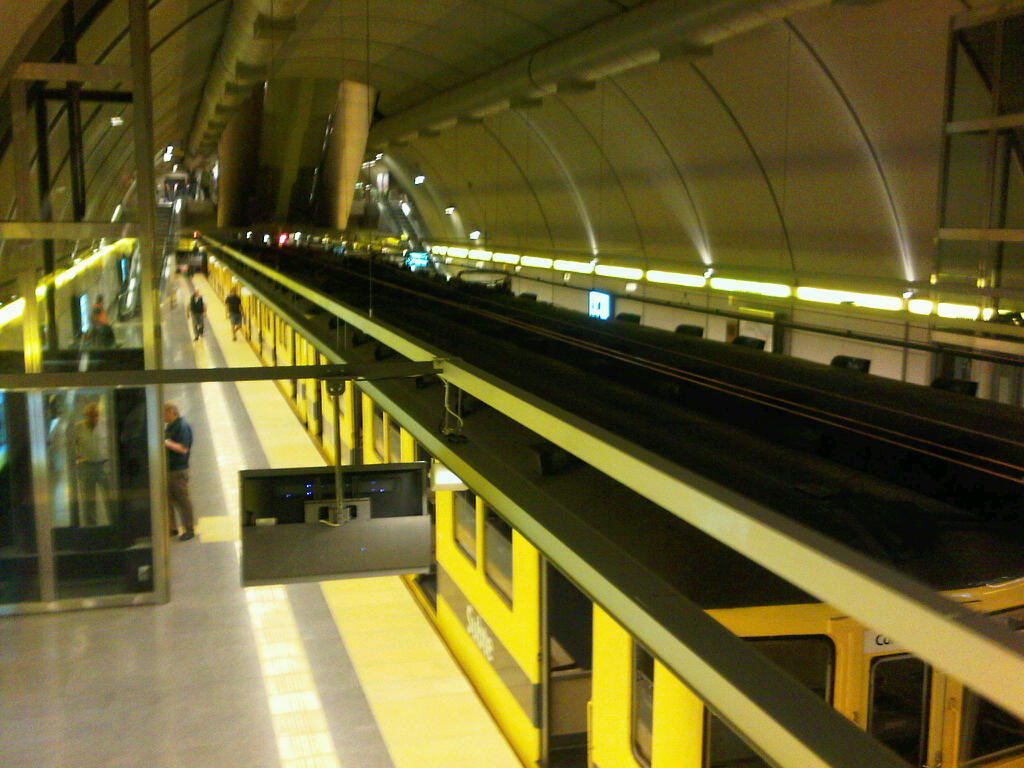

General information
- Location: Pueyrredón and Corrientes
- Coordinates: 34.6046°S 58.4054°W
- Platforms: Side platforms
- Connections: Pueyrredón

History
- Opened: 6 December 2010

Services
| Preceding station | Buenos Aires Underground | Following station |
|---|---|---|
| Córdoba towards Facultad de Derecho | Line H | Once towards Hospitales |
Location

Corrientes Station is a station on Line H of the Buenos Aires Underground. The station was opened on 6 December 2010 as part of the one-station extension of the line from Once. It served as the line's north terminus until the extension of the line to Las Heras was completed on 18 December 2015. From here, passengers may transfer to the Pueyrredón Station on Line B.
