= Plaza Miserere (Buenos Aires Underground) =

Buenos Aires Underground station

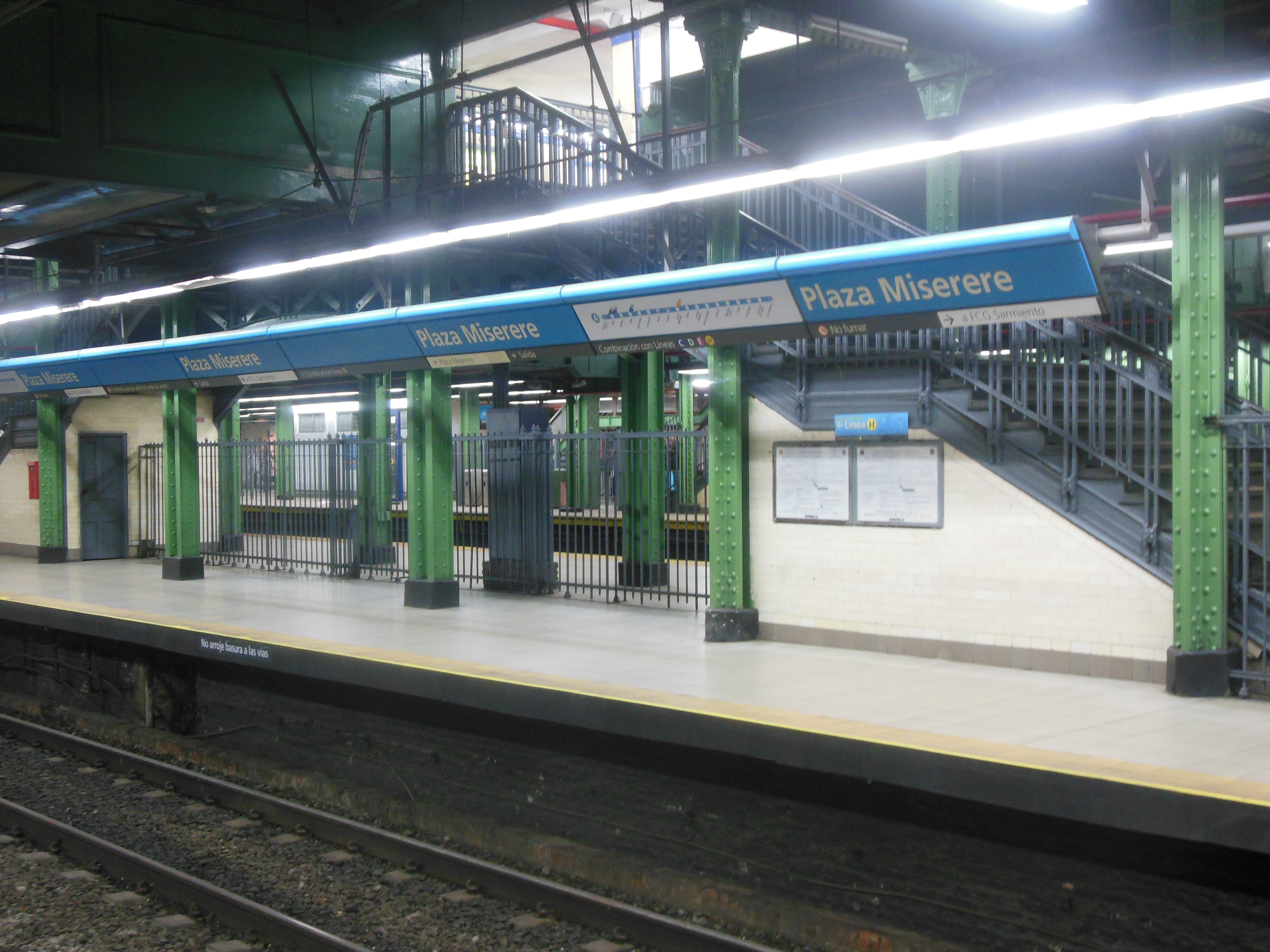

General information
- Location: Avenida Rivadavia y Avenida Pueyrredón
- Coordinates: 34°36′35.7″S 58°24′26.2″W
- Platforms: Side platforms and Island platforms
- Connections: Domingo Faustino Sarmiento Railway and Sarmiento Line

History
- Opened: 1 December 1913
- Former names: Plaza Once

Services
Preceding station	Buenos Aires Underground	Following station
Loria towards San Pedrito	Line A	Alberti towards Plaza de Mayo
Corrientes towards Facultad de Derecho	Line H transfer at Once	Venezuela towards Hospitales
Location

Plaza Miserere (officially Plaza de Miserere) is a station on Line A of the Buenos Aires Underground. The station is located between Alberti and Loria / Pasco stations on the A line underground. Plaza Miserere has interchange with Once underground station of the H line and connection to the Sarmiento line commuter rail service within Once railway station, the central station of the Domingo Faustino Sarmiento Railway.

== Overview ==
It is located at the intersection of Rivadavia and Pueyrredón avenues, under the popular Plaza Miserere, in the neighborhood of Balvanera. The station zone is a shopping precinct and in its vicinity are the French Hospital and the Once railway station of the Sarmiento Railway. This station belonged to the first section of Line A opened on 1 December 1913, linking this station and the Plaza de Mayo station. On 1 April 1914 the line was extended to Río de Janeiro.

In 1997 the station was declared a national historic monument.

== Once ==
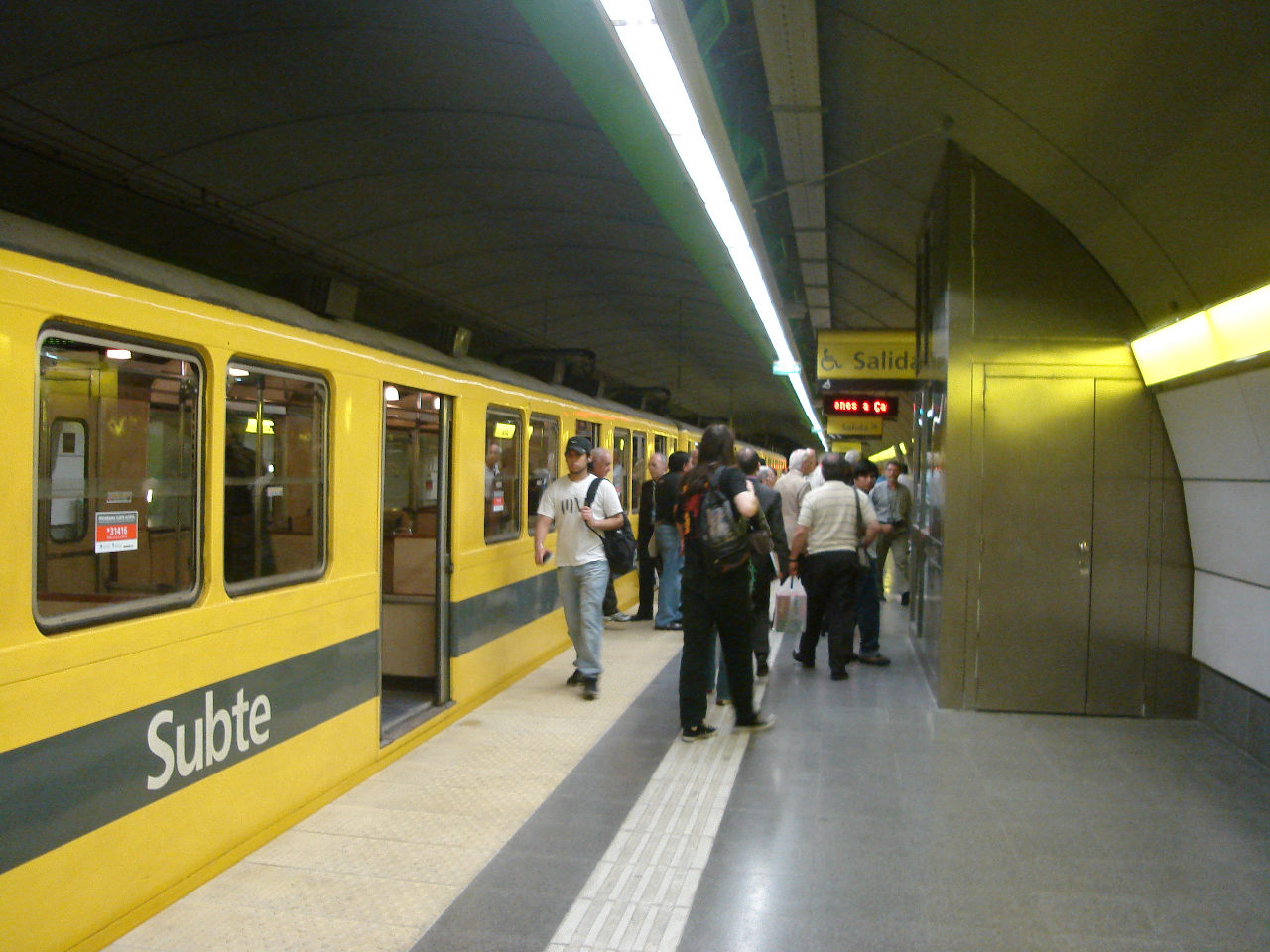
Once - 30 de Diciembre

Once - 30 de Diciembre is a station on Line H of the Buenos Aires Underground and is located at the intersection of Pueyrredón and Rivadavia avenues in the neighbourhood of Balvanera. From here, passengers may transfer to the Plaza Miserere station on line A and, through it, transfer to the Once railway station, the central terminal of the Domingo Faustino Sarmiento Railway and Sarmiento Line.

The station was inaugurated on two occasions. The civil engineering was inaugurated 31 May 2007, but the opening for passenger service was held on 18 October 2007. The station was opened as the northern terminus of the inaugural section of the line, with Humberto I, Venezuela, Caseros and Inclán stations. On 6 December 2010 the line was extended to Corrientes. The Studio of Architects Berdichevsky-Cherny participated in the design of the station.

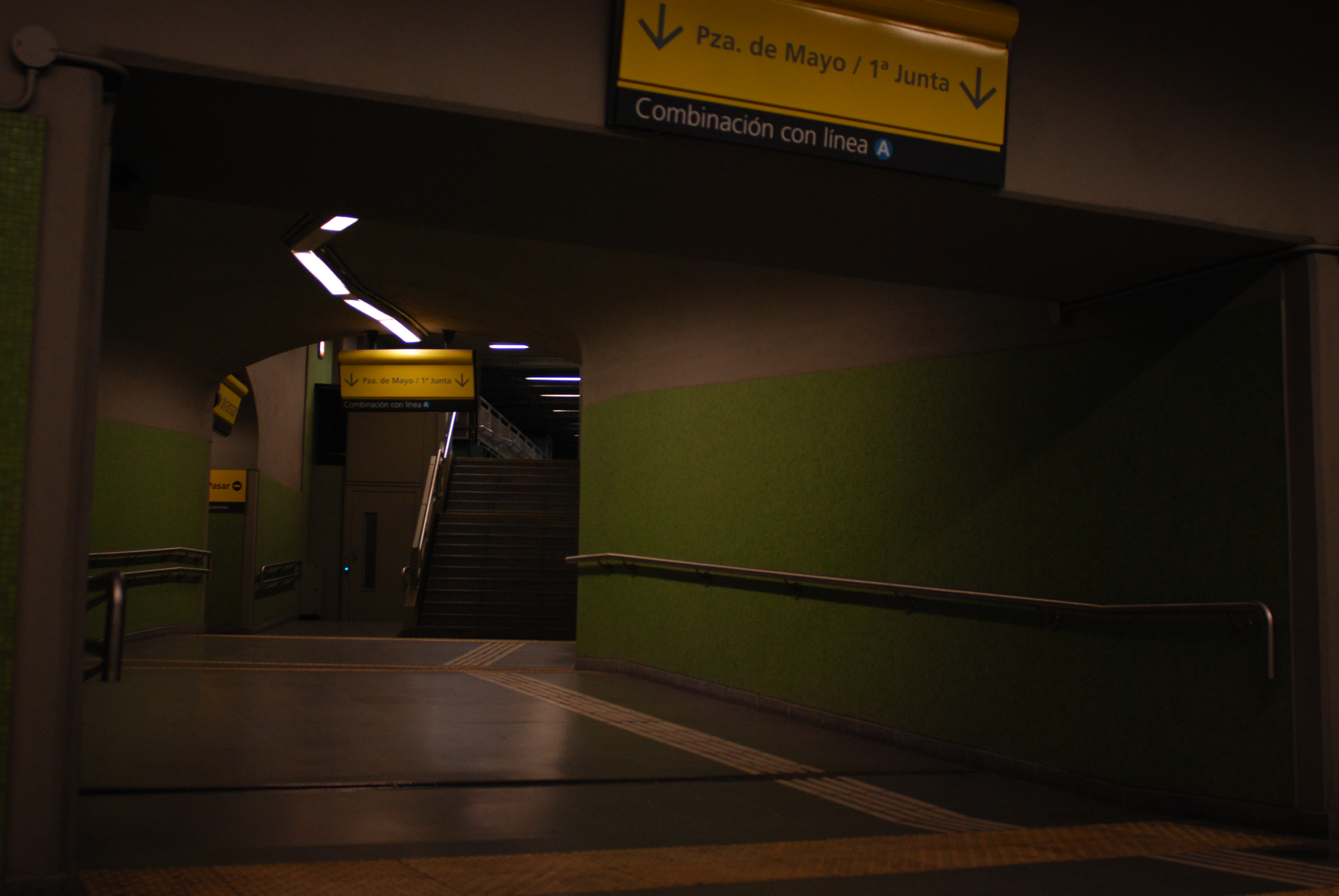

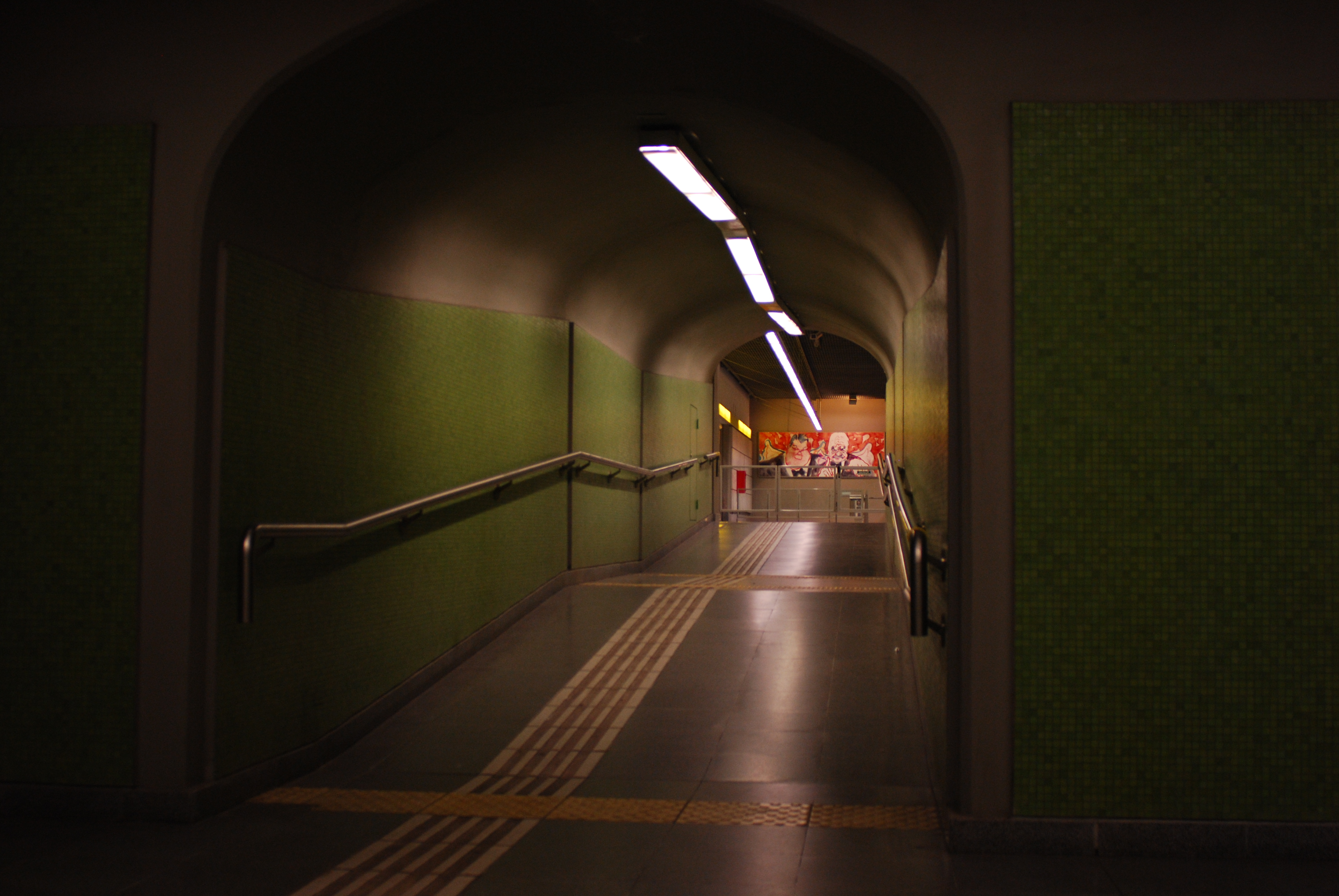

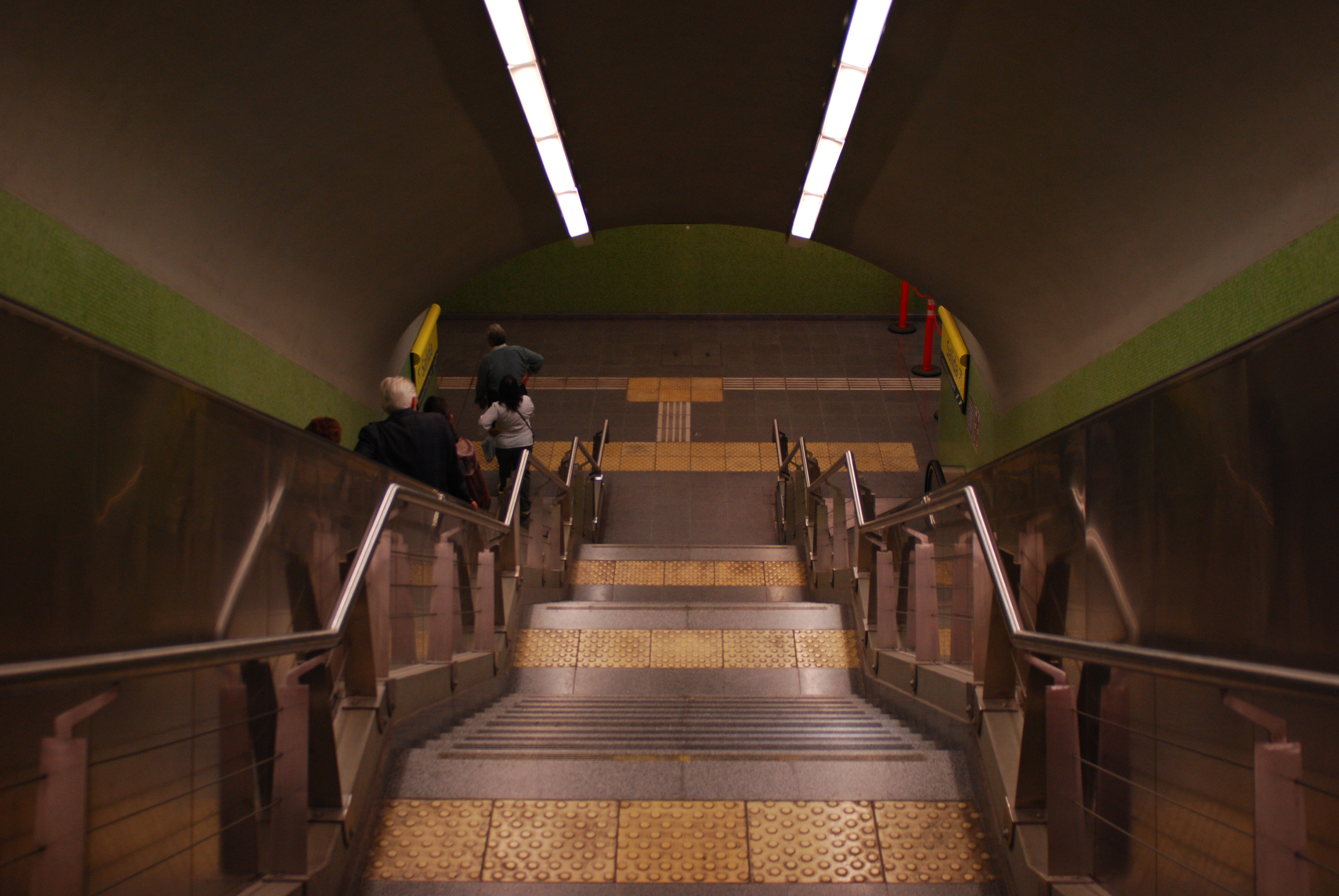

== History ==
When the Anglo-Argentine Tramways Company (Compañía de Tranvías Anglo-Argentina, in Spanish) inaugurated on 1 December 1913 its Line 1 (Today, Line A of the subway), Plaza Once—today Miserere—was the terminus, and thanks to an agreement with the company's Buenos Aires Western Railway (Ferrocarril Oeste de Buenos Aires, in Spanish)—Sarmiento today—it was possible the design and construction of the subway station with the possibility of being used in a synchronized manner for both modes of transport. To do this, it was built with 6 tracks (4 for the subway and 2 for the train) and 4 platforms (2 lateral and two central).

== Nearby ==
- Palacio de Aguas Corrientes
- Abasto de Buenos Aires
