= Avenida Rivadavia =

Street in Buenos Aires, Argentina

Coordinates: 34.60940°S 58.39556°W

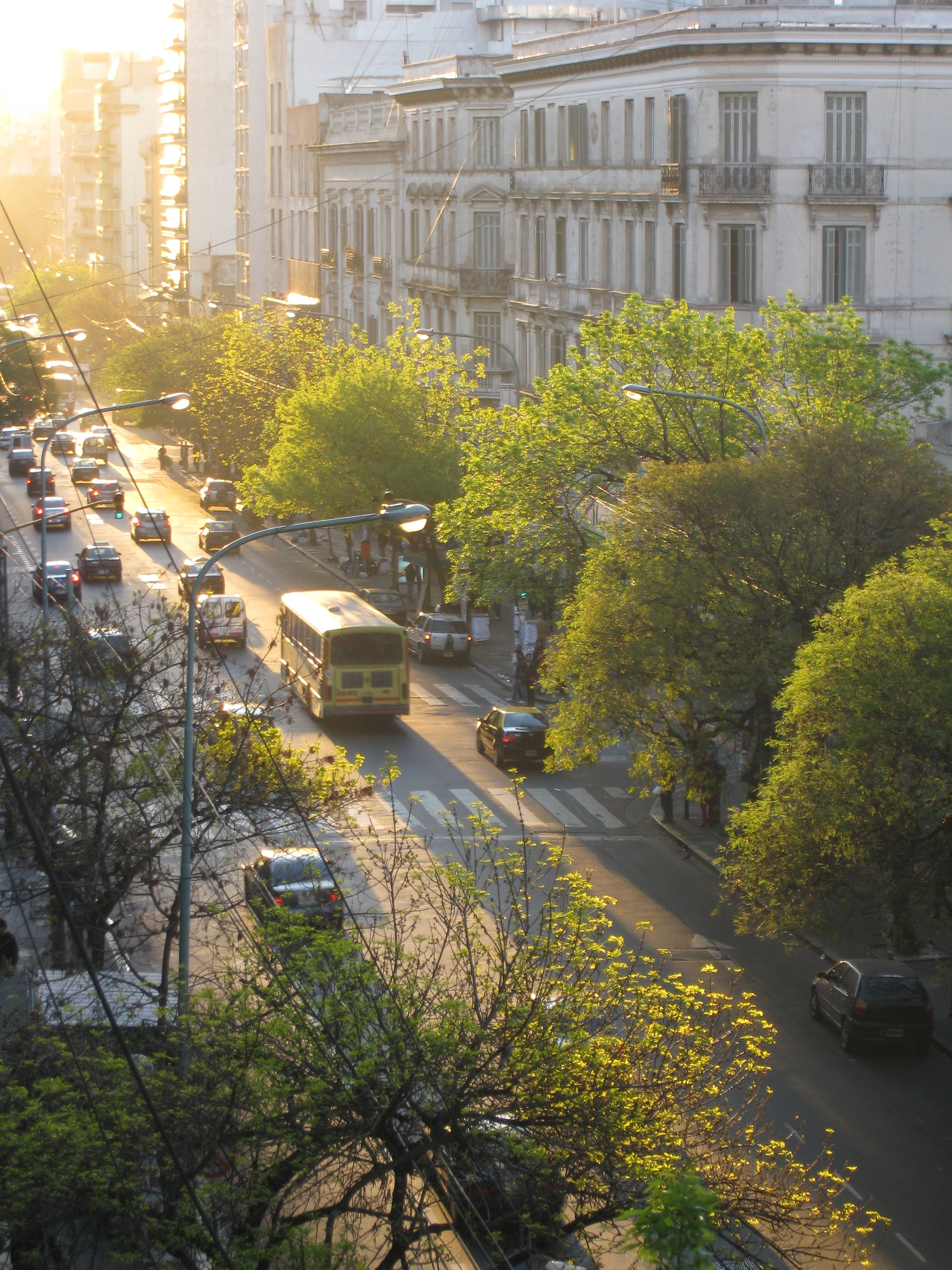
Rivadavia Avenue.

Avenida Rivadavia is one of the principal thoroughfares in Buenos Aires, Argentina, extending 23 miles (37 km) from downtown Buenos Aires to the western suburb of Merlo. It is considered the third longest avenue in the world after Yonge Street (Toronto) and Western Avenue (Chicago).

== History ==
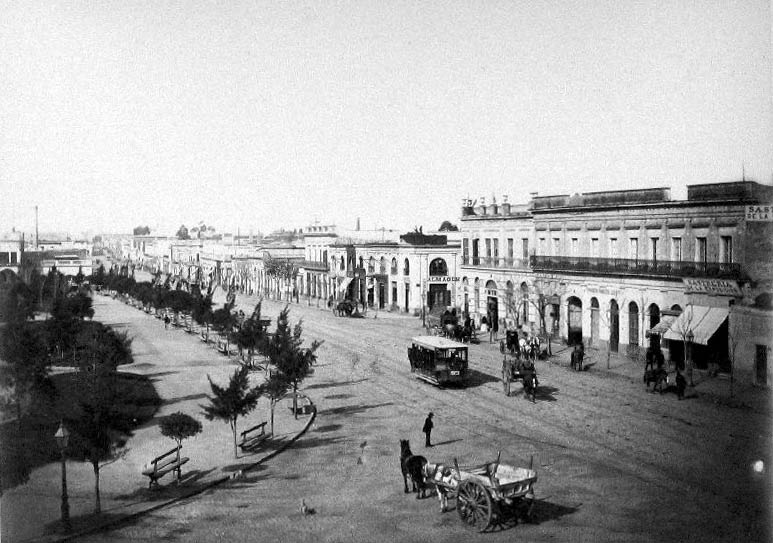
Rivadavia Avenue, downtown Buenos Aires, c. 1880.

Upon the designation of the Viceroyalty of the Río de la Plata by the Spanish Empire in 1776, the "Road of the Kingdom of Heaven" leading into Buenos Aires from the east was designated a Camino Real, a "Royal Road" fit for a Viceroy, and afforded improvements and some security. This Royal Road of the West, by 1782, traveled to Mendoza, a city over 600 miles (970 km) to the west (roughly along the modern National Highway 7). Dubbed Federation Road by the paramount Governor Juan Manuel de Rosas in 1836, it was renamed in honor of former President Bernardino Rivadavia in 1857, following the reestablishment of constitutional rule.

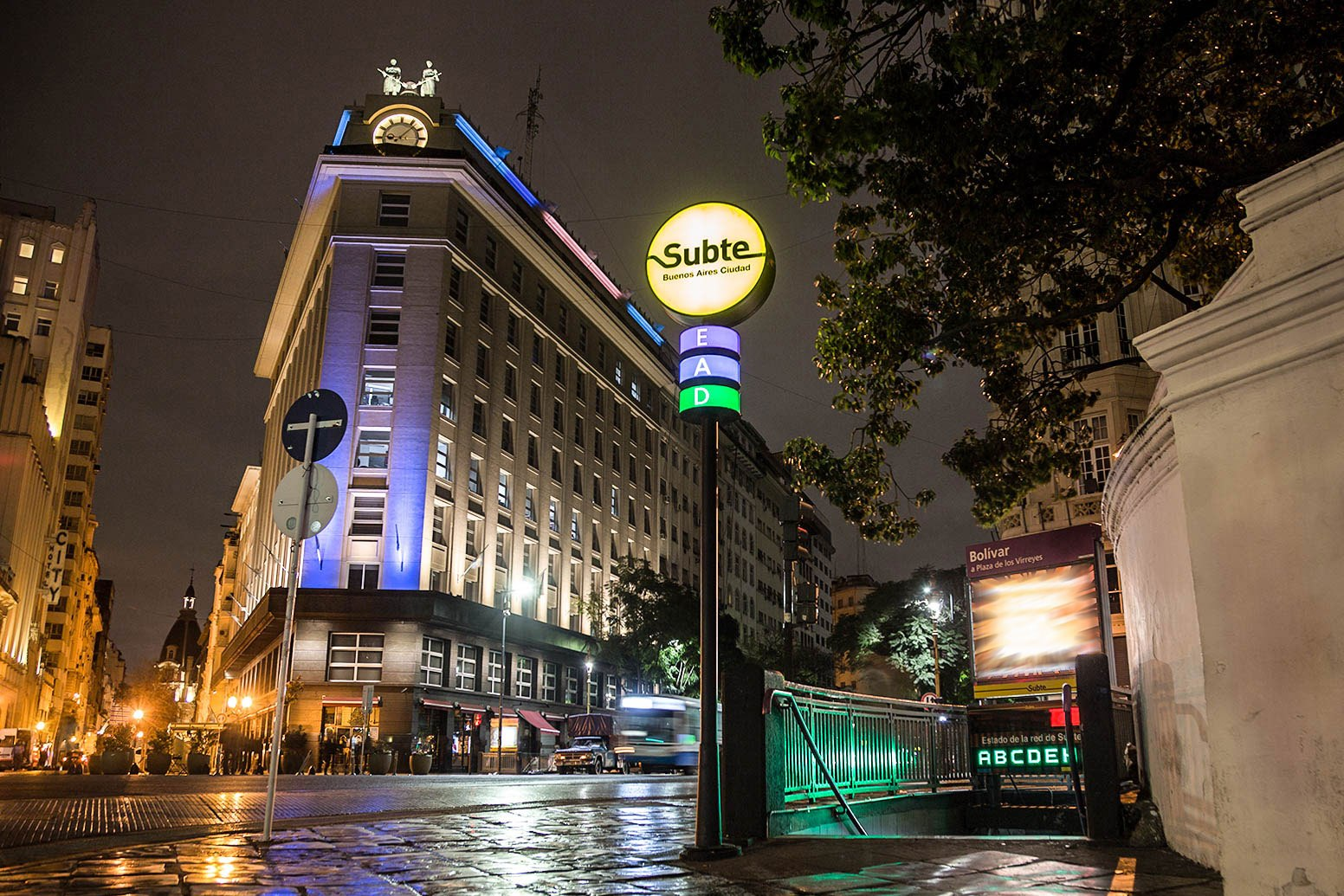
Rivadavia Avenue subway between Diagonal Norte Avenue.

The Buenos Aires Metro, inaugurated in 1913, was extended to Rivadavia Avenue in 1926, whereby 11 of the 16 stations on line were built underneath the avenue. Rivadavia was on Buenos Aires' first bus line in 1928, a development that marked the beginning of the end for the city's intricate trolley system. The establishment of the National Highway Bureau in 1932 led to the 1935 designation of the avenue, west of the Federal District, as part of National Highway 7. This change encouraged the rapid development of the suburbs west of Buenos Aires, something which, by 1970, had made the avenue among the most congested in the metro area. A rerouting of Highway 7 north of the avenue began taking shape in the late 1970s and the resulting expressway between Buenos Aires and Luján was completed in 1988. Absent since 1962, a Historic Tramway Line was inaugurated along the Caballito section of Rivadavia Avenue in 1980.

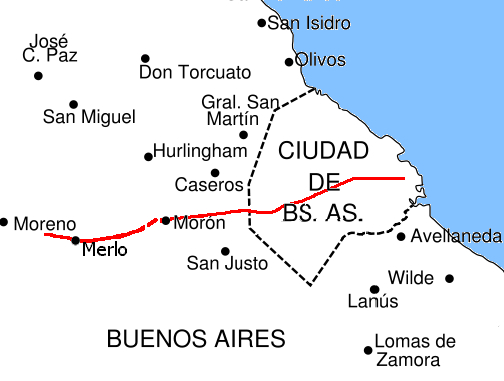
Approximate route

== Itinerary ==
Avenida Rivadavia begins at a crosswalk between the Casa Rosada and the State Intelligence Bureau, on the northeast corner of Buenos Aires' storied Plaza de Mayo. Running westward along the plaza, the avenue passes along the National Bank of Argentina, the Metropolitan Cathedral of Buenos Aires and City Hall before entering the old financial district.

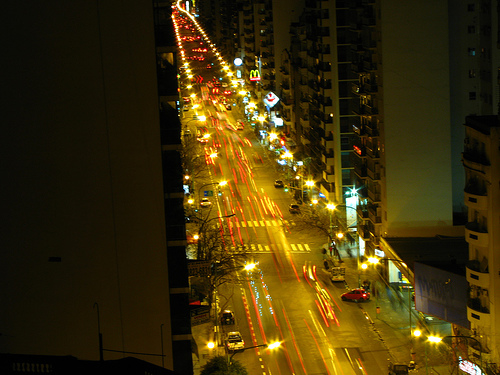
Rivadavia avenue night.

Crossing the pedestrian Calle Florida and the massive Avenida 9 de Julio, Rivadavia merges with Avenida de Mayo at Congressional Plaza, whereby it passes between the Argentine Congress and the Art Nouveau Café El Molino. Passing through Plaza Miserere in the Balvanera area, nearby points of interest include the eclectic Venetian Casa de los Pavos Reales, and, in Almagro, the Art Nouveau Café Las Violetas. Along Rivadavia Park, in the Caballito area, the avenue affords a view of the Monument to Simón Bolívar, founding father to Bolivia, Colombia, Ecuador and Venezuela.

Nearly 10 miles (16 km) west of its outset by the Casa Rosada, Rivadavia Avenue passes under the General Paz Beltway into Ciudadela, thus leaving the Federal District for the Province of Buenos Aires. The thoroughfare continues through the Buenos Aires suburbs of Morón, Castelar, Ituzaingó, San Antonio de Padua and Merlo before crossing the Reconquista River and becoming Bartolomé Mitre Avenue. Mitre Avenue travels west another 2.5 miles (4.0 km) before merging with Piovano Avenue in Moreno.

Avenida Rivadavia
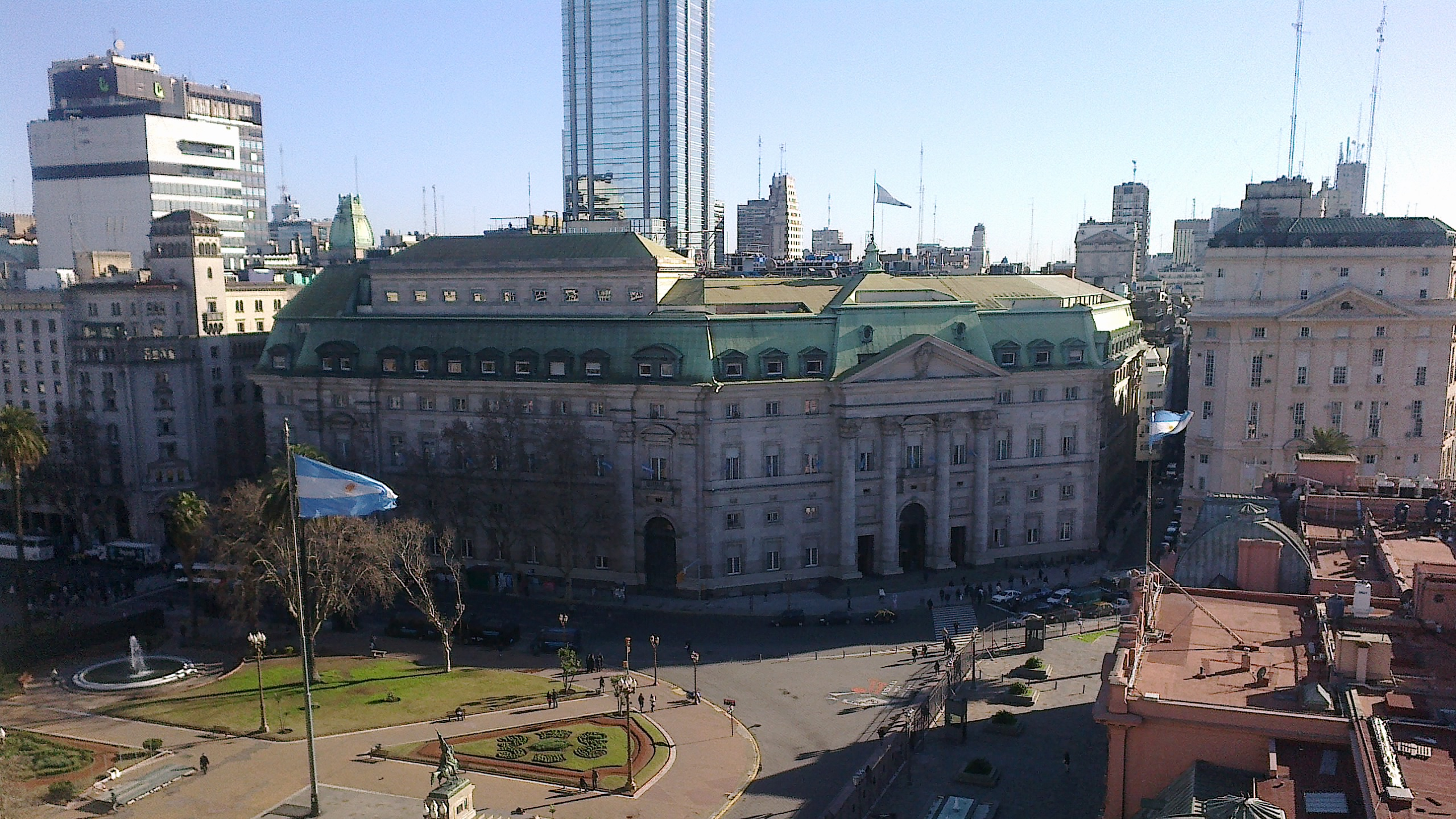
Along Plaza de Mayo, Banco Nación and the headquarters of the Federal Intelligence Agency.

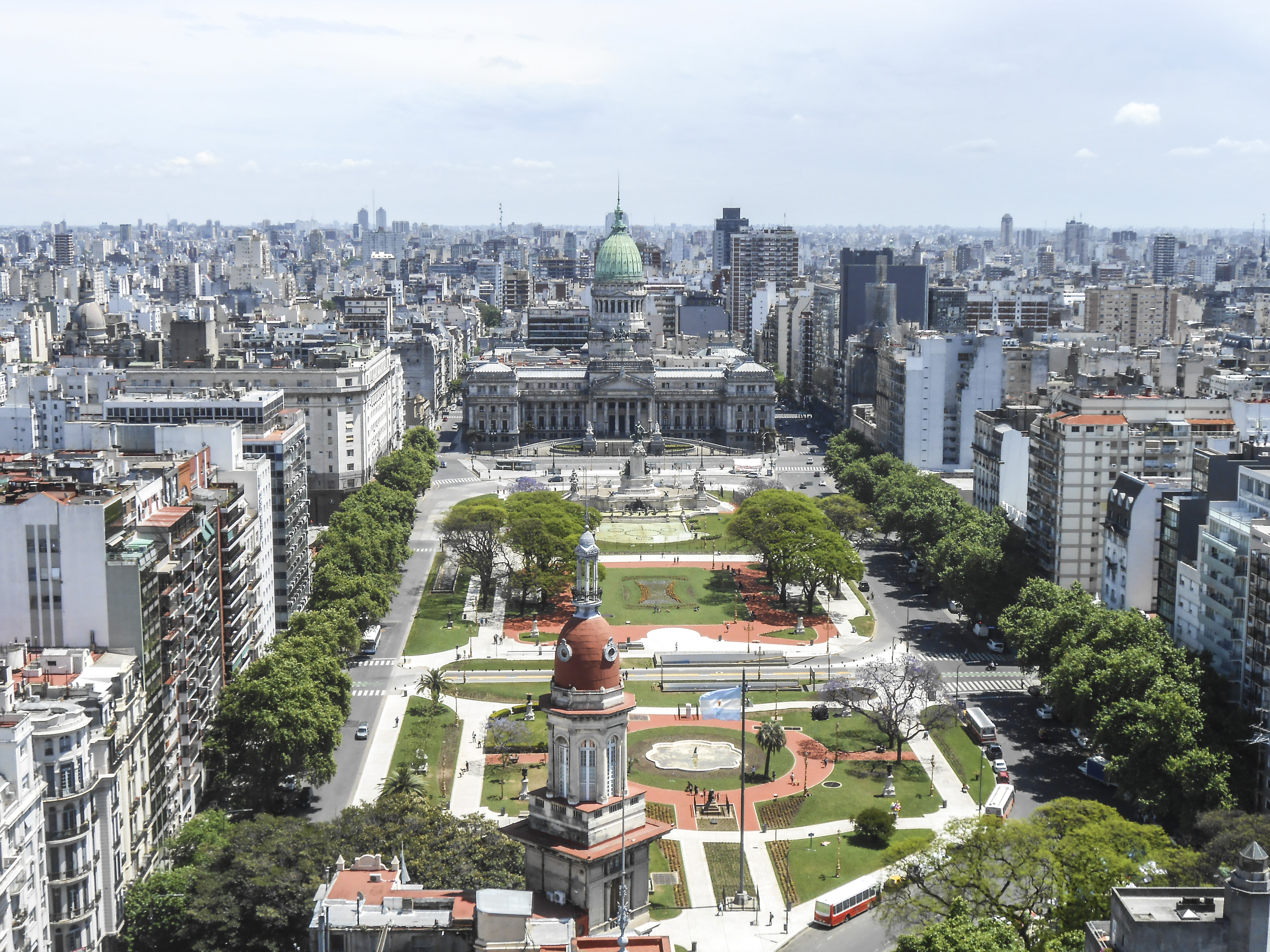
Rivadavia Avenue crossing the Palace of the Argentine National Congress and Congressional Plaza.

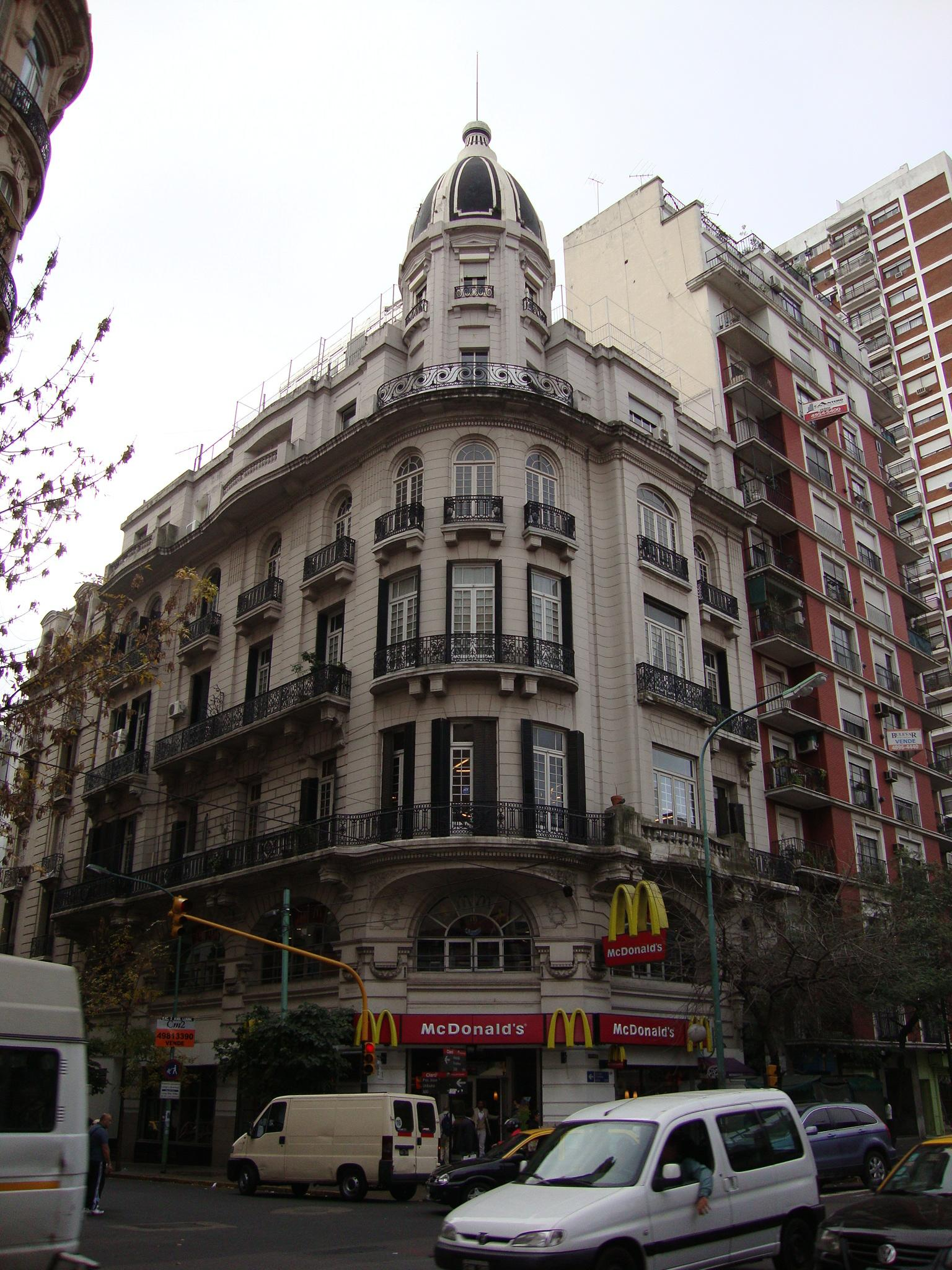
Rivadavia and Uriburu, Balvanera section.

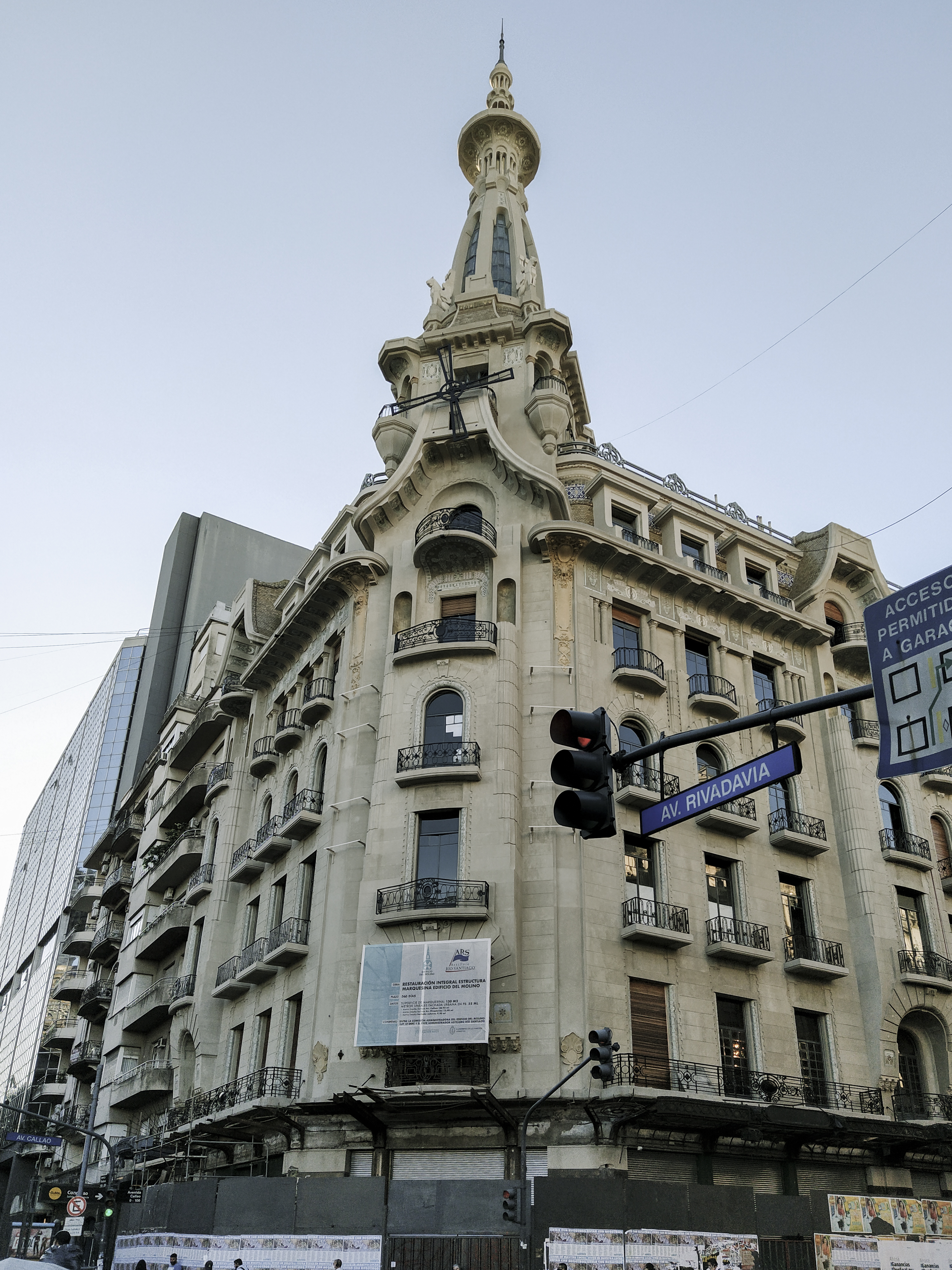
Confitería del Molino, Callao avenue corner.

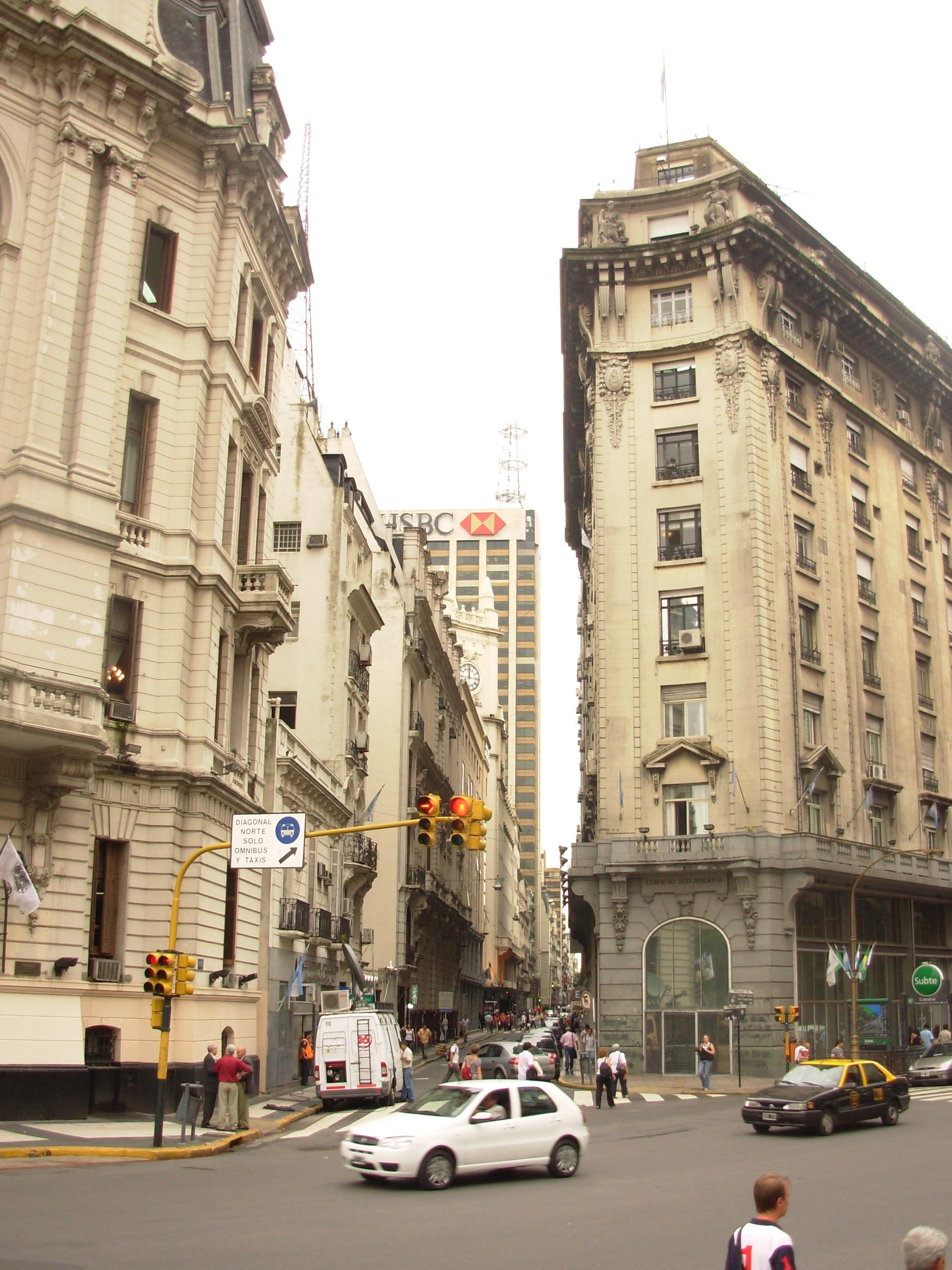
Rivadavia Avenue between Diagonal Norte Avenue.

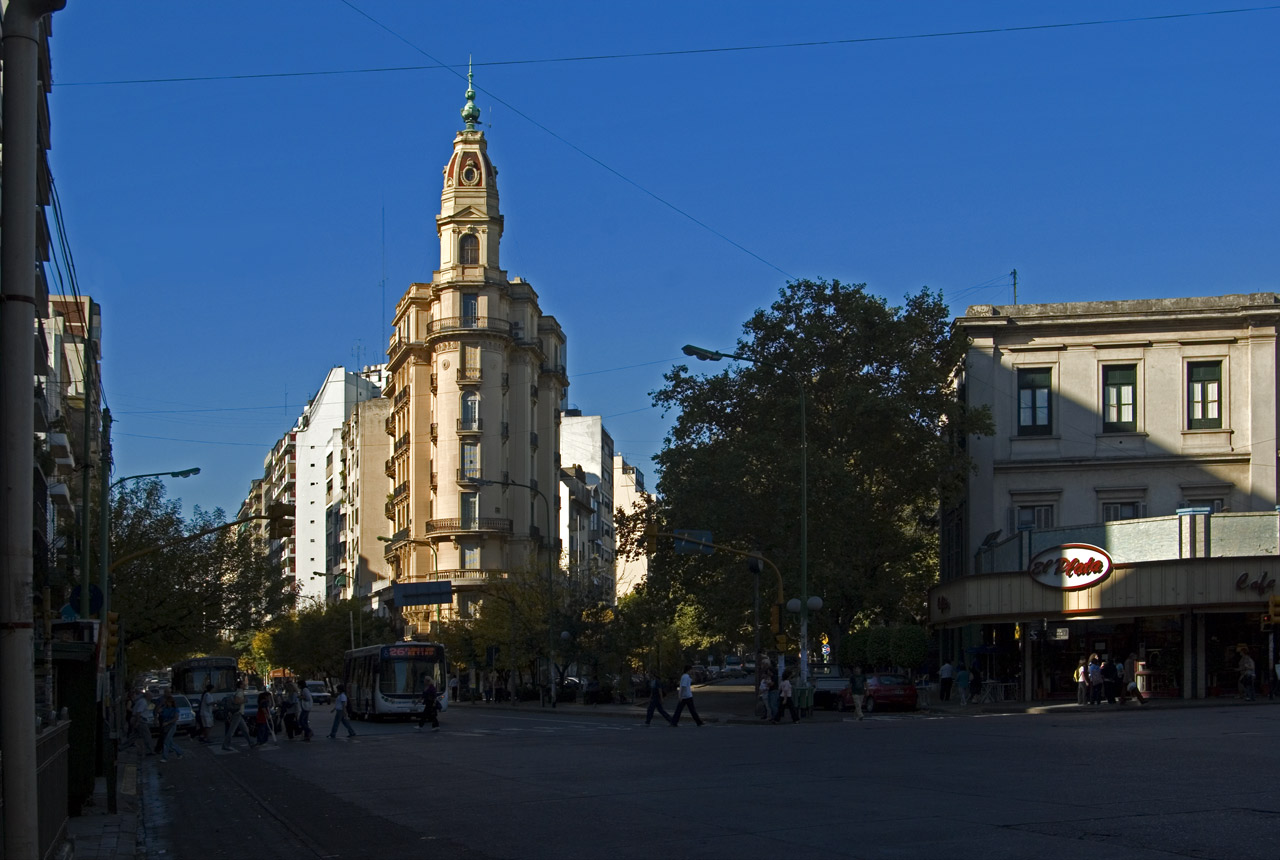
Palacio Raggio, Almagro section.
