= Figo =

Figo or FIGO may refer to:

- Luís Figo (born 1972), retired Portuguese footballer
- Figo (footballer) (born 1986), Cape Verdean footballer, legal name Osvaldo Tavares Oliveira
- the original form of the Italian family name Piccio
- International Federation of Gynecology and Obstetrics, a non-governmental organisation (Federation Internationale de Gynecologie et d'Obstetrique)
  - FIGO classification of ovarian cancer
  - FIGO classification of uterine bleeding
- Ponta Figo, São Tomé and Príncipe, a village in São Tomé Island
- Michelia figo, an evergreen tree
- Ford Figo, a car manufactured by Ford

== See also ==
- Figa (disambiguation)
- Vigo (disambiguation)
