= Kónya Gyuláné Schéfer Teréz =

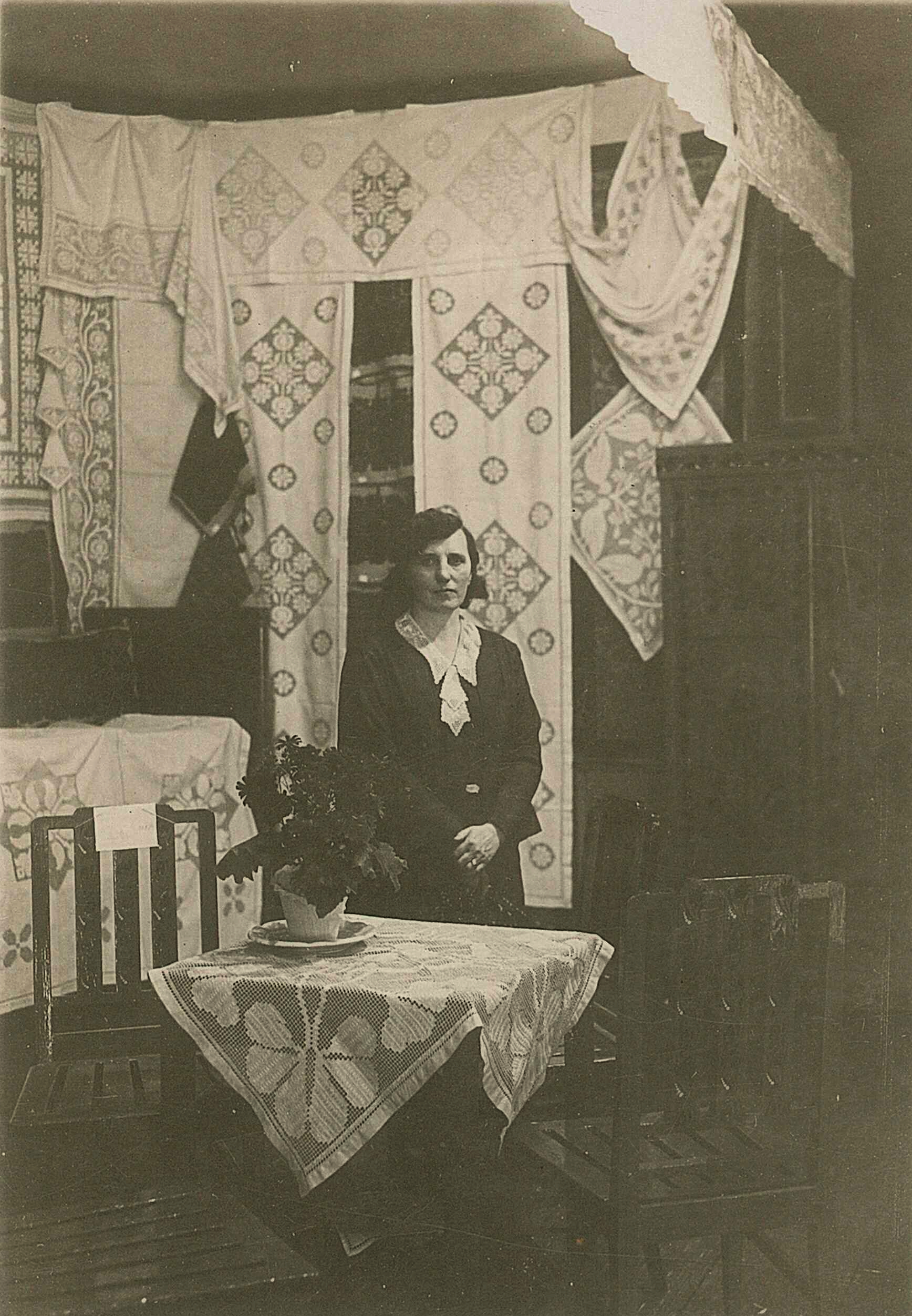
Kónya Gyuláné Schéfer Teréz with hardanger peasant embroidery at an exhibition in the 1930s.

Teréz Kónya (born Teréz Schéfer; 1884–1971) was a prominent and influential designer, collector and promoter of traditional stitched textile patterns in Hungarian Transylvania. She raised interest in Kalotaszeg peasant embroidery between the two World Wars in the predominantly Hungarian Transylvanian ethnographic region in Romania, Kalotaszeg. In the interwar period she was the Hungarian Reformed Church pastor's wife in Văleni (Hungarian: Magyarvalkó), and collected old Kalotaszeg peasant embroidery patterns. She also created new patterns based on the motifs found on other folk art items such as carved gates, and the painted panels and carvings in churches.

The village of Văleni lies 3 kilometres from the village where Gyarmathy Zsigáné Hory Etelka (1843–1910) was born. Teréz Kónya can be seen as continuing Gyarmathy Zsigáné’s work popularising the local embroidery.

== Early life ==
Teréz Schéfer was born into a middle class family in Cluj-Napoca (Hungarian Kolozsvár) at the end of the Austro Hungarian empire. She was the second eldest child of six. Her father, András Schéfer (1854–1904), was a tailor born in Mezőberény who, searching for work, moved to the eastern part of the empire and opened a tailor shop in Kolozsvár. In the 1870s he applied machine embroidery techniques to the peasant man’s szűr or mantle for the first time, thus creating the distinctive Kolozsvár szűr. His craft received international recognition when it was awarded a medal at the Brussels International Exposition of 1897. As the demand for his szűr continued to grow, he would travel to the weekly market in Huedin (Hungarian: Bánffyhunyad) to sell them and maybe pick up Kalotaszeg traditional sewing for his wife's growing collection.

== Education and early work ==
The Schéfer family paid attention to the education of their children. Teréz Schéfer graduated from the Women’s National Teacher Training College in 1904, where she was part of a self study circle and her classes included handicraft and drawing. In 1907 she became the first female teacher at the Reformed Church College primary school where she was a great success. She left her post in 1908 when she became engaged to Gyula Kónya, a trainee minister in the Reformed Church in Hungary.

=== Cojocna/Kolozs (1909-1921) ===
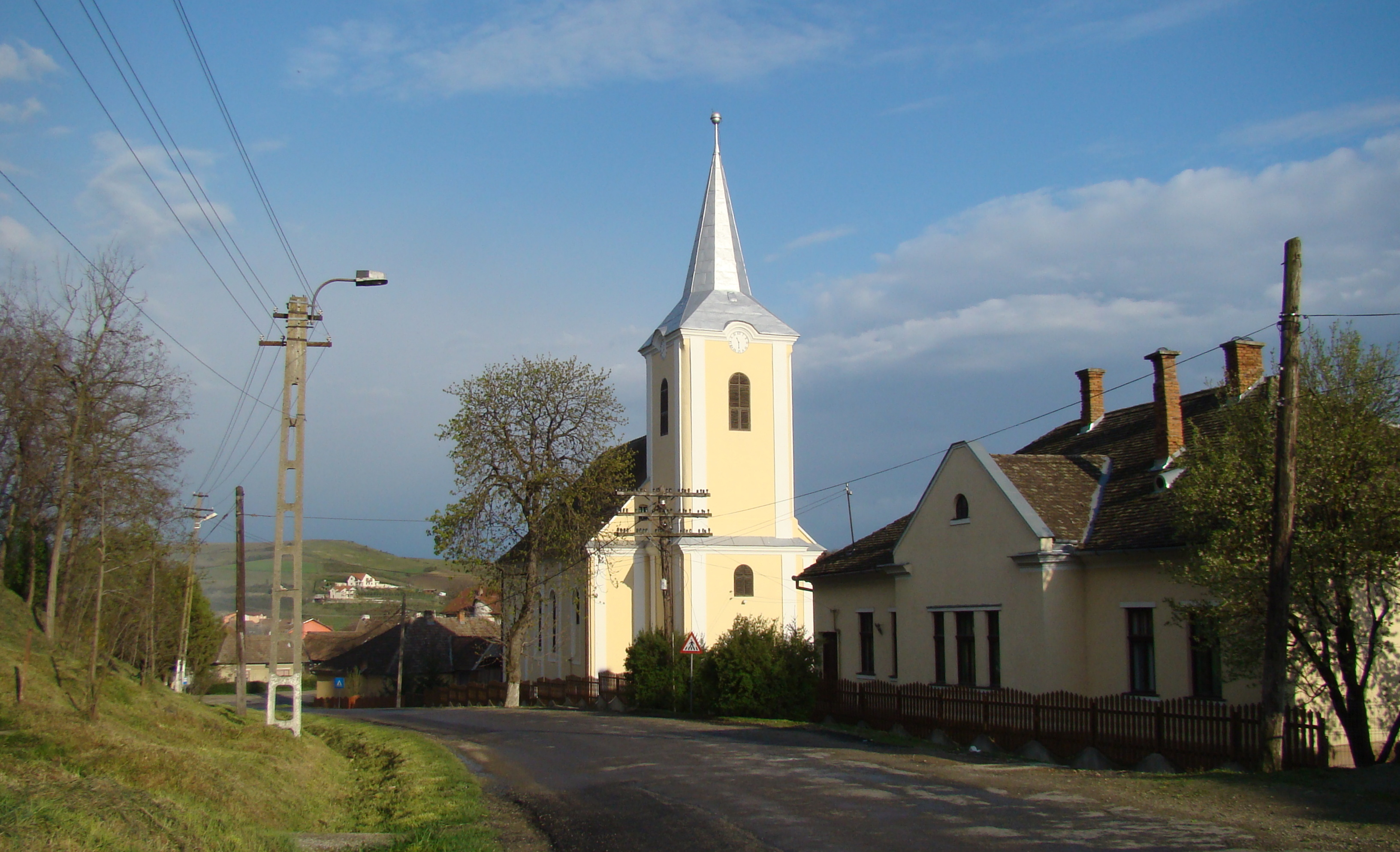
The Reformed church in Cojocna

In 1909, she married and joined her husband in his first ministry in the village of Cojocna (Hungarian Kolozs), close to Cluj. They established a Sunday school, focussing also on more practical and creative activities. Teréz's interest in embroidery was soon apparent. In 1910 the church received the first donation in the name of Kónya Gyula, a small cloth of filet lace donated by Teréz and used to decorate the centre of a table. It is still in the parish collection today .

In 1911 Teréz was instrumental in forming the churchwomen’s guild which immediately started raising money for a new communion table.

== Life and work in Văleni/Magyarvalkó ==
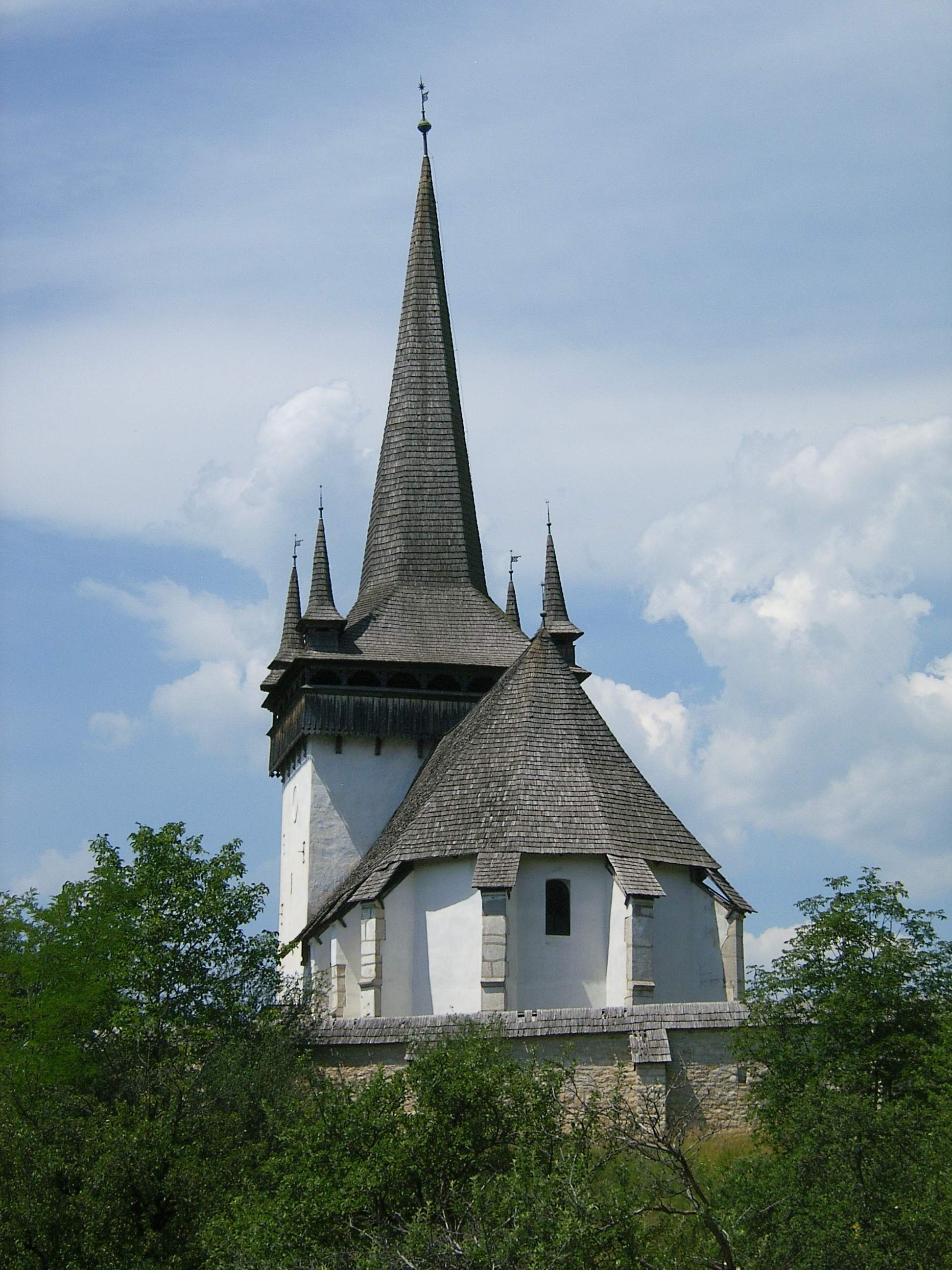
The protestant church of Văleni built in the middle ages.

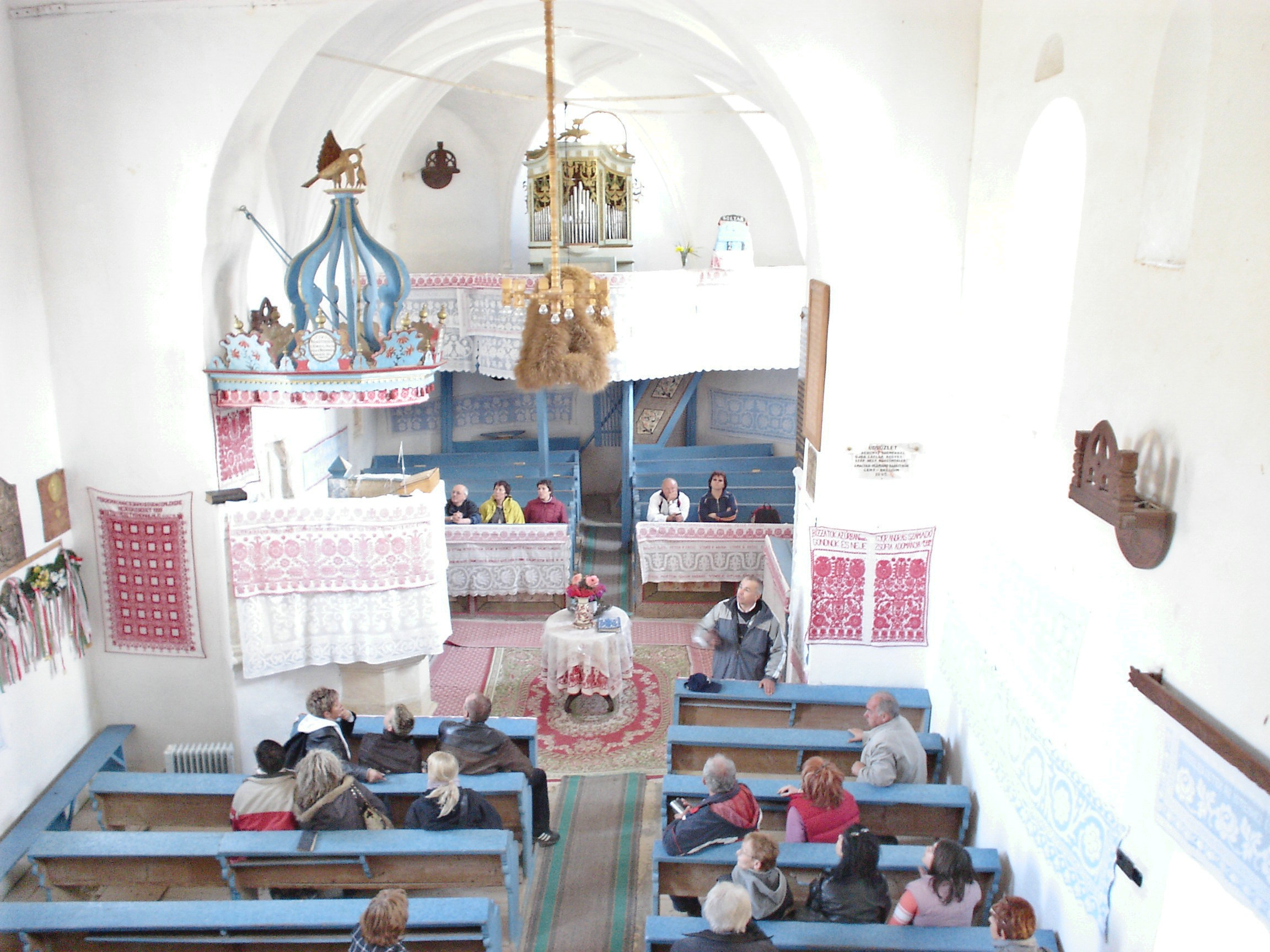
The interior of the church at the turn of the century with the embroideries gifted to the church still on display. Some of these were made in the time of Kónyáné.

In 1921, Gyula Kónya resigned from his position in Kolozs and took over the ministry in the parish church in Văleni (Hungarian Magyarvalkó) on the southern most fringes of Kalotaszeg. Magyarvalkó is one of the five most representative centres of Kalotaszeg open chain stitch/nagyírásos embroidery. After settling in, the Kónyas formed relationships with many of the leading figures in post-war Hungarian society, including architect and politician Károly Kós, Bishop László Ravasz and his wife Margit Bartók and mayor and town planner György Bernády. Some of them provided Teréz Kónyá with old embroidery patterns from their collections to copy.

Teréz Kónyá took an active interest in the interior decoration of the old Magyarvalkó church. In 1923 the first purpose-made piece of Kalotaszeg sewing was donated to the church - a cloth to wrap around and decorate the pulpit. She designed the Hardanger (Hungarian vagdalásos) whitework embroidery, donated the thread and homespun cotton fabric and the confirmation group for that year organised the sewing. From this time she was instrumental in planning Hardanger sewing for confirmation groups to donate to the church, along with occasional pieces sewn to commemorate births and deaths.

=== Organising the embroidery cottage industry ===
Kónyáné worked with Albrecht Lajosné Bónis Irén in the Transylvanian Reformed Women’s Guild from at least 1924, providing employment for the women in Kalotaszeg villages. Around the same time, in Văleni, she started organising the cottage industry. With the help of two local women, she developed a network in the surrounding villages who came to the manse to collect the loose Hardanger paper patterns, the cloth and sufficient thread to embroider the pieces. These were later sold by Kónyáné in the cities or at exhibitions. She called on her customers to act conscientiously, and be prepared to pay more, ‘as this is the only way to ensure the right quality’ and a reasonable payment for the working women.

Beside organising the production and selling of peasant embroidery, Kónyané made new designs reusing old patterns, elements and motifs. By doing this, she was able to fuse the old and traditional with the modern: designing bags of varying shapes and size, shoes and belts.

=== Fairs and exhibitions popularising Kalotaszeg sewing ===
By the late 1920s, folk art exhibitions were being organised more frequently by the church guilds across Transylvania, in neighbouring Hungary and a little further afield.

In 1927 she was able to present her work abroad: among the exhibits at a Transylvania folk art exhibition in Berlin sewing was sent from Văleni. The main promoter of the exhibition was Bethlen Györgyné Josika Paula leader of the Transylvanian Catholic Women’s Guild who declared the reputation of Kónya Gyuláné guaranteed that the ‘most beautiful costumes in Kalotaszeg’ would be present at the exhibition.

Between 1930 and 1937 Bethlen Mária (1882–1970), president of the Reformed Women’s Guild in Turda took craft, including that produced by Kónyáné’s women, to 22 places with the International Travelling Exhibition. By 1932 she had successfully sold one million lei worth of goods (equivalent to $137.000 US today), despite the economic crisis, thanks to the strength of support from patriotic Romanians and Hungarians. In 1934 Bethlen Mária ordered 1,000 pieces of embroidery from Kónyáné for exhibitions in Bucharest and Szolnok. They sold well. The exhibitions attracted the attention of Romanian historian Nicolae Iorga; leading feminist political activist Alexandrina Cantecuzino, and leaders of various church denominations, who all shared the common aim to preserve historic patterns and provide an income for struggling villagers.

In the 1930s, Kónyáné, independently, started to regularly participate in smaller exhibitions dressed in local Magyarvalkó peasant costume. Until 1938, she was a regular at the exhibitions of the Transylvanian Economic Association, the umbrella organisation of the ÁGISZ Cooperative (General Economic and Industrial Cooperative) and Pitvar Cooperative.

Kónyáné knew the best promotion was to obtain orders from those most in the public eye. People from Magyarvalkó remember stories such as how at one of the Budapest Trade fairs that Kónyáné attended, she proudly secured a large commission for thirty cushions from Horthy Miklós (Regent of Hungary 1921–44) to grace his summer house. In autumn 1932, she went one better when King Carol II (King of Romania 1930–40) placed an order at the large Transylvanian Economic Association exhibition in Cluj.

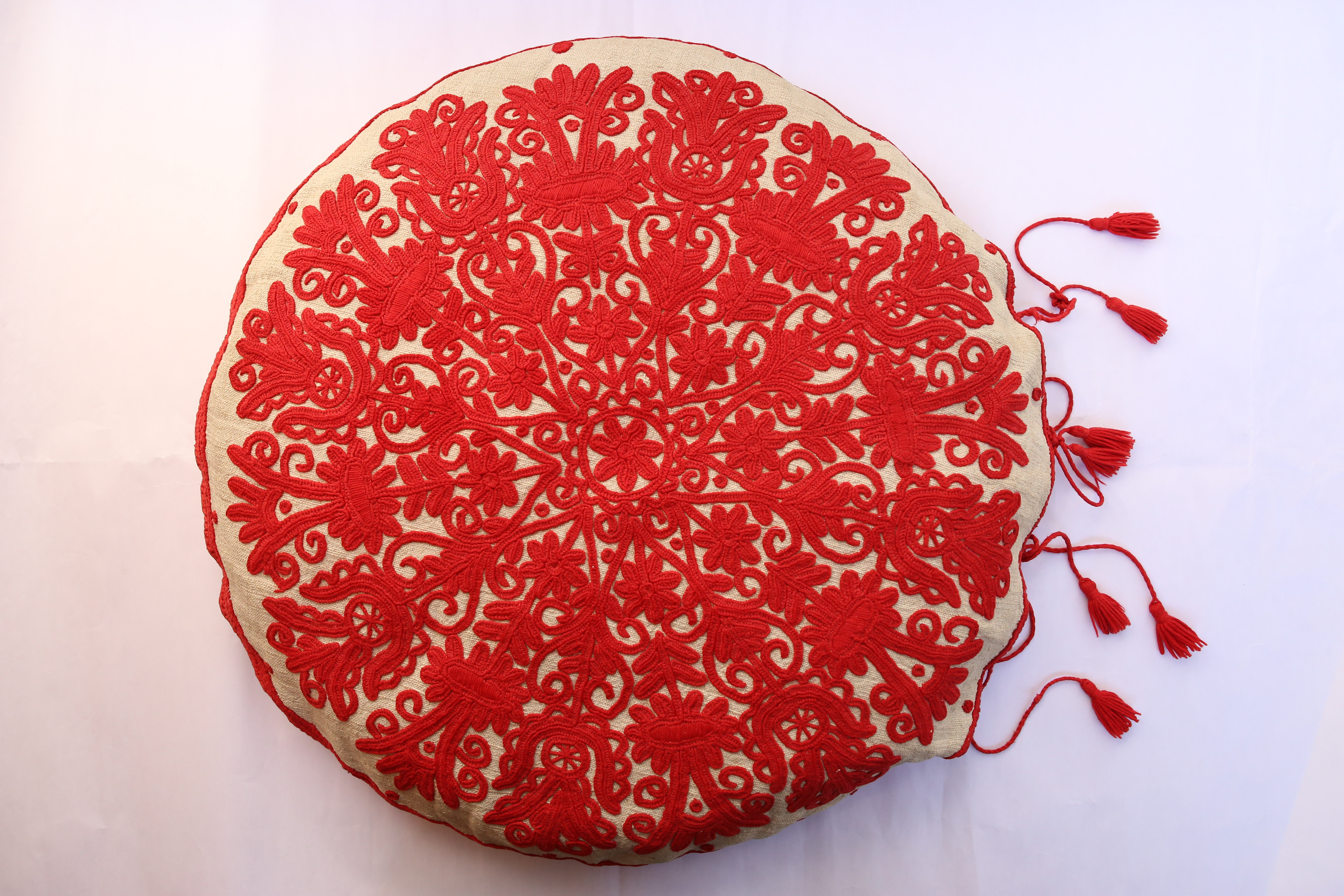
Írásos pattern by Kónyáné on a cushion cover.

=== Patterns collections ===
From 1928 onwards Kónyáné began to gather and organise patterns into collections. In total five pattern collections were made. Three for the open chain/nagyírásos and two for the hardanger. The earliest nagyírásos collection dated 1928 is two part and made up of older patterns gathered from women in the village and other early sources. Her second nagyírásos collection works up these earlier sourced patterns to use for making certain items popular at that time such as pillow cases and tablecloths. The third collection, organised during World War II, contains her own nagyírásos creations for modern items at the time, such as tea cosies; curtains; place mats etc.

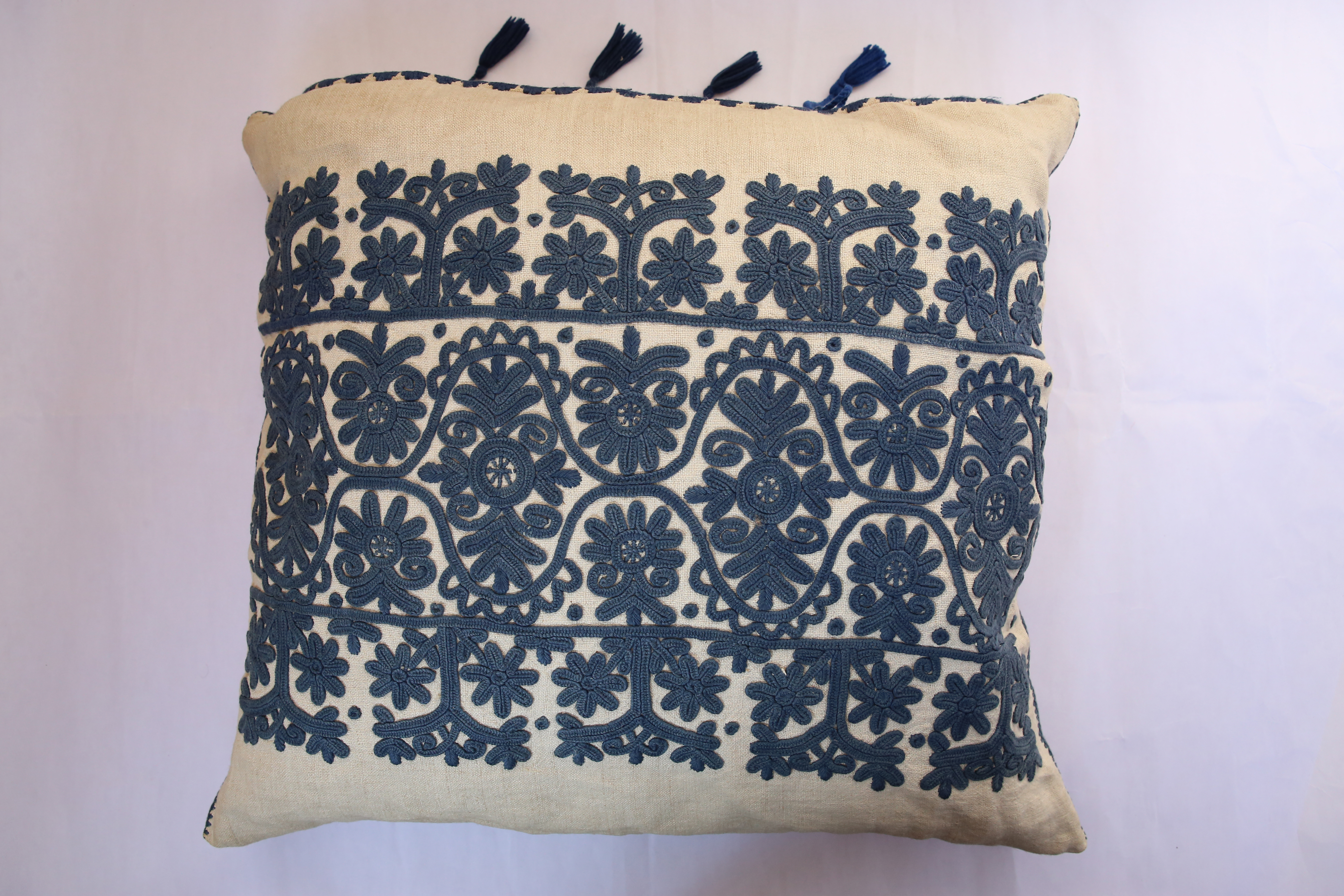
A more traditional style írásos pattern by Kónyáné on a cushion cover.

The hardanger collection with patterns created and used during the 1920s and 1930s is divided into two volumes.

All the pattern collections are currently held in private ownership.

=== The war years ===
From 1940, and during the isolation of the war years, Kónyáné redrew and organised many embroidery patterns into albums. In 1940 the Second Vienna Award saw Northern Transylvania returned to Hungary, leaving Văleni stranded in Romanian territory. As the war continued and the fighting got nearer, the manse was repeatedly searched and she became increasingly concerned about the safety of her patterns so on the afternoon of 14 November 1943, Kónyáné and her right hand woman in the village, Pituj Erzsébet hid all the pattern albums, loose sewing patterns and sewing collections – a total of 8 sacks and a trunk – in the church crypt in the area below the pulpit steps. In her diary, she describes how they also "put a wooden board under the bags so they would not touch the ground and left the result of twenty years work between the dusty skulls and bones".

In August 1944 her husband Kónya was taken by Romanian soldiers to Călăţele, a nearby village. His wife visited him with food parcels until he was moved to Beliș, about 40 km away from Văleni and from there to Alba Iulia. Kónya Gyula was brought home on 20 October by Russian troops, but he was much weakened and in 1945 he died.

== Later years and death ==
When Kónyáné was widowed she had to leave the manse in Văleni. She returned to her birth place, Cluj, where she dedicated the rest of her life to Christian missionary work, working as director of the Reformed Church old people’s home and collecting religious taxes.

For some years Kónyáné still travelled regularly to Huedin Tuesday market to meet the villagers, mainly the women of Văleni, to whom she continued to give sewing commissions. In this way she could make a difference to the lives of women whose husbands had been deported to forced labour camps in the Soviet Union, and those widowed with families to feed following the war. But the realities of the new communist rule of Romania brought laws which forbade pastors’ wives from any involvement in community work. This crackdown coincided with her hip becoming too painful to ignore.

In her last years she was bed bound, her sister, Bözsi and adopted daughter, Rózsika nursed her until her death in 1971.

== Legacy ==
Kónyáné's lasting influence began to be noticed during the more relaxed communist regime of 1968–74, when minorities had more freedom to celebrate their traditions and heritage. Even beyond 1974, a series of pattern collections were collected and published by the Kriterion Publishing House which included the Kalotaszegi nagyírásos. After the fall of the communist regime, new publications started to recognise the importance of Kónyáné’s work.

Kónyáné's talent, energy, warmth and determination led to Văleni becoming the centre for Kalotaszeg sewing in the years prior to World War II and paved the way for another pattern-drawing woman (Hungarian íróasszony) to emerge. Vince Zsebe Kata Györgyné (1886 – 1974), known as Gyuricáné, who preserved Kónya Gyuláné's patterns and, being a peasant woman with a real appreciation of folk art, went on to create beautiful patterns of her own.
