= Piccio =

- Pronunciation: Italian: [ˈpittʃo]
- Language: Italian

Origin
- Language: Portuguese
- Origin: Figo
- Meaning: Fig
- Region of origin: Ottoman Empire, Republic of Venice

The Piccio family is a family of Portuguese Jewish origin. It has established branches in Italy, the Philippines and Turkey. Members also reside in fewer numbers in other countries.

The current form of the family’s name is an Italianized standardization by notaries in Rome of [ˈpiɟu], which in turn was a Turkified rendering of the original Portuguese Figo (pronounced [ˈfiɣu]).

== Members ==
Notable members include:

- Azaria Piccio, Venetian rabbi;
- Carlo Piccio, Philippine swimmer;
- Gino Piccio, Italian priest;
- Giuseppe Piccio, Italian literary critic;
- Mosè Piccio, Ottoman rabbi and lexicographer;
- Mordekay Piccio, Israeli paramilitary;
- Pier Ruggero Piccio, Italian World War I general and founding Chief of Staff of the Italian Air Force;
- Vicente Piccio, Jr., Philippine major general, Air Force Chief, and former Mayor.
