= Figa =

Figa may refer to:

- Figa, Bistrița-Năsăud, a village and spa in Beclean, Romania
- Figa, Slovakia, a village and municipality in Banská Bystrica Region of southern Slovakia
- Fig sign or figa, a hand gesture
- FIGLA or transcription factor FIGa, a protein that in humans is encoded by the FIGLA gene
- Figa, an Italian profanity
- Phillip S. Figa (1951–2008), U.S. District Judge

== See also ==
- Figa la Sarra, an archaeological site in Corsica
- FIGAS or Falkland Islands Government Air Service
- Figo (disambiguation)
- Alessandro Figà Talamanca (1938–2023), an Italian mathematician
