= Mordechai Petcho =

Irgun deputy commander and IDF military officer

Mordechai Petcho מרדכי פצ׳ו
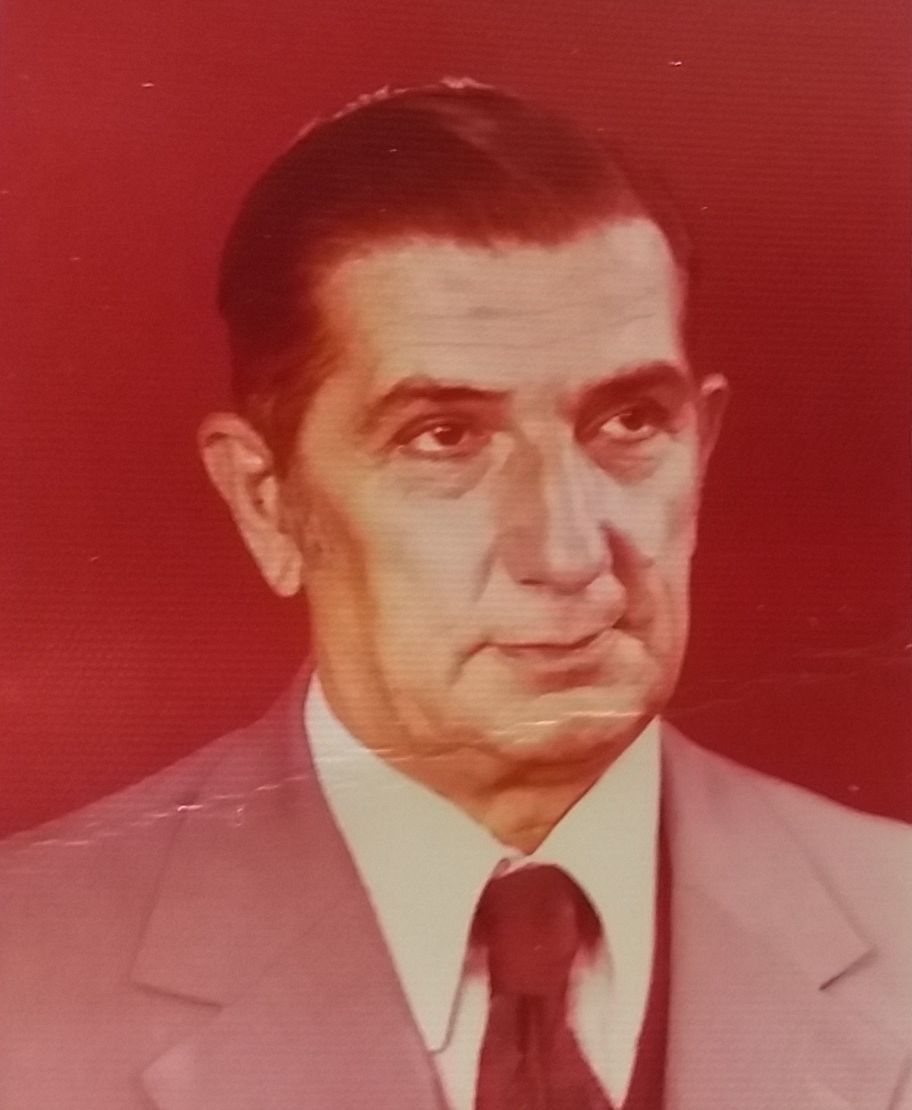
- Mordechai Petcho, Israel, 1991
- Native name: Mordekay Peço
- Nicknames: Ha-Ṭurqi (הטורקי, 'The Turk')
- Born: 15 July 1916; İzmir, Ottoman Empire
- Died: 27 January 1992 (aged 75) Israel
- Buried: Israel
- Allegiance: Israel
- Branch: Irgun; IDF
- Service years: 1935–1949
- Rank: Gundar (Irgun)
- Conflicts: The Irgun's attack upon Jaffa
- Spouse: Joya Poppens

Mordechai Petcho (Hebrew: מרדכי פצ׳ו; Turkish: Mordekay Peço; July 15, 1916 – January 27, 1992) was an Israeli military officer who had earlier served as deputy commander of the Irgun under Ya'akov Meridor.

== Biography ==
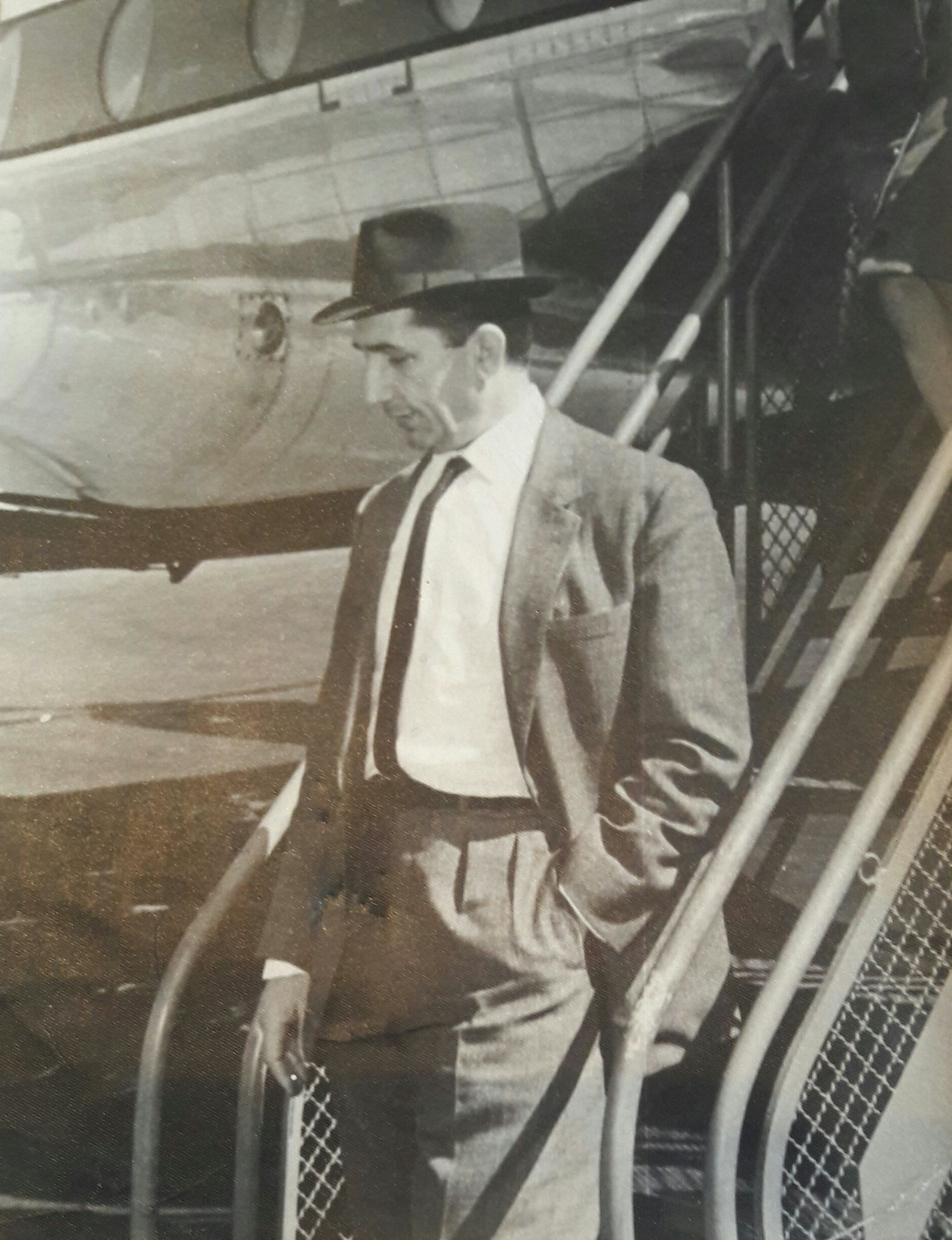
Petcho arriving in Córdoba from Buenos Aires as a Jewish Agency envoy, 1966

Petcho was born in the Ottoman coastal city of İzmir to İlyas Peço (Hebrew: אליהו פצ׳ו, romanized: Eliyahu Pečo) and Zimbol (Aviva) Curiel (Hebrew: זימבול (אביבה) קוריאל, romanized: Zimbol (Abibah) Quryel). His father was a scion of the Venetian rabbi Azaria Piccio while his mother was a member of the Curiel noble family; both of his parents' families were of Portuguese heritage. The younger Petcho graduated from the Lycée Saint-Joseph in Kadıköy where Jews, Muslims and Christians studied together following Atatürk's reforms. According to Haim Shikiar, a friend of Petcho from Turkey who worked as a clerk at the Israel Discount Bank, Petcho excelled in mathematics, skipped a grade, and stood up for other Jews against antisemitic harassment at school.

In 1934, he visited the Land of Israel for the first time and returned to Izmir. In 1935, when he found out that the British had restricted the issuance of certificates (visas), he purchased a tourist visa, left his family and went alone to Palestine. After immigrating, he destroyed his passport, became "illegal" and then moved to Jerusalem. For a living, he worked in the Jewish Agency for Israel and also as a cover for his activities in the resistance movement of the Irgun. His colleague, Haim Ezer, also from Izmir, introduced him to the Irgun. In the Irgun, he served under the command of a graduate of the Rabbi Center Yeshiva and later the Irgun commander, David Raziel.

In the Hasmonean Alliance, he was a commander in the opening trio of the youth headquarters, along with Rabbi Moshe Segal, who "blew the shofar" at the Western Wall and was the spiritual shepherd, Baruch Duvdevani, the statesman, when Petcho's role was the military organization. Petcho liked order and discipline, was responsible for the arrangements and ceremonies, excelled in diligence, organization, creativity, war tricks, classifying active squads, and adhering to tasks. His subordinates did not know the real names of their squad members nor the corresponding squads. Petcho steadfastly refused to be photographed. As a result, every time the British intelligence published photos of wanted persons on the billboards with their names under the pictures, in the case of Petcho a blank square appeared.

On July 16, 1939, during his underground activity, he was arrested in broad daylight on King George Street in Jerusalem, but he managed to smuggle a note on his arrest into one of the stores which assisted the organization without the detectives and police officers noticing. Following the arrest by the detective, he was required to cooperate and to provide the names of his members in the Irgun but he refused to cooperate. As a result, he was tortured severely which did not exist even during the Turkish rule but he did not reveal information. Segal, who was also detained, heard from Petcho about the torture, and recorded his comments on the kosher napkin which he got from his wife. The napkin was forwarded to Aryeh Altman, who sent a report to Ze'ev Jabotinsky. Jabotinsky communicated this to the British parliament's deputy Josiah Wedgwood, who submitted an urgent query in the parliament, a few days before the outbreak of World War II. At the same time, a complaint was filed with the Geneva Mandate Committee, and the British Mandate was reprimanded. When the torture of other members was revealed, the British Mandate got a disgrace mark.

On August 24, 1939, Petcho was taken out of the dungeon in Jerusalem and was put in detention at Latrun Prison with Raziel, Meridor and Avraham Stern. After the Irgun's attack on Jaffa, in which Petcho participated, he made his way to Jerusalem on Burma Road and joined the Irgun fighters in Jerusalem who were fighting for the liberation of the Old City. In 1949, he was recruited into the IDF, and due to his gundar rank, he joined the officer corps. During the Suez Crisis he was drafted to the military reserve force, and was released from the IDF afterward.

In August 1959 Petcho was appointed to the Composition Committee for the list of candidates of the Herut Movement for the Tel Aviv-Yafo Municipality.

In January–February 1964, Petcho received a certificate of being a prisoner of Zion for his imprisonment for six months in Jerusalem and Tzrifin, with the signatures of Menachem Begin, Eitan Livni, chairman of the Irgun Alliance in Israel, and Yehuda Borochov, a member of Medals and Awards Committee. From the Deputy Minister of Defense, Mordechai Tzipori, he received the campaign medal of the Irgun.

Duvdevani, as the director of the Jewish Agency Immigration Department, appointed him as an immigration emissary in Argentina from June 1965 until August 1967. During his mission, Petcho also made diplomatic connections with Uruguay where his cousin Jak Petcho, president of the Spanish Jewish community, lived in Montevideo. Petcho's neighbor who lived in the building at Avenida Medrano in Buenos Aires was a Syrian Jew, Dr. Solomon Halac. Dr. Halac was a senior orthopedic physician through whom Petcho held conferences and home classes for Jewish physicians. Petcho encouraged them to immigrate to Israel where there was a great demand for doctors, especially orthopedic doctors, due to war injuries.

In 1951, he married a fellow Turk, Joya Poppens (Hebrew: יהודית פופנס, romanized: Yehudit Popens). He left four descendants.

Petcho spoke Hebrew, Ladino, French and English.
