= Café Las Violetas =

Coordinates: 34°36′40.2″S 58°25′15.1″W

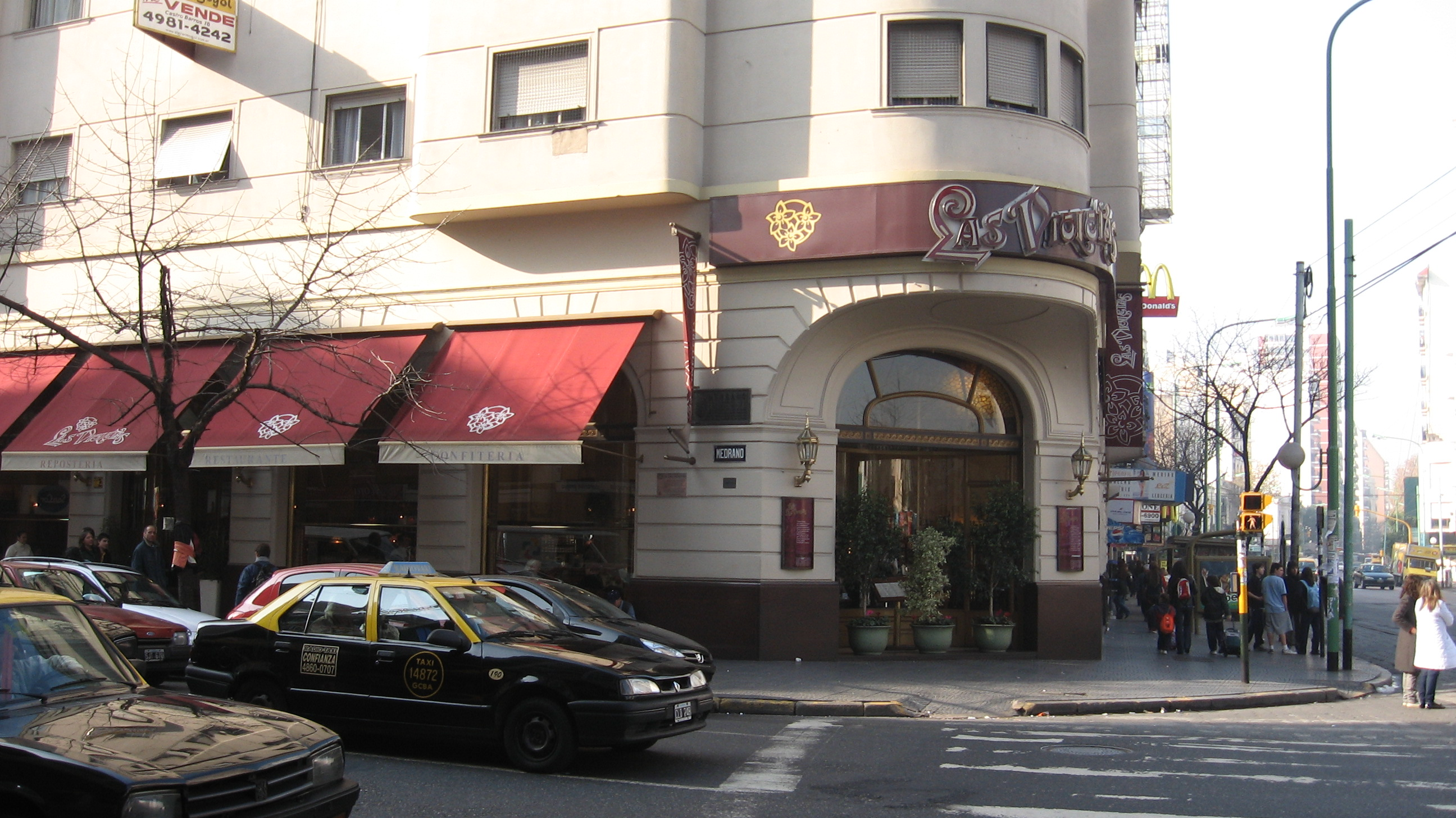
Café Las Violetas.

The Café Las Violetas (Spanish: Confitería Las Violetas) building includes a restaurant and cafe on the corner of Avenida Medrano and Avenida Rivadavia in the Almagro neighborhood of Buenos Aires, Argentina.

== Attraction cafe ==
Café Las Violetas belongs to a select group of bars in Buenos Aires that are officially supported by city government.

== History ==
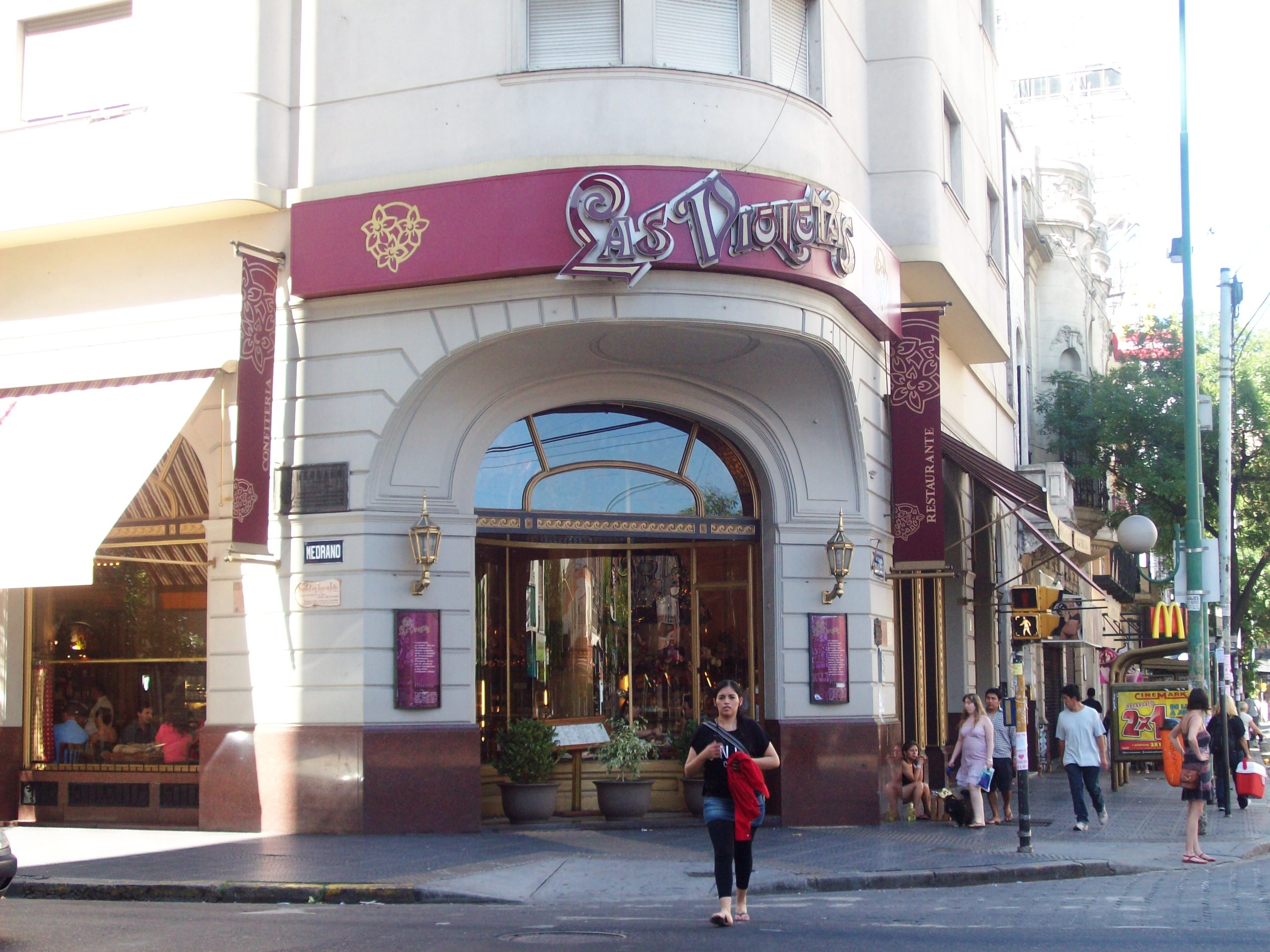
Main entrance.

Café Las Violetas opened on 21 September 1884. It was rebuilt in the 1920s with stained-glass windows, curved glass doors and Italian marble floors. The stained-glass windows followed the sketches in watercolor and ink for designers in 1928. These sketches, which were preserved, were made in accordance with the recommendations of architect Antonio Estruch, who had experience of similar works in the cafe "Tortoni". He was responsible for the installation.

Grandmothers Plaza de Mayo (Civil Association of Human Rights) sometimes uses the cafe for birthday parties for their stolen grandchildren who disappeared in the period of military dictatorship in 1976-1983.

In 1998, the reconstruction of the site of the Legislative Assembly of the City of Buenos Aires was announced. A few years before its restoration in 2001, the cafe closed and was abandoned.

== Recovery ==
The restoration began in January 2001 and ended in June of the same year. It included the replacement of worn parts, columns and ceiling. Some parts were a complete replacement, with a different size, shape but maintaining the original colors. The facade was preserved in its entirety. Restoration was financed from the municipal budget.

== Gallery ==
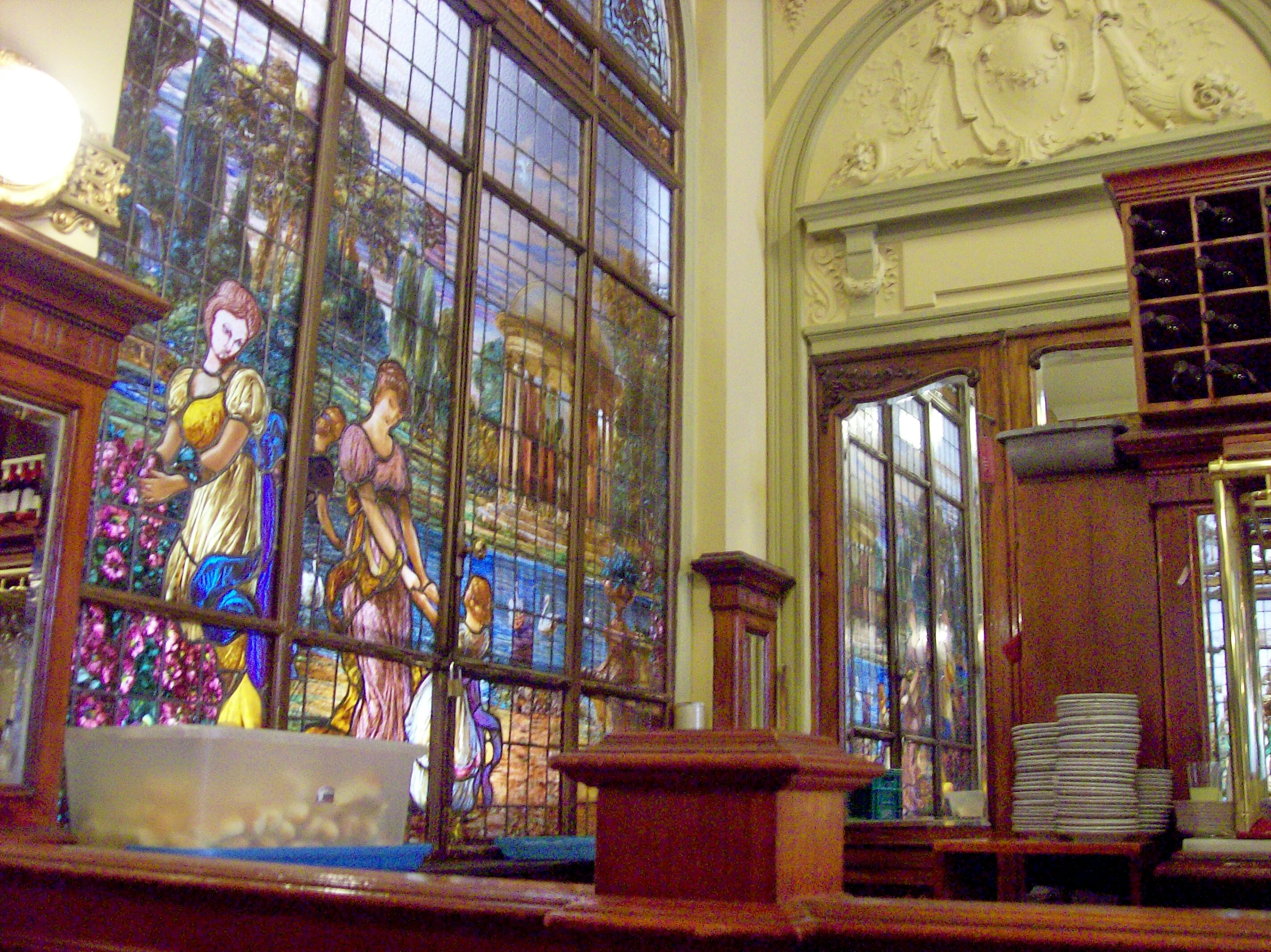

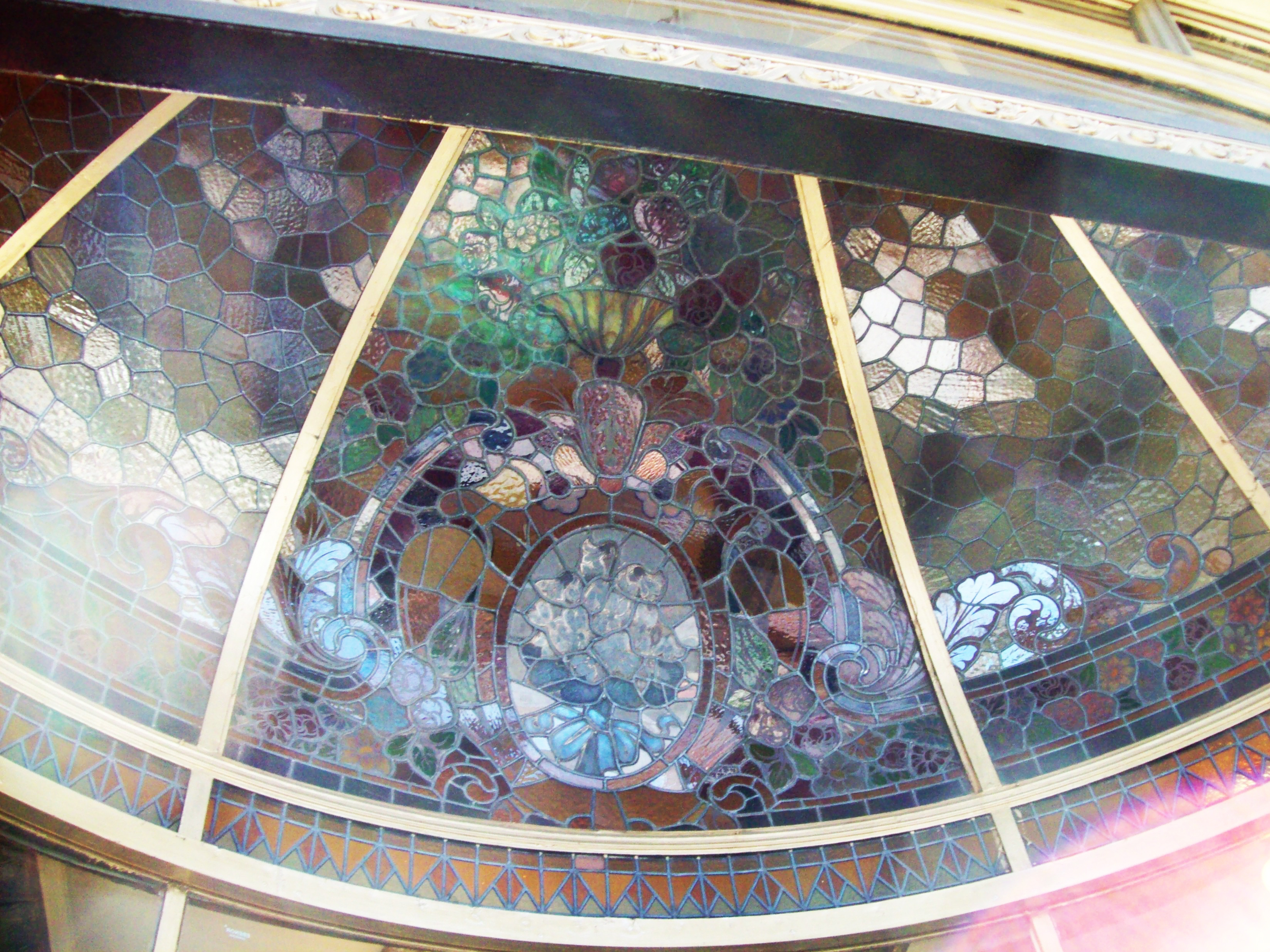

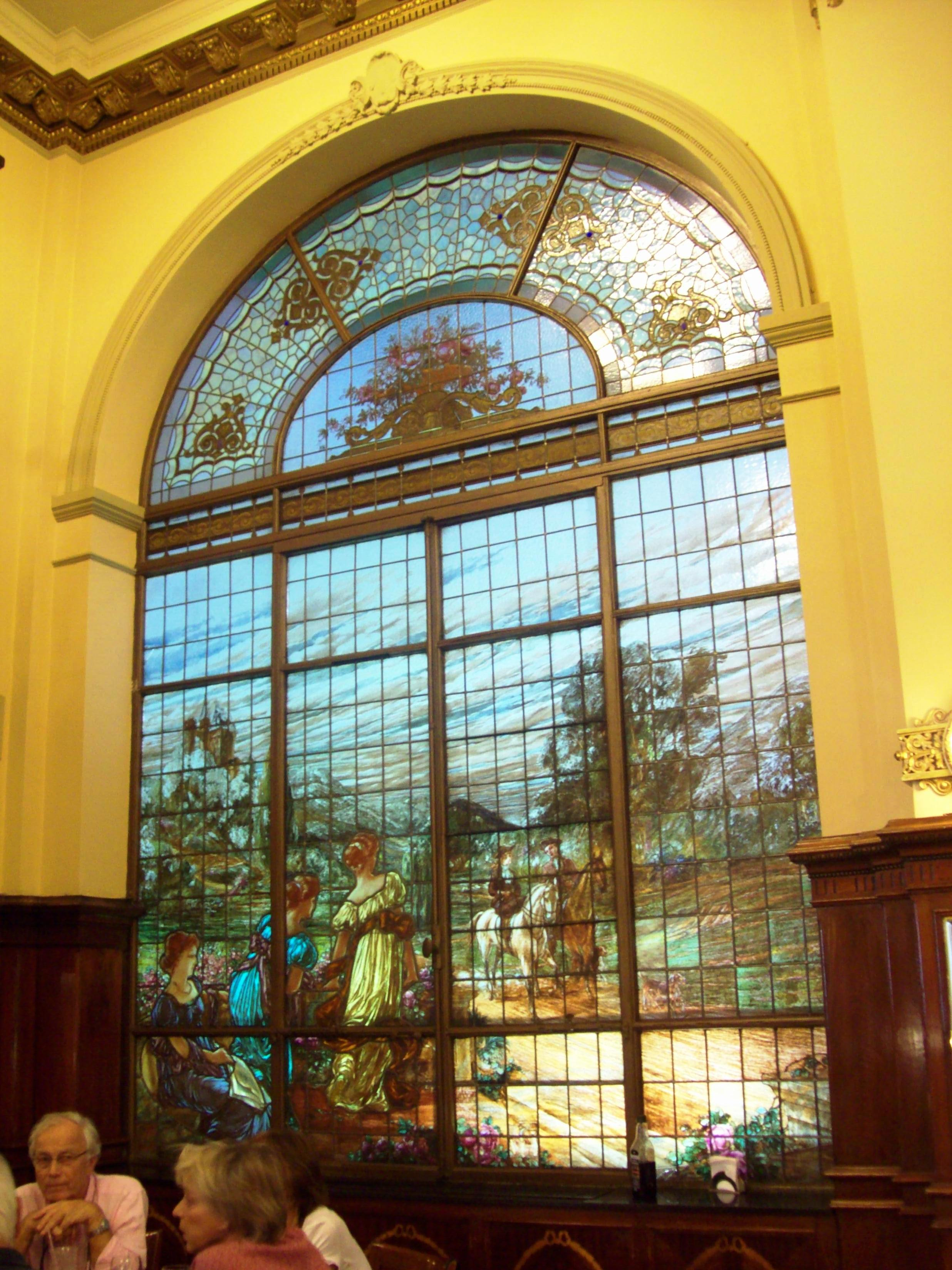

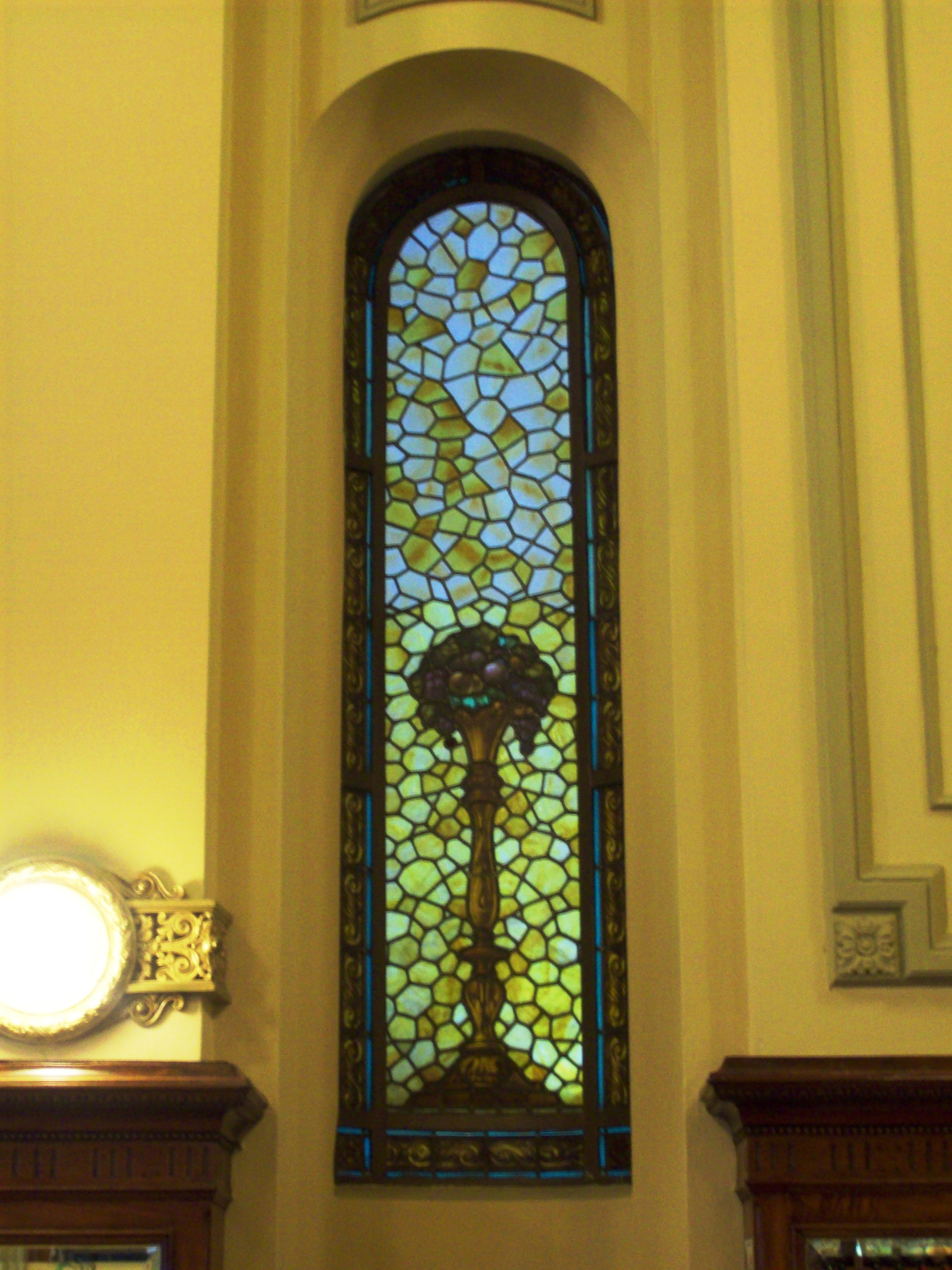

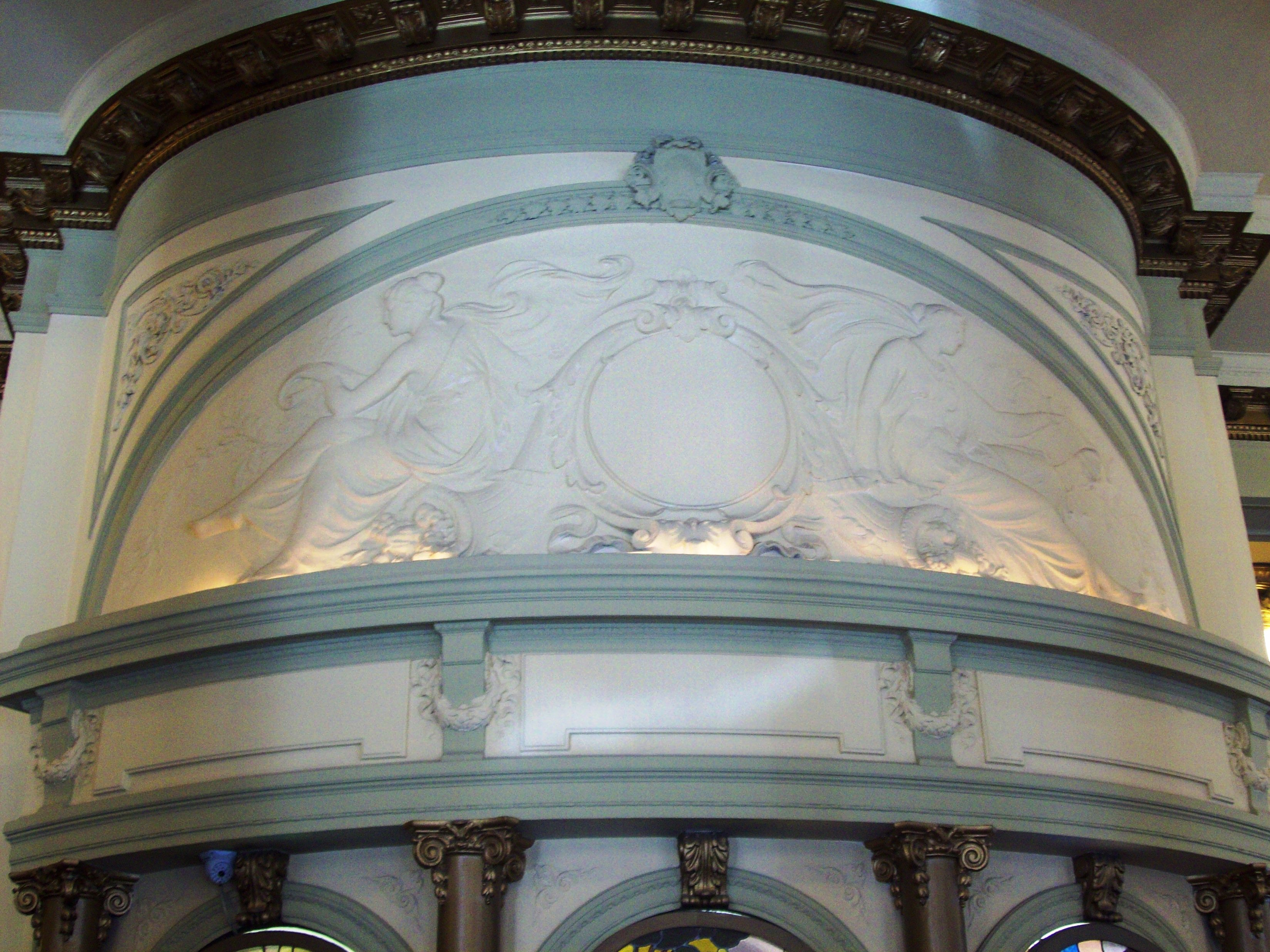

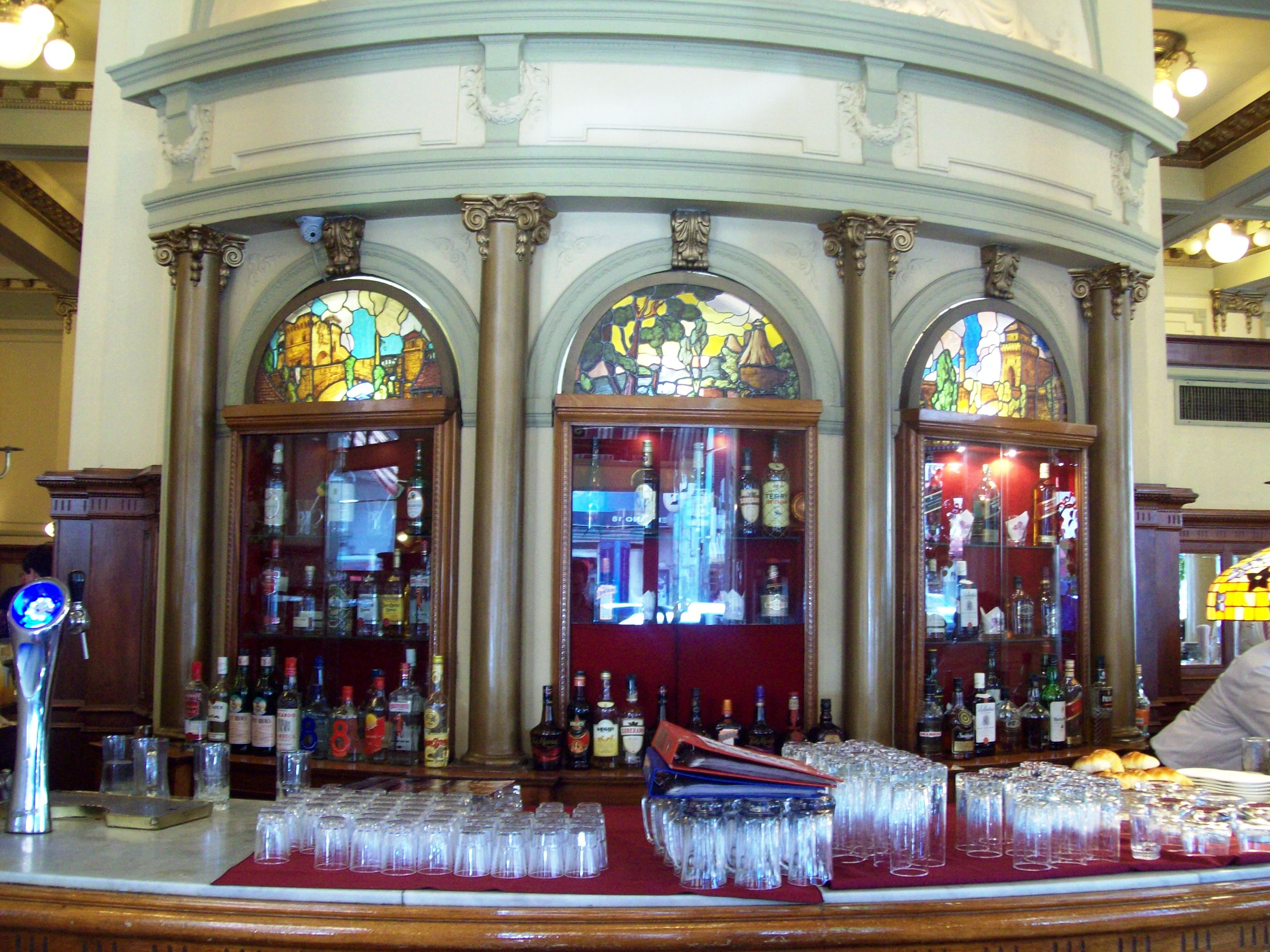

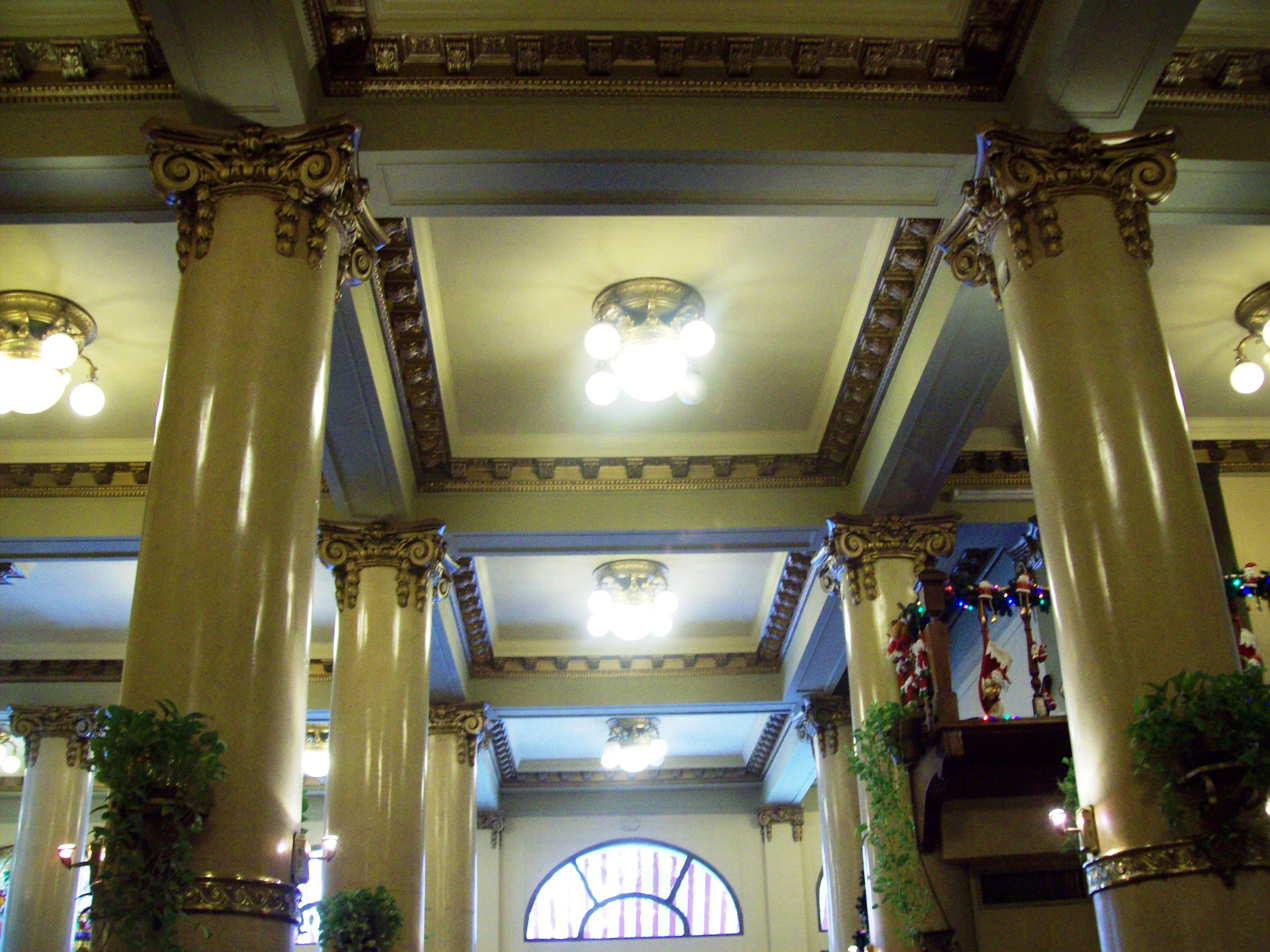

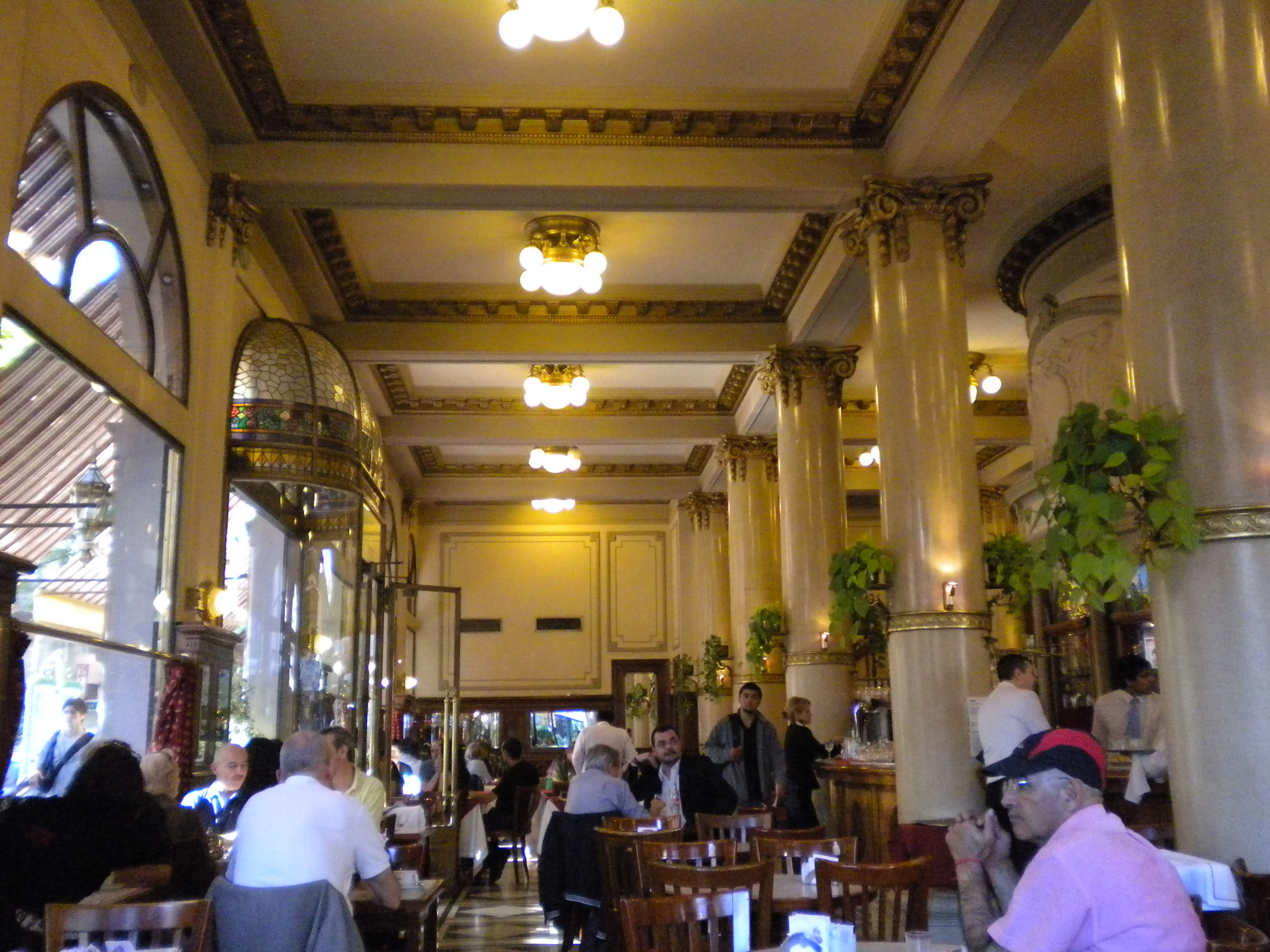

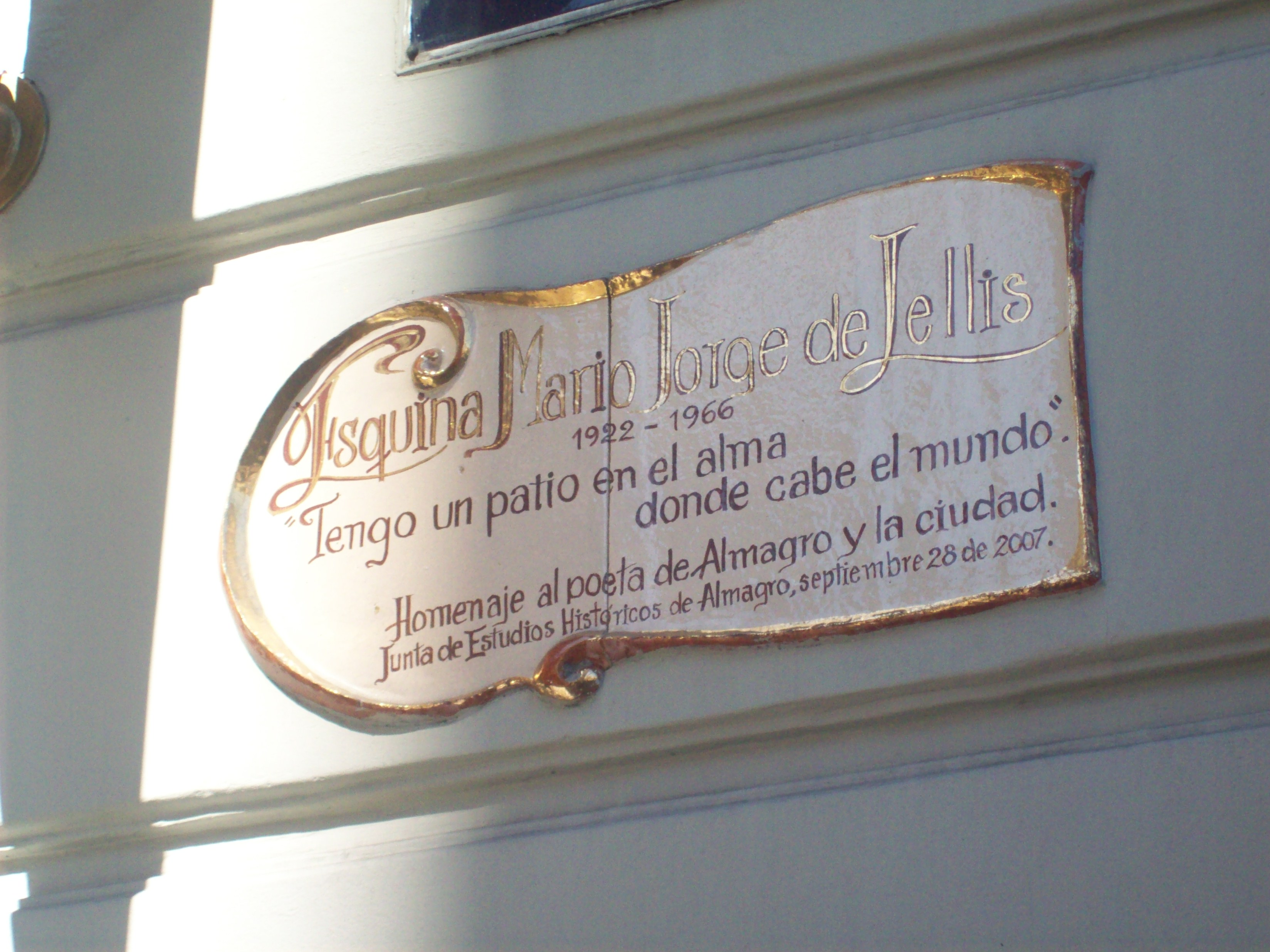
