= Beclean =

- Town
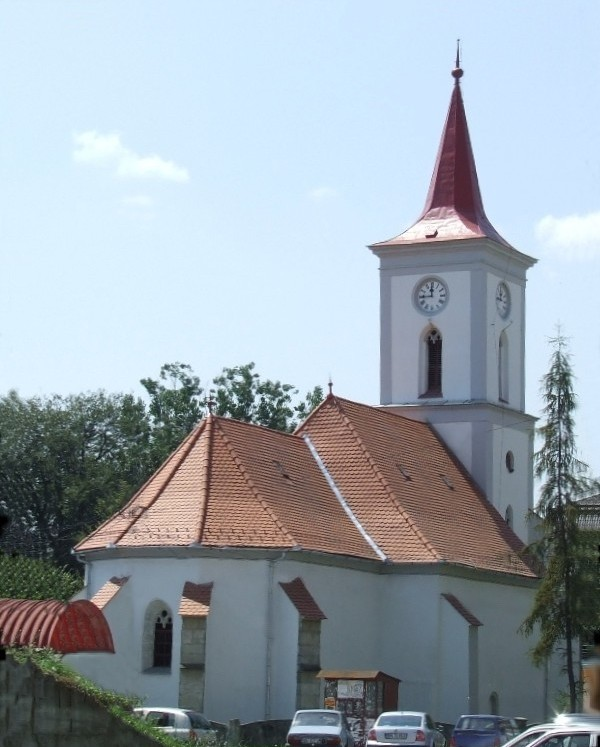
- Reformed church in Beclean

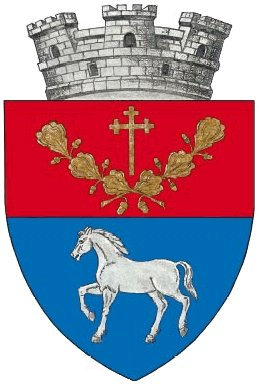
- Coat of arms

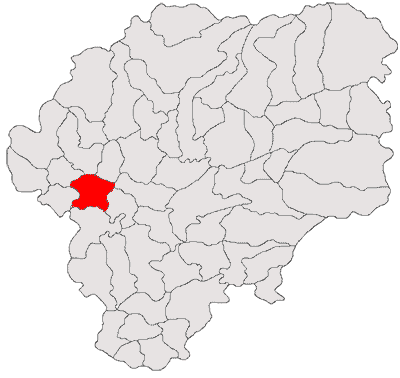
- Location in Bistrița-Năsăud County

- Location in Romania
- Coordinates: 47°10′47″N 24°10′47″E
- Country: Romania
- County: Bistrița-Năsăud

Government
  - Mayor (2024–2028): Nicolae Moldovan (PSD)
- Area: 59.57 km^{2} (23.00 sq mi)
- Elevation: 252 m (827 ft)
- Population (2021-12-01): 11,260
  - Density: 189.0/km^{2} (489.6/sq mi)
- Time zone: UTC+02:00 (EET)
  - Summer (DST): UTC+03:00 (EEST)
- Postal code: 425100
- Area code: +(40) 263
- Vehicle reg.: BN
- Website: primariabeclean.ro

Beclean (Romanian pronunciation: [beˈkle̯an]; Hungarian and German: Bethlen) is a town in Bistrița-Năsăud County, in north-eastern Transylvania, Romania. The town administers three villages: Coldău (formerly Kudu; Várkudu; German: Goldau or Kojau), Figa (Füge), and Rusu de Jos (Alsóoroszfalu).

== Geography ==
The town lies on the Transylvanian Plateau, at the confluence of the river Someșul Mare with its affluent, the Șieu. It is located in the western part of the county, at a distance of 30 km (19 mi) from the town of Năsăud and 36 km (22 mi) from the county seat, Bistrița; the city of Dej is 27 km (17 mi) to the west, in Cluj County.

== History ==
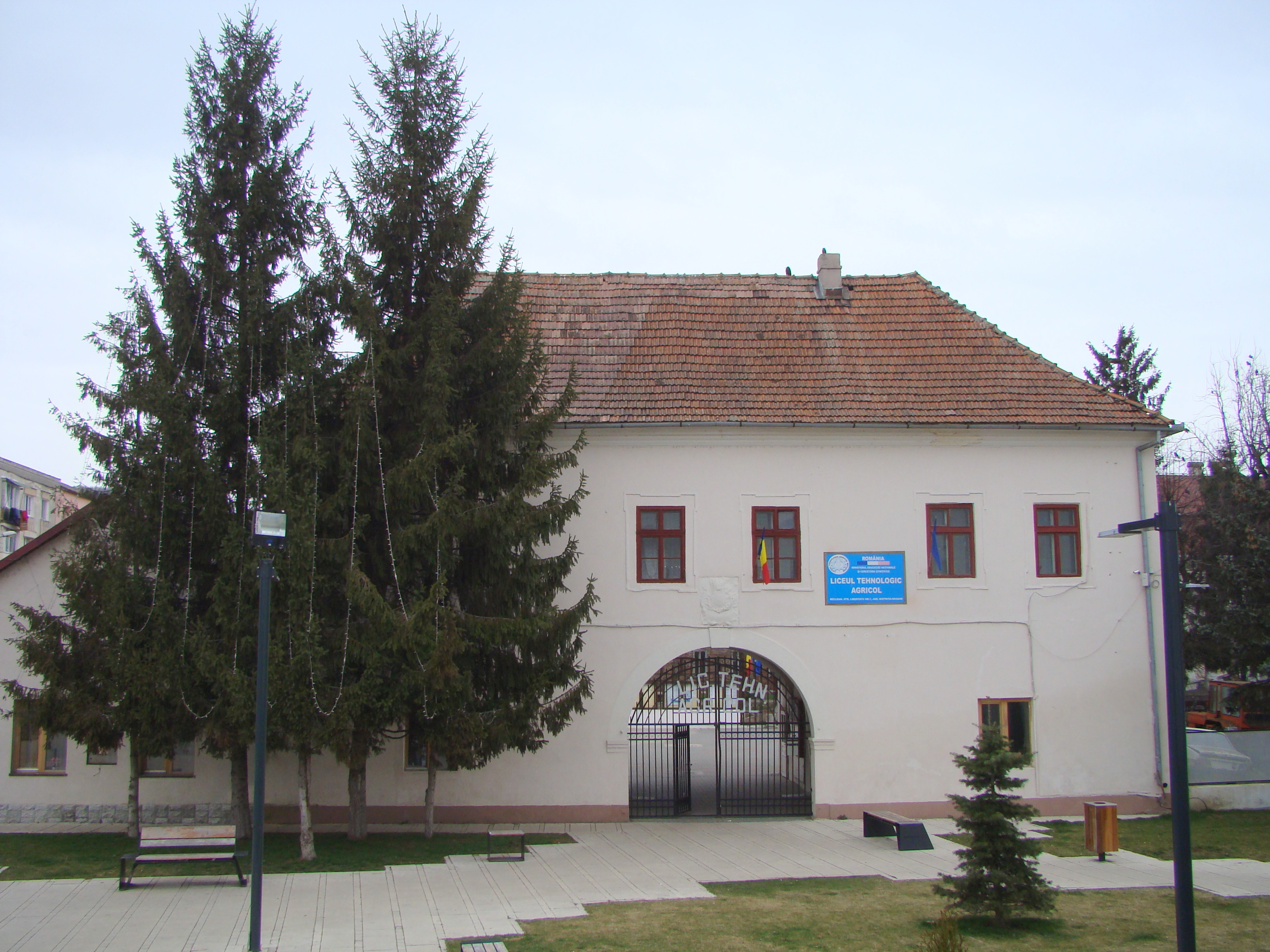
Bethlen Castle

The town of Beclean is the ancestral seat of the Hungarian Bethlen family.

In 1850, the town had 1,475 inhabitants, of which 805 were Romanians, 327 Hungarians, 163 Jews, 163 Roma, 5 Germans, and 12 of other ethnicities. At the 2011 census, it had 10,628 inhabitants; of those, 81.6% were Romanians, 14.2% Hungarians, and 3.7% Roma. At the 2021 census, Beclean had a population of 11,260.

Historical population
Year	Pop.	±%
1850	1,475	—
1910	3,070	+108.1%
1920	3,088	+0.6%
1930	3,334	+8.0%
1941	3,439	+3.1%
1966	3,657	+6.3%
1977	6,957	+90.2%
1992	11,606	+66.8%
2002	12,033	+3.7%
2011	10,628	−11.7%
2021	11,260	+5.9%
Source: Census data

== Transportation ==
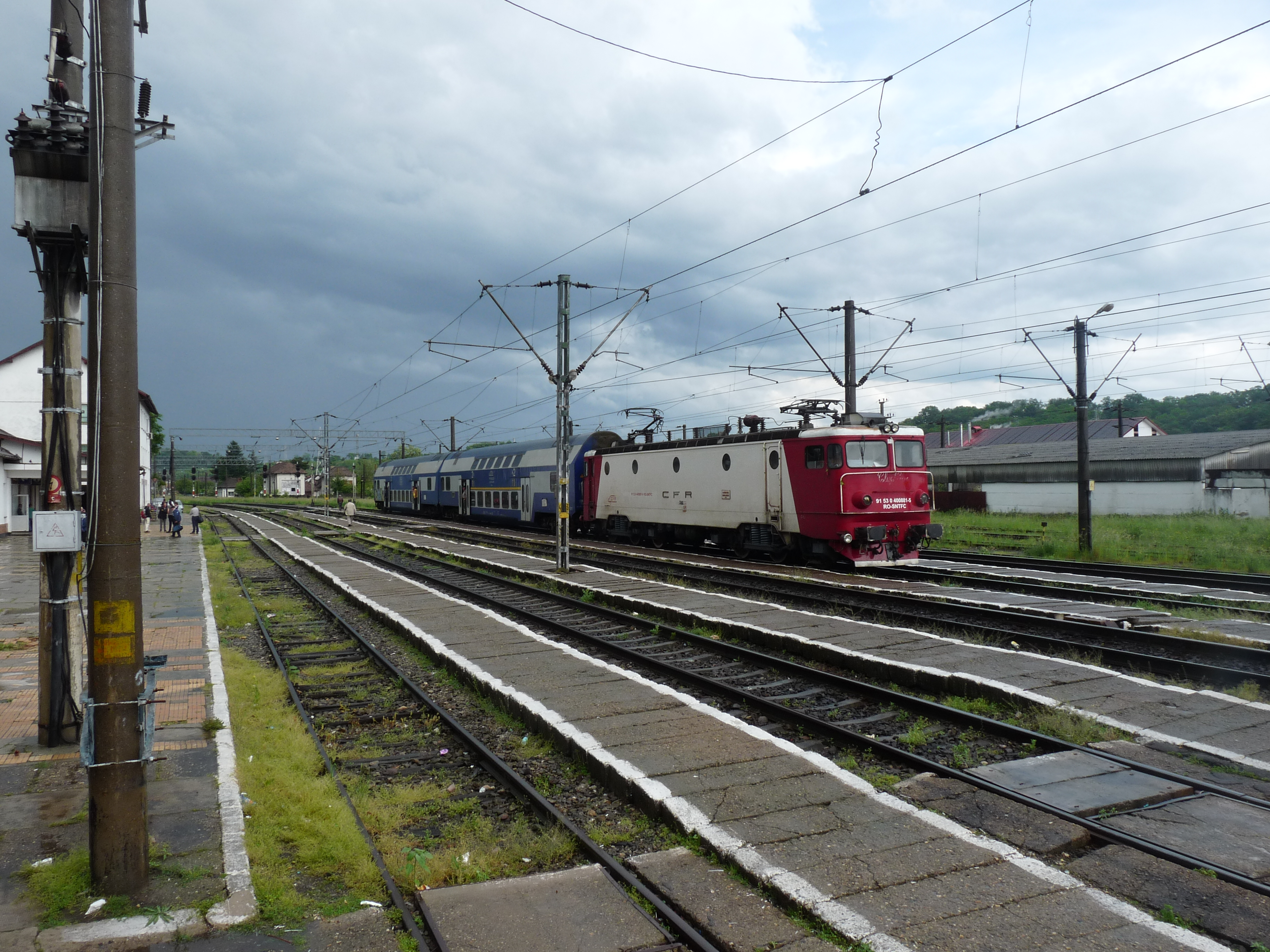
Beclean pe Someș train station

Beclean is the site of an important railway junction (the train station is called Beclean pe Someș), where secondary routes to Sighetu Marmației and Suceava diverge from the main Căile Ferate Române railway line 400 from Brașov to Satu Mare.

The town is traversed by two national roads: DN17 (part of European route E58), which joins Dej in Cluj County to Suceava, and DN17D, which joins Beclean to Cârlibaba in Suceava County. Additionally, county road DJ172A connects it to Gherla in Cluj County, while road DJ172F provides an alternate route to Dej.

== Education ==
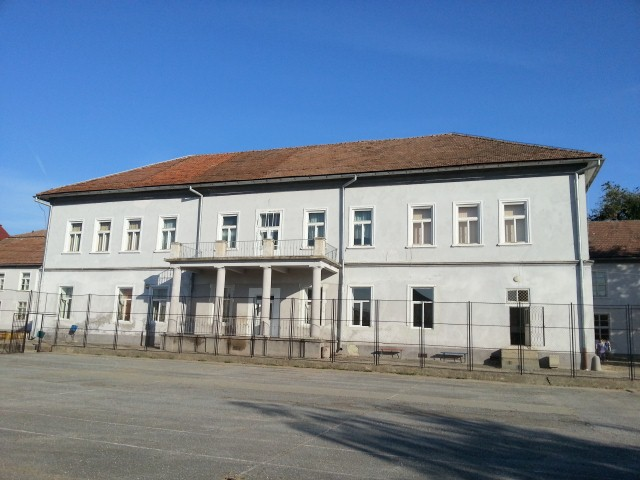
Grigore Silași Gymnasium

Beclean is home to four high schools: the Petru Rareș National College, the Henri Coandă Technological High School, the Beclean Agricultural Technological High School, and High School Nr. 1. There is also a middle school, the Grigore Silași Gymnasium.

== Natives ==
- Radu Afrim (born 1968), theater director
- Károly Bárányos (1892–1956), Hungarian politician
- György Bernády (1864–1938), mayor of Târgu Mureș
- Cornel Cornea (born 1981), footballer
- Cristian Costin (born 1998), footballer
- Grigore Silași (1836–1897), Greek Catholic priest and philologist
- Aharon Ze'evi-Farkash (born 1948), Israeli general
- Blaga Darius Lucian (born 2010), footballer
