= György Bernády =

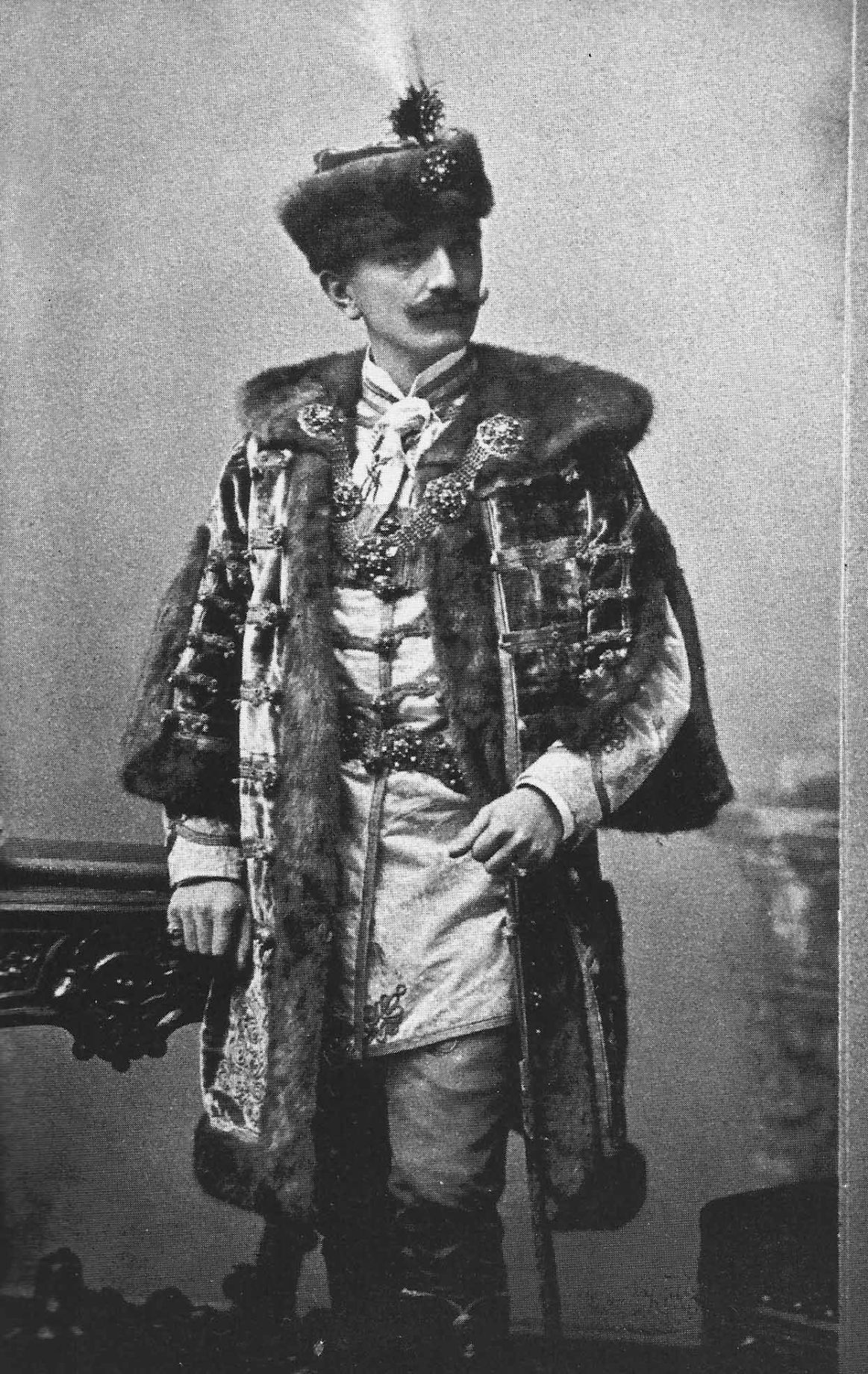

Mayor of Târgu Mureș/Marosvásárhely
- In office 1902–1912
- In office 1926–1929

Member of the Chamber of Deputies of Romania
- In office 1926–1926

Member of the National Assembly of Hungary
- In office 1896–1901

Personal details
- Born: 10 April 1864 Bethlen, Grand Principality of Transylvania, Austrian Empire
- Died: 22 October 1938 (aged 74) Târgu Mureș, Kingdom of Romania
- Party: Liberal Party; Magyar Party of Romania

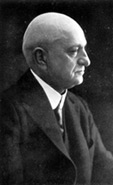
György Bernády portrait

György Bernády (Bethlen, 10 April 1864 – Târgu Mureș, 22 October 1938) was the mayor of Târgu Mureș (Marosvásárhely) twice, 1900–1912 and 1926–1929. Prior to this, in 1896, he was elected as representative of Târgu Mureș in the National Assembly. In this period the City Hall and the Cultural Palace in Târgu Mureș on the Roses Square were both built. His name is associated with public illumination and sewerage in the city. In this period many schools, libraries and art galleries were also built.

== Biography ==
He was born to Hungarian parents. His father, Dániel Bernády was an apothecary.

György Bernády studied in Marosvásárhely and Budapest. He had a daughter, Györgyike, born in 1919 in his fourth marriage, but he lost her very quickly, after 17 years.

Bernády's statue is located in front of the Teleki house, in a place named after him. The statue's creator is Vince Bocskay, from Sovata.

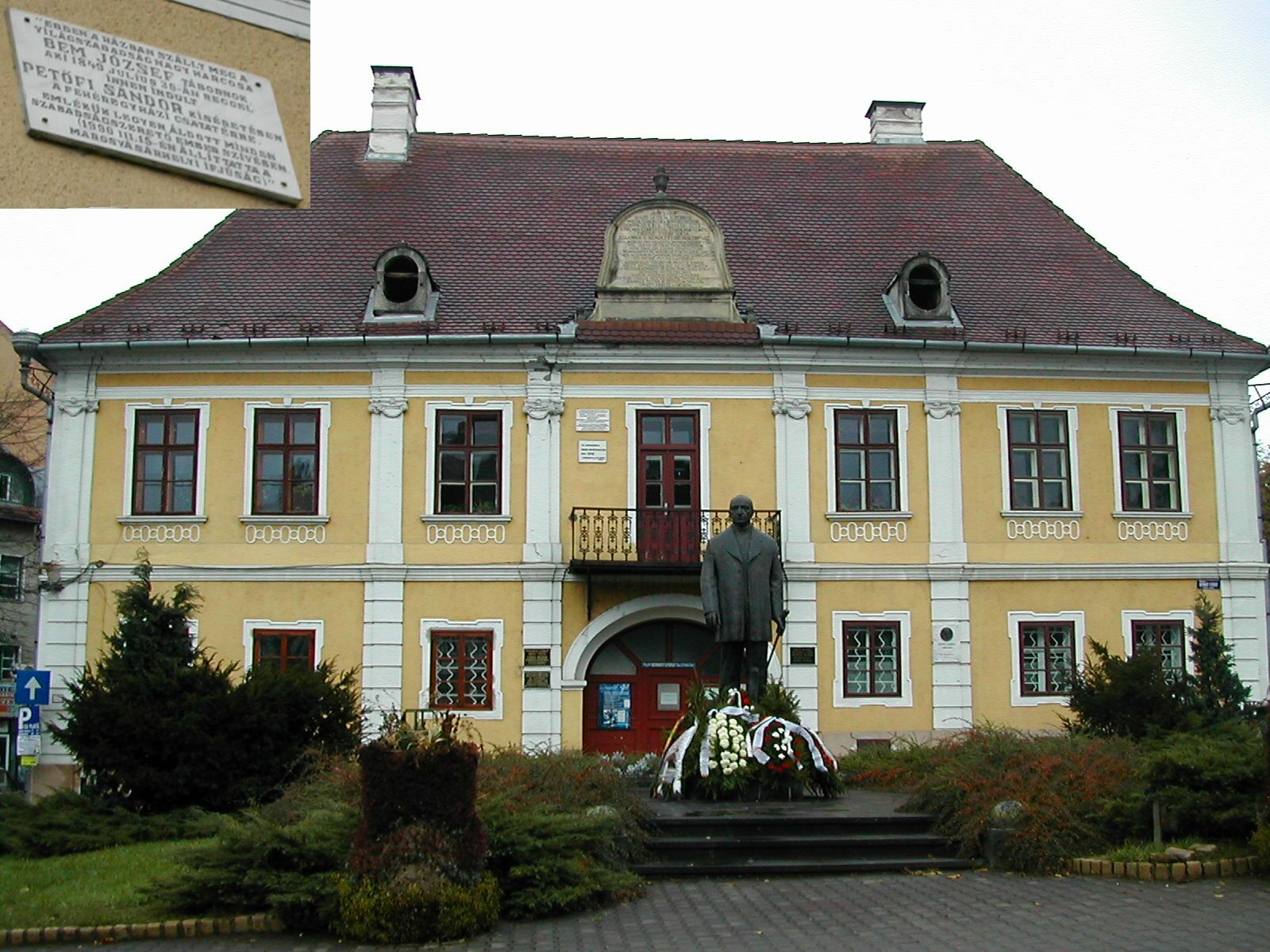
Bernády György statue in front of the Teleki house in Târgu Mureş

== Modernization ==
Bernády was the first initiator of the town modernization. He had many goals such as sewerage, roads asphalting, building of the power and water station, building of several bridges, regularization of the Mureș stream and building of public buildings such as the City Hall, the Cultural Palace in Târgu Mureș. He founded and settled the Academy of Music, the Municipal Library and the Art Galleries.

There were constructed several buildings to host primary, secondary schools and universities.

== Works ==
- "Az erdélyrészi földgáz kérdésről" (Questions about Transylvanian natural gas) (Târgu Mureş, 1913)
- "Intelmek" (Remonstrances) (Târgu Mureş, 1916)
- "Nyílt levél" (Open letter) (Târgu Mureş, 1920)
