= Giuseppe Piccio =

Italian Venetian-language lexicographer

Giuseppe Piccio was a Venetian literary critic and editor of the Italian literary magazine L’Alba. An instructor at the Marco Foscarini Royal Gymnasium, Piccio also compiled the Dizionario veneziano–italiano, published in 1916, significantly at a time when Venetian had been gradually losing favor to Tuscan even among Venetian literary circles. The Dizionario remains one of the few extant dictionaries of Venetian to this day.

== Bibliography ==
- Impressioni sull'Iacopo Ortis (Voghera, 1886)
- L’Alba (Venice, 1896–1901)
- Dizionario veneziano-italiano: Con note grammaticali e fonologiche seguite da testi dialettali (Venice, 1916)
