= Figa, Bistrița-Năsăud =

Figa
- Village
- Location in Romania
- Coordinates: 47°08′23″N 24°12′39″E
- Country: Romania
- County: Bistrița-Năsăud
- Town: Beclean
- Population (2011): 516
- Time zone: EET/EEST (UTC+2/+3)
- Vehicle reg.: BN

Figa (Hungarian: Füge) is a village in the town of Beclean in Bistrița-Năsăud County, Transylvania, Romania. According to the 2011 census, Figa had 516 residents.

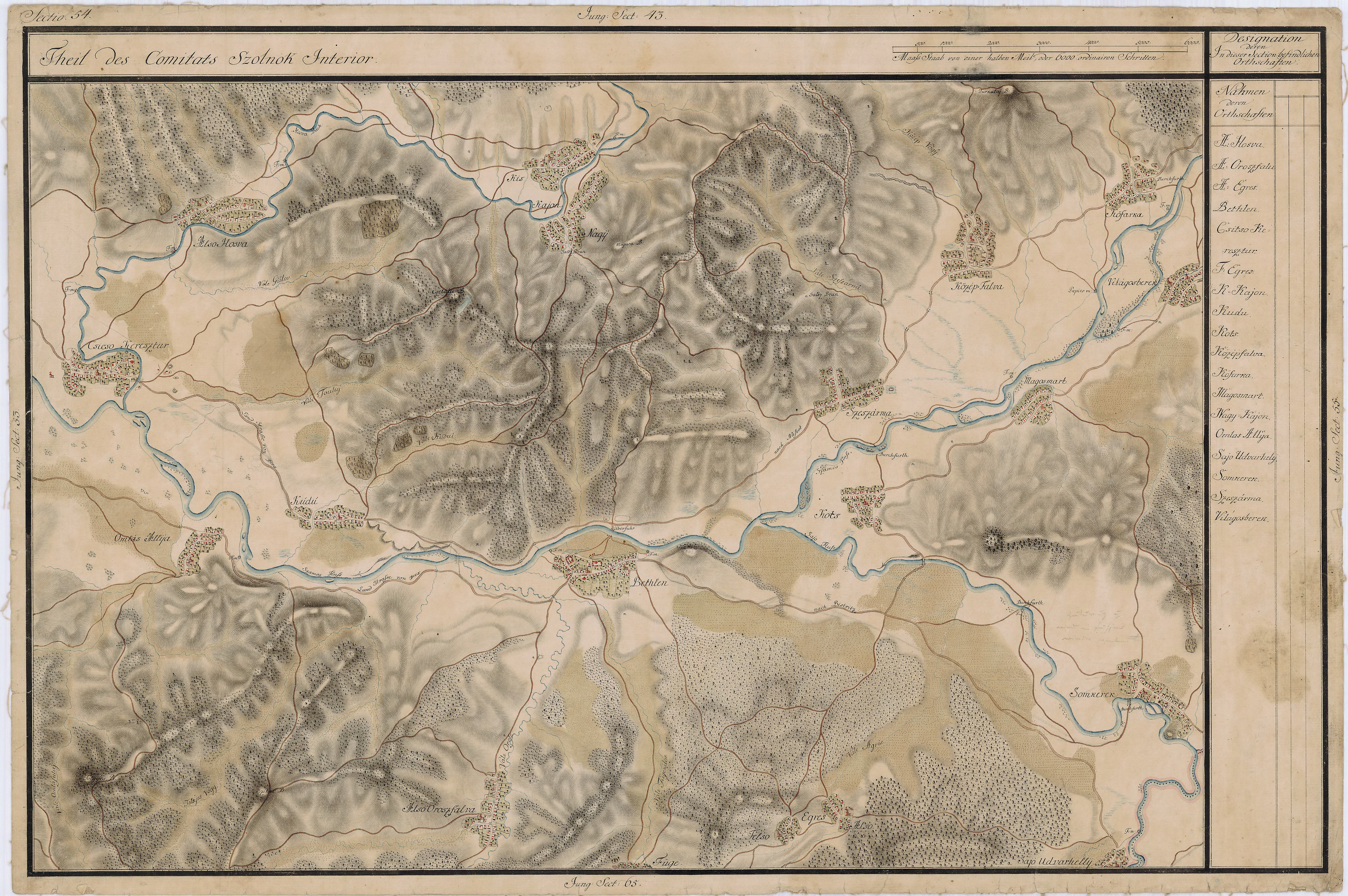
Figa on the Josephine Map of Transylvania, 1769–1773

== Geography ==
Figa is situated in a valley surrounded by the hills of Beclean. It is noted for its salt water and mud with properties similar to that of Techirghiol. It features a spa consisting of an outdoor saltwater pool, an indoor heated swimming pool, sauna, jacuzzi, massage, fitness and sports grounds.

The microrelief of the old salt-mining areas, with numerous excavations or pits, occupied today by salty sludges, springs and ponds and halophytic vegetation, present in the Figa valley, witness the ancient exploitation of salt in excavations with diameters ranging from 4–15 m, respectively with depths of up to 10 m.

== History ==
The archaeological site of Băile Figa is one of the most important monuments of prehistoric salt mining in Europe. The artifacts, whose age was established by the carbon-14 method, date back to around 1000 BC. A trough, of the same age, was presumably used to direct the water stream onto the salt walls for their sectioning. According to other authors, it was used to obtain salt by the briquetting process.

== Demographics ==
According to the 2011 census, the village had 516 residents. Of those, 86.07% were ethnic Romanians, 13.5% Roma and 0.42% Hungarians.
