= Avenida Medrano =

Road in Buenos Aires, Argentina

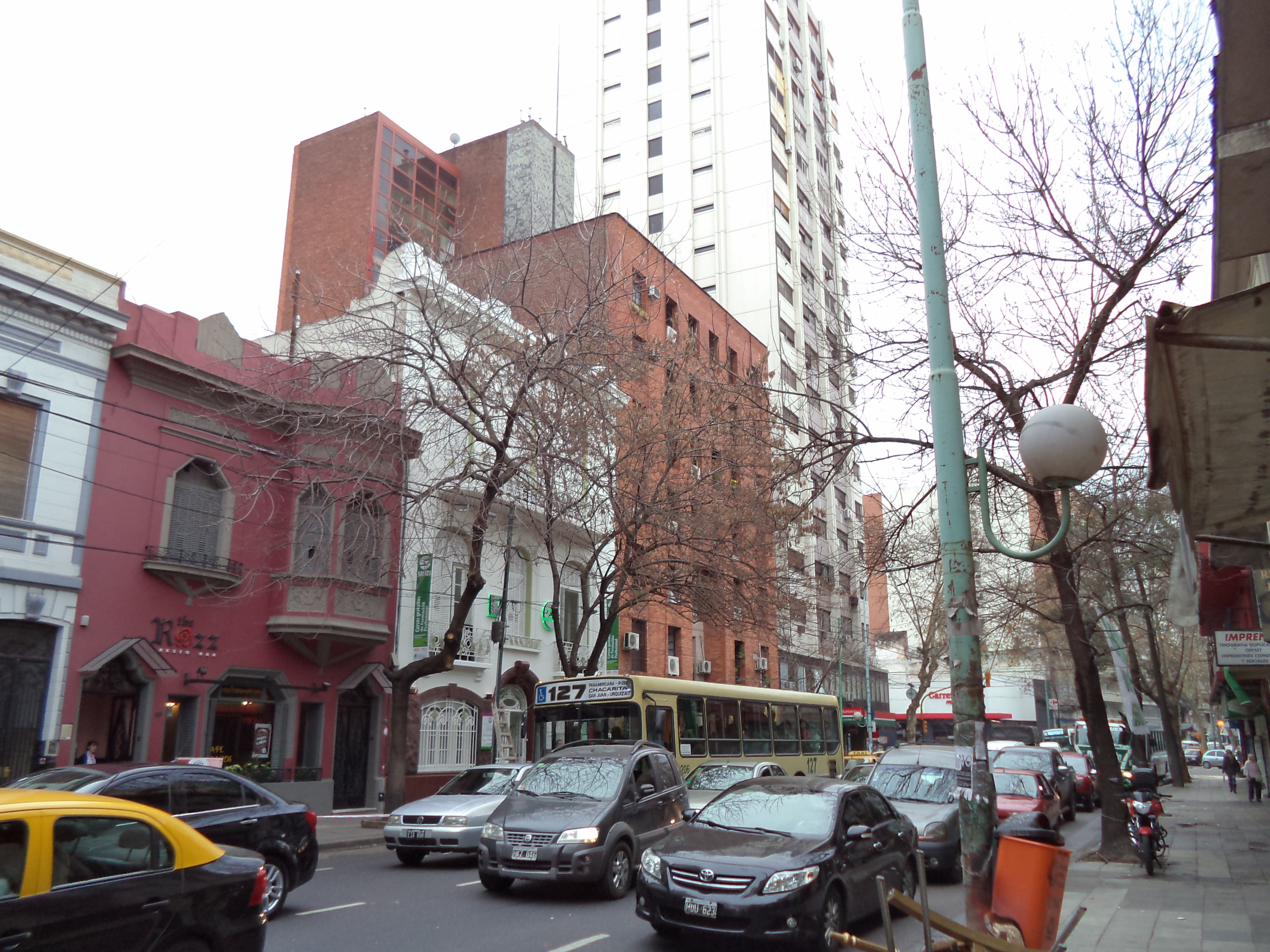
Avenida Medrano

Avenida Medrano is an arterial road in Buenos Aires, Argentina. It was named after the politician Pedro Medrano. It runs through both the Almagro and Palermo neighborhoods. The arterial road runs northbound, with traffic going in the opposite direction. The avenue is characterized by its old banana grove, which was planted at the end of the 19th century. The trees protect the road from the sun during summer and are left completely bare after fall and during winter.

The use of the road is mainly residential, though all along it there are various neighborhood retail commerce zones, along with some other stores from large scale chains.

== Route ==
=== Almagro ===
The avenue starts in the Almagro neighborhood, where Rivadavia Avenue intersects with the Castro Barros Street, the latter being an extension of Medrano towards the south of the city. Since 1884, the Café Las Violetas has stood on Avenida Medrano. It was declared a site of cultural interest by the Buenos Aires City Legislature in 1998, and it was restored by the city's administration in 2001. Also located on Avenida Medrano is the Casto Barros metro station which opened in 1914. About 100 meters from the metro station, Avenida Medrano crosses a bridge, the Sarmiento Railroads, which was built in 1902 in the Caballito neighborhood. The next major intersection of Avenida Medrano is with Diaz Velez Street, an important arterial road that starts in El Cid Campeador and the west side of the city and ends in the surroundings of the Plaza Once Square.

The Avendia Medrano intersection with Avenida Corrientes is one of the major commercial neighborhoods in the Almagro area. At this intersection is the metro station Medrano on Line B, opened in 1930. The Lacroze tram company used to also be located at this intersection, which made the area an important transportation center. However, it disappeared after the closure of the tram line in the area in 1962. A few meters away is the Universal Church of the Kingdom of God, located at the site of the town's old flower market that existed until 2004.

The National Technological University, Buenos Aires Regional Faculty can be found four blocks down at 951 Medrano Avenue. On the north side of Humahuaca Street stands the church Iglesia Betania.

=== Palermo ===
Crossing Avenida Córdoba, Avenida Medrano enters the Palermo neighborhood. Between the streets El Salvador and Costa Rica is the Plaza Unidad Latinoamericana, where the primary school, Escuela Primaria Común No. 09 "Cnel. Genaro Beron de Astrada" is located. Medrano Avenue runs through another eight blocks, ending at Charcas Street and bordering the well-known Plaza Güemes, next to the parish of Our Lady of Guadalupe (la Parroquia Nuestra Señora de Guadalupe) and the school, Colegio Guadalupe.

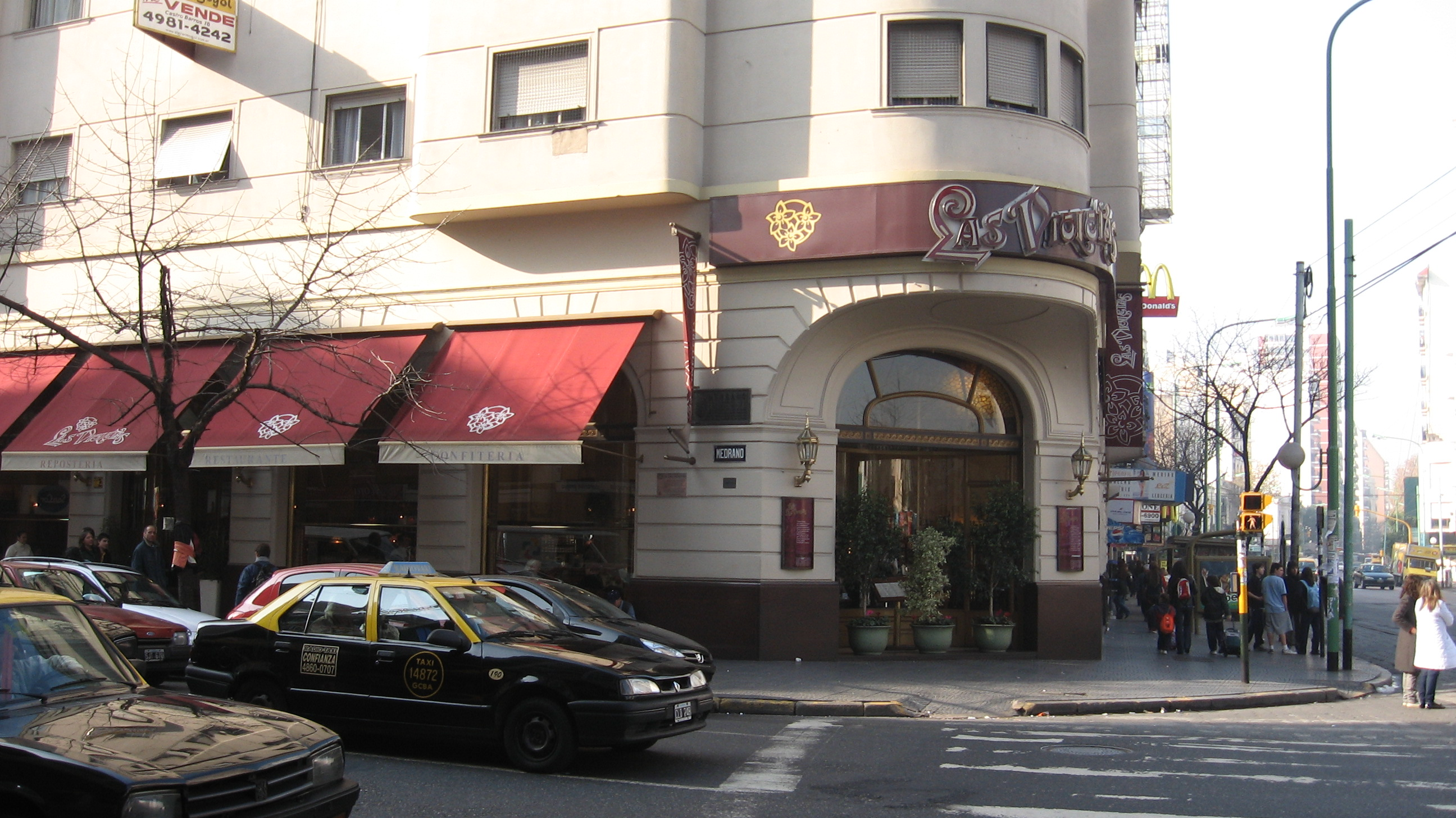
Café Las Violetas. On the corner of Medrano and Rivadavia

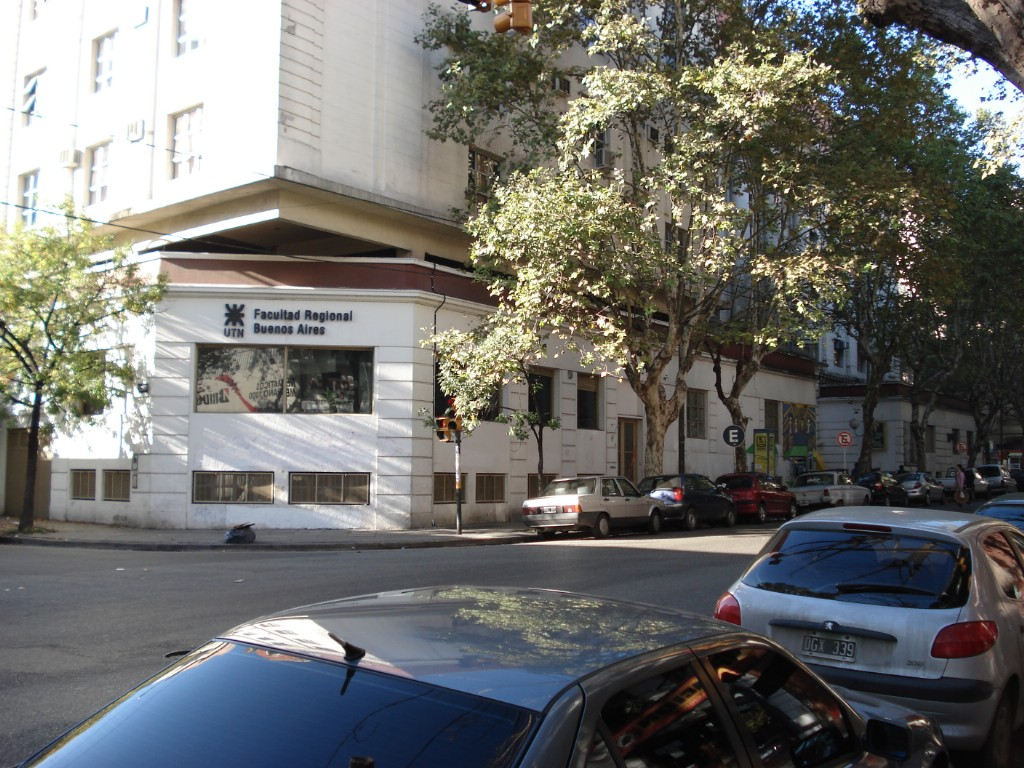
Regional Buenos Aires Faculty of the National University of Technology.
